= Wortley =

Wortley could refer to:

== Places ==
- Wortley, Gloucestershire, a location in England
- Wortley, Leeds, a district of Leeds, West Yorkshire, England
- Wortley, South Yorkshire, a village south of Barnsley, South Yorkshire, England
  - Wortley railway station
  - Wortley Hall, a stately home in Wortley, South Yorkshire
  - Wortley Rural District

== People ==
- Alexander Wortley (1899–1980), English naval veteran eccentric
- Dana Wortley (born 1959), Australian politician
- Sir Edward Wortley Montagu (1678–1761), British Ambassador to the Ottoman Empire
- Edward Wortley Montagu (1713–1776), English author
- Elise Wortley (born 1990), British explorer
- George C. Wortley (b. 1926), American politician
- James Stuart-Wortley (disambiguation), several people
- John Wortley (1934–2019), British-Canadian professor and Byzantinist
- Lady Mary Wortley Montagu (1689–1762), English aristocrat and writer
- Rothesay Stuart Wortley (1892–1926), British aviator
- Russell Wortley (born 1957), Australian politician
- Stuart-Wortley, several people
