= Stuart-Wortley =

Stuart-Wortley is a surname. Notable people with the name are:

- James Stuart-Wortley-Mackenzie (1747–1818), British politician and soldier
- John Stuart-Wortley (1773–1797), British politician
- John Stuart-Wortley-Mackenzie, 2nd Baron Wharncliffe (1801–1855), British politician
- Archibald Stuart-Wortley (disambiguation), multiple individuals
- Lady Emmeline Stuart-Wortley-Mackenzie (1806–1855), British writer
- Edward Montagu-Stuart-Wortley-Mackenzie, 1st Earl of Wharncliffe (1827–1899), British railway executive
- Victoria Alexandrina Stuart-Wortley-Mackenzie (1837–1912), British philosopher
- Charles Stuart-Wortley, 1st Baron Stuart of Wortley (1851–1926), English statesman
- Edward James Montagu-Stuart-Wortley (1857–1934), British general
- James Stuart-Wortley (disambiguation), multiple individuals
- Charles Stuart-Wortley-Mackenzie (1802–1844), British politician
