= Rothesay Stuart Wortley =

British soldier and pilot (1892–1926)

Rothesay Nicholas Montagu Stuart Wortley
- Born: 9 January 1892; Highcliffe Castle, Hampshire, England
- Died: 29 December 1926 (aged 34); Southern France
- Relatives: Edward James Montagu-Stuart-Wortley (father)
- Military career
- Allegiance: United Kingdom
- Branch: British Army; Royal Air Force
- Service years: 1912–1919
- Rank: Major
- Units: Hampshire Yeomanry; No. 22 Squadron RFC
- Commands: No. 44 Training Depot Station; No. 88 Squadron RAF
- Conflicts: First World War • Western Front
- Awards: Military Cross
- Other work: Journalist & author

Rothesay Nicholas Montagu Stuart Wortley, (Note: Both Fox-Davies and Burkes give his birth name as Nicholas Rothesay Montagu-Stuart-Wortley. However, during his military service the London Gazette lists him as R[othesay] N[icholas] Montagu-Stuart-Wortley, which suggests that he may have changed it on enlisting. His books were published under the name Rothesay Stuart Wortley.) MC (9 January 1892 – 29 December 1926) was a British World War I soldier, Royal Flying Corps fighter pilot and a journalist and author.

== Early life ==
Nicholas Rothesay Montagu Stuart-Wortley was born at Highcliffe Castle, Hampshire (now in Dorset, on 9 January 1892, the first child and only son of Major-General the Honourable Edward James Montagu-Stuart-Wortley, and his wife Violet (née Guthrie). He was educated at Eton College and Oxford University, where he read History. On 25 March 1912 he received a commission as a Subaltern in the British Army's Hampshire Yeomanry, of the (Territorial Force).

== First World War ==
On 5 August 1914, the day after the United Kingdom declared war on Germany, Stuart-Wortley was appointed an aide-de-camp to serve on the personal staff of his father, General Officer Commanding of the 46th (North Midland) Division.

On 12 February 1917 Stuart-Wortley was transferred from the British Army to Royal Flying Corps, and after completing flight training was commissioned as a Flying Officer on 12 June 1917. On 30 June 1917 he was promoted to the rank of captain, with seniority from 1 June 1916. He was posted as a pilot to join No.22 Squadron R.F.C., a fighter unit flying Bristol F.2's two-seaters. He gained his first aerial victories on 6 September 1917 by driving down two German aircraft. He destroyed two enemy fighters on 22 September 1917, and captured another on 17 October 1917. His sixth and final victory came on 28 January 1918, when he sent a German fighter down in flames.

He was awarded the Military Cross, which was gazetted on 19 April 1918, the citation reading:

Captain Rothesay Nicholas Montagu-Stuart-Wortley, Yeomanry and Royal Flying Corps.

"For conspicuous gallantry and devotion to duty. On each of three occasions, when on offensive patrol, he has attacked and brought down in flames one enemy aeroplane, in addition to which he has sent down out of control three other hostile machines. He has displayed great courage and determination as a patrol leader."

He was appointed as Squadron Commander with the temporary rank of major on 1 July 1918, with No.44 Training Depot Station at RAF Bicester until September 1918. He then returned to France where he commanded No.88 Squadron, Royal Air Force until the end of the war in November 1918.

On 1 May 1919 he was appointed as a Staff Officer 3rd Class at the Air Ministry, and was transferred to the unemployed list on 2 July 1919.

=== List of aerial victories ===
Combat record
No.	Date/Time	Aircraft/ Serial No.	Opponent	Result	Location	Notes
1	6 September 1917 @ abt 0745	Bristol Fighter	C	Out of control	Zonnebeke	Observer: Second Lieutenant P. V. Burton
2	6 September 1917 @ abt 0745	Bristol Fighter	Albatros D.V	Out of control	South-east of Zonnebeke	Observer: Second Lieutenant P. V. Burton
3	22 September 1917 @ 0900	Bristol Fighter (A7118)	Albatros D.V	Destroyed	Houthoulst Forest	
4	22 September 1917 @ 0900	Bristol Fighter (A7118)	Albatros D.V	Destroyed	Houthoulst Forest	
5	17 October 1917 @ 1110	Bristol Fighter (A7268)	Albatros D.III	Captured	Ypres	Observer: Lieutenant H. D. McGrath
6	28 January 1918 @ 1110	Bristol Fighter (C4835)	Albatros D.V	Destroyed in flames	Douvrin	Observer: Lieutenant D. W. Kent-Jones

== Post-war career ==
In 1919 Stuart Wortley married the Canadian opera singer Marie-Louise Martin, (known professionally as Louise Edvina) and worked as an aviation journalist until his death in the south of France from diabetes on 29 December 1926 at the age of 34.

== Publications ==
Along with Canada's top World War I ace, Colonel Billy Bishop, Stuart-Wortley co-authored an adventure novel entitled The Flying Squad, which was published in 1927. His own novel Letters from a Flying Officer, a fictionalised account of his own experiences, was published in 1928. A book of short stories Tales of the Air, was published in 1932.
