= Attack on the Gommecourt Salient =

Battle during the First World War

- Part of the Battle of the Somme
- Battle of the Somme 1 July – 18 November 1916.
Date	1 July 1916
Location	Gommecourt, France 50°08′27″N 02°38′46″E
Result	German victory

Belligerents
British Empire	Germany

Commanders and leaders
Sir Douglas Haig	Erich von Falkenhayn

Strength
2 divisions	5 regiments

Casualties and losses
6,769	1,241
- Gommecourt, a commune of the Pas-de-Calais department of France

The Attack on the Gommecourt Salient was a British operation against the northern flank of the German 2nd Army during the First World War. The attack took place on 1 July 1916, on the Western Front in France, during the Battle of the Somme. The operation was conducted by the British Third Army (Lieutenant-General Edmund Allenby) as a diversion, to protect the northern flank of the main attack. The British Fourth Army on the First day on the Somme, attacked from Serre southwards to the boundary with the French Sixth Army at Maricourt. To extend the attack front of the Fourth Army, the VII Corps (Lieutenant-General Thomas Snow) of the Third Army was to capture the Gommecourt Salient, the most westerly point of the Western Front. In the first week of May, the 56th (1/1st London) Division (Major-General Charles Hull) and the 46th (North Midland) Division (Major-General Edward Montagu-Stuart-Wortley) moved into the area for the attack. By 10 May, both divisions had taken over the front on the right flank of the 37th Division (Major-General Count Gleichen) and begun training for the operation, making no attempt to conceal the preparations.

At 7:30 a.m. on 1 July, the attack on Gommecourt began; the 56th (1st London) Division, to the south, overran the first two German trenches. Troops also reached the third trench but a strongpoint at Nameless Farm held out despite several attacks. The German artillery fired a standing barrage along no man's land and trapped the British on the far side all day, as German infantry gradually recaptured the lost trenches; attempts to send reinforcements from the British lines were costly failures. The 46th (North Midland) Division attack on the north side of the salient had even less success, a smoke screen led the attackers to lose direction as their advance was slowed by deep mud. Some parties of the 137th Brigade got into the German front line and parties of the 139th Brigade reached the second line but German small arms and barrage-fire on no man's land by artillery trapped the attackers and isolated them from their supports. The parties who got across no man's land were surrounded and destroyed, a few men being taken prisoner. The 46th (North Midland) Division had the fewest casualties of the 13 British divisions which attacked on 1 July, which got Montagu-Stuart-Wortley sacked (Stellenbosched) on 5 July. After several local truces, the British wounded were got in during 1 and 2 July, the area becoming a backwater.

The Germans retreated from the Bapaume Salient, created by the Battle of the Somme, in February 1917 and abandoned Gommecourt, which was occupied unopposed on 27 February. In 1918, during the Kaiserschlacht (Spring Offensive 1 March – 18 July), the British dug an improvised defensive position, the Purple Line, south, east and north of the village but the 62nd (2nd West Riding) Division (Major-General Walter Braithwaite) at Bucquoy to the east stopped the German advance. On 28 March, the 41st Division (Major-General Sydney Lawford) occupied the purple line and a battalion of the 124th Brigade attacked Rossignol Wood. As night fell, the 4th Australian Brigade of the 4th Australian Division to the south of Bucquoy and the 2/8th Battalion, West Yorkshire Regiment, 185th Brigade, [62nd (West Riding) Division], attacked the German positions to the south-east. The attack failed but a gap between the Australians and the 186th Brigade was closed and the German threat to Gommecourt removed.

== Background ==
=== Gommecourt ===
Gommecourt is a village to the south-east of Foncquevillers (Funky Villas to the British) and north-east of Hébuterne on the D 6 road to Puisieux. The village is 9.3 mi (15 km) from Albert. From late 1914 to early 1917, the Western Front turned north-east towards Arras and thence northwards to La Bassée and the bend in the line became known as the Gommecourt Salient. The village is atop four low, flat-topped ridges in the shape of a flattened X, the ends pointing towards Essarts, Rossignol Wood, the west side of Hébuterne and the eastern fringe of Foncquevillers. On the north-west side of the salient, the German front line was below the crest of the west side of Essarts Ridge facing a shallow valley, with the British front line on the other side, which was overlooked for about 2,000 yd (1,800 m) over the level ground to the rear of the British line, except where the ruins and trees of Fonquevillers blocked the view.

=== 1914–1915 ===
On 4 October 1914, German attacks by the Höhere Kavallerie-Kommando 2 (II Cavalry Corps), General der Kavallerie Georg von der Marwitz) and the XIV Reserve Corps drove the group of divisions comprising the 81st, 82nd, 84th and 88th Territorial divisions (General Joseph Brugère) back from Hébuterne, Gommecourt and Monchy au Bois to the north. Gommecourt was captured by the 1st Guard Division (Generalleutnant Oskar von Hutier) on the night of 5/6 October and held against French counter-attacks, which were stopped 50 yd (46 m) short of the village, where the front settled until March 1917. The French XI Corps attacked at Beaumont Hamel on 19 November but failed to capture the village after being held up by uncut wire. A diversion, the Battle of Hébuterne, was conducted by XI Corps from 7 to 13 June 1915 at Ferme Toutvent (Windy Farm), 2 mi (3.2 km) to the south, during the Second Battle of Artois. On a 2,000 yd (1,800 m) stretch of the German front line, an area 1,000 yd (910 m) deep was captured and held against German counter-attacks, at a cost of 10,351 casualties. The area around Gommecourt was taken over by the British in July 1915.

=== Strategic developments ===
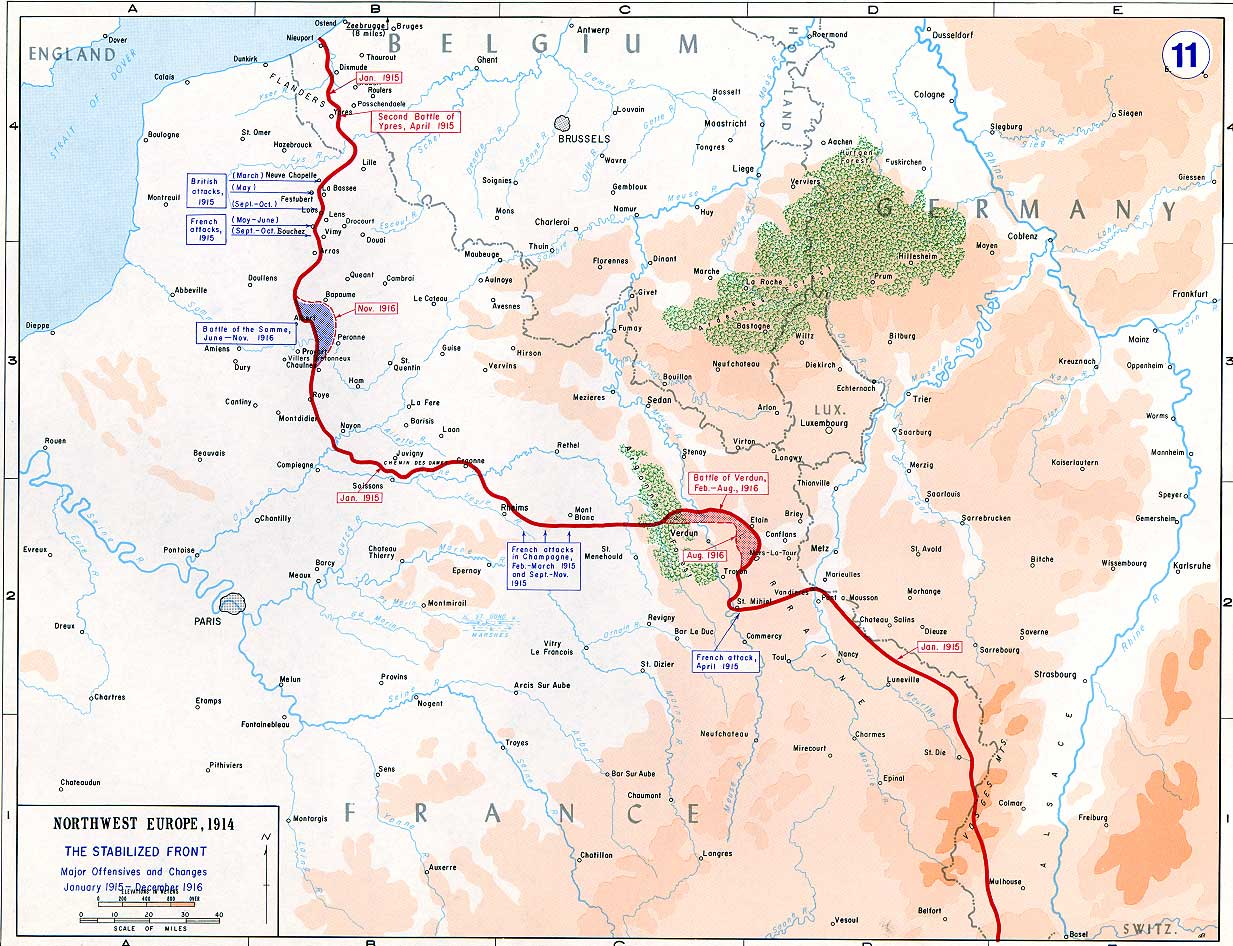
The Western Front 1915–1916

Allied strategy for 1916 was decided at the Chantilly Conference from 6 to 8 December 1915. Simultaneous offensives on the Eastern Front by the Russian army, on the Italian Front by the Italian army and on the Western Front by the Franco-British armies, would deny time for the Central Powers to move troops between fronts. In December 1915, General Sir Douglas Haig replaced General Sir John French as Commander-in-Chief of the BEF. Haig favoured a British offensive in Flanders close to BEF supply routes, to drive the Germans from the Belgian coast and end the U-boat and destroyer threat to cross-Channel traffic from Belgian waters. Haig was not formally subordinate to General Joseph Joffre but the British played a lesser role on the Western Front and perforce complied with French strategy.

In January 1916, Joffre wanted the BEF to deplete German reserves by a large attack north of the Somme, on a 20,000 yd (11 mi; 18 km) front around 20 April and then attack elsewhere in May. Haig objected, since partial offensives would appear to be defeats, would not sufficiently reduce German reserves and give the Germans too much time to recover. On 14 February, Joffre dropped the preparatory offensives idea in favour of a combined offensive, where the French and British Armies met, astride the Somme in Picardy, to begin around 1 July. A smaller attack from La Bassée to Ypres would take place a week or two earlier and the Tenth Army would be relieved in early June as more British divisions arrived in France. A week later, the Germans began the Battle of Verdun and the costly French defence of the Meuse Heights eventually reduced the French contribution to the Somme offensive from three armies to 13 divisions on the southern flank of 20 British divisions.

The chief of the Oberste Heeresleitung (OHL, the German General Staff), Erich von Falkenhayn, intended to end the war in 1916, by splitting the Anglo-French Entente, before its material superiority became unbeatable. Falkenhayn planned to defeat the large amount of reserves which the Entente could move into the path of a breakthrough, by threatening a sensitive point close to the existing front line, to provoke the French into costly counter-attacks against fortified German positions. Falkenhayn chose to attack towards Verdun, to take the Meuse Heights and make the city untenable. The French would have to conduct a counter-offensive on ground dominated by the Germans and ringed with masses of heavy artillery, leading to huge losses, bringing the French army close to collapse. The British would mount a hasty and equally-costly relief offensive, which Falkenhayn expected to occur south of Arras and be destroyed by the 6th Army (Generaloberst Rupprecht, Crown Prince of Bavaria), which held the Western Front from Hannescamps, 11 mi (18 km) south-west of Arras, northwards to St Eloi, south of Ypres.

Despite the certainty by mid-June of an Anglo-French attack on the Somme against the 2nd Army, Falkenhayn sent only four divisions as reinforcements, keeping eight in the western strategic reserve. No divisions were moved from the 6th Army, despite it holding a shorter line with 17 1/2 divisions and having three divisions of the OHL reserve in its rear area. The maintenance of the strength of the 6th Army at the expense of the 2nd Army, indicated that Falkenhayn intended the counter-offensive against the British to be made north of the Somme once the British offensive had been shattered. If such Franco-British defeats were not enough, the Westheer would attack the remnants of both armies and end the Entente for good. The unexpected duration of the Verdun offensive and the need to replace many exhausted units in the 5th Army, depleted the German strategic reserve stationed behind the 6th Army and reduced the German counter-offensive strategy north of the Somme to one of static defence.

=== Tactical developments ===
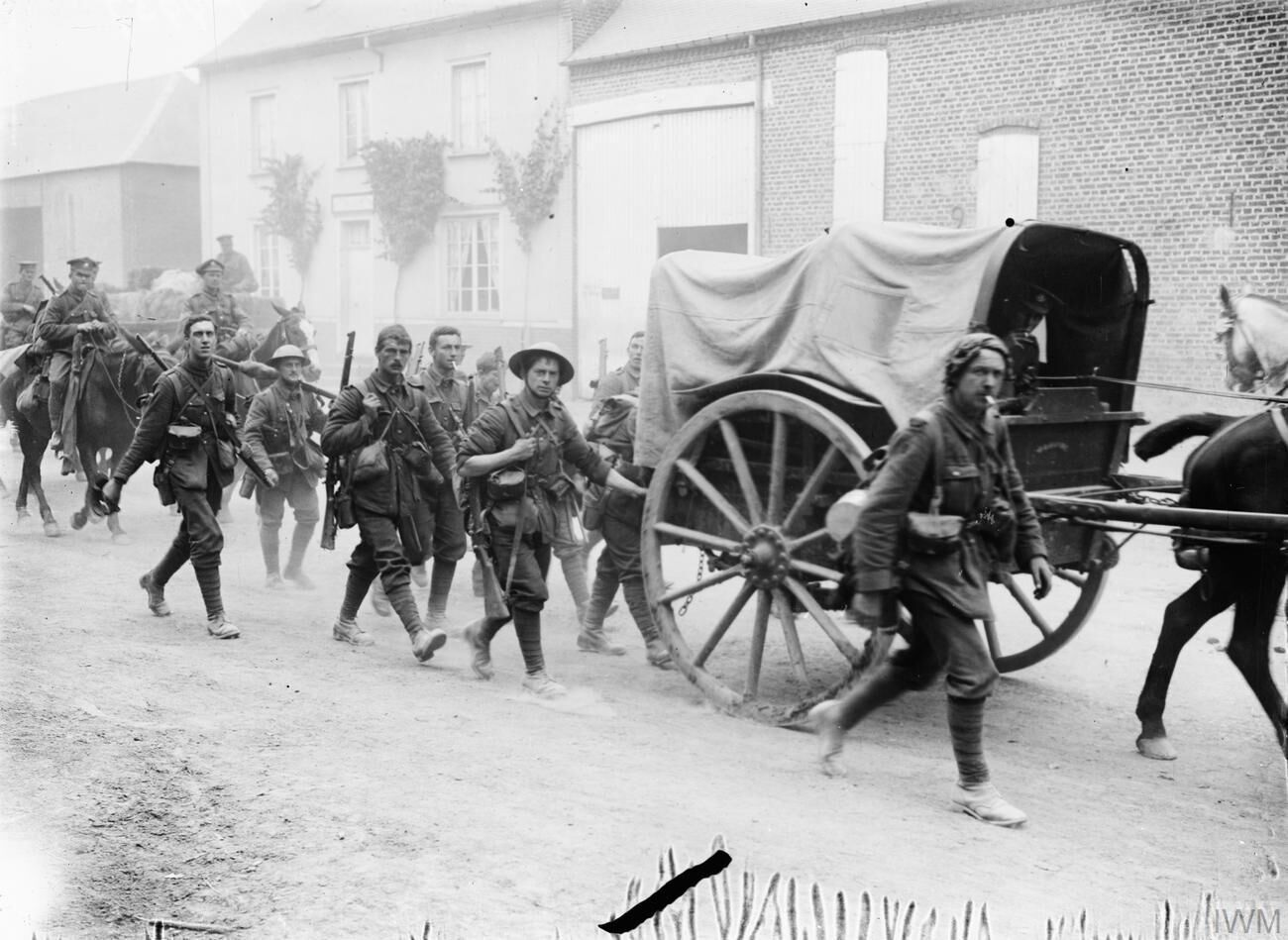
Men of the 10th (Service) Battalion, East Yorkshire Regiment, part of the 91st Brigade, 31st Division marching to the front line, 28 June 1916.

The original British Expeditionary Force (BEF) of six divisions and the Cavalry Division, had lost most of the army's pre-war regular soldiers in the battles of 1914 and 1915. The bulk of the British casualties were replaced by volunteers of the Territorial Force and Kitchener's Army of wartime volunteers, which had begun forming in August 1914. Rapid expansion created many vacancies for senior commands and specialist posts, which led to many retired officers (dug-outs) and inexperienced newcomers being appointed. In 1914, Haig had been a lieutenant-general in command of I Corps and was promoted to command the First Army in early 1915, then the BEF in December, which eventually comprised five field armies with sixty divisions. The swift increase in the size of the British Army reduced the average level of experience within it and created an acute equipment shortage. Many officers resorted to directive command to avoid delegating to novices, yet divisional commanders were given great latitude in training and planning for the attack of 1 July, since the heterogeneous nature of the army of 1916 made it impossible for corps and army commanders to know the capacity of each division.

Despite considerable debate among German staff officers, Falkenhayn continued his policy of unyielding defence. (Note: Falkenhayn implied after the war, that the psychology of German soldiers, shortage of manpower and lack of reserves made the policy inescapable, since the troops necessary to seal off breakthroughs did not exist. High losses incurred in holding ground by a policy of no retreat were preferable to even higher losses, voluntary withdrawals and the effect of a belief that soldiers had discretion to avoid battle. When a more flexible policy was substituted, decisions about withdrawal were still reserved for army commanders.) On the Somme front Falkenhayn's construction plan of January 1915 had been completed. Barbed wire obstacles had been enlarged from one belt 5–10 yd (4.6–9.1 m) wide to two belts, 30 yd (27 m) wide and about 15 yd (14 m) apart. Double and triple thickness wire was used and laid 3–5 ft (0.91–1.52 m) high. The front line had been increased from one trench line to a position with three trenches, 150–200 yd (140–180 m) apart, the first trench occupied by sentry groups, the second (Wohngraben) for the bulk of the front-trench garrison and the third trench for local reserves. Trenches were traversed and had sentry-posts in concrete recesses built into the parapet. Dugouts had been deepened from 6–9 ft (1.8–2.7 m) to 20–30 ft (6.1–9.1 m), 50 yd (46 m) apart and large enough for 25 men. An intermediate line of strongpoints (the Stützpunktlinie) about 1,000 yd (910 m) behind the front line was also built. Communication trenches ran back to the reserve line, renamed the second position, which was as well built and wired as the first position. The second position was beyond the range of Allied field artillery, to force an attacker to delay the infantry advance until sufficient guns and ammunition had been brought forward.

== Prelude ==
=== British preparations ===
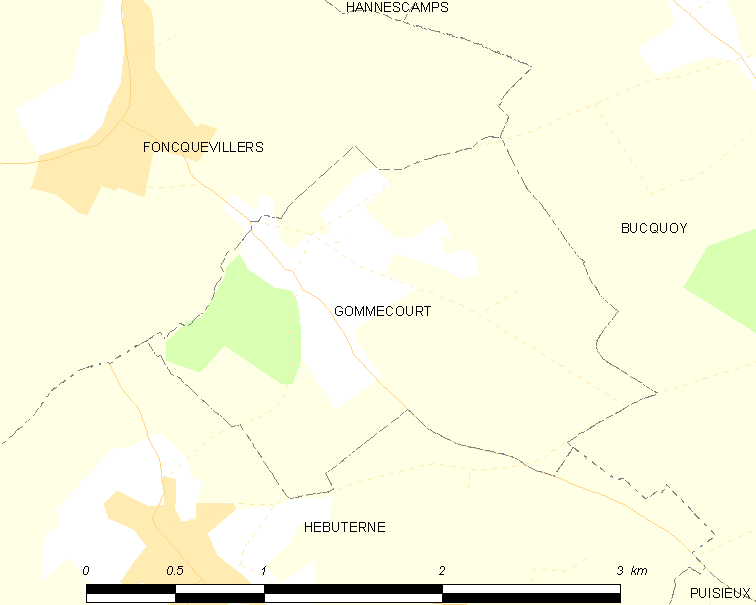
Modern map of Gommecourt and vicinity

A subsidiary attack was planned at Gommecourt, forgoing a counter-attack at Vimy Ridge to recapture the ground lost in Unternehmen Schleswig-Holstein. In early May, the 56th (1st London) Division (Major-General Charles Hull) and the 46th (North Midland) Division (Major-General Edward James Montagu-Stuart-Wortley) moved into the VII Corps area and took over the right flank of the 37th Division. The 46th (North Midland) Division had to dig many long and deep communication trenches to counter the German observation over the area but in the 56th (1st London) Division area as far as Nameless Farm, the trenches of both sides were level, with a dip in between and a hedge along the bottom.

Further on, both lines were on the west side of a wide valley between Rossignol Wood and Hébuterne, the British line on a forward and the German line on a reverse slope, with German artillery observation posts on the east side of the valley. The rear of the 56th (1st London) Division area was invisible to ground observers up to Hébuterne but watched by German balloon observers. The main British posts were along the eastern fringe of Hébuterne and the ridge running south; the valley slope drained water from the area but the 46th (North Midland) Division front was flat and boggy.

Apart from some 18-pounder field guns used for wire cutting, the corps artillery was under the command of the Corps Commander Royal Artillery (CCRA) until zero hour, when the divisional HQs took back command. The corps had the 19th, 35th, 39th and 48th Heavy Artillery Groups (HAGs), the 19th and 35th firing on trenches and villages, the rest being reserved for counter-battery fire. (Note: Howitzers: two 15-inch, two 12-inch, twenty-four 9.2-inch, twenty-eight 6-inch. Guns: two 9.2-inch, two 6-inch, twelve 60-pounders, twelve 4.7-inch.) The British artillery was unable to suppress the German heavy artillery, which was beyond the range of 60-pounders and 6-inch howitzers, leaving only the small number of super-heavy guns capable of longer-range counter-battery fire. Both British divisions were vulnerable to enfilade fire beyond the flanks of the corps, the 56th (1st London) Division from guns near Puisieux 3 mi (4.8 km) south-east of Gommecourt and the 46th (North Midland) Division from German batteries opposite the 37th Division around Adinfer Wood, some of the German 5.9-inch howitzers protected by concrete casemates. The commander of the 46th (North Midland) Division directed that the German front trench was not to be bombarded so it could be used by the division and the bombardment was concentrated on the German reserve and support lines.

Half of the guns of the HAGs firing on trenches were to lift two minutes before zero hour and the rest at zero hour to the east half of the inner flanks of the first objective at Ems Trench south of the village and Oxus Trench north of Gommecourt. The guns would then switch to the second objective for 15 minutes and then move forward while the line was being consolidated. The artillery bombarding Gommecourt Park was to keep firing for three hours after zero. The 18-pounder field guns of both divisions were to fire in short lifts, those of the 56th (1st London) Division to lift at zero hour from the front trench to the reserve trench for four minutes and then for six minutes just beyond. The German communication trenches were to be swept for 12 minutes and then the bombardment was to move inwards to the second objective for eight minutes. The 46th (North Midland) Division field guns were to lift from the front to the support trench at zero and after three minutes to the reserve trench, five minutes after that to fall beyond the reserve trench until zero plus 20 minutes. At zero plus 25, the guns were to lift to the second objective until zero plus 30 minutes.

=== British plan ===
Weather (23 June – 1 July 1916)
Date	Rain (mm)	°F °C	
23 June	2.0	79–55; 26–13	wind
24	1.0	72–52; 22–11	dull
25	1.0	71–54; 22–12	wind
26	6.0	72–52; 22–11	dull
27	8.0	68–54; 20–12	dull
28	2.0	68–50; 20–10	dull
29	0.1	66–52; 19–11	dull wind
30	0.0	72–48; 22–9	dull wind
1 July	0.0	79–52; 26–11	fine

The VII Corps of the Third Army was to carry out the diversion, north of a 2 mi (3.2 km) gap, held by two battalions, to the northern flank of the VIII Corps, which was to attack Serre and Beaumont-Hamel. Snow was not informed of the attack until 28 April, although the attack was postponed to 1 July. The objective was to

... assist in the operations of the Fourth Army by diverting against itself the fire of artillery and infantry which might otherwise be directed against the left flank of the main attack near Serre.

— GHQ

and nothing of the main attack depended on success at Gommecourt; success would only shorten the line by cutting off the salient. No force was provided to attack southwards to roll up the German lines to the south or capture the ridge running south-east behind the village. Snow and Allenby were ready to attack Gommecourt but suggested to GHQ that an operation closer to Arras would work better and be less costly. Haig rejected the alternative because it would have no influence on the German artillery close to Gommecourt, which was in range of the VIII Corps attack.

The 56th (1st London) Division attack was to be made by the 168th (2nd London) Brigade and the 169th (3rd London) Brigade on a 900 yd (820 m) front from the south edge of Gommecourt Park to the south-east. The 167th (1st London) Brigade was in reserve, with two battalions detached to follow up the attacking brigades and occupy the German front line once the leading troops had moved on or provide working and carrying parties. The 168th Brigade was to capture the German third trench from Fame to Felon and set up strong points on the flanks and in the centre near Nameless Farm and dig a trench across no man's land to provide flank protection in the right. (VII Corps named German trenches systematically, on the right names were given with the spelling Fa, then groups of Fe, Fi and Fo. Communication trenches were named after rivers beginning with A then E, I and O; Fe-lon Trench was in front of E-lbe communication trench) The 169th Brigade was to reach the third trench from Fame to Fellow and Feud, to Gommecourt cemetery on the left of the 168th Brigade and make three strong points on the left flank near the cemetery, the south-west corner of The Maze and the south of Gommecourt Park. The brigade was then to move forward on the left to the Quadrilateral, a strong point behind the 1st Switch Line east of The Maze. Later on it was to advance and rendezvous with the right of the 46th (North Midland) Division, where Indus Trench cut through the 1st Switch Line at Fillet and Fill.

The 46th (North Midland) Division attack was to be conducted by the 137th Brigade with the 1/6th South Staffordshire and the 1/6th North Staffordshire, with the 1/5th South Staffordshire and 1/5th North Staffordshire in support. The 1/5th Lincolnshire was attached from the 138th (Lincoln and Leicester) Brigade in reserve for carrying parties. In the 139th (Sherwood Foresters) Brigade, the 1/5th and 1/7th Sherwood Foresters were to attack with the 1/6th Sherwood Foresters in support and the 1/8th Sherwood Foresters in reserve, with one battalion to hold the line between the attacking divisions; one battalion was to dig a communication trench parallel to the Foncquevillers–Gommecourt road, from the sugar mill after the attack (a start was made but German artillery fire made it impossible to continue). The 138th Brigade was in reserve less two battalions and each brigade had a Field Company RE and the 1/1st Monmouthshire Regiment (Monmouth), the divisional pioneer battalion, was to dig communication trenches.

The division was to form a pocket in the German defences north of Gommecourt from the front trench along the Fonquevillers–Gommecourt road to the north-east of Gommecourt and from there 500 yd (460 m) along Oxus Trench to angle back along Fortress, Foreign and Ouse trenches to the British front line, with ten strong points built into the new line. The second objective was to meet the 56th (1st London) Division in the 1st Switch Line by advancing southwards from Oxus Trench along Fill Trench. At zero plus three hours (10:30 a.m.) when the bombardment ended, the attack on Gommecourt village was to begin. The first six waves of infantry were to start from the advanced trench dug in no man's land but it was in such poor condition that the 1/6th South Staffordshire decided to start from the front line and creep forward to the jumping-off position. Assembly trenches dug 150 yd (140 m) behind the British front line had also been ruined by the heavy rains and tapes were laid the night before the attack to help the second and later waves to align. Four minutes before zero the second wave was to advance from the front line and take post 80 yd (73 m) behind the first wave; the rest of the waves were to follow in the open.

The 37th Division on the northern (left) flank of VII Corps, held a front 4.5 mi (7.2 km) from north of Gommecourt to Ransart and was to induce the Germans to expect an attack by simulating preparations. No man's land was too wide for an attack, being 1,000–500 yd (910–460 m) deep from right to left and an advanced trench was dug, similar to the one dug by the 56th (1st London) Division. Periodic smoke and gas discharges were to be made and wire-cutting bombardments fired. Moving the gas cylinders was so difficult that batmen, grooms and other non-combatant troops were pressed into service. For five days before Z Day, trench mortars and machine-guns were to fire on either side of the Monchy Salient. The bombardments were gradually to increase and the divisional artillery was to bombard German positions, roads and the vicinity of Essarts. Smoke was to be released five minutes before zero hour and infantry were to be held ready to support the 46th (North Midland) Division. VII Corps made no attempt at concealment and in the middle of June the 2nd Guard Reserve Division and its six heavy artillery batteries moved up between the 52nd and 111th divisions. Four days before zero hour, Snow told Haig that "They know we are coming all right".

=== German preparations ===
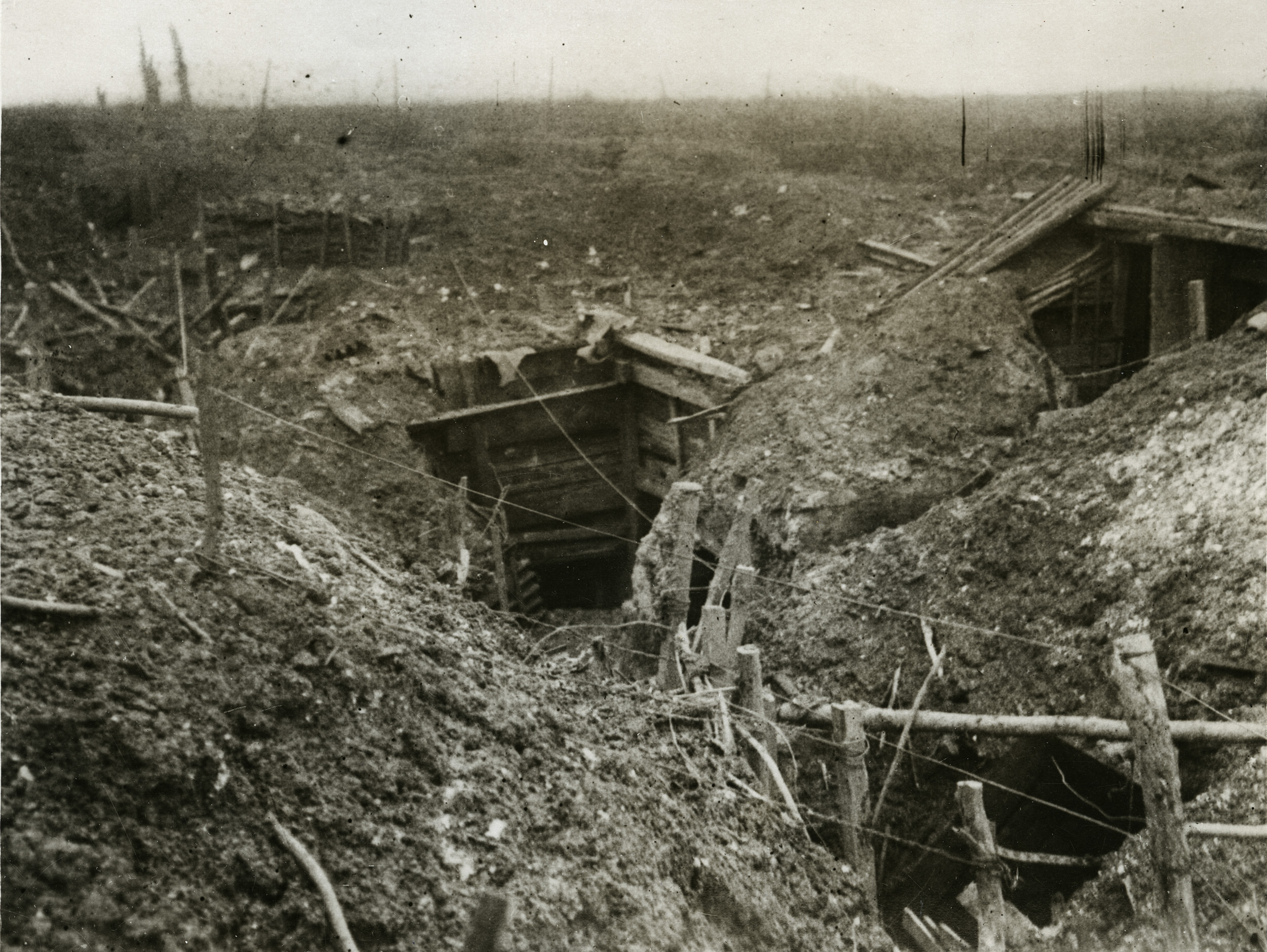
Official Photographs taken on the Front in France, a German front line trench before Gommecourt

In May, the 2nd Guard Reserve Division (General Richard von Süßkind-Schwendi), made up of pre-war conscripts from Guards regiments, was posted to the Gommecourt Salient to join the XIV Reserve Corps (Generalleutnant Hermann von Stein). The south side of the salient was held by Baden Infantry Regiment 170 (BIR 170) of the 52nd Division (Generalleutnant Karl von Borries) and the centre and north by Reserve Infantry Regiment 55 (RIR 55) and Reserve Infantry Regiment 91 (RIR 91) of the 2nd Guard Reserve Division, with the 111th Division on the northern flank. The 52nd and 111th divisions were triangular divisions with three regiments, two occupying the front line with one in reserve and the 2nd Guard Reserve Division was a square division with four regiments. Reserve Guard Regiment 77 (RGR 77) was north of the salient and Reserve Guard Regiment 15 (RGR 15) was in reserve.

The Guards had a good view of the British positions beyond no man's land, which was unusually wide; from the first line, 2nd Switch Line and the Intermediate Line, between which were many communication trenches, to allow the defenders to seal off a break in and surround the attackers. A field fortification, the Kernwerk (Core Work, the Maze to the British), was dug in the east end of Gommecourt and equipped for all-round defence. The infantry had dug deep dugouts, many with electric lighting and underground kitchens had been built, along with accommodation for the garrisons. Most of the dugouts were connected so that men and equipment could be moved around, safe from bombardment. RGR 77 held the ground to the north end of the village to the junction with the 111th Division. In the centre, RIR 91 occupied sectors X1 – X6 and RIR 55 held sectors G1 – G5 on the left. The regiment connected at Roth Graben with BIR 170 of the 52nd Division, which held sectors N1 – N4 and RGR 15 was in close reserve.

On 24 June, the Germans captured a wounded soldier from a 1/5th North Staffordshire wiring party, who had been left behind and struggled towards the wrong front line. The private was interrogated, while semi-conscious through loss of blood, giving details of the British attack. On the north side of the village, the barbed wire in front of RIR 91 had been badly cut and the trenches flattened but most of the dugouts remained intact, including one penetrated by a heavy shell which failed to detonate. In the village, the British bombardment caused only fifty casualties (six killed) to RIR 55 and on 1 July, the bombardment rose to a new height of intensity, particularly on sectors G1 and G5, which were also hit by trench mortars, which was taken to mean that the attack was imminent.

== Battle ==
=== 1 July ===
==== 56th (1st London) Division ====
At 7:20 a.m. a smoke screen was begun from the left flank and after five minutes had covered the attack front. At 7:25 a.m. the leading troops went over the top, through a German barrage which had begun to fall on the front, second and communication trenches. The troops moved forward to tapes in no man's land and lay down. At 7:30 a.m. the troops rose and began the attack, finding most of the German wire well cut, Bangalore torpedoes having been used the night previous to cut the worst tangles. The German infantry had met the wire cutting vigorously, putting out concertina wire and fresh tangles in the gaps. Some troops had to bunch up to get through the gaps and some strayed in the smoke but the two leading 168th Brigade battalions were through quickly, only the two battalions following in support and reserve being delayed. The British got into the German front trench with seconds to spare and the remnants of the front position except for Nameless Farm captured. The Germans in the third trench had been able to emerge from shelter and were overrun by rifle fire and rushes by parties, troops moving up communication trenches eventually overcoming the defenders but Nameless Farm was never captured. The farm cellars had been fortified and with shell-hole positions and part of a trench behind, the garrison held out, tired the attackers and reduced their supply of grenades.

The attackers put out signals to the RFC crews observing the attack, sent runners to battalion headquarters and at 9:30 a.m. boards were hoisted in the three front trenches to show that they had been captured and consolidation began. About 300 unwounded prisoners were escorted back but unfortunately about eighty were killed in no man's land by German artillery-fire and the rest were sent back to their dugouts. The German bombardment increased to the point that the party digging the trench to protect the right flank could not begin and many of the bombers ready to advance at 9:30 a.m. were also caught in no man's land, became casualties and could not participate in the next stage of the attack against the Quadrilateral. Some parties attacked from the third trench but only one party, moving via the cemetery, reached it where it was destroyed. The attacking battalions and the reinforcements that got across to the German side were cut off by the German standing barrages on no man's land and the captured trenches. Carrying parties tried to cross with ammunition and bombs but were killed and from the front and flanks, German troops began to move towards the 168th and 169th brigade troops, who could not man a continuous line.

==== 2nd Guard Reserve Division (south) ====
Much of the wire in front of sector G5 had been cut, dug-out entrances demolished and the trenches flattened, particularly by British enfilade fire from Foncquevillers, nearly every shell hitting the trenches, making it impossible to keep sentries above ground. Smoke and dust shielded the British infantry but the 6th and 8th companies of RIR 55 saw then in time to deploy and begin rapid fire and send SOS signals to the artillery, which drove back the British. A platoon on the left of the 8th Company was trapped in their dugout and overrun before they could dig themselves out. Only a few men were able to prepare a trench block but they managed to repulse the British attacking from Patroullien Wäldchen (Patrol Wood). At 7:30 a.m. an artillery observer reported that about two British companies had captured N1 and N2 and got forward between Süd Graben and Roth Graben through the cemetery to the I Garde Stellung and the Kernwerk. RIR 55 lost about 300 prisoners in the first rush but the Germans in the third trench were ready for them and were only dislodged by flanking attacks along communication trenches. The RIR 55 pioneer company with about 150 men and a company of Pioneer Battalion 10 managed to stop the British advance.

Attempts by the 56th (1st London) Division troops to broaden the penetration were thwarted and at 7:40 a.m. the commander of II Battalion, RIR 55 ordered a counter-attack from the Kernwerk but the local commander of the 7th Company concentrated on containing the British advance and managed to force the British under cover, 330 ft (100 m) short of the Kernwerk, where they established two Lewis guns between Hauser Graben (House Trench) and Süd Graben (South Trench). In the smoke and dust, with the telephone lines cut the Germans used runners to report to battalion headquarters and the various commanders issued counter-attack orders in ignorance of each other's decisions. BIR 170 had similar trouble when the initial British rush led to N1 being rolled up from the left around 8:00 a.m. and forced back the garrisons of the first and second trenches back into Helmut Graben. Attempts to get into N2 failed against accurate small-arms fire but the 5th Company, BIR 170 on the right of sector N3 were blinded by the British smoke and forced back to the third trench. Parties of British troops then swung north and attacked N2 at Albrechts Graben but the defenders, who had been forced out of the first trench managed to hold on. The rest of the 5th Company, BIR 170 held the left side of N3 and those in N4 repulsed the British attack as the German artillery barraged no man's land and prevented reinforcements moving to the support of the British inside the German defences.

==== 46th (North Midland) Division ====
The 137th Brigade attack went wrong from the start; the smoke screen was so dense at first that men got lost and the advance was neither uniform nor simultaneous. After thirty minutes the smoke blew back and dispersed. The Germans were ready, mud around the British front line and in no man's land slowed the advance. The Germans emerged from shelter when the British were only halfway across. The troops who managed to advance across no man's land found that the German wire was smashed about, uncut or had been repaired. The Germans were deployed nearly as soon as the British guns lifted and German barrage fire began on the British lines. The German shelling was so bad that the third wave was ordered up communication trenches instead of advancing in the open. Before the wave managed to leave the advanced trench, the German barrage began to fall on no man's land and increase in intensity. German machine-gun fire from The Z, a spur beyond the left flank of the attack was most effective, few of the rear British waves got across and parts of the first three waves either stayed in the British front line or sought cover in no man's land. The leading troops of the 1/6th South and the 1/6th North Staffordshire were caught by flanking fire from the south but got to the German wire and were shot down or killed with hand grenades. A few men broke into the front trench but unsupported, were forced out or destroyed.

The first three waves of the 139th Brigade got into the German front line, despite many casualties and parties moved forward to the second trench, some troops straying to the left and being reported in The Z and Little Z by RFC observation crews, which stopped the British artillery from firing on 'The Z to suppress the German machine-guns. The following waves were also met by massed fire, the fourth wave never got forward as a formation and hardly any of the fifth and sixth waves got beyond the advanced trench. Contact with those who were forward was lost, despite the multiplicity of means used. Telephones, flags, lamps, discs, shutters, pigeons, flares and rockets all failed due to casualties and no runner got through. All that was seen were two flares at 11:00 a.m. by an observation crew. The Sherwood Foresters who were in the German front position were caught from behind by Germans coming up from their shelters, which should have been patrolled by the rear waves trapped in no man's land. The Germans prevented more troops from crossing into the German front position and were seen bombing the British troops who had taken cover in shell-holes near the German wire.

By 9:00 a.m. the 137th Brigade commander was sure that the attack was a failure and that this would add to the problems of the 139th Brigade and the 56th (1st London) Division. He decided on a new attack with the 1/5th South, 1/5th North Staffordshire and the rear waves of the 1/5th Leicester that was still held up in the British front line and no man's land. Preparations began to bring back the creeping barrage but the men had to be rearranged in trenches which were crowded and full of mud, which took much time. Many of the units had suffered casualties and the 1/5th North Staffordshire had been reduced to 200 men. Just after the orders were issued, the two Staffordshire battalion commanders were wounded, which caused another delay until Lieutenant-Colonel C. H. Jones (1/5th Leicester) could be found and two officers from the brigade HQ sent to assist form four waves. The man had trained for weeks for particular tasks and took time to realise that all that had been overtaken by events. The rear lines and the carrying parties were blocking the trenches and with the mud and German shelling could only be cleared slowly.

The 139th Brigade had got into the German front line but sending over supplies and reinforcements could not be done without another smoke screen, since there were not even shell-holes for cover except for a 100 yd (91 m) patch in front of the British front line and a similar one 50–70 yd (46–64 m) deep along the German front line; the 300–400 yd (270–370 m) of no man's land in between being bare. Brigadier-General Shipley decided to delay until enough smoke bombs had been obtained. Before long it was realised that brigade operations were impossible and Montagu-Stuart-Wortley decided to co-ordinate a divisional attack at 12:15 p.m., with divisional and corps artillery in support but with no fresh troops. The 137th Brigade was to attack under cover of smoke and the 139th Brigade was to send troops for carrying parties. The attack was postponed until 1:15 p.m. but then the 139th Brigade reported that there were still no smoke bombs, neither brigade attacked and after more delays, zero was set for 3:30 p.m. Ten minutes before zero, Stokes mortars began the smoke bombardment and a thin continuous screen was achieved on the front of the 137th Brigade but only twenty bombs had been found for the 139th Brigade mortars and the smoke was wholly insufficient and Shipley ordered the advance to be stopped.

One battalion commander unilaterally cancelled the attack before the order arrived and of twenty men who crossed the parapet on the left, 18 were shot down by machine-gun fire or shrapnel in 30 yd (27 m). On the right, the acting commander of the 1/5th South Staffordshire was wounded just before zero and giving no signal, no-one moved, all waiting for someone else to give the order. The commander of the 1/5th North Staffordshire, seeing no movement, stopped the advance and waited on events. Snow, the corps commander, had heard that the 56th (1st London) Division had been repulsed, ordered the 137th Brigade attack to be cancelled, which arrived just in time, since the British re-bombardment from 3:00–3:00 p.m. and the new smoke barrage had alerted the Germans who placed another standing barrage in no man's land. With smoke obscuration, a 150 yd (140 m) rush might have succeeded but the 350 yd (320 m) distance was impossible. None of the 1/5th and 1/7th Sherwood Foresters who got into the German defences came back but a few trickled back from shell-holes after dark, the battalions losing about 80 per cent casualties, including both commanders killed.

==== 2nd Guard Reserve Division (north) ====
Against the 46th (North Midland) Division, the right flank units of RIR 55 and RGR 91 were able to get out of their deep dugouts in sectors X1 to G1 quickly enough to engage the British as they were crossing no man's land. Trench sentries had kept watch despite the artillery-fire and as soon as the bombardment lifted they gave the alarm and the men not slowed by damaged dugout entrances, took post within two minutes. The Germans sent up red SOS flares to the German artillery, which had already commenced harassing fire and the gunners responded with fire at maximum rate from the 28 field and 22 heavy guns of Gruppe Süd and Gruppe Nord covering the 1.2 mi (2 km) front. About 35 British troops got through the wire into the front trench near Schwalben Nest ((Swallow's Nest, the Z to the British) and were swiftly counter-attacked and driven back into shell-holes near the wire, where they were killed or captured. Enfilade fire from machine-guns in Schwalben Nest swept no man's land made it impossible for the British to cross and doomed those already in the German defences. The British mopping up parties who should have searched the dug-outs in the German front line never arrived and the parties underground who had to dig themselves out, now emerged behind the foremost British troops and joined in the return fire against the British in no man's land.

The British smoke screen and dust limited visibility and about 25 men got into the German line at X3, from where they tried to outflank X2 but the 12th Company of RGR 91 and part of the 9th Company saw the danger, outnumbered and overran the party. At X4, the British got as far as the second trench and set up a Lewis gun to fire on the north-west part of Gommecourt Wood. The 5th and 6th companies of II Battalion, RGR 91 counter-attacked over the open, knocked out the Lewis gun and pushed back the British to the front trench, then back through the wire, from where a few of the British managed to get away. On the right flank of RIR 55, the troops in G1 got out of their dug-outs quickly and opened rapid fire on the British, causing many casualties but not stopping some troops getting into Einbecker Graben. Quickly a platoon of the 2nd Company RIR 55 counter-attacked in the open and overran the party, taking a few prisoners. As the smoke dispersed, the Germans regained the view over the British lines and small-arms fire combined with the German standing barrage in no man's land, prevented reinforcements crossing. By noon, reports began to arrive from the front line that the position had been restored.

==== 56th (1st London) Division (afternoon) ====
The German success against the 46th (North Midland) Division attack left the 56th (1st London) Division dependent on the second attack being prepared by the 46th (North Midland) Division. On the 56th (1st London) Division front, German reinforcements of the 2nd Guard Reserve Division had begun to move from the north, east and south, soon after zero hour at 7:30 a.m. About thirteen German infantry companies began to counter-attack the 56th (1st London) Division lodgement with short bursts of intense artillery-fire followed by infantry bombing attacks. One or two guns about 3,000 yd (1.7 mi; 2.7 km) south-east of the top of Puisieux valley firing in enfilade were particularly deadly. A standing barrage along no man's land made the passage of supplies and reinforcements extremely difficult from the start but around 9:00 a.m. two platoons and a machine-gun crew managed to cross and were the last parties to succeed, an attempt at 2:00 p.m. being destroyed by machine-gun fire from Gommecourt Park and the guns at Puisieux. Attempts by troops to bring in wounded to the British front line were tolerated by the Germans, a German medical officer under a white flag, saying that troops on the British side of the wire could be rescued as long as there was a cease-fire but the truce was broken by a British field gun bombarding the German front trench.

The British parties in the German trenches held off the German counter-attacks while their bomb supply and German grenades found in dug outs remained but by noon, the British began to signal SOS bombs to the British front line. The Germans fired three barrages through the British positions followed by a counter-attack from the park, which prised the British out of the German third line. The infantry received little artillery support because VII Corps HQ had no knowledge of the German attack and the guns continued to barrage the communication and switch trenches, along which German reinforcements were seen moving all day. Reconnaissance reports from British aircrew were deemed too vague to attempt artillery support. The four 18-pounders and the howitzer battery which came under the command of the 169th Brigade after zero hour were also bombarding German reinforcements. At 2:00 p.m. the 168th and 169th brigade troops still held the second and first trenches and the south end of Gommecourt Park. Groups of wounded men had been filtering back across no man's land since 1:00 p.m. but nothing could be seen of the 46th (North Midland) Division and news arrived that the VIII Corps attack at Serre to the south had failed. (Note: Later, when the German front line was seen to be full of Germans, firing at the 56th (1st London) Division troops trying to retreat over no man's land, the guns were so short of ammunition that no covering fire was provided, in case the Germans followed up with an attack.)

The parties in the German trenches were trapped and by 4:00 p.m. the Germans had recovered the second trench and established footings in the first trench. The 169th Brigade collected orderlies, clerks and servants to make a last attempt to get across to the British still holding out. VIII Corps had sent a message to Snow that another attack would be made after dark and with two fresh battalions of the 56th (1st London) Division and the 3 1/2 46th (North Midland) Division battalions remaining. Snow ordered both divisions to be ready to support the VIII Corps attack. The remaining 75 British troops in the German trenches had been compressed into part of Ferret Trench 200 yd (180 m) from the park. The wounded were evacuated and the last Lewis guns set up on the parapet and parados (a bank behind the trench protecting the occupants from fire from the rear) of the trench. German counter-attacks drove them into shell-holes near the German wire, where they held on until about 9:30 p.m. and then retreated after using the last of their ammunition, losing many men in no man's land.

==== 2nd Guard Reserve Division (afternoon) ====
The communication difficulties of the German commanders began to be resolved and around 10:00 a.m., the commanders of BIR 170, RIR 55, GIR 15 and GIR 77 began to plan a co-ordinated attack on the British lodgement. Major Tauscher, the commander of III Battalion RIR 55 was ordered forward from Bucquoy to expel the British from G5. Reinforcements from RGR 15 were sent along Blücher Graben and Ihlenfeld Graben and more troops were moved forward to Bucquoy. At 11:00 a.m. Taucher reached the reserve battle headquarters at Hill 147, west of the Birkenwald (Birch Wood), to co-ordinate the operation. As the British were well dug in, an attack south from the Kernwerk was not feasible and Tauscher found that the British were in N1 and N3 but this clarified the situation and he ordered attacks along Roth Graben and Lehman Graben, with reserves to be moved forward as they were needed. The attacks made slow progress and were costly for both sides as the British were forced back in hand-to-hand fighting. BIR 170 attacked at the same time as RIR 55, recaptured part of N2 by 4:30 p.m. and N1 by 6:00 p.m..

In N3 the British held all three trenches near Bock Farm (Nameless Farm to the British) and during the afternoon tried to reinforce the troops in the German lines but each attempt was a costly failure and a German medical officer appeared under a white flag and offered a truce to bring in the wounded which succeeded for a time and then a British gun opened fire and the rest of the wounded had to wait for dark. The headquarters of BIR 170 was eventually informed of the loss of N3 and sent forward the II Battalion and then a company from GIR 15 at 3:00 p.m. After a brief hurricane bombardment the Germans attacked N2 and N3, recapturing them by 6:00 p.m. On the north side of the British lodgement the counter-attack on G5 had succeeded by 4:00 p.m. leaving the last British troops in the second trench and Süd Graben which were attacked at 7:00 p.m. and re-captured. Isolated parties of British troops remained in pockets which were pushed back to the front line and some walking wounded tried to get back across no man's land, with left the last organised party of 75 men in Ferret Trench giving covering fire. The party was pushed into shell-holes and ran the gauntlet across no man's land, losing many casualties to small-arms fire, the survivors reaching the British lines at 9:30 p.m.

==== 1/2 July ====
After night fell, the 138th Brigade took over the 46th (North Midland) Division front with a battalion of the 139th Brigade attached and Brigadier-General G. C. Kemp sent the 1/5th Lincoln forward with the 1/5th Leicester as a right flank guard just after midnight, to reach the men thought still to be holding out in the German front line. The Lincoln reached the German wire, found it uncut and the trenches full of alert German troops, who sent up flares and opened fire as soon as they detected the British movement. The British were ordered to lie down and wait, eventually being ordered back, the 1/5th Lincoln suffering many losses but managing to bring back their wounded. Collecting wounded was most difficult until after midnight, when as dawn appeared, the 2nd Guard Reserve Division again gave assistance, hoisting a Red Cross flag opposite the 46th (North Midland) Division. Both sides sent out parties to rescue the wounded and nearly all of the British survivors were taken in. (Note: Several days later, a German aircraft dropped a list of prisoners taken at Gommecourt and the RFC did the same.)

=== Air operations ===
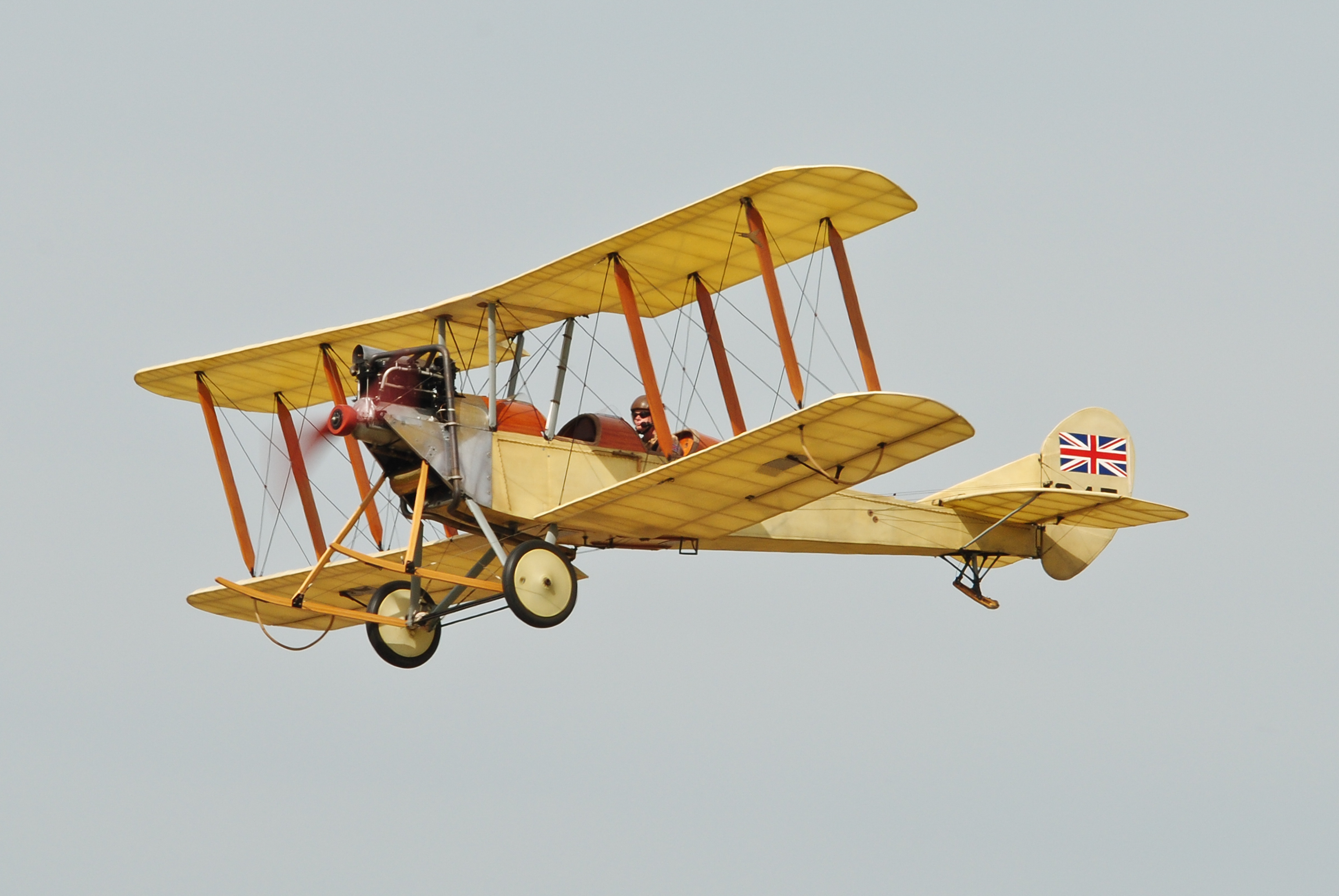
Replica B.E.2c similar to those flown by 8 Squadron RFC (Shoreham Airshow, 2013

The operations at Gommecourt were observed by 8 Squadron, Royal Flying Corps (RFC) and when the weather improved on 30 June, the squadron obtained a good set of photographs of the German defences and sent prints to VII Corps headquarters before dawn. From 6:45–3:25 p.m., a standing patrol of one B.E.2c contact patrol aircraft over each division was maintained, then reduced to one aircraft only. The British infantry carried red flares to indicate their positions to the contact aeroplanes but none was ignited; the crews had to descend low enough to see the colour of troops' uniforms.

The aircraft had to fly through air disturbed by the barrage and were tossed around, then riddled with bullets when the infantry turned out to be German, three aircraft being hit by small-arms fire and made unserviceable but none shot down. An aircraft flying back from the front line to drop a message flew into the 5 Section balloon cable near St Amand, spun down it and crashed but the crew escaped injury. Over the 46th (North Midland) Division, the observers watched the first waves of the Sherwood Foresters overrun the German front line and slowly reach the north end of Gommecourt Wood.

German infantry were seen to emerge from dugouts and re-occupy the front line behind them and the following waves of British infantry being pinned down in no man's land, because of the barrage-fire of the German artillery, machine-gun and rifle fire. The Sherwood Foresters fought on all day but no reinforcements got through and the survivors eventually surrendered. Observers watching the 56th (1st London) Division area to the south saw the infantry advance under a smoke screen and fight their way through the German first, second and third lines. The German artillery barrage on no man's land increased in intensity and German infantry were seen to rally and counter-attack. In desperate fighting, the British fliers watched Germans regain the third line after noon and gradually force back the British out of the German front line by late evening.

== Aftermath ==
=== Analysis ===
In 1965, Charles Carrington wrote in Soldier from the Wars Returning, that RIR 55 gave the best exhibition of minor tactics that he had seen in two world wars, then let the 56th (1st London) Division recover wounded, helping some to get back to the British lines. In 2005, Prior and Wilson wrote that the diversion succeeded to the extent that an extra German division was moved into the front line but the defence of the salient was based on artillery rather than infantry. No guns were moved to counter the British threat and Prior and Wilson wrote that a feint would have been sufficient. In 2013, Ralph Whitehead wrote that the British attack diverted German units but two of the five regiments that defended Gommecourt had negligible losses and were available for re-deployment. For about 1,257 casualties, the German defenders had inflicted 6,769 casualties on the British.

I Battalion, RGR 77 took part in the defence of Pozières from 7 to 21 July, II Battalion, RGR 77 was stationed at Bazentin and Martinpuich from 8 to 23 July and the III Battalion held ground around Pozières, Martinpuich and Bazentin from 14 to 23 July. RGR 15 fought at Feste Schwaben (Schwaben Redoubt), Thiepval, Ovillers and Pozières from 8 to 22 July. RIR 91 was ordered to the Somme on 10 July and two companies took part in an abortive counter-attack from Bazentin Wood on 12 July, suffering many casualties. In August, I Battalion, RGR 15 fought at Martinpuich, the II Battalion at Thiepval-Süd and the rest of the 2nd Guard Reserve Division spent periods on the Somme until the end of the battle. RGR 15 returned to Gommecourt and occupied the defences from 1 September 1916 to 23 February 1917.

=== Casualties ===
Writing in 1932, the British official historian, James Edmonds, recorded that the 46th (North Midland) Division suffered 2,445 casualties and the 56th (1st London) Division 4,314 casualties. In 2006, Alan Macdonald used the figures of the 56th divisional adjutant who calculated 4,243 casualties, 71 fewer than that given in the official history which is unusual, since some of the men reported missing turned up later and were removed from the list. Macdonald suggested that from his scrutiny of war diaries, regimental histories, the records of the Commonwealth War Graves Commission and other records, the casualties on 1 July were c. 4,300 of whom over 1,300 men were killed or died of wounds. RIR 55 and 91 and BIR 170 had 1,241 casualties. In 2013, Ralph Whitehead wrote that the Germans took 267 prisoners and lost 199 men missing and taken prisoner. BIR 170 reported 650 casualties, RIR 55 lost 455 men and RIR 91 had about 150 casualties, a total of 1,255 men. RGR 15 and RGR 77 had 22 casualties, no more than could be expected from normal wastage. The 2nd Guard Reserve Division lost three light field howitzers damaged; a 77 mm field gun and a 90 mm gun were knocked out by shell hits.

=== Occupation of Gommecourt ===
Bassin de la Somme; shows the Ancre River

In January and February 1917, British attacks in the Ancre Valley had taken place against exhausted German troops holding the poor defensive positions left over from the fighting in 1916; many of the German troops in the valley were in waterlogged trenches suffering from exhaustion, intestinal complaints, hunger and thirst, leading to low morale and an unusual willingness to surrender. On 27 February, a two-man patrol of the 18th Battalion, Durham Light Infantry, 93rd Brigade, 31st Division went through Gommecourt Park and found the village deserted. The 1/4th Leicester relieved the 1/5th Leicester of the 138th Brigade, 46th (North Midland) Division at 12:15 p.m. and at 9:55 p.m., C and D companies advanced towards Gommecourt by platoons, without artillery preparation. (Note: The 138th Brigade of the 46th (North Midland) Division had been attached to the 58th (2/1st London) Division during its relief of the 46th (North Midland) Division. The 46th divisional HQ was brought back into line, because the 58th Division was the least experienced division in France.)

The Leicester occupied about 350 yd (320 m) of the German front line at Gommecourt and then advanced another 200 yd (180 m) with no casualties. As the Germans retreated to R I Stellung, about 400 men occupied the village. At 1:30 a.m. A and B companies of the 1/4th Lincoln at Fonquevillers, received the news and B Company began to dig a communication trench across no man's land; A Company formed carrying parties to bring up supplies. Rupprecht advocated a withdrawal to the Siegfriedstellung on 28 January, which was authorised by Ludendorff on 4 February, the first Alberich day being set for five days later. The retirement was conducted in a slow and deliberate manner, through a series of defensive lines over 25 mi (40 km) at the deepest point, behind rear-guards, local counter-attacks and the demolitions of the Alberich plan.

=== 1918 ===
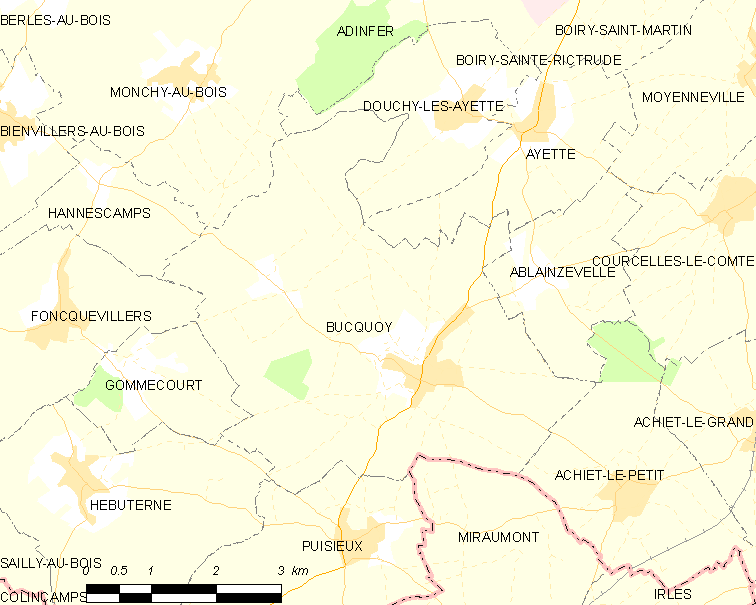
Modern map of Gommecourt and vicinity

During the German spring offensive (1 March – 18 July), the purple line, an improvised defensive position, was dug to the south, east and north of Gommecourt. The 62nd (2nd West Riding) Division (Major-General Walter Braithwaite) was dug in around the eastern fringe of Bucquoy, having retreated from Achiet-le-Petit on 26 March. At 11:00 a.m. on 28 March, the 41st Division was ordered to man the purple line and a battalion of its 124th Brigade was ordered to recapture Rossignol Wood. The battalion mistakenly attacked eastwards instead of skirting the wood and attacking from the north and was bogged down among German outposts near Nameless Farm.

As night fell, the 4th Australian Brigade of the 4th Australian Division to the south of Bucquoy and the 2/8th Battalion, West Yorkshire Regiment (West Yorks) of the 185th Brigade, ordered up from reserve and attached to the 187th Brigade, were to capture the German-occupied trenches south-east of Gommecourt during the night. The Australians bombed down 500 yd (460 m) of the trenches but the 2/8th West Yorks took until 2:30 a.m. to get ready and only managed to reach the north end of Rossignol Wood. Despite the failure to re-capture the wood a gap between the Australians and the 186th Brigade had been closed and the threat to Gommecourt ended.
