= Daily Telegraph Affair =

1908 German political scandal

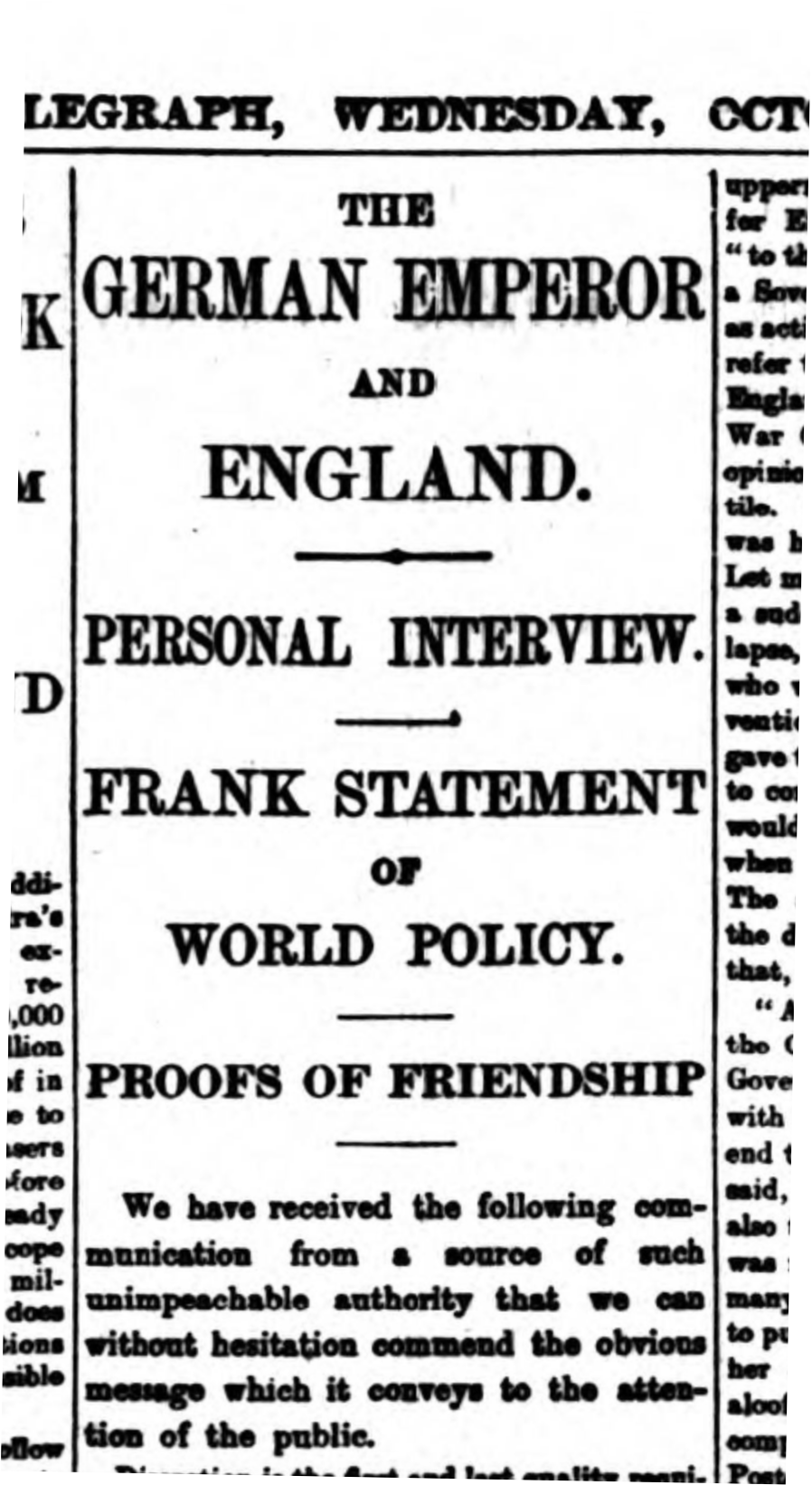
Headline from the original publication

The Daily Telegraph Affair (German: Daily-Telegraph-Affäre) was the scandal that followed the publication by the British newspaper The Daily Telegraph in October 1908 of an article that included a series of impolitic comments by Kaiser Wilhelm II of Germany. He had thought that his remarks would improve German–British relations, but they turned out to be a major diplomatic blunder that worsened relations and badly hurt the Kaiser's reputation. The episode had a considerably greater impact in Germany than in Britain.

The article was based on notes taken by British Colonel Edward Stuart-Wortley during conversations with Wilhelm in 1907. The Daily Telegraph wrote them up in the form of an interview and sent a copy to Wilhelm for his approval. Through a series of missteps made by the German chancellor and the Foreign Office, the interview was published without proper review. It raised ire in both Britain and Germany primarily over three issues: Wilhelm's statement that he was among a minority of Germans friendly to Britain; that he had sent a military plan to Queen Victoria during the Boer War which the British Army had used successfully during its campaign; and that Germany's fleet buildup was directed not against Britain but Japan.

In Germany, the article led to unprecedented criticism of the Kaiser in the press and the Reichstag. Wilhelm fell into a serious bout of depression, stepped back from his attempt at "personal rule" and played little role in German foreign affairs for the rest of his reign. No institutional changes were made that would have restricted the Kaiser's powers to prevent another such scandal in the future.

== Background ==
After German chancellor Otto von Bismarck resigned in March 1890 at the insistence of Kaiser Wilhelm II, the phrase "personal regiment" began to be used to describe the Kaiser's attempt at personal rule. It was generally meant pejoratively: Wilhelm insisted on his divine right, intervened unpredictably in affairs of state and made impromptu speeches that frequently "broke the porcelain of domestic and foreign policy". Under the Constitution of the German Empire, foreign policy lay largely outside the competence of the Reichstag, leaving it at least theoretically open to the Kaiser to exercise his influence. Wilhelm frequently made use of his family connections with European royalty, especially the British, to engage in personal diplomacy in the belief that he had a special gift for it. In 1901 he boasted unrealistically to his uncle, Edward VII, king of the United Kingdom: "I am the sole arbiter and master of German foreign policy, and the government and country must follow me."

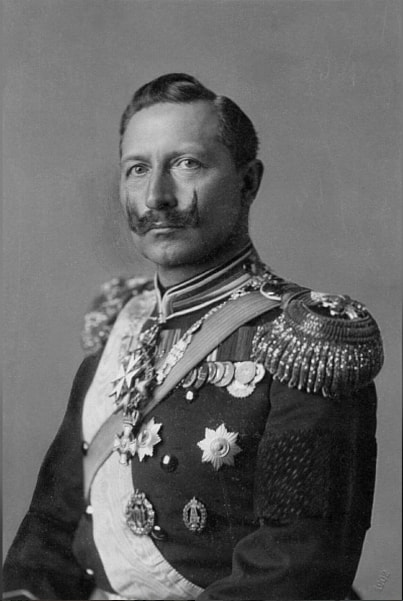
Kaiser Wilhelm II in 1904

In January 1896, Wilhelm committed a particularly notable indiscretion with the telegram he sent to the president of the South African Republic, Paul Kruger, congratulating the Boers for repelling the Jameson Raid and stopping a possible pro-British takeover of the Republic. Great Britain was outraged at the "Kruger telegram" and its intemperate language, although at home Wilhelm's stance reflected the opinions of many middle and upper-middle class Germans, who showed an increased sympathy for the Boers after the raid.

In spite of Wilhelm's numerous false steps, some of the diplomatic failures that were blamed on his intervention had been sanctioned by the German government. The Kaiser's visit to Tangier in 1905, which sparked the First Moroccan Crisis and heightened tensions between France and Germany, was the idea of Chancellor Bernhard von Bülow. Bülow also drafted the 1905 Treaty of Björkö between Germany and the Russian Empire, which was triumphantly signed by Tsar Nicholas II and Kaiser Wilhelm. In the end it was never implemented and only made Russia, France and Britain more wary of Germany. In 1906 Bülow rebuked Wilhelm for interfering in foreign affairs after a resolution was introduced in the Reichstag condemning him on that account. The cumulative effect was that even before 1908, German contemporaries across the political spectrum had come to view Wilhelm's personal interventions in foreign policy as harmful to the nation's reputation.

== Origin ==
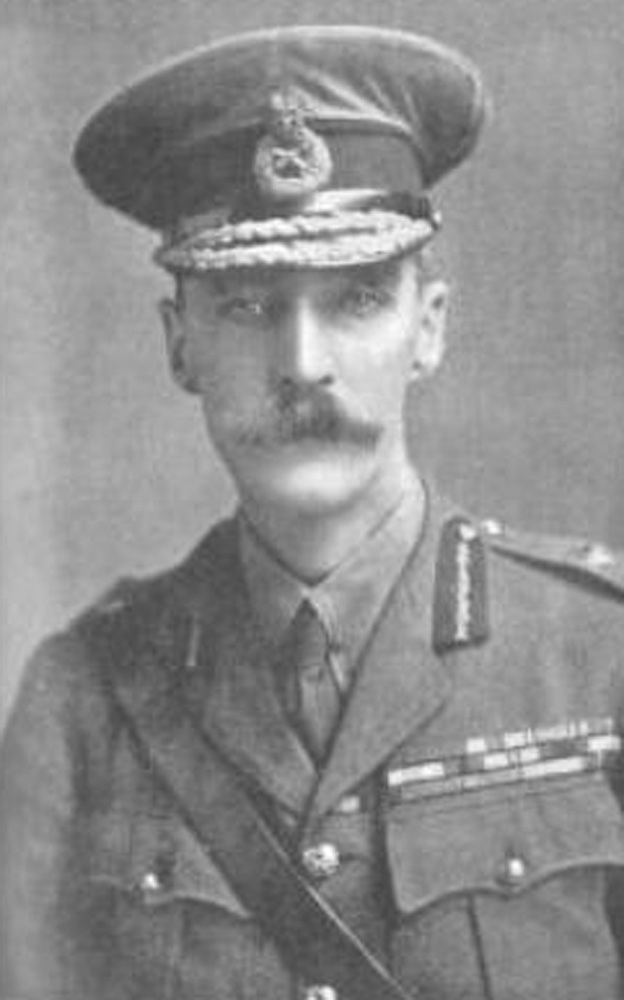
Colonel Edward Stuart-Wortley circa 1900, with whom Wilhelm had the conversations that led to the Daily Telegraph Affair

On a 1907 visit to England, Wilhelm stayed at the home of Colonel Edward Stuart-Wortley. The two men had a number of conversations in which Wilhelm expounded on his desire for friendly relations between Germany and Great Britain. The sympathetic Stuart-Wortley decided that relations between Great Britain and Germany could be improved if the English people knew Wilhelm's true feelings. When Stuart-Wortley and Wilhelm met again in September 1908, they discussed Stuart-Wortley's idea to have London's Daily Telegraph publish the contents of their conversations using the notes he had taken. Wilhelm agreed, and the journalist Harold Spender wrote an article in the form of an interview. The Daily Telegraph sent the draft to Wilhelm in Berlin and asked for approval to publish it.

What happened next with the manuscript, and especially Chancellor Bülow's role in the matter, has been a subject of historical controversy for decades. Recent scholarship has largely disproved Bülow's claim that he never read the draft and had relied on the Foreign Office to make any necessary changes and approve it. Historian John C. G. Röhl calls Bülow's version a "cynical cover-up" to deflect from himself the blame for the publishing of the damaging article. It is all but certain that Bülow did read the draft that Wilhelm forwarded to him and then sent it to the Foreign Office for review. The officials there made a few minor factual corrections and sent it back to Bülow on the assumption that he would make the final decision on publication, since the matter was so highly political. Bülow personally discussed the article with Wilhelm on 12 October.

After talking the next day with Foreign Affairs Secretary Wilhelm von Schoen about various suggested changes, Bülow sent the manuscript to Martin Freiherr von Rücker-Jenisch, a cousin of Bülow's who was liaison with the Foreign Office in the Kaiser's suite. Jenisch sent the draft back to Wilhelm with a letter outlining three places where "exception can be taken to the wording" and noting changes in the margins based on the comments Bülow had made. Those included: "It might be better to tone down somewhat, for an English newspaper, the acknowledgement that the majority of the German people have unfriendly feelings towards England" and that the German reply to the Franco-Russian proposal for an intervention in the Boer War needed to be "amended in accordance with the actual circumstances". Wilhelm signed the cover letter and sent the annotated draft to Stuart-Wortley on 16 October. (The source does not say whether either Stuart-Wortley or The Daily Telegraph made any of the suggested changes to the original draft.)

== Contents and reactions ==
The article, which appeared in The Daily Telegraph on 28 October, caused an uproar in both Great Britain and Germany. In many people's eyes, Wilhelm had outdone himself in his careless indiscretions. Even though he claimed that he had only friendly feelings for England, he had said that "you English are mad, mad, mad as March hares". He went on to explain:

My actions ought to speak for themselves, but you listen not to them but to those who misinterpret and distort them. That is a personal insult which I feel and resent. To be forever misjudged, to have my repeated offers of friendship weighed and scrutinized with jealous, mistrustful eyes, taxes my patience severely. ... The prevailing sentiment among large sections of the middle and lower classes of my own people is not friendly to England. I am, therefore so to speak, in a minority in my own land, but it is a minority of the best elements as it is in England with respect to Germany.

The British press took Wilhelm's "stunning admission" that he was in a minority of Germans friendly to Britain as proof of the need to take a firm stance towards Germany. The Pall Mall Gazette wrote in an article titled "An Unbutterable Parsnip" on 29 October that Wilhelm had shown that “the actions of the German Government have not squared with the friendly words of the German Kaiser”.

As further proof of his and Germany's friendship towards Britain, Wilhelm boasted of how he had helped the country during the Boer War. There was some truth to his statement that he had played a role in keeping France and Russia from intervening against Britain, but then he went on to claim that he had sent Queen Victoria, his grandmother, a detailed military plan and that it was “a matter of curious coincidence that the plan which I formulated ran very much along the same lines as that which was actually adopted by Lord Roberts and carried by him into successful operation”. Across Europe, including in France and Russia, reactions to Wilhelm's Boer War statements were overwhelmingly negative. London's Daily Mail found it to be a "paradox most amazing" that the author of the Kruger telegram was an enemy of the Boers. When the British secretary of state for war, Viscount Haldane, was asked in parliament if Wilhelm's plan was in the British archives, he said "no" and that it would not be worth the effort to look for it. Since Haldane had not stated unequivocally that there was no such plan, only that it wasn't in the archives, the question became a particular embarrassment for Germany, whose government wished to deny such plan entirely. Vorwärts, the newspaper of the Social Democratic Party (SPD), lambasted “the atrocious incompetence” of Germany's foreign policy. The Pan-Germanists were upset as well. The nationalist Rheinisch-Westfälische Zeitung wrote: "The soul of the German nation will be deeply wounded by the knowledge that its Kaiser worked up a war plan with which to annihilate the valiant Boers, a people of a kindred race."

A third subject about which Wilhelm's remarks caused confusion and anger was the Anglo-German naval arms race. In 1898 Germany had begun to expand its fleet of warships with the aim of building a navy that would be two-thirds the size of Great Britain's. Especially after the passage of Germany's 1908 naval bill speeding up the production of new ships, alarm among British the public and in the government rose. That autumn they read in The Daily Telegraph:

But, you will say, what of the German navy? Surely, that is a menace to England? ... My answer is clear. Germany is a young and growing empire. She has a worldwide commerce which is rapidly expanding, and to which the legitimate ambition of patriotic Germans refuses to assign any bounds. Germany must have a powerful fleet to protect that commerce and her manifold interests in even the most distant seas. ... Who can foresee what may take place in the Pacific in the days to come, days not so distant as some believe, but days, at any rate, for which all European Powers with Far Eastern interests ought steadily to prepare? Look at the accomplished rise of Japan; think of the possible national awakening of China; and then judge of the vast problems of the Pacific. Only those Powers which have great navies will be listened to with respect.

Wilhelm's remarks affected the British parliamentary debate in December 1908 on the building of new dreadnoughts. In light of the commonly perceived German threat and an increased level of public concern, the Liberal government, which had promised expensive social reforms including old age pensions, changed course and backed the immediate building of four costly dreadnoughts.

Sir Eyre Crowe, an expert on Germany in the Foreign Office, concluded that the "interview" was part of a German attempt to mislead British opinion about its true motives, while Foreign Secretary Sir Edward Grey wrote privately of Wilhelm: "He is like a battleship with steam up and screws going, but with no rudder, and he will run into something some day and cause a catastrophe."

== Consequences in Germany ==
The publication of the Daily Telegraph article caused an unprecedented wave of criticism of the Kaiser in both the German press and in the Reichstag. It was heightened by the scandal that had broken the year before following accusations that a number of Wilhelm's intimates were homosexual (the Eulenburg affair). There were loud calls for an end to his personal rule and even open discussions, such as the one initiated by the journalist Maximilian Harden, suggesting that Wilhelm abdicate.

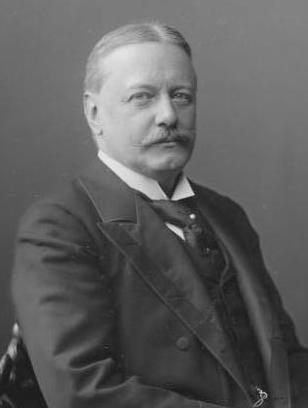
Bernhard von Bülow, who was German chancellor during the Daily Telegraph affair

The Reichstag debated the matter for two days starting on 10 October 1908. It began on the subject of what harm had been done to relations between Germany and Great Britain but quickly turned to Wilhelm's "personal monarchy". Georg von Hertling of the Centre Party, who became the Empire's chancellor before Prince Max of Baden and the German revolution of 1918–1919, said that "the German people must demand that the Reich Chancellor possess the will and the strength to bring the kind of influence to bear on the Kaiser without which his constitutional responsibility loses all meaning". Wolfgang Heine (SPD) said that the Reichstag should oust Chancellor Bülow (who was constitutionally dependent solely on the confidence of the Kaiser). Paul Singer, also of the SPD, went further and demanded constitutional changes. He wanted the power to declare war and make peace vested in the Reichstag rather than the Kaiser and for the Reichstag to participate in the selection of the chancellor.

Criticism of Wilhelm also came from high levels of the military. In the Prussian Ministry of State, General Karl von Einem and Admiral Alfred von Tirpitz said that they were horrified by the Kaiser's words. Einem added that "dissatisfaction with the Kaiser’s conduct and demeanour, the excessive growth of Personal Rule, the Kaiser’s temperamental outbursts and his moods, was becoming more and more widespread, even in the officer corps". He nevertheless told the Kaiser that the army was loyal and could "deal with" the Reichstag if it came to that.

Chancellor Bülow's defence of the Kaiser in the Reichstag was aimed primarily at shifting blame from himself for not stopping the publication of the article, and it led to Wilhelm losing trust in his chancellor. Wilhelm replaced him in July 1909 after he ran into difficulties moving a financial reform package through the Reichstag and handed in his resignation.

Nothing came of the calls from the parliamentary Left to make constitutional changes that would limit the Kaiser's powers. Bülow worked out an agreement with Wilhelm in which he promised to be more restrained and uphold his constitutional responsibilities. A proposal to summon Germany's ruling princes to Berlin for a formal protest was dropped, and the scandal around the Daily Telegraph interview gradually faded from public view.

== Effect on Wilhelm ==
Wilhelm was deeply shaken by the reaction to the Daily Telegraph story. His mood was described as one of profound depression or even a nervous breakdown. He went from bouts of crying to outbursts of fury. General von Einem noted that Wilhelm appeared as if broken and that he never regained his former confidence. One confidant said, “I had the feeling that in William the Second I had before me a man who was looking with astonishment for the first time in his life on the world as it really is.” Rudolf von Valentini, Wilhelm's chief of the Privy Cabinet, described the Kaiser's later mood as one of "tired resignation" and without vitality. For months after the scandal broke he stayed largely out of the public eye, and there were no similar scandals in the remaining years of his reign.

Historian and Wilhelm II biographer John Röhl nevertheless concluded that the scandal had little effect on Wilhelm in the long term:

Instead of recognising his mistakes and drawing lessons for the future from the disaster caused by his quasi-absolutist manner of ruling, Wilhelm II still refused to accept any blame. Although he had no alternative but to restrain himself in his speeches for the time being, in his letters and conversations – above all with foreign sympathisers – he gave vent to extravagant tirades of hatred for those who he considered had ‘betrayed’ him. It was not long before he saw himself as "the greatest martyr of his time". As far as his conduct and the much criticised system of Personal Monarchy were concerned, the Daily Telegraph affair made little difference. ... Among his entourage the feeling of sitting on a powder-keg did not diminish, but increased markedly. "Fundamentally the Kaiser is in fact still the same as before", [Hofmarschall Count von] Zedlitz observed.
