= Archibald Stuart (disambiguation) =

Archibald Stuart was a Virginian lawyer and politician.

Archibald Stuart or Stewart may also refer to:

- Archibald Stewart (trade unionist), Australian trade unionist
- Archibald Stewart (merchant) (died 1584), Provost of Edinburgh
- Archibald Stewart (Lord Provost) (1697–1780) Lord Provost of Edinburgh and MP
- Sir Archibald Stewart, 1st Baronet, of Blackhall, commissioner for Renfrewshire
- Sir Archibald Stewart, 1st Baronet, of Burray, commissioner for Orkney and Shetland (Parliament of Scotland constituency)
- Sir Archibald Stewart, 1st Baronet, of Castlemilk, commissioner for Renfrewshire (Parliament of Scotland constituency)
- Archibald Stewart (American pioneer) from Kyle Ranch
- Archibald Stuart, 13th Earl of Moray, son of Francis Stuart, 10th Earl of Moray
- Archibald Stewart (rugby union) (1890–1974), Scottish rugby union player
- Archie Stewart, American baseball player

== See also ==
- Archibald Stuart-Wortley (disambiguation)
