= Highcliffe Castle =

19th-century castle in Highcliffe, Dorset, England

Coordinates: 50.7380°N 1.7141°W

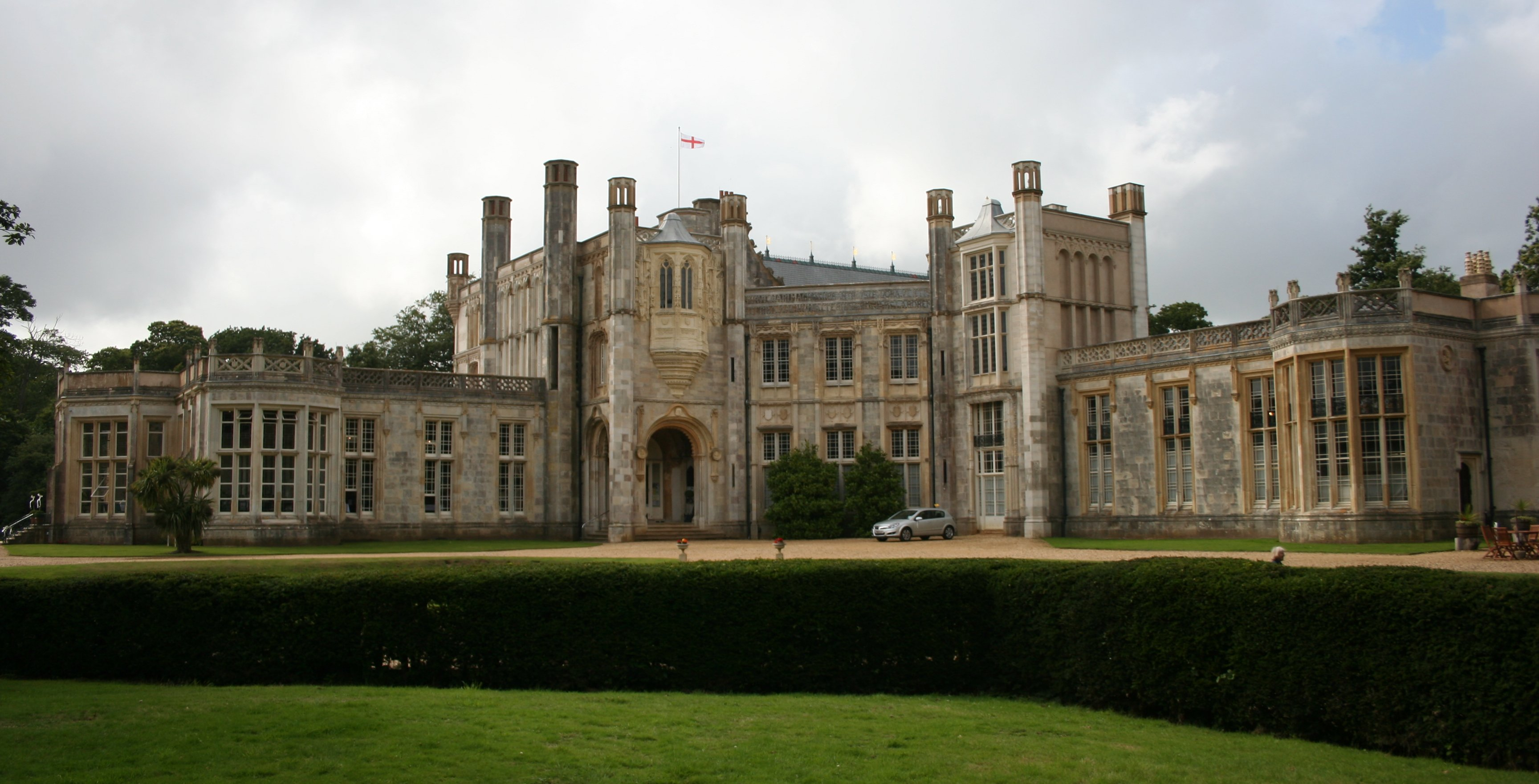

General information
- Architectural style: Georgian Gothic Revival
- Location: Highcliffe, Dorset, England
- Construction started: 1830
- Renovated: 1977 onwards
- Client: Charles Stuart, 1st Baron Stuart de Rothesay
- Owner: Christchurch Council

Design and construction
- Architect: William Donthorne

Renovating team
- Architects: Niall Phillips Architects, Bristol

Listed Building – Grade I
- Official name: Highcliffe Castle
- Designated: 14 October 1953
- Reference no.: 1110077

Highcliffe Castle, situated on the cliffs at Highcliffe, Dorset, was built between 1831 and 1835 by Charles Stuart, 1st Baron Stuart de Rothesay in a Romantic and Picturesque, Gothic Revival style near the site of High Cliff House, a Georgian Mansion designed for the 3rd Earl of Bute (a founder of Kew Gardens) with the gardens laid out by Capability Brown. The design, by William Donthorne, a founder member of RIBA, incorporated large quantities of carved Medieval stonework salvaged from the ruined Benedictine Abbey of St Peter at Jumieges and the Grand' Maison des Andelys, both situated in Normandy, France. A historic Grade I listed building, it is now owned by the Christchurch, Dorset Council.

== Latin inscription on exterior ==
Running along the top of the central part of the exterior between the two towers a partial latin quotation from the Roman poet and philosopher Lucretius can be seen: Suave mari magno turbantibus aequora ventis e terra magnum alterius spectare laborem ("Pleasant it is, when over a great sea the winds trouble the waters, to gaze from shore upon another's great tribulation"). Taken from the opening lines of Book II of De rerum natura, it expresses the joy that should come from recognising one's freedom from the troubles of others.

== History ==
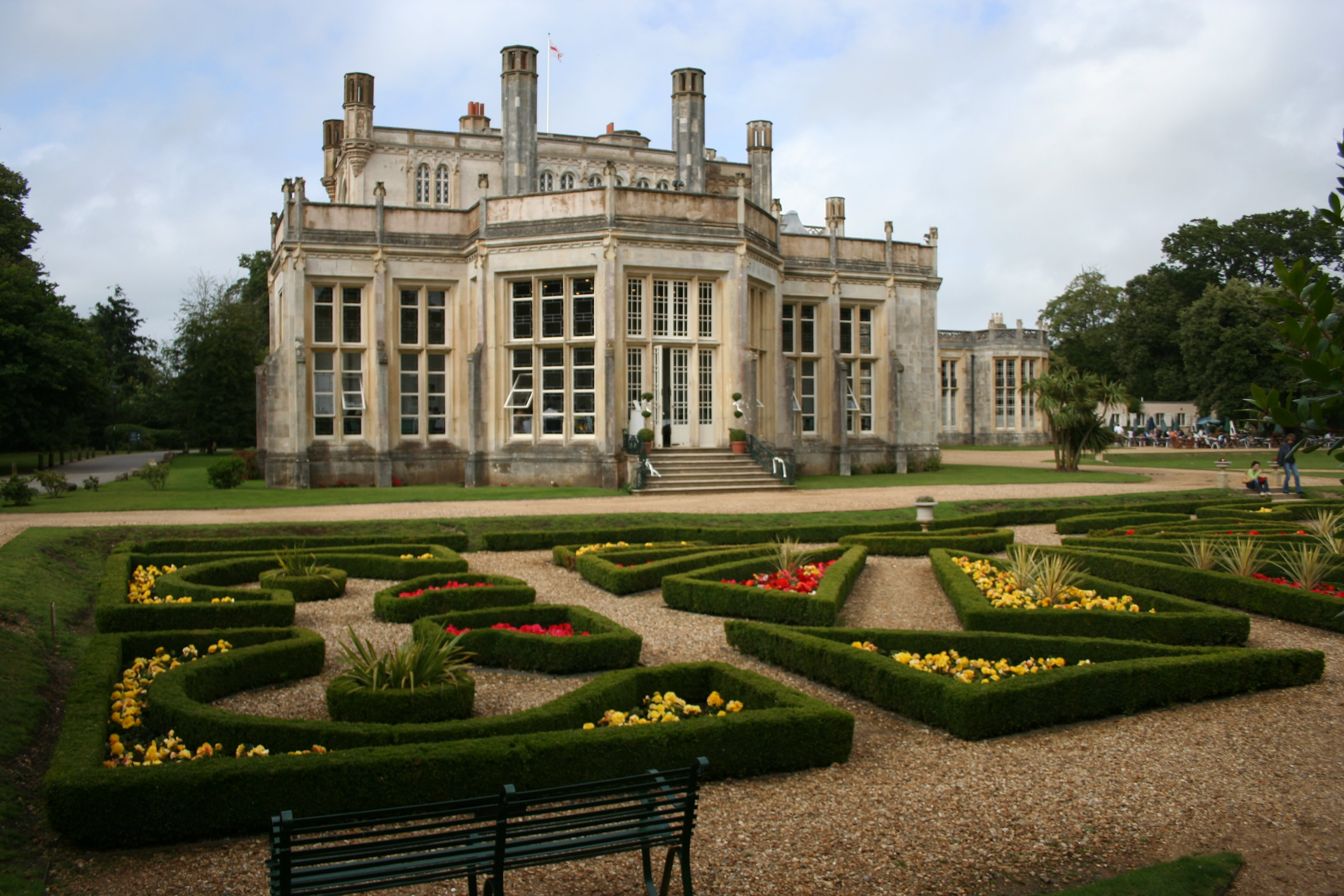
Highcliffe Castle's formal gardens

The 3rd Earl's fourth son, General Sir Charles Stuart sold the estate apart from the nearby smaller Bure Homage House. All that remains of the original High Cliff are the two entrance lodges, now used as a restaurant, also some of the garden walls and features in the lands. The son of Sir Charles Stuart, also Charles Stuart, decided to buy his grandfather's estate and build a new house there.

=== Lord Stuart de Rothesay: 1830–1845 ===
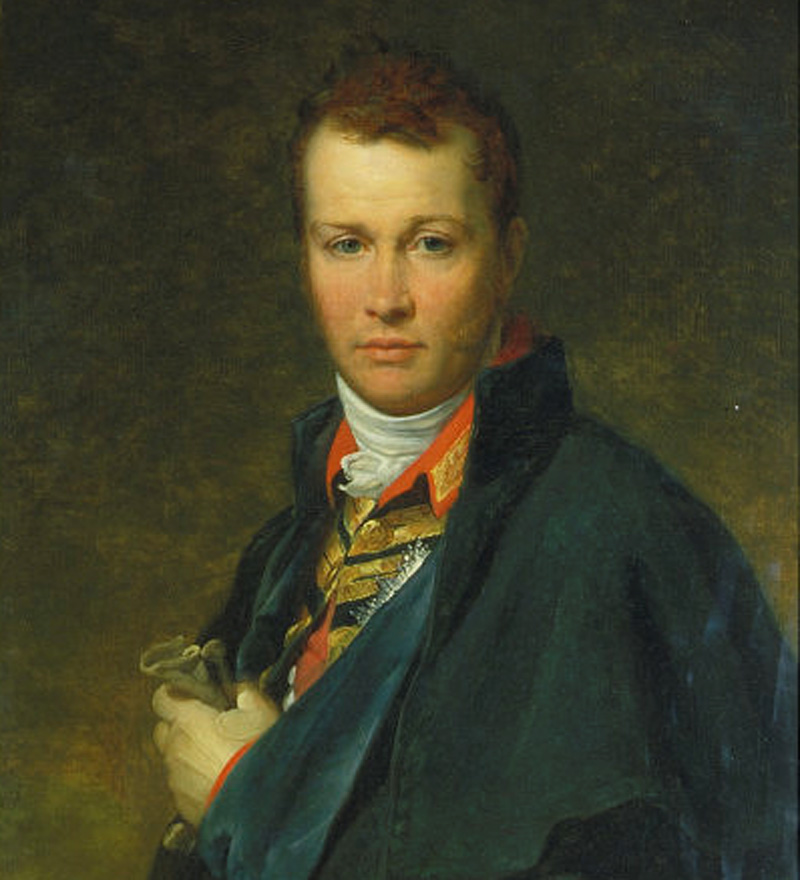
Lord Stuart de Rothesay, 1810

Charles Stuart was born in 1779, the eldest son of General Sir Charles Stuart and Anne Louisa who was the daughter of Lord Vere Bertie.

Educated at Eton college, in 1801 he entered the diplomatic service, serving in Vienna, St Petersburg, French-occupied Spain, and in Portugal. It was as Ambassador in Spain that he became indispensable to the Duke of Wellington, and accompanied him during Napoleon's Hundred Days through to the Battle of Waterloo. After the defeat of Napoleon, Charles escorted the exiled French King Louis XVIII back to Paris and became British Ambassador there. During his ambassadorship in Paris he married the wealthy Lady Elizabeth Yorke, daughter of the 3rd Earl of Hardwicke. They had two daughters Charlotte (later Lady Canning), and Louisa (later Lady Waterford). His greatest achievement was the Treaty of Rio de Janeiro (1825) which enabled Brazil to become independent of Portugal. In 1828 he was made Baron Stuart de Rothesay, and in the same year was appointed for a second term as ambassador to France.

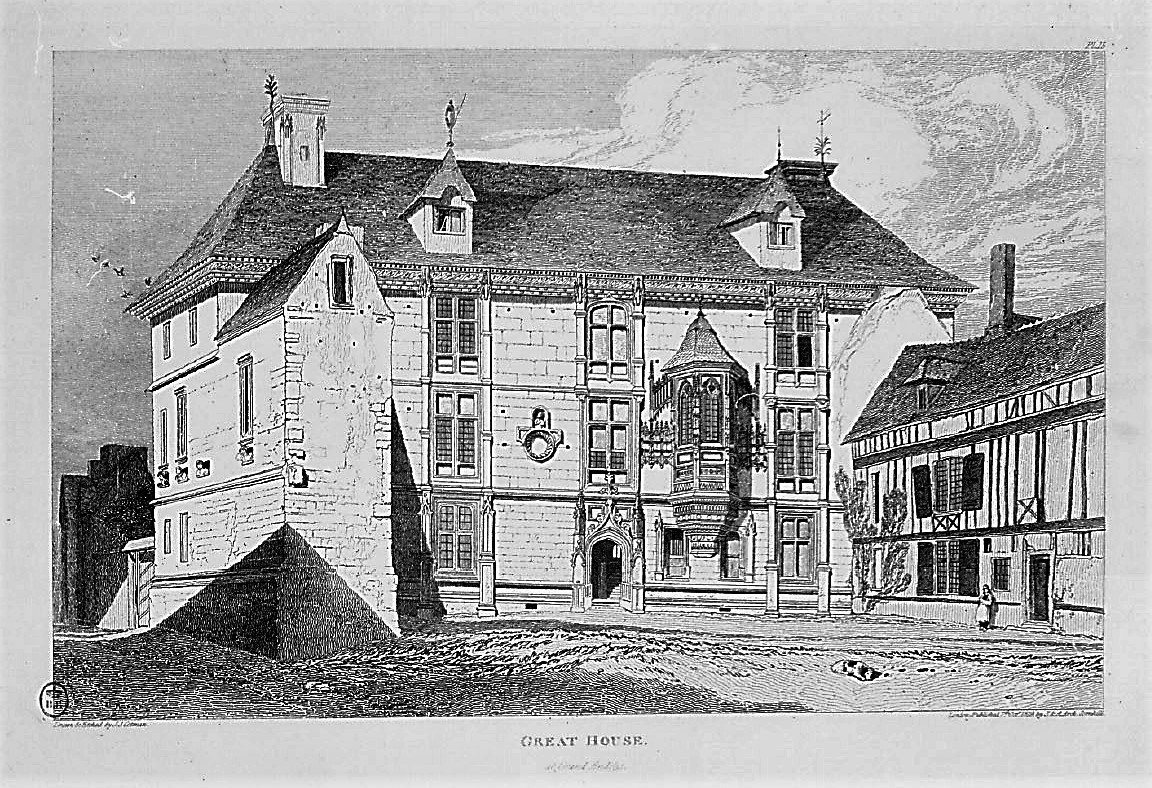
The Grand'Maison at les Andelys, Normandy, by John Sell Cotman

Early retirement from the diplomatic service meant Lord Stuart could start on the project to build a new family home, and by 1830 he had purchased much of the eastern end of the estate, which previously had been owned by his forebears. This allowed him to start construction of the modern Highcliffe Castle. William Donthorn, a founder member of the Royal Institute of British Architects designed Highcliffe Castle. The castle is built on an L-shaped plan, oriented on a south-east axis, so the oriel window is central on the south east elevation, providing a vista across the landscaped gardens to a panorama of The Needles and the Isle of Wight. Used in the building of the house was carved medieval stonework from the Norman Benedictine Abbey of St Peter at Jumieges and from the Grand' Maison of Radeval, at les Andelys. Both of these buildings had fallen into disrepair after the French Revolution. Also included in the castle, were a 16th-century oriel window and a stained glass window.

After the Castle was completed, Charles became Ambassador to Russia in 1841. However ill-health caused his return to England and he died at Highcliffe in 1845. He was buried at St Mark's Church, Highcliffe and his memorial can still be seen there.

=== Louisa, Marchioness of Waterford: 1845–1891 ===
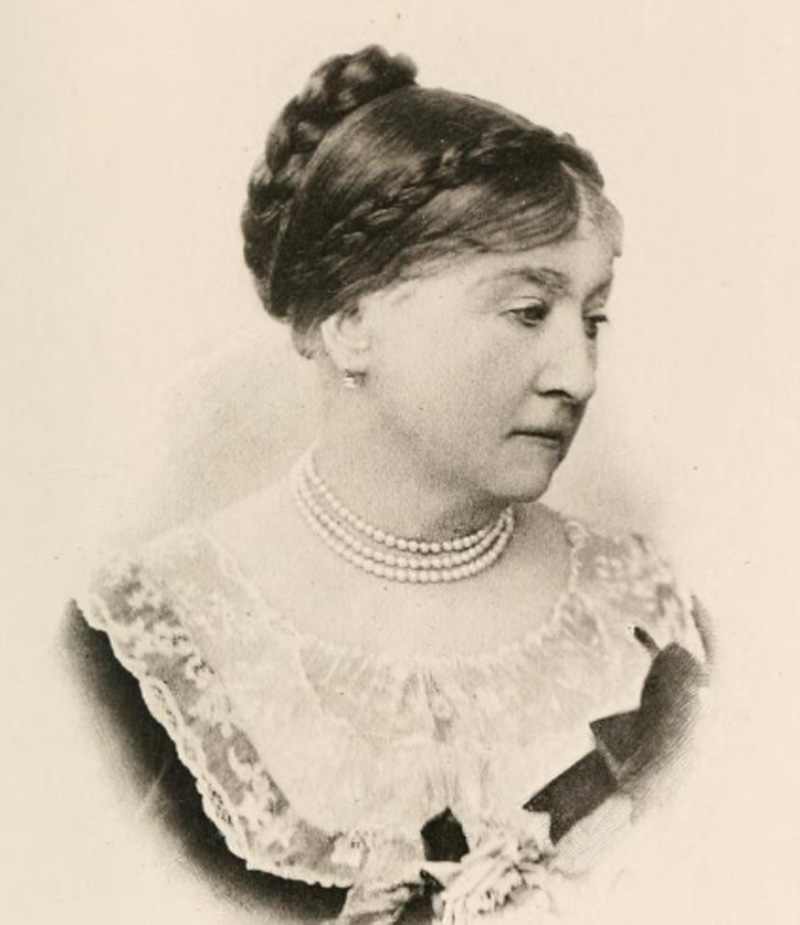
Louisa, Marchioness of Waterford, 1870

After Charles's death, his widow Lady Elizabeth, Stuart de Rothesay inherited the castle. She died in 1867 and left the property to Louisa her younger daughter as Charlotte, the elder daughter, had predeceased her. Louisa had been born in 1818 in Paris. The family moved into Highcliffe Castle in 1834 and lived there and also in their London residence. Louisa wrote some of her memories of her life at Highcliffe Castle which were recorded in a book by Hare.

In 1842 Louisa married Henry Beresford, 3rd Marquess of Waterford and became the Marchioness of Waterford. The couple lived at Curraghmore, County Waterford for many years, and during this time Louisa became an accomplished painter whose work is still valued today. Her husband died in 1859 and she moved to the estate left to her in Northumberland. It was here that she built a school hall and on the walls painted Biblical scenes. These paintings survive today in what is now called Lady Waterford Hall in Ford.

In 1867 her mother died and she inherited Highcliffe Castle. She spent the summers at Highcliffe and returned to Ford Castle in the winter. She had many visitors at the castle one of whom was Augustus Hare, a fellow painter. He recounts a typical day at Highcliffe Castle.

“The late breakfast in the pleasant room which looks across the sunlit sea to the Isle of Wight through the leaves of large magnolia trees was always a happy meeting, at which Lady Waterford brimmed over with the anecdotes and reminiscences evoked by her morning letters. Immediately afterwards she would read aloud from the newspapers in the porch-room, then she went to write in her own room, and her guests dispersed till she summoned them back by playing and singing loudly with wide-open windows. Then all adjourned to the library, where one of the party read aloud, whilst Lady Waterford painted. After luncheon there was a walk, generally on the sands, often to the Haven House and its wild fir wood.".

She entertained the Prince and Princess of Wales (later King Edward VII and Queen Alexandra) at Highcliffe Castle. In 1880 she recounts one of their visits:

"I have had a great surprise in the unexpected visit of the Prince and Princess of Wales, with their two sons and the three little Princesses, landing on the beach, coming up to tea, and drawing nets on the shore till evening — the young Princes swimming about in flannels, and finally the Prince and two sons swimming away to join the steam-tug." A picture of the royal family at around the same time as this visit is shown on the left.

In 1891 Lady Waterford died and as she had no children she left Highcliffe Castle to a very distant cousin Edward Stuart Wortley.

=== Edward Stuart Wortley: 1891–1950 ===
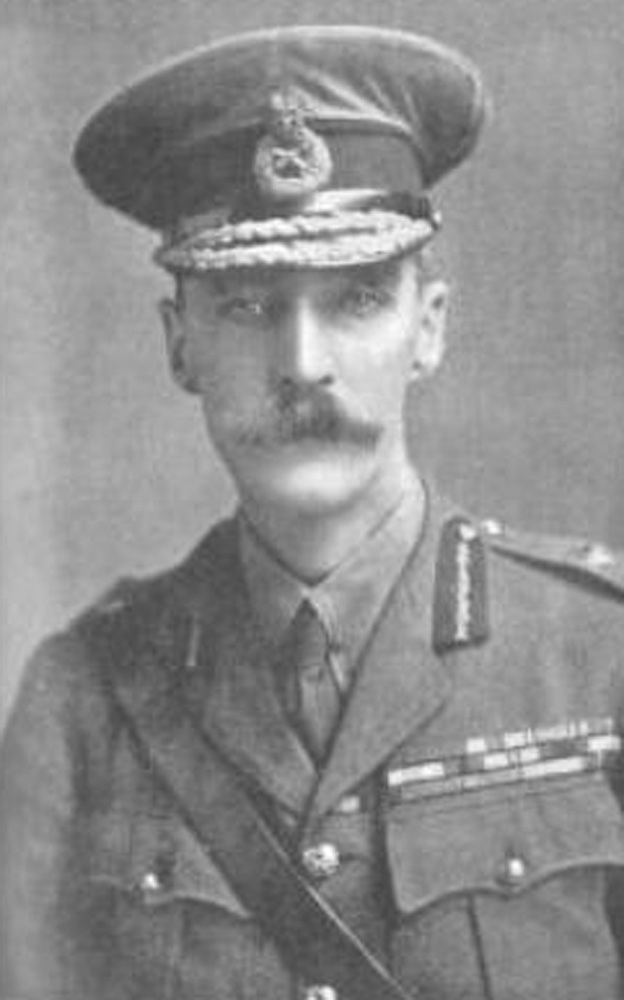
Major General Edward Montagu-Stuart-Wortley

Edward James Stuart Wortley was born in 1857. He was the second son of the Hon Francis Dudley Montagu Stuart Wortley and Maria Elizabeth Martin. He was educated at Eton in 1886 and afterwards joined the Army. In 1877 he entered the King's Royal Rifle Corps. He distinguished himself in the First Boer War in the 1880s and in other African battles until 1900. In 1901 he became Military Attaché in Paris which he held for three years before returning to England.

In November 1907, Kaiser Wilhelm II stayed at Highcliffe Castle for three weeks, officially to recover his health but also to escape the intense political and personal fallout of the unfolding Eulenburg affair. This visit was widely publicised. While he was there, the Kaiser presented two stained glass windows to Stuart Wortley which were inserted in one of the rooms. In the following year he was invited to be guest of honour to the Imperial German Army manoeuvres held in Alsace. He was promoted to major general in 1913. He served in the First World War but his Division did not greatly distinguish itself and he was sent to Ireland to help quell the Easter Rising. He retired from the Army in 1919 and died in 1934.

His wife Violet Stuart Wortley (née Guthrie) was the longest resident of Highcliffe Castle. She was born in 1866 and married Edward in 1891, the same year that he inherited the Castle from Lady Waterford. The couple had three children Nicholas, Louisa and Elizabeth. Unfortunately Nicholas died in 1926 at the age of 34. Violet wrote many books, most notably the history of the Stuart family called “Highcliffe and the Stuarts. Towards the end of her life she wrote an autobiography called Life Without Theory which outlined her early life. She sold Highcliffe Castle in 1949 and died four years later in 1953.

=== Harry Gordon Selfridge: 1916–1922 ===
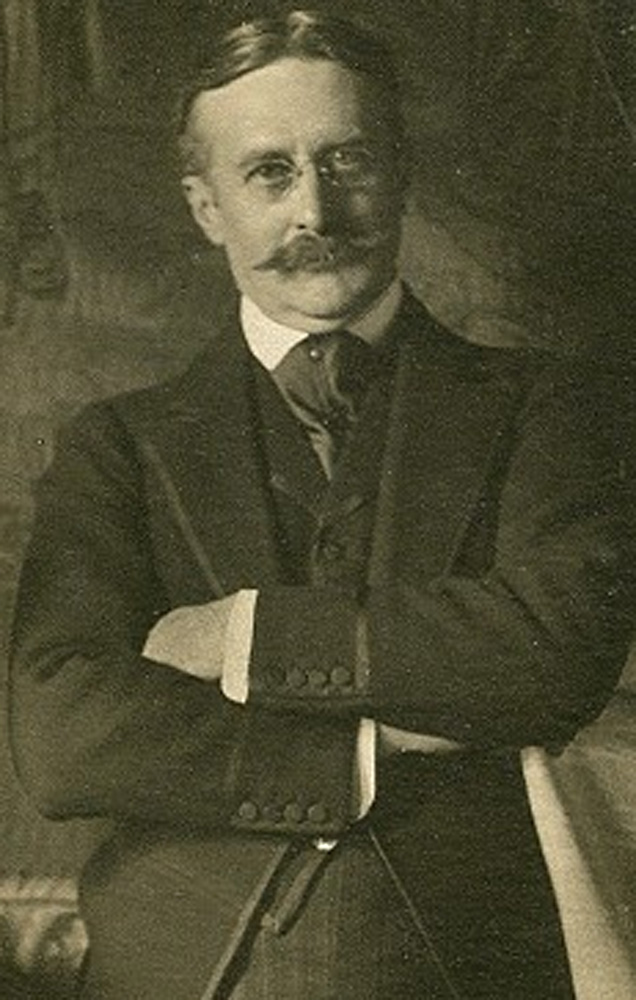
Harry Gordon Selfridge, circa 1900

During the time that the Stuart Wortleys owned the Castle it was rented several times. One of the most notable tenants from 1916 to 1922 was the American-born retail entrepreneur Harry Gordon Selfridge. He lived there with his wife Rosalie, his mother Lois and son Gordon.

At the age of 21, Wisconsin-born Selfridge joined the wholesale retail firm of Marshall Field & Co in Chicago, where he worked for 25 years. He rose to become a junior partner, and amassed a considerable fortune. In 1906 he came to London and opened his own store, Selfridges, in 1909. It was a huge success as he introduced new American ways of marketing.

In 1916 Selfridge leased Highcliffe Castle. Although he was only a tenant he set about fitting modern bathrooms, installing steam central heating and building and equipping a modern kitchen. During the War, Rose joined the Red Cross and opened a tented retreat called the Mrs Gordon Selfridge Convalescent Camp for American Soldiers in the castle grounds. Unfortunately Rose died in the Spanish flu pandemic of 1918 and Harry's mother Lois, who lived with them, died in 1924. Harry did not do well after this and gave up the lease to Highcliffe in 1922 but he is buried in St Marks Churchyard at Highcliffe next to his wife and mother.

=== 1950s onwards: decline ===
Early in 1950 local businessman J.H.Leonard Lloyd bought it from the Stuart Wortley family to turn into a large children's convalescent home. Having already founded and run a successful similar home near Lynton in North Devon, he charged four guineas a week. Unfortunately, later and unfounded media allegations of the indecent assault of children led to a subsequent court case, which although dismissed resulted in the home's closure.

Put on the market for £45,000, it was bought by a developer, who created Rothesay Drive on the estate lands on which he built new private homes. He then sold on the castle and residual gardens for £14,000 to the Roman Catholic Claretian Missionary, who wanted to develop a training centre for student priests. The chapel was in the great hall, flanked by two staircases. A dormitory was built next to the East Wing which now houses the Castle's tearooms. Latterly used as a seminary, with rising maintenance costs the Claretians moved out in 1966.

=== Fires, dereliction ===
Bought for £21,000 in 1967 by three local businessmen, a fire just before this badly damaged the Great Hall, and another fire the following year caused more devastation, the staircase having to be removed. Blocked from any form of development or demolition, resultantly exposed to the weather and vandals, the Castle deteriorated into a ruin. National concern about its fate was voiced by local people, English Heritage, the Ancient Monuments Society, the Victorian Society, the Buildings at Risk Trust, Save Britain's Heritage, as well as prominent architectural historians.

=== Restoration: 1977–1998 ===
After a long series of legal redevelopment disputes with the businessmen, in 1977 Christchurch Council compulsorily purchased the Castle for £65,000 – its valuation set by a Land Tribunal undertaken by the Adjudicator to HM Land Registry – and opened the grounds and beach access to the public to mark the Queen's Silver Jubilee. Unable to afford the projected cost of restoration, in 1986 the Council offered the building on a 125-year lease for it to be restored for residential or hotel use within three acres of land for enabling development, but although several schemes were submitted none materialised.

In August 1979, two episodes of the Southern Television series The Famous Five (entitled "Five Go Down To The Sea") were aired. Several scenes were filmed in and around Highcliffe Castle; whilst in its derelict state, including the hall without staircases and even the rear stepped entrance within a temporary 8 foot wired fence erected at the time, presumably by the council.

In 1989 the Council and English Heritage commissioned Niall Phillips Architects of Bristol to consider the castle's future. In 1990 scaffolding and sheeting was put around it to protect it, and in 1994 a start was made on a phased scheme to repair and conserve the building, funded initially by Christchurch Council and English Heritage. The first phase repaired the Castle's south wing, including the Wintergarden, Drawing Room and Library.

On its completion, the Heritage Lottery Fund agreed to fund the council's £2.6 million bid, enabling all major repairs to be completed by 1998, including the rebuilding of the East Tower which had been demolished in 1974 when it became unsafe. Craftsmen and women from Dorchester-based St Blaise Ltd won a Stone Federation award for their work on the Castle, with the judges describing it as "a textbook example of great care and skill".

== Present day ==
Highcliffe Castle is a Grade I listed building now owned by Christchurch Council, and described as "the most important remaining example of the Romantic and Picturesque style of architecture.” It holds events, is open to the general public throughout the year and can be used for weddings and other private events.

In 2008, Dorset construction company Greendale Construction Limited carried out major refurbishment works as part of the sixth phase of a substantial repair, renovation and development programme for the castle. This was the first significant change made to the building in the last decade. As a result of the restoration work, an estimated 55,000 visitors will now be able to access parts of Highcliffe Castle that were previously not open to the public, including the state dining room, butler's pantry and the East Tower. The project also completed improvements to the Great Hall, food preparation area and bar, as well as constructing new public toilets in the basement and upgrading the external car park.

Following the success of Phase 6, in 2018 Greendale Construction Limited carried out yet another major 18-month renovation and restoration of Highcliffe Castle's Penleaze Wing. This more recent work has opened up parts of the castle previously impassable for over 50 years, since devastating fires and vandalism of the 1970s that destroyed and cut off parts of the building. The works have also seen the extension of upper level stairs with timber and the formation of 2 new lift shafts and 5 new or restored stairs. A mezzanine level walkway has been completed, and new steel stairs extending to the first and second floor.
