= Archibald Stuart-Wortley =

Archibald Stuart-Wortley may refer to:

- Archibald Stuart-Wortley (politician) (1832–1890), MP for Honiton
- Archibald Stuart-Wortley (painter) (1849–1905), British painter

== See also ==
- Archibald Stuart (disambiguation)
