= James Stuart-Wortley =

James Stuart-Wortley may refer to:

- Edward James Montagu-Stuart-Wortley (1857–1934), British general
- James Stuart-Wortley-Mackenzie (1747–1818), politician, known as James Stuart-Wortley from 1795 to 1803
- James Stuart-Wortley, 1st Baron Wharncliffe (1776–1845), British politician, son of the above
- James Stuart-Wortley (Conservative politician) (1805–1881), Solicitor-General, son of the above
- James Stuart-Wortley (New Zealand politician) (1833–1870), nephew of the above
