= Edward Montagu-Stuart-Wortley =

British army officer

Major-General The Honourable Edward Montagu-Stuart-Wortley CB CMG DSO MVO
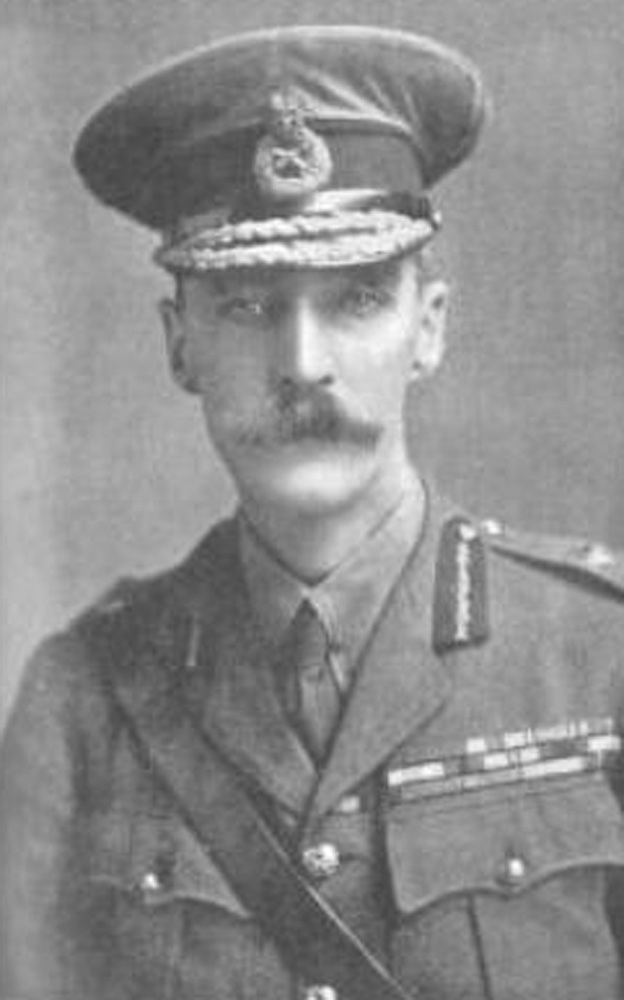
- Born: 31 July 1857; London, England
- Died: 19 March 1934 (aged 76)
- Military career
- Allegiance: United Kingdom
- Branch: British Army
- Service years: 1877–1919
- Rank: Major General
- Nickname: "Eddie"
- Unit: King's Royal Rifle Corps
- Commands: 10th Infantry Brigade; 46th (North Midland) Division
- Conflicts: Second Anglo–Afghan War; First Boer War; Anglo-Egyptian War; Mahdist War; Second Boer War; First World War
- Awards: Companion of the Order of the Bath; Companion of the Order of St Michael and St George; Distinguished Service Order; Member of the Royal Victorian Order

Major-General Edward James Montagu-Stuart-Wortley, CB, CMG, DSO, MVO (31 July 1857 – 19 March 1934) was a senior British Army officer. He saw extensive active service in many parts of world, including Afghanistan, South Africa, Egypt, the Ottoman Empire, Malta, Sudan, France and Ireland. He was the source of the "interview" with Kaiser Wilhelm II that was the basis of the Daily Telegraph Affair that weakened the Kaiser's political power in Germany. During the First World War he commanded the 46th (North Midland) Division and was controversially dismissed from the command of his division after the Battle of the Somme in 1916 due to the failure of his division's diversionary attack.

== Early life ==
Wortley was born in London on 31 July 1857, the second son of Francis Dudley Montagu-Stuart-Wortley, grandson of John Stuart-Wortley-Mackenzie, 2nd Baron Wharncliffe, and nephew of Edward Montagu-Stuart-Wortley-Mackenzie, 1st Earl of Wharncliffe.

He attended Eton College from 1866 and gained a commission in the King's Royal Rifle Corps (60th Foot) on 13 October 1877.

== Imperial wars ==
Montagu-Stuart-Wortley served as Superintendent of Army Signalling for the Kurram Valley Field Force during the Second Anglo–Afghan War (1878–80). After the First Boer War broke out in December 1880, with the Boer Commandos in the Transvaal besieging British garrisons there, the Governor of Natal Sir George Pomeroy Colley raised the Natal Field Force; Montagu-Stuart-Wortley served with the Natal Field Force in the actions at Laing's Nek, Schuinshoogte and Majuba Hill.

In 1881 he acted as a Military Secretary to General Valentine Baker who at that time was in command of the Egyptian police and then, during the Anglo-Egyptian War, was aide-de-camp to Major General Sir Evelyn Wood. In 1884–85 he took part in the Nile Expedition to relieve General Gordon who was besieged in Khartoum and took part in the Abu Klea on 17 January 1885. In 1885 he accompanied Conservative politician Sir Henry Drummond Wolff to Constantinople as a military attaché. Later that year he was appointed as Deputy Assistant Adjutant General to Sir Francis Grenfell as he led his division at the Battle of Ginnis. He was promoted to captain in March 1886 and to the brevet rank of major in the same month.

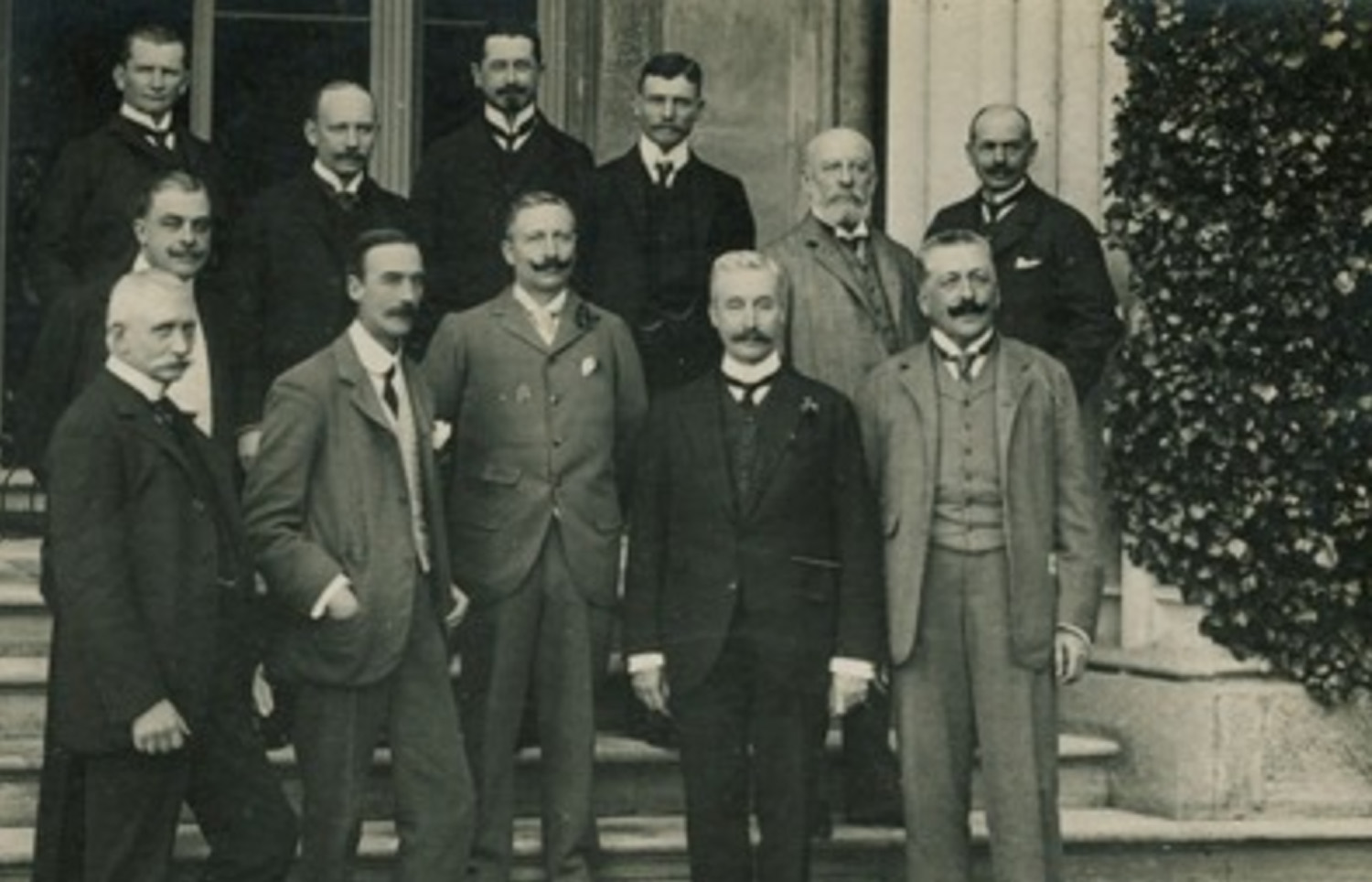
Kaiser Willhelm II at Highcliffe Castle, 1907, Montagu-Stuart-Wortley to his right.

After attending the Staff College, Camberley in 1889 he became a brigade major, serving in Malta from 1893 to 1896. He was seconded for service on the staff on 18 August 1893 and was promoted to the substantive rank of major 4 April 1894, and was appointed a Companion of the Order of St Michael and St George in 1896. Lord Kitchener led a second Nile Campaign from 1896 where Stuart-Wortley was second in command of a gunboat flotilla and later led a band of Arab irregulars who secured the east bank of the Nile in the battle of Omdurman. For his services in this campaign he was awarded the Distinguished Service Order (DSO) in November 1898.

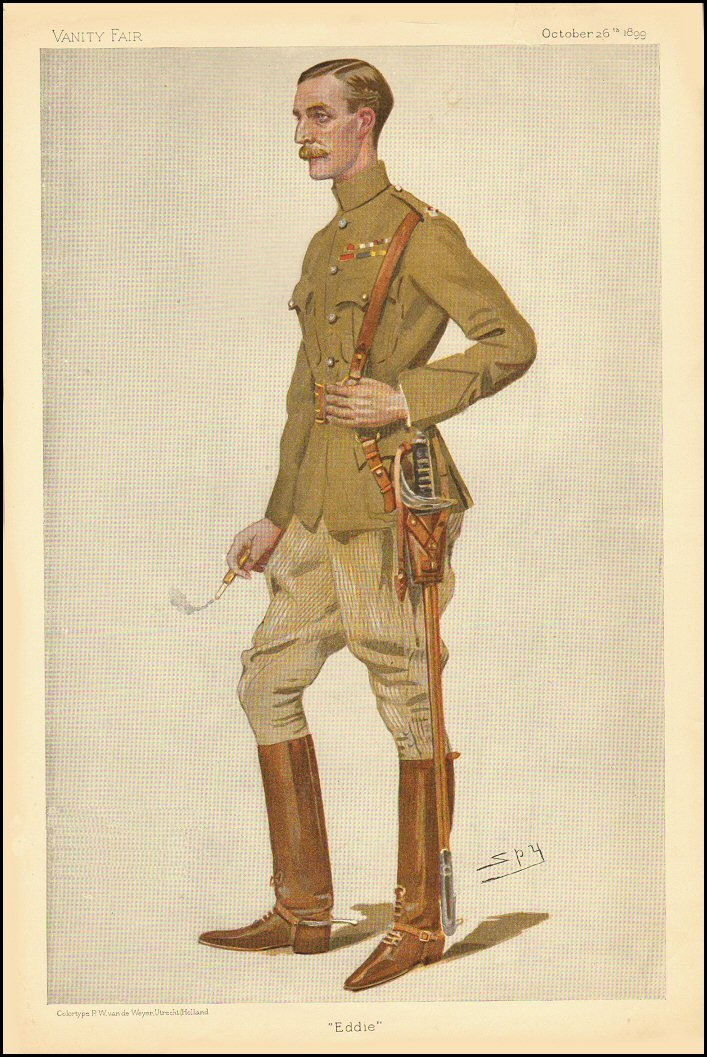
"Eddie". Caricature by Spy published in Vanity Fair in 1899.

During the Second Boer War, Stuart-Wortley, after having served as an assistant adjutant general (AAG) from December 1899 to March 1900, commanded a composite battalion of the KRRC and the Rifle Brigade (The Prince Consort's Own) at the Battle of the Tugela Heights, assisting in the Relief of Ladysmith. In July 1901, he received the promotion to lieutenant colonel, and was appointed a military attaché to Paris, a post he would hold for three years, during which time he was promoted to brevet colonel in March 1904. He then went on a period of half-pay from July 1904. In June 1906 he was made a Companion of the Order of the Bath (CB) in the 1906 Birthday Honours, and was promoted to full colonel in February 1907.

In the summer of 1907 the German Emperor, Kaiser Wilhelm, rented Stuart-Wortley's home Highcliffe Castle whilst he recovered from an acute throat trouble. In return for his hospitality Edward was given two stained glass windows for the castle and invited to visit the German Army's manoeuvres at Alsace the next year. Stuart-Wortley had several conversations with the Kaiser, during which Wilhelm II explained that he desired and had always worked towards, positive relations with Britain. Stuart-Wortley, believing the Kaiser, decided that publicizing these views would counteract the anti-German sentiment in Britain that was rising during the Anglo-German naval arms race. He thus wrote up his notes from his meetings and handed them over to a journalist from The Daily Telegraph in September 1908. Although the transcript had first been submitted to the Kaiser's staff for approval, the text was not properly checked by German officials, and the publication of the notes as an "interview" with the Kaiser resulted in the Daily Telegraph Affair that infuriated the British public and weakened the political power of the Kaiser within Germany.

In April 1908 Stuart-Wortley was removed from the half-pay list, promoted to the temporary rank of brigadier general, and succeeded Colonel Samuel Lomax in command of the 10th Infantry Brigade, which was then based at Shorncliffe Army Camp. After relinquishing command of the brigade he again went on half-pay in April 1912. He was promoted to major general in March 1913.

== First World War ==
=== Early war service ===
On 1 June 1914, shortly before the outbreak of the First World War, Montagu-Stuart-Wortley became GOC of the North Midland Division, a Territorial Force (TF) division, in succession to Major General Hubert Hamilton. In February and March 1915 the division began to embark for the Western Front for service with the British Expeditionary Force (BEF), making it the first complete division of the TF to do so. In May the division was numbered as the 46th Division with its three infantry brigades being numbered accordingly.

In October the division was heavily engaged in the Battle of Loos when it made a costly attack against the Hohenzollern Redoubt and Fosse 8. Stuart-Wortley proposed a bombing attack, but was overruled and ordered to go ahead with a frontal attack by Lieutenant General Richard Haking (his corps commander, then GOC XI Corps). In the event, the attack was a disastrous failure and the division lost 180 officers and 3,583 men killed, wounded or missing. The action was described in the Official History as a "tragic waste of infantry".

Despite his reputation as an excellent trainer of troops, the perceived poor performance and high casualty rates of the 46th Division at the Hohenzollern Redoubt and again at Gommecourt, would result in Stuart-Wortley being made a scapegoat for failure. Woods argues that there is no evidence to suggest Stuart-Wortley lacked competence or failed in his duties at the Hohenzollern attack and that these charges are largely unfair.

Stuart-Wortley had argued for a limited and methodical attack: using the 'bite and hold' tactic which had emerged at Neuve Chapelle. This was especially important because of the limited resources available to him: the number of artillery pieces, artillery planning, counter-battery spotting, the quantity, type and efficiency of shells, the quantity and use of gas and smoke and a uniform issue of effective, standard bombs. To his credit, the twenty-two critical and useful tactical points Stuart-Wortley formed from his analysis of the fighting at Loos suggests he was an open-minded commander keen to learn and develop from past experiences.

Accusations against planners and commanders followed the attack. Lieutenant Colonel Josiah Wedgwood, MP for Staffordshire, wrote directly to Prime Minister H. H. Asquith with a report summarising his discussions with survivors and wounded of the division's 137th (Staffordshire) Infantry Brigade. He argued that a change in general would restore morale and asked why over-confident objectives had been set. Asquith immediately sent the letter to General Sir Douglas Haig, commander of the First Army of the BEF, who rejected most of Wedgwood's findings, laying the blame on the ineffectual fighting quality and lack of courage of the Territorial troops and on Stuart-Wortley, their commander. Haig's evidence came from a gas officer who alleged that when the gas was released "for nearly an hour ... there was no hostile fire in the ground ... Yet the Territorials in question only advanced to our old trench line and held!", and that "the attack was made by officers and NCOs, but few rank and file followed them." Major General Lord Cavan, GOC of the Guards Division, informed Haig: "that the companies of the 46th Division who had been ordered to attack towards the line of the Dump-Quarries did not go forward 40 yards".

Haig concluded that there was a "want of discipline in the 46th Division and general ignorance of war conditions".

Woods argues that Haig's criticism of the 46th Division is unfair and based on doubtful evidence. "The comments from the unnamed gas officer can easily be explained by the hour between the gas being released (1pm) and the commencement of the infantry attack (2pm). The artillery plan directed the intense two-hour barrage toward more rear-ward targets from 1pm, to allow the gas to be directed toward the first line of enemy trenches".

Woods' analysis of the battalion, brigade and divisional war diaries clearly shows that the assault formations left their own trenches and advanced at their allotted time. It wasn't the "want of discipline" that restricted 137th Brigade's advance but the dreadful casualties suffered in their limited advance against unbroken German defences. Woods suggests that both morale and discipline were high in 46th Division. Indeed, the war diaries suggest that many soldiers were forced to retire from positions beyond Cavan's 40 yards.

Despite both Haig and Haking approving divisional plans, Haig reserved particular criticism for Stuart-Wortley. Haig wrote: "I do not think much of Major-General Stuart-Wortley as a Divisional Commander and have already spoken to the GOC XI Corps on the subject". Stuart-Wortley appears to have follow the plans to the best of his limited options. Woods suggests that it may have been that Stuart-Wortley's original idea – of a series of limited, step-by-step attacks – was seen as unambitious, over-cautious and indicative of a man lacking in 'offensive spirit'.

Though Gary Sheffield, in his biography of Haig, is largely supportive of his performance in the First World War, he describes Haig as "ungenerous" and "unfair" in his blame of Stuart-Wortley for the failure at the Hohenzollern Redoubt.

Woods concludes that Stuart-Wortley was likely unaware that he was a pawn in a bigger game of personal politics being played out in the most senior ranks of the British Army, twelve days before Haig succeeded Field Marshal French as commander-in-chief (C-in-C) of the BEF.

Stuart-Wortley incurred Haig's displeasure by writing regularly to King George V about the activities of the 46th Division (despite having the permission of Field Marshal French to do so). This, and the disagreement with Haking about the Hohenzollern Redoubt attack, left Stuart-Wortley as a "marked man" against whom Haig conspired". At the time of the opening of the Somme offensive, he was a few weeks short of his 59th birthday, but in ill-health, suffering from sciatica. Despite his experience, he was "past his fighting best" and his fitness for operational command was questionable. One officer later described him in 1916 as: "a worn-out man, who never visited his front line and was incapable of inspiring any enthusiasm."

=== Gommecourt ===
As part of Lieutenant-General Sir Edmund Allenby's Third Army, the 46th Division was involved in the diversionary attack on the Gommecourt Salient on the first day of the Battle of the Somme, on 1 July 1916.

The initial attack by the division launched from trenches located at the village of Foncquevillers at 7.30 A.M. failed within a half an hour of its commencement with heavy casualties from enemy fire, most of the division's troops seeking cover and becoming entrapped in its own assembly trenches.

Montagu-Stuart-Wortley was ordered to renew the attack at midday as the neighbouring 56th (1/1st London) Division – a fellow TF division – on its right had made good progress but was in need of support as it came under increasing counter-attack from numerically-superior rallying German forces besetting it on three sides simultaneously, another British attack to the immediate south at Serre also having failed. The 46th Divisional infantry force by this time however had become incapable of doing this due a chaotic situation in its own trenches, and was unable to seriously re-engage for the rest of the day. After continual failed attempts to organize a renewed attack by his troops throughout the morning and early afternoon, it was clear to Montagu Stuart-Wortley that there was no prospect of success, but at 3.30 P.M. under pressure from senior command's exhortations he ordered a token effort to be made by two rifle companies of men, only one platoon of 20 men actually going over-the-top on the receipt of the order, with only 2 men of it surviving the attempt unscathed.

In the evening the 56th Division was forced back out of the enemy trenches after 13 hours of continuous heavy fighting within the German position on its own, having sustained very heavy losses, sealing the defeat of the overall operation at Gommecourt. Thus the 46th Division's attack failed completely, and it further had the distinction of suffering the lowest casualties in 2 455 killed, wounded and missing of 13 British divisions engaged that day. It was subsequently judged responsible for the failure of the Gommecourt action in having left its fellow Territorials from London to fight alone in an impossible tactical situation, and was thereafter dogged by a reputation for being a poor quality military formation, a reputation that it would not come out from under the shadow of until its spectacular victory in the crossing of the St. Quentin Canal in 1918.

Reporting on the attack after its failure VII Corps commander, Lieutenant-General Sir Thomas D'Oyly Snow, stated in official correspondence:

the 46th Division ... showed a lack of offensive spirit. I can only attribute this to the fact that its commander, Major-General the Hon. E.J. Montagu Stuart-Wortley, is not of an age, neither has he the constitution, to allow him to be as much among his men in the front lines as is necessary to imbue all ranks with confidence and spirit.

Snow ordered a Court of Inquiry on 4 July 1916 into the actions of the 46th Division during the attack, but before it delivered its findings General Haig as Commander-in-Chief ordered Montagu-Stuart-Wortley to leave the field and return to England.

Given that Montagu-Stuart-Wortley's orders prior to the attack had been "to occupy the ground that is won by the artillery" his dismissal remains a subject of controversy. According to Alan MacDonald, "the Division and its General were made scapegoats for the failure of a fatally flawed concept dreamt up by higher authority – the diversionary attack at Gommecourt".

== Later life ==
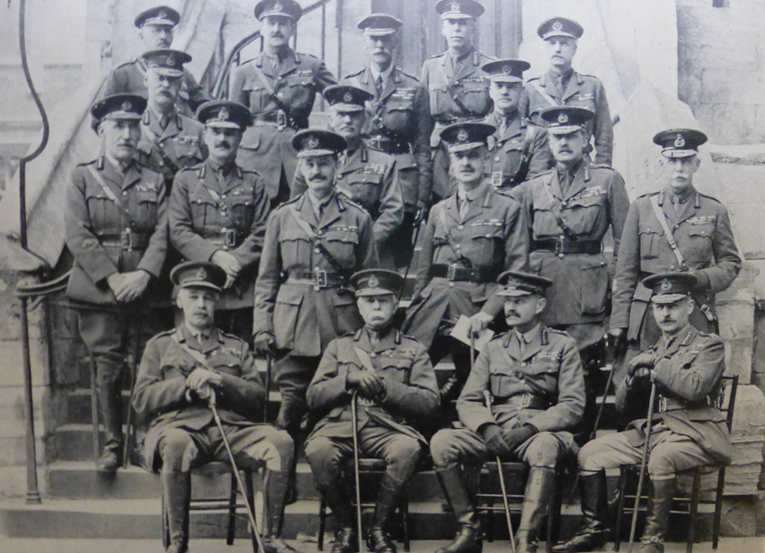
Eighteen Old Etonian generals revisit Eton, May 1919. Major General Montagu-Stuart-Wortley is stood in the centre of the back row.

Upon his return home he was appointed to the backwater command of the 65th (2nd Lowland) Division in Ireland until March 1919. He retired from the British Army on 31 July 1919, and ceased to belong to the reserve of officers in August 1924.

Post-war, Wortley made several protests to the Government about the perceived injustice that he had suffered at its hands, particularly with regard to not having received the customary honours issued to commanders of Divisional rank in the war, but to no avail. He died at the age of 76 on 19 March 1934.

== Personal life ==
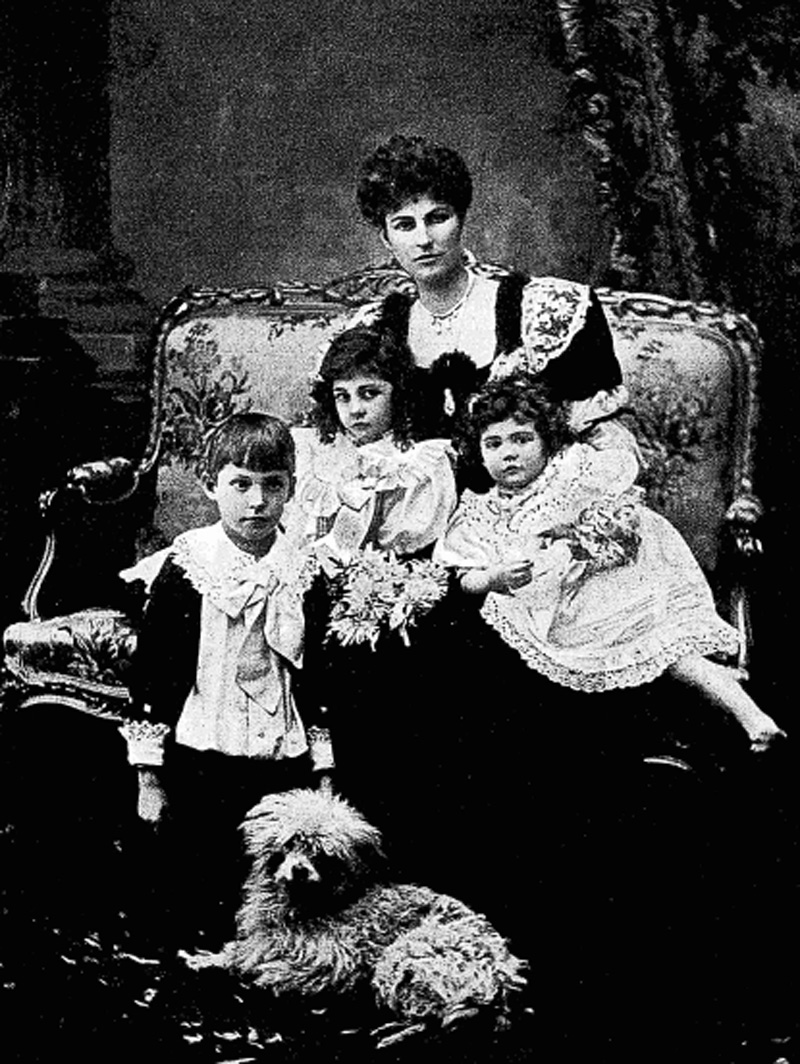
Violet Stuart-Wortley with her children, 1899

Edward married Violet Hunter Guthrie on 5 February 1891; she was the daughter of James Alexander Guthrie, 4th Baron of Craigie and her sister Rose Ellinor Guthrie was married to General the Hon Sir Cecil Edward Bingham. Violet Stuart-Wortley was the author of history books and an autobiography, and was appointed CBE in 1918 for her work as Ladies' Secretary to the Headquarters Committee, Y.M.C.A. They had three children: Major Nicholas Rothesay Stuart-Wortley (1892–1926), Louise Violet Beatrice Montagu-Stuart-Wortley (1893–1970) and Elizabeth Valetta Montagu-Stuart-Wortley (1896–1978).

Edward's older brother, the Hon Sir Francis Montagu-Stuart-Wortley-Mackenzie, succeeded to the Earldom of Wharncliffe and his younger brother, the Hon Sir Alan Richard Montagu-Stuart-Wortley, became a lieutenant general in the British Army serving throughout the First World War.

Stuart-Wortley was granted the precedence of the son of an earl in 1900.

== Bibliography ==
- Franklin, Robert (2003). The Fringes of History: The Life and Times of Edward Stuart Wortley. Natula Publications. ISBN 978-1897887356.

Military offices
| Preceded by Hubert Hamilton | GOC 46th (North Midland) Division; 1914–1916 | Succeeded by William Thwaites |
| Preceded by George Forestier-Walker | GOC 65th (2nd Lowland) Division; 1917–1918 | Post disbanded |
