= Frederick Stuart (British politician) =

British clerk and politician

The Honourable Frederick Stuart
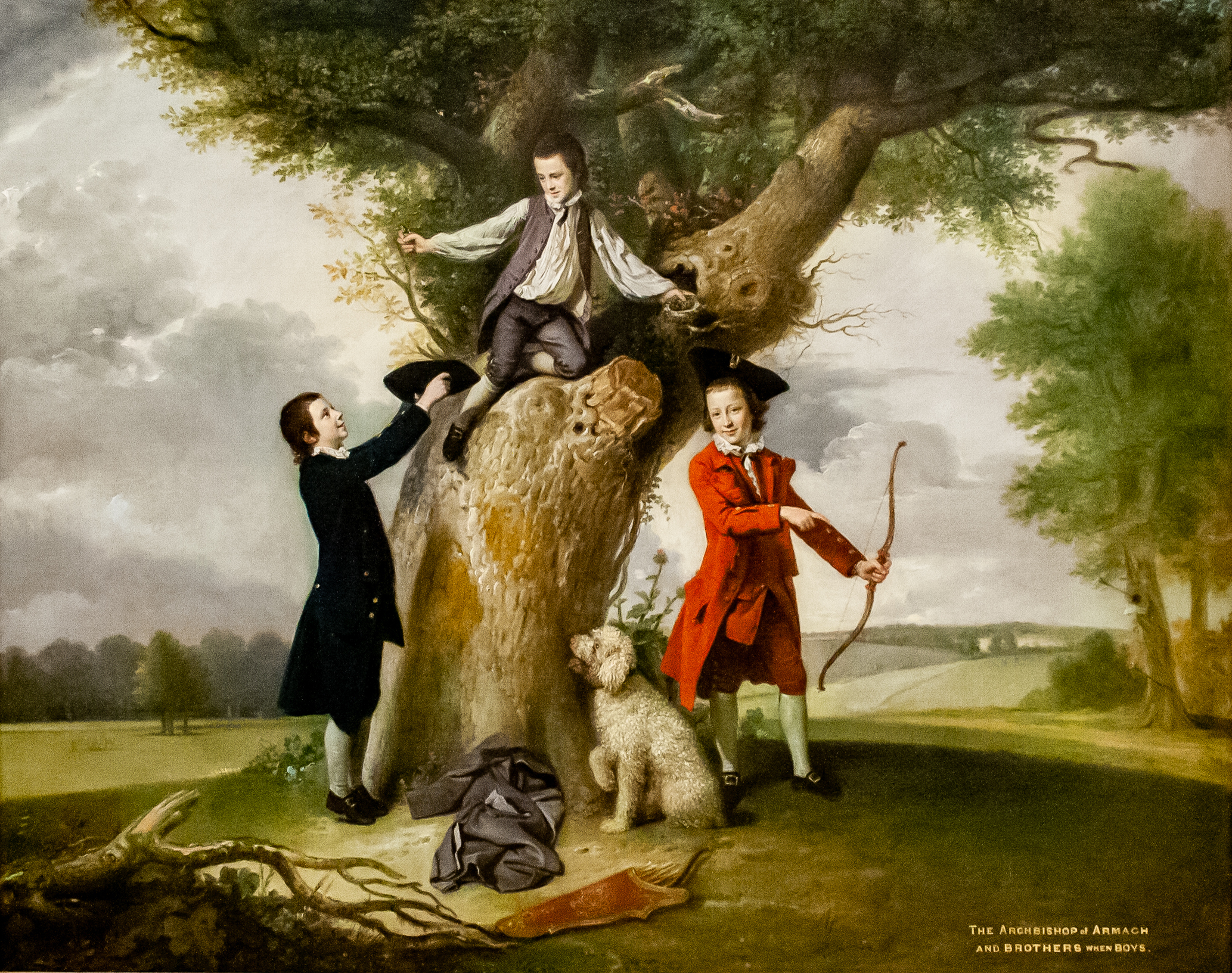
- The Three Sons of the Earl of Bute (c. 1764). Stuart is on the right

Personal details
- Born: 24 September 1751
- Died: 17 May 1802 (aged 50) London, United Kingdom
- Parent(s): John Stuart, 3rd Earl of Bute and Mary Wortley Montagu
- Occupation: East India Company employee; politician

Frederick Stuart (24 September 1751 – 17 May 1802) was a British clerk and politician. He was born on 24 September 1751, the third son of John Stuart, 3rd Earl of Bute, and his wife Mary Wortley Montagu. Lord Bute was to become Prime Minister of Great Britain (1762–63) under George III. Frederick's siblings included: John, a politician; James and Charles, soldiers and politicians; William, an Anglican bishop; and Louisa, a writer. He studied at Winchester College and Christ Church, Oxford, before running away briefly to Paris. Described as the "black sheep of the family", his father obtained a writership for him at the East India Company in 1769, which was unusual for a family with such as position in society. He worked in Bengal and befriended Warren Hastings, who gave him a mission to the Nawab of Arcot.

After returning from India in 1775, Stuart entered parliament, representing the family interest of Ayr Burghs following a by-election in 1776. No seat was found for him in 1780; indebted, he fled to Paris in 1782. His brother, John, 1st Marquess of Bute, provided refuge and returned him to parliament in 1796 to represent the family interest of Buteshire. There is no evidence of parliamentary activity and he died, unmarried, on 17 May 1802 in London.

Parliament of Great Britain
Preceded by Sir George Macartney	Member of Parliament for Ayr Burghs; 1776–1780	Succeeded by Archibald Edmonstone
Preceded by James Stuart as representative until 1790	Member of Parliament for Buteshire; 1796–1800	Parliament dissolved
Parliament of the United Kingdom
New parliament	Member of Parliament for Buteshire; 1801–1802	Succeeded by James Stuart-Wortley-Mackenzie as representative from 1806
