= Lady Louisa Stuart =

Scottish writer (1757–1851)

Louisa Stuart
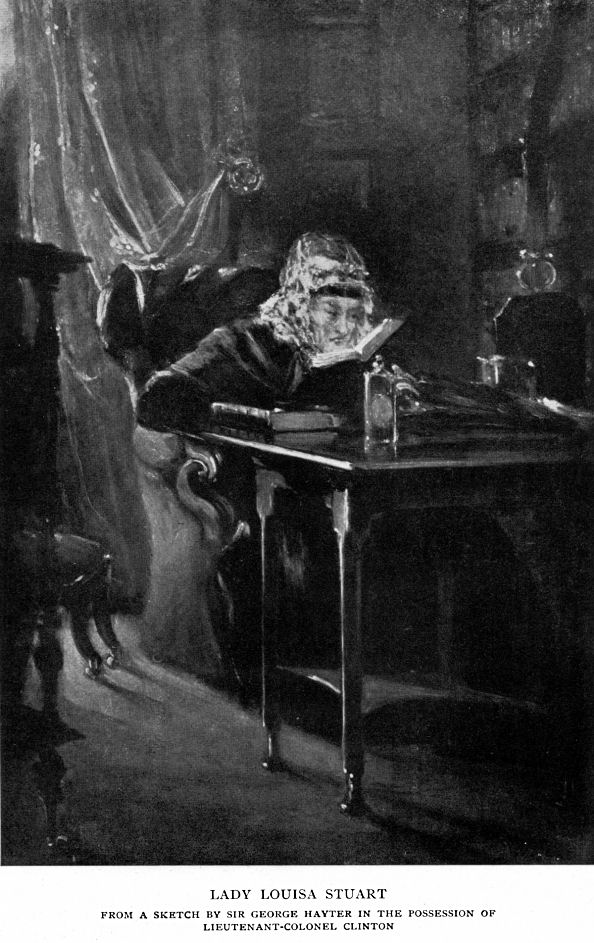
- Portrait c. 1851
- Born: 12 August 1757
- Died: 4 August 1851 (aged 93)
- Parent(s): John Stuart, 3rd Earl of Bute; Mary Montagu

Lady Louisa Stuart (12 August 1757 – 4 August 1851) was a Scottish writer of the 18th and 19th centuries. She was a daughter of the politician John Stuart, 3rd Earl of Bute.

Most of her memoirs and her letters were published posthumously. Her memoir of Lady Mary Coke also covered the political career of Lady Mary's husband Edward Wortley Montagu, and the political rivalries between the Whigs and Tories. Stuart was herself a loyal Tory, and her political views were consistently conservative. She also wrote poetry, fables, and a ballad about a family of human cannibals. Her writings tend to contain malicious humour.

== Early life ==
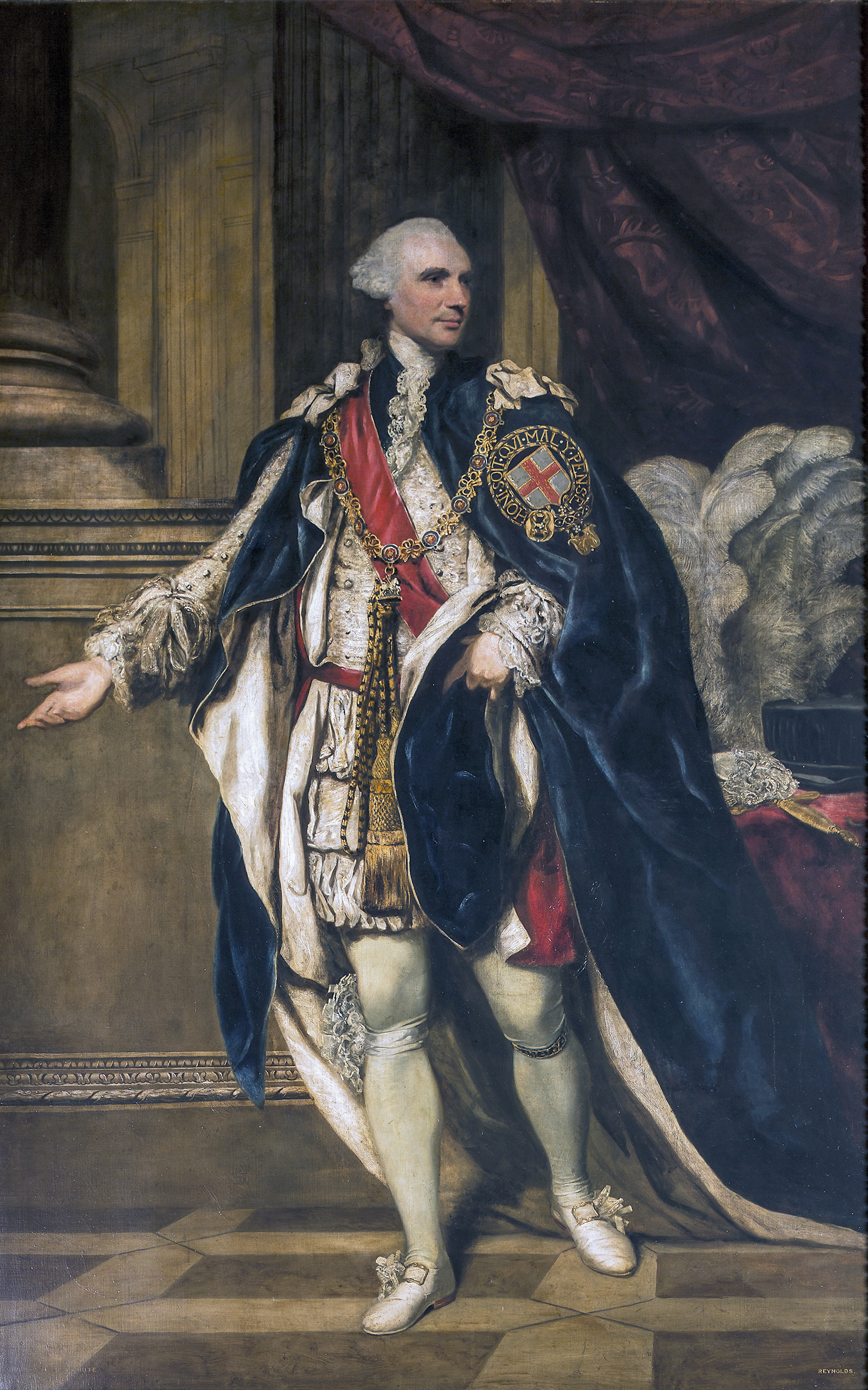
Portrait of the Earl of Bute by Joshua Reynolds, 1773. Stuart's father, the Earl of Bute

Stuart was one of the six daughters of John Stuart, 3rd Earl of Bute, who at the time of her birth in 1757 was the closest friend of the future King George III. Her mother was Mary Stuart, Countess of Bute. Lord and Lady Bute also had five sons. Although Bute was Scottish, he spent much of his time at his grand London house in Berkeley Square. In 1762, he bought the estate of Luton Hoo in Bedfordshire.

George III came to the throne in 1760, and in 1762 his friend Bute became prime minister. As a statesman, Bute was massively unpopular with the English, for a variety of reasons. He was a Scot, a Royal favourite, and a handsome man who was lampooned for his vanity, and was constantly the butt of biting political satire, scandal, and gossip. This included frequent allegations of an affair with Princess Augusta of Saxe-Gotha, the widow of Frederick, Prince of Wales. Bute's ministry fell in 1763, when his daughter Louisa was five years old, and Bute retired from public life to Luton Hoo and thereafter devoted himself to botany, horticulture and other country pursuits.

Stuart's mother, the Countess of Bute, was herself the daughter of the writer and traveller Lady Mary Wortley Montagu.

By the time she was ten, Stuart had begun to follow in the footsteps of her writer grandmother. She had begun a French novel and had also started planning a Roman play. She felt threatened by her brothers, who teased her about her learning.

With her mother, the young Lady Louisa Stuart attended the balls, routs and soirées of London society, but she also followed the literature of the day and corresponded with friends. She had great powers of observation from an early age, and a manuscript notebook survives in which she describes her circle.

Fanny Burney often met Lady Bute and her daughter Lady Louisa and described Lady Bute as "forbidding to strangers", but entertaining and lively among friends. Burney writes of mother and daughter on one occasion:

... both in such high spirits themselves that they kept up all the conversation between them, with a vivacity, an acuteness, an archness, and an observation on men and manners so clear and sagacious.

On another occasion, in 1786, Burney found both Stuart and her mother at the house of Mary Delany after a return from the spa town of Bath and writes that they were:

... full fraught with anecdote and character, which they dealt out to their hearers with so much point and humour that we attended to them like a gratified audience of a public place.

== Brothers and sisters ==
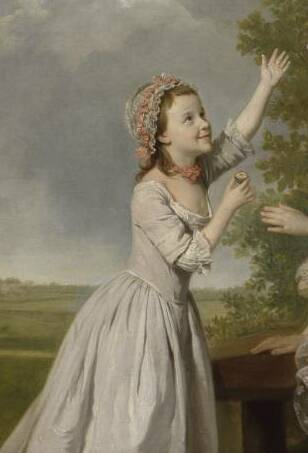
Louisa Stuart as a child from Three Daughters of John, 3rd Earl of Bute (1763–64) by Johann Zoffany

Louisa's brothers included John Stuart, 1st Marquess of Bute, a Tory Member of Parliament from 1766 to 1776, later a Privy Councillor and a Fellow of the Royal Society; The Hon. Sir Charles Stuart, a soldier who saw active service in the American Revolutionary War and the Napoleonic Wars and rose to the rank of lieutenant-general; The Most Rev. and Hon. William Stuart, a clergyman who became Archbishop of Armagh, and James Archibald Stuart, another soldier who raised the 92nd Regiment of Foot in 1779.

Her sisters were Lady Mary Stuart (c. 1741 – 1824), who married James Lowther, later the 1st Earl of Lonsdale; Lady Anne Stuart (born c. 1745), who married Lord Warkworth, later the 2nd Duke of Northumberland; Lady Jane Stuart (c. 1748 – 1828), who married George Macartney, later the first Earl Macartney; and Lady Caroline Stuart (before 1763–1813), who married The Hon. John Dawson, later first Earl of Portarlington.

== Disappointment in love ==
William Medows

In 1770, at the age of thirteen, Lady Louisa fell in love with her second cousin, William Medows, the son of Philip Medows of Nottinghamshire, Deputy Ranger of Richmond Park, and of Lady Frances Pierrepont, who like Louisa's mother was a granddaughter of Evelyn Pierrepont, 1st Duke of Kingston-upon-Hull. Medows was then a thirty-one-year-old lieutenant-colonel of the 5th Regiment of Foot, and Lord Bute considered him unsuitable and put a stop to it. Lady Louisa was bitterly disappointed with her father's decision, writing glowingly of her cousin:

He seems to have that independent spirit which fortune cannot depress or exalt. He is really a character unlike anything but himself, au reste, the most agreeable man I ever met with, and one of the most humorous.

Later the same year, Medows married another lady, Frances Augusta Hammerton, and went on to become a Lieutenant-General, a Knight of the Bath, and Governor-General of Madras.

Stuart was not a beautiful woman. Fanny Burney wrote of her in 1786:

Lady Louisa Stuart has parts equal to those of her mother, with a deportment and appearance infinitely more pleasing: yet she is far from handsome, but proves how well beauty may be occasionally missed when understanding and vivacity unite to fill up her place.

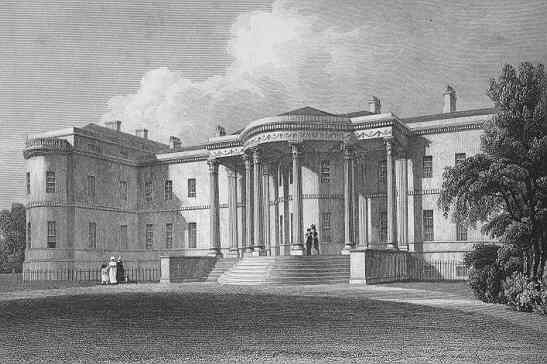
Lady Louisa Stuart's family home at Luton Hoo in Bedfordshire, as it was in her day

Louisa Stuart does not seem to have fallen in love again, but she had at least two other pursuers. Her next was Henry Dundas, member of parliament for Midlothian and Lord Advocate of Scotland, later created Viscount Melville. Dundas was a gallant and good-looking man who had been married but was legally separated from his wife. His devotion worried the Bute family, but it turned out to be brief and merely amused Lady Louisa. Her last serious suitor was John Charles Villiers (1757–1838). He was the second son of Thomas Villiers, 1st Earl of Clarendon, and for a time overwhelmed Stuart with his admiration. Her parents encouraged the match, and she was tempted, but she finally decided that a "love match without any love is but a bad business". As a result, she never married. In 1791, Villiers married his cousin Maria Eleanor Forbes, a daughter of Admiral John Forbes, and in old age he inherited the family's titles and estates from his older brother Thomas Villiers, 2nd Earl of Clarendon, who never married.

When the Earl of Strafford was widowed in 1785, society gossip quickly linked his name with Stuart's, leading Lady Diana Beauclerk to remark "So Lady Louisa Stuart is going to marry her great-grandfather, is she?" However, Stuart looked on Strafford merely as an elderly uncle, and not as a suitor, and he for his part did nothing to promote such an alliance.

Stuart later became a close friend of the novelist and poet Sir Walter Scott, a friendship that lasted from the 1790s until Scott's death in 1832. Scott regularly sent Stuart his work for her opinion, describing her as the best critic of his acquaintance.

== Work ==
For fear of losing caste as a lady of quality, Stuart had no wish to see anything she had written published under her name, and it was not until 1895, more than forty years after her death, that this happened. Lockhart's Life of Scott (1837–1838) had contained several of Sir Walter Scott's letters to Stuart. In a letter to his publisher Robert Cadell, Scott writes "I trust you have received the printed sheets of Lady Louisa Stuart, but for your life mention [not] her name."

Much of Stuart's writing is still in the form of unpublished memoirs and letters, mostly addressed to women, but interest in her as an observer of her times began to increase towards the end of the nineteenth century. Between 1895 and 1898, Mrs Godfrey Clark edited and published three volumes of Stuart's work called Gleanings from an Old Portfolio (Correspondence of Lady Louisa Stuart), and the Hon. James A. Home followed these with Lady Louisa Stuart: Selections from her Manuscripts (New York & London: Harper Brothers, 1899) and with two volumes of Letters of Lady Louisa Stuart to Miss Louisa Clinton, published in Edinburgh in 1901 and 1903.

Stuart's memoir of Lady Mary Coke, written in 1827, represents Coke as a virtuous woman suffering from a brutal husband, but also as a tragedy queen subject to paranoia. Her essay Biographical Anecdotes of Lady M. W. Montagu (published anonymously as an introduction to the 1837 edition of Lady Mary Wortley Montagu's Letters and Works) focusses largely on the work and political position of Lady Mary's husband Edward Wortley Montagu, giving Stuart the chance to air her own views on Wortley Montagu, Walpole, Harley, Halifax, and the Whigs and Tories generally, demonstrating her own loyalty to the side of the Tories. Devoney Looser considers that Stuart (whom she calls "the socially correct octogenarian") was troubled by her grandmother's focus on sexual intrigues and says that Stuart did not see Lady Mary's Account of the Court of George I at his Accession as history.

Conscious of Walter Scott's, Alexander Pope's and Samuel Johnson's poetry, Stuart wrote verses of her own, including fables and a ballad about cannibal brothers and what happens to an unfortunate woman who has married for money.

Stuart was not a Bluestocking, and although her writing has a dash of malicious humour, it lacks their mutual admiration. She had a great lady's fine scorn for Elizabeth Montagu's habit of welcoming into society those born outside its pale, and she ridiculed "college geniuses with nothing but a book in their pockets". She wrote "The only blue stocking meetings which I myself ever attended were those at Mrs Walsingham's and Mrs Montagu's. To frequent the latter, however, was to drink at the fountain-head".

Jill Rubenstein describes Stuart as "Tory to the bone, never having forgiven the pain inflicted on her father by the scurrilous personal attacks of Wilkes and others" and compares her politics to those of Sir Walter Scott, "a principled and consistent conservatism".

Professor Karl Miller, in the Oxford Dictionary of National Biography, praises Stuart's "magnificent pieces of writing". He also reports on her inconsistencies. On the matter of the emancipation of women, she was both for and against it, and while she favoured the old order in politics and had an aversion to the mob, she also admired "unadorned human worth". Miller calls Stuart "the least-known, but by no means the least, of the good writers of her long lifetime".

== Later life ==
In her later years, Stuart took a house in London at 108, Gloucester Place, Marylebone, and from there she walked in Regent's Park. At home, she would sit with her books, and although something of a recluse, on occasion she was also highly sociable. She destroyed many of her manuscripts, but continued to write letters and to talk and to visit great houses. A few months before her death, she was sketched by Sir George Hayter, and died at home in London on 4 August 1851.

== Obituary ==
A paragraph on Stuart's death appeared in the Obituary pages of The Gentleman's Magazine for September 1851:

Aug. 4. At Gloucester-pl., aged 94, Lady Louisa Stuart, youngest daughter of John Earl of Bute K.G., the prime minister, and the grand-daughter of Lady Mary Wortley Montague. To this lady we owe the charming Introductory Anecdotes prefixed to the late Lord Wharncliffe's edition of Lady Mary's Works. Lady Louisa remembered to have seen her grandmother, Lady Mary, when at old Wortley's death that celebrated woman returned to London after her long and still unexplained exile from England. Lady Louisa herself was a charming letter writer, and her correspondence with Sir Walter Scott – which we hope to see published in our own time – will, it is said, fully sustain the Wortley reputation for wit and beauty of style, while it will exhibit a poet in a very different character from that in which another poet figures in his celebrated correspondence with her grandmother, Lady Mary. Some of Scott's letters to Lady Louisa are included in Mr Lockhart's Life of Sir Walter. – Athenaeum

By mistake, a shorter version of this notice appeared again in The Gentleman's Magazine Obituary pages for December 1851, preceded by the date "Oct. 4.". Much the same obituary appeared in the annual The Musical World for 1851, but by then Stuart's age had been corrected to "aged nearly ninety-four". The quarterly The Eclectic Magazine for September to December 1851 had the same correction and reported Stuart's death together with that of Harriet Lee under the heading DEATH OF LITERARY LADIES. The Annual Register for 1851 carried a shorter version of the obituary, repeating the mistake of listing Stuart's death as on 4 October.

== Bibliography ==
=== By Stuart ===
- Biographical Anecdotes [by Lady Louisa Stuart, published anonymously] is one of three introductions to the 1837 edition of Lady Mary Wortley Montagu's Letters and Works
- Gleanings from an Old Portfolio (Correspondence of Lady Louisa Stuart), ed. Mrs Godfrey Clark (3 volumes, privately printed, 1895–1898)
- Lady Louisa Stuart: Selections from her Manuscripts, ed. the Hon. James A. Home (New York & London: Harper Brothers, 1899)
- Letters of Lady Louisa Stuart to Miss Louisa Clinton, ed. the Hon. James A. Home (Edinburgh: D. Douglas, 2 volumes, 1901 and 1903)
- The Letters of Lady Louisa Stuart, selected and with an Introduction by R. Brimley Johnson (London, John Lane The Bodley Head, 1926)
- Memoire of Frances, Lady Douglas (Edinburgh and London, Scottish Academic Press, 1985)

=== About Stuart ===
- Harry Graham, Lady Louisa Stuart (1757–1851), Chapter XVIII of A Group of Scottish Women (New York, Duffield & Co., 1908)
- Susan Buchan, Lady Louisa Stuart: Her Memories and Portraits (London, Hodder & Stoughton, 1932, 275 pages, illustrated, with fold-out genealogical table)
- Professor Karl Miller, Authors (1989): a collection of essays on authors, most living, some of whose work is relevant to the question of what authors mean to their readers. The book centres on the memorial writings of Louisa Stuart and Primo Levi.
- Karl Miller, Stuart, Lady Louisa (1757–1851) in the Oxford Dictionary of National Biography (2004, revised for online edition 2006).

== Portraits ==
Few portraits of Stuart survive. In 1770, Johann Zoffany painted her with her sisters, and this group portrait was used for the cover of Karl Miller's Authors (1989). A portrait of Stuart as a young woman by Mrs Mee is reproduced in James Home's Lady Louisa Stuart: Selections from her Manuscripts (1899) and is currently in the collection of Helen Storey, as is a locket containing a lock of her hair. An oil sketch of Stuart in 1851 by George Hayter was used to illustrate the chapter on her in Harry Graham's A Group of Scottish Women (1908), and was then in the collection of a Lieutenant-Colonel Clinton. A chalk sketch by J. Hayter dated 1837 is in a private collection.
