= Lord William Stuart =

British naval commander and politician (1778–1814)

Captain Lord William Stuart
- Born: 18 November 1778
- Died: 25 July 1814
- Occupation(s): Naval commander and Tory politician

Captain Lord William Stuart (18 November 1778 – 25 July 1814), was a British naval commander and Tory politician.

== Early life ==
Stuart was the fifth son of John Stuart, 1st Marquess of Bute, son of Prime Minister John Stuart, 3rd Earl of Bute. His mother was the Hon. Charlotte Jane, daughter of Herbert Windsor, 2nd Viscount Windsor. He served in the Royal Navy and achieved the rank of captain. In 1802 he was returned to Parliament for Cardiff, succeeding his elder brother Lord Evelyn Stuart, a seat he held until his death twelve years later.

== Personal life ==
Stuart married the Hon. Georgiana, daughter of Cornwallis Maude, 1st Viscount Hawarden, in 1806. They had one daughter, Georgiana, who died unmarried in 1833. His wife died in August 1807. Stuart never remarried and died in July 1814, aged only 35.

Parliament of the United Kingdom
Preceded by Lord Evelyn Stuart	Member of Parliament for Cardiff; 1802–1814	Succeeded by Lord Evelyn Stuart
