= Jean-François, comte de Durat =

French Royal Army officer and colonial administrator

Jean François, Comte de Durat
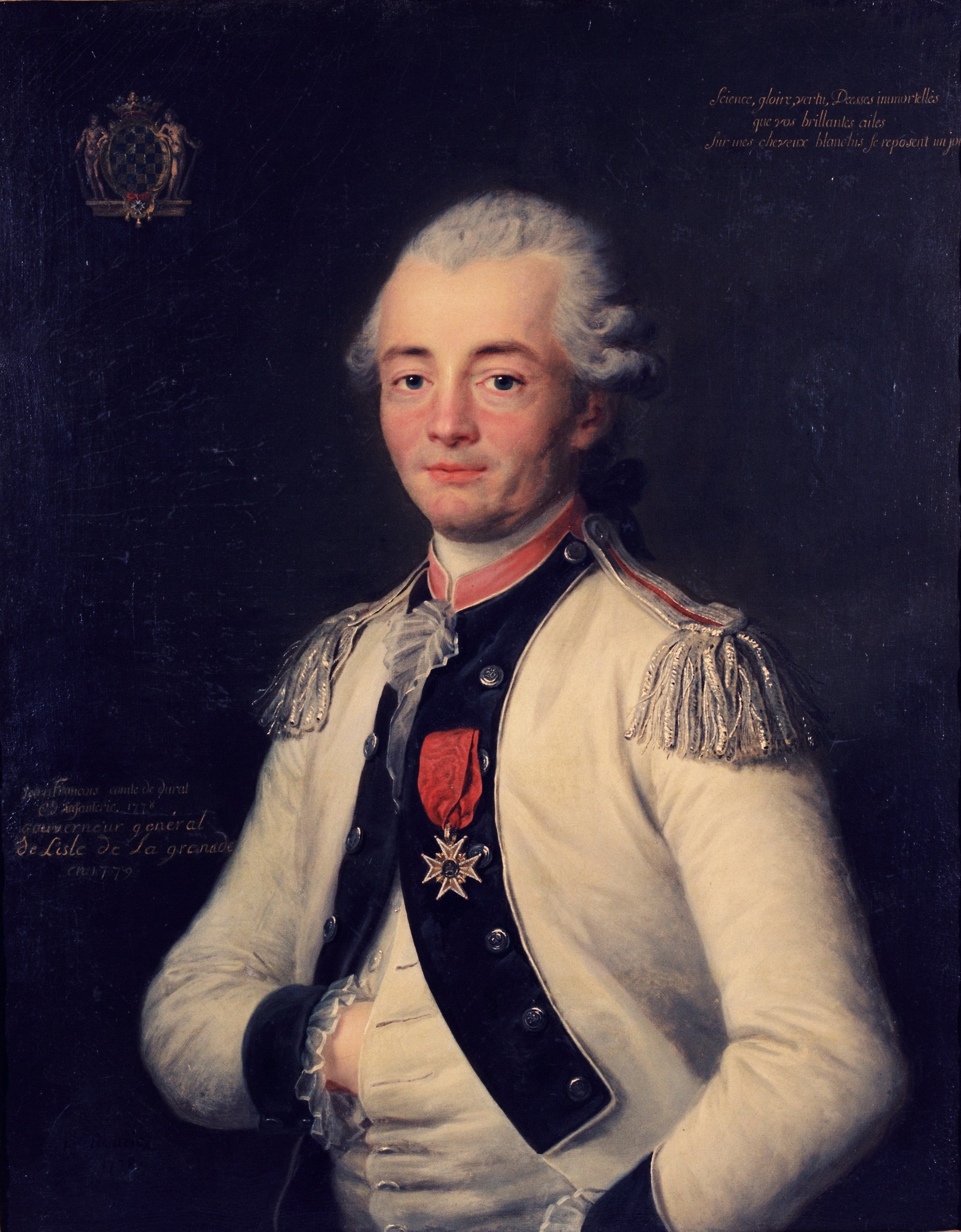

Governor of Grenada
- In office 1779–1783
- Preceded by: George Macartney, 1st Earl Macartney (British governor of Grenada)
- Succeeded by: Jean André de Veron de La Borie

Personal details
- Born: 30 October 1736 Combrailles, France
- Died: 20 January 1830 (aged 93) Combrailles, France

Military service
- Branch/service: French Army
- Years of service: 1751–1788
- Rank: Field Marshal
- Unit: Regiment de Cambrésis
- Battles/wars: Seven Years’ War: Siege of Fort St Philip (1756); American Revolutionary War: Capture of Grenada

Jean-François, comte de Durat (30 October 1736 – 20 January 1830) was a French Royal Army officer and colonial administrator who served as the governor of Grenada from 1779 to 1783.

Born at Chateau Vauchaussades, Combrailles, in the Auvergne, Durat's family had a history of military service. In 1751 he joined the French army, serving in the Seven Years' War. He distinguished himself in the Siege of Fort St Philip, and was assigned to coastal defences until 1759, when he joined a planned expedition against Ireland that failed due to British blockades of French ports. He was sent to the West Indies in 1763, serving as artillery chief at Martinique. In 1774 he was awarded the Order of Saint Louis for his service.

By 1778 he had risen to lieutenant colonel of the Regiment de Cambrésis. The following year he was part of Charles Henri Hector, Count of Estaing's expedition to capture Grenada, leading an advance unit that participated in the storming of Hospital Hill. D'Estaing rewarded Durat by appointing him governor of the island, a post he held until the British retook control under terms of the 1783 Treaty of Paris. Durat's governance was noted by the British residents to be harsh, and there was a backlash against the island's French residents afterward. These divisions contributed to the near-success of the Fédon Rebellion in 1795–96.

After his return to France, he was promoted to brigadier general in 1784, and field marshal in 1788. He died at his home, Chateau Vauchaussade, on 20 January 1830. He was twice married. By his second wife he had a son Sébastien Henri de Durat (1788–1806) who followed him into military service, joined the 34th Line Infantry Regiment and died of wounds sustained at Jena.
