= Mary Stuart, Countess of Bute =

British aristocrat (1718–1794)

The Right Honourable The Countess of Bute
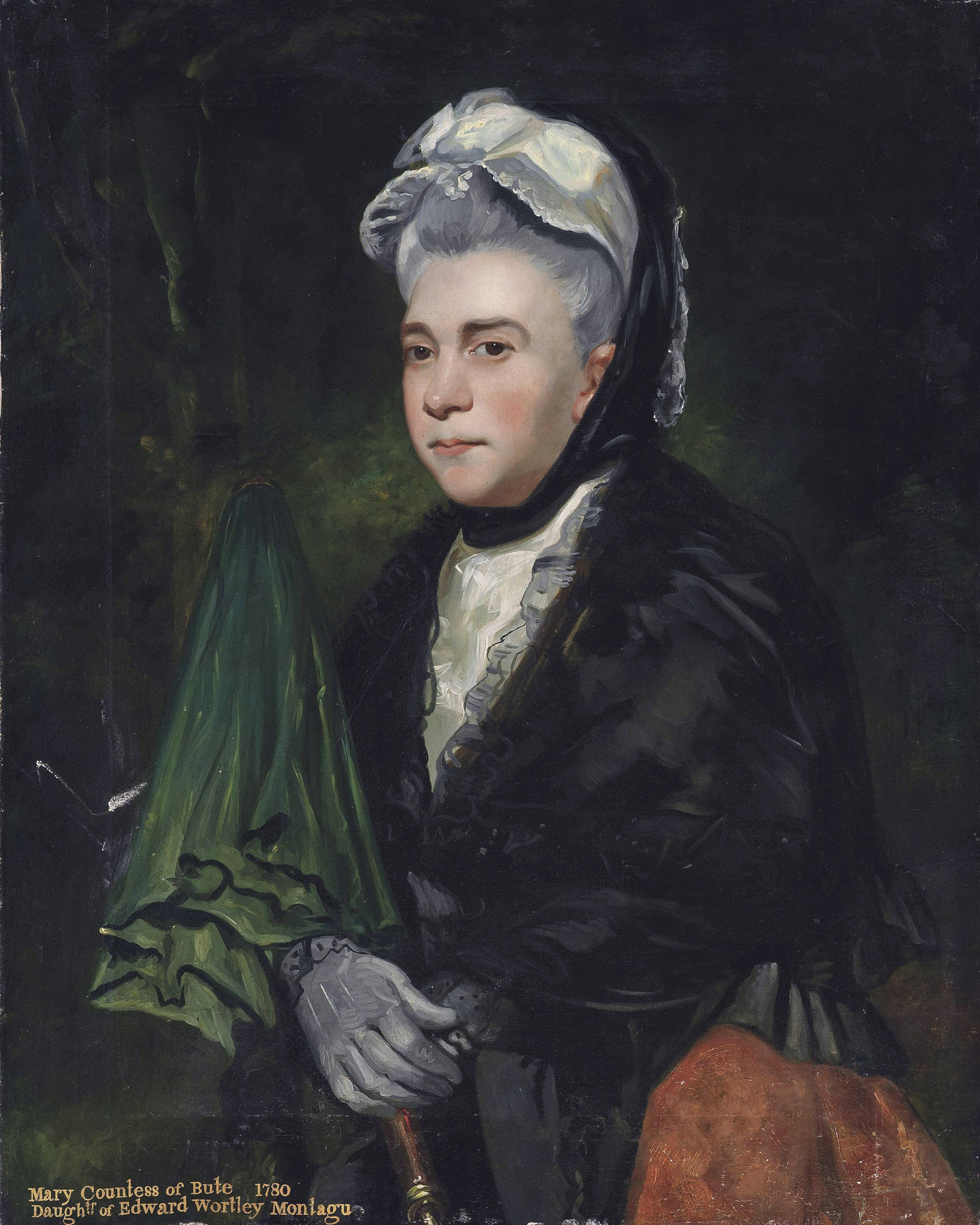
- Lady Bute in 1780
- Born: Mary Wortley Montagu; 19 January 1718; Constantinople, Ottoman Empire
- Died: 6 November 1794 (aged 76); Isleworth, England
- Resting place: St Leonard's Churchyard, Wortley, South Yorkshire, England
- Known for: Spouse of the prime minister of Great Britain (1762–1763)
- Spouse: John Stuart, 3rd Earl of Bute (m. 1736; died 1792)
- Children: 11, including: John Stuart, 1st Marquess of Bute; Hon. James Stuart; Hon Frederick Stuart; Hon. Charles Stuart; Hon. William Stuart; Lady Louisa Stuart
- Parent(s): Sir Edward Wortley Montagu; Lady Mary Pierrepont

Mary Stuart, Countess of Bute, 1st Baroness Mount Stuart (née Wortley Montagu; 19 January 1718 – 6 November 1794) was the wife of British nobleman John Stuart, 3rd Earl of Bute, who served as Prime Minister from 1762 to 1763.

== Early life ==
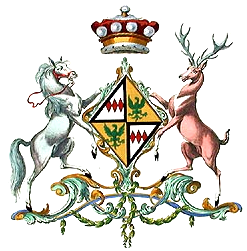
Coat of arms of Baroness Mount Stuart

Lady Bute was born in Constantinople in 1718, the only daughter of Sir Edward Wortley Montagu and Lady Mary Pierrepont, the daughter of Evelyn Pierrepont, 1st Duke of Kingston-upon-Hull. She was born during her father's tenure as ambassador to the Ottoman Empire, which her mother wrote about in her Letters from Turkey. Lady Bute later burned the diaries of her mother, much to the dismay and disapproval of historians.

== Personal life ==
On 24 August 1736, she married John Stuart, 3rd Earl of Bute, who became the prime minister of Great Britain in 1762. The couple had five sons and six daughters, including:

- Lady Mary Stuart (c. 1741–1824), who married James Lowther, later created Earl of Lonsdale in 1761.
- John Stuart, Lord Mount Stuart (1744–1814), a politician who succeeded as 4th Earl of Bute and was later created Marquess of Bute.
- Lady Anne Stuart (b. c. 1745), married Hugh Percy, Lord Warkworth, later the 2nd Duke of Northumberland in 1764.
- The Hon. James Archibald Stuart (1747–1818), a politician and author.
- Lady Augusta Stuart (c. 1748–1778), who married Andrew Corbett.
- Lady Jane Stuart (c. 1748–1828), who married George Macartney, later created Earl Macartney, on 1 February 1768.
- The Hon. Frederick Stuart (1751–1802), politician who died unmarried.
- The Hon. Charles Stuart (1753–1801), a soldier and politician.
- The Hon. William Stuart (1755–1822), Anglican prelate who served as Archbishop of Armagh.
- Lady Caroline Stuart (c. 1756–1813), who married The Hon. John Dawson, later the 1st Earl of Portarlington, in 1778.
- Lady Louisa Stuart (1757–1851), a writer who died unmarried.

In 1761, she was created Baroness Mount Stuart, of Wortley in the county of York, with a remainder to her male heirs by her husband.

Lady Bute died on 6 November 1794 in Isleworth, Middlesex. Her eldest son, John, succeeded to her title.

=== Perception ===
In 1774, Mary Delany wrote to her brother Bernard Granville, Jacobite Duke of Albemarle, saying: "You know so much of Lady Bute that I need say nothing of her agreeableness, her good sense, and good principles, which with great civility must be always pleasing."

Writing for the Oxford Dictionary of National Biography, Karl Wolfgang Schweizer said that: "Lady Bute seems to have been a woman of prudence, loyalty, and tact, greatly devoted to her husband and family."

Peerage of Great Britain
| New creation | Baroness Mount Stuart; 1761–1794 | Succeeded by John Stuart |
