= Lord Evelyn Stuart =

British politician

Colonel Lord Evelyn James Stuart (7 May 1773 – 16 August 1842) was a British soldier and Tory politician.

Stuart was the second son of John Stuart, 1st Marquess of Bute, son of Prime Minister John Stuart, 3rd Earl of Bute. His mother was the Honourable Charlotte Jane, daughter of Herbert Windsor, 2nd Viscount Windsor.

Stuart was elected to the House of Commons in February 1794, succeeding his deceased elder brother Lord Mount Stuart as the member for Cardiff Boroughs, but was not allowed to take his seat in Parliament until his twenty-first birthday in June that year. He continued to represent the constituency until 1802, when he was replaced by his younger brother Lord William Stuart. On the latter's death, Stuart was elected to resume his representation on 7 November 1814, holding the seat until 23 June 1818. He was then replaced by another member of the family, his nephew Lord Patrick Crichton-Stuart.

Apart from his political career he served in the British Army. He was commissioned into the 7th Foot, but transferred to an Independent Company as a Lieutenant in 1791. He later purchased a Captaincy in the 1st Foot Guards, and in 1797 purchased a Majority in the 66th Foot and later the same year the Lieutenant-Colonelcy of the 21st Foot. In 1802 he transferred to the 22nd Foot and in 1805 he was promoted Brevet Colonel.

Stuart never married. He died in August 1842 at Walworth, aged 69, and was buried at West Norwood Cemetery.

Parliament of Great Britain
Preceded by Lord Mount Stuart	Member of Parliament for Cardiff; 1794–1801	Succeeded by Parliament of the United Kingdom
Parliament of the United Kingdom
Preceded by Parliament of Great Britain	Member of Parliament for Cardiff; 1801–1802	Succeeded by Lord William Stuart
Preceded by Lord William Stuart	Member of Parliament for Cardiff; 1814–1818	Succeeded by Lord Patrick Crichton-Stuart
