= 92nd Regiment of Foot (1779) =

- Active: 1779–1783
- Country: Kingdom of Great Britain (1707–1800)
- Branch: British Army
- Type: Infantry

Commanders
- Colonel of the Regiment: Lt-Col. Hon. James Stuart-Wortley

The 92nd Regiment of Foot, also known as the Yorkshire Rangers, was a short-lived infantry regiment in the British Army which was raised in 1779 to provide garrison troops for the West Indies during the American Revolutionary War.

The colonel-commandant of the regiment was Lt-Col. Hon. James Stuart-Wortley, second son of John Stuart, 3rd Earl of Bute.

After spending several years stationed in Jamaica, the regiment was disbanded in England after the Treaty of Paris in 1783.
