= Anne Stuart Percy, Lady Warkworth =

Wife of Hugh Percy, 2nd Duke of Northumberland (1745-1813)

Anne Stuart Percy
- Born: Anne Crichton-Stuart c.1745
- Died: 20 January 1813 (aged 67–68)
- Spouse: Hugh Percy, later Duke of Northumberland (m. 1764; div. 1779)
- Father: John Stuart, 3rd Earl of Bute
- Mother: Mary Wortley Montagu, 1st Baroness Mount Stuart

Anne Stuart Percy, Lady Warkworth (c.1745 – 20 January 1813), also known as "Lady Percy" (Countess Percy), was the first wife of Hugh Percy, later Duke of Northumberland (1742–1817). She is known for her association with the novelist Laurence Sterne, with whom she may have had an intimate relationship.

== Biography ==
Anne Crichton-Stuart was the third daughter of John Stuart, 3rd Earl of Bute, and his wife Mary. She married Percy on 2 July 1764, when she was still in their teens, two years before his father was raised to a dukedom and he gained the title "Earl Percy". At the time of their marriage, he was known as "Lord Warkworth". The ceremony was conducted by Bishop Stone the Primate of Ireland.

Before and during her marriage, there is evidence of Lady Warkworth's friendship with Laurence Sterne, and she is thought to be the woman to whom he refers in his diary as "Sheba". Lord and Lady Warkworth had no children, and were legally separated in 1769. Servants and acquaintances later testified that Percy had not visited his wife since 1771.

In 1779, Percy applied to the House of Lords for a divorce, on the grounds that his wife had committed adultery with a Mr Bird while he was abroad. Servants were called to testify to Lady Percy's relationship with a Mr Bird of Coventry, whom she had met at Southampton while visiting her sister, Lady Augusta Corbett. She did not oppose the divorce, which was granted. Shortly afterwards, Percy married Frances Julia Burrell.
