= Capture of Grenada (1779) =

1779 battle of the American Revolutionary War

Coordinates: 12.05°N 61.75°W

- Part of the American Revolutionary War and the Anglo-French War (1778–1783)
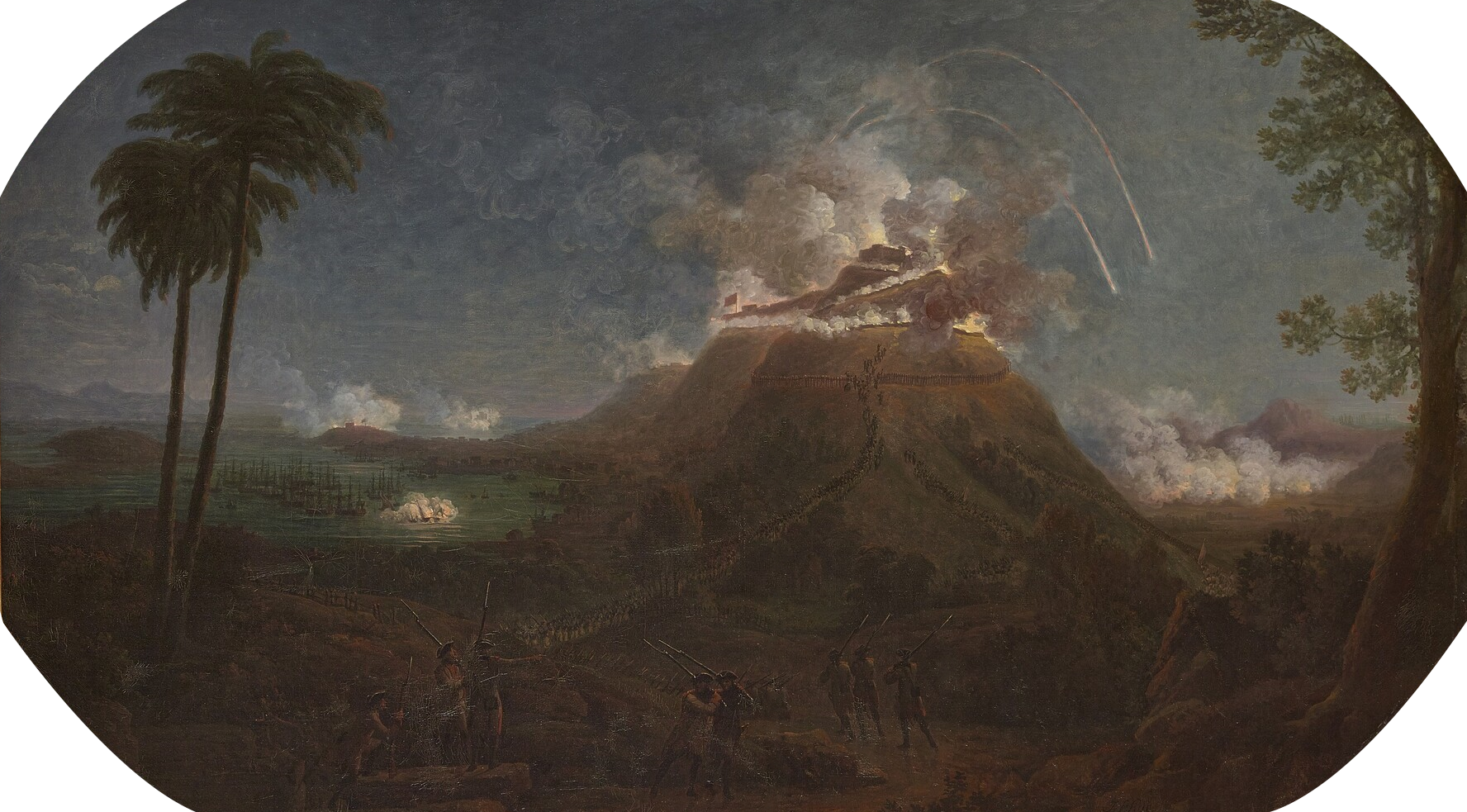
- Capture of the island of Grenada, 4 July 1779; Jean-François Hue, 1787
Date	2–4 July 1779
Location	Grenada, British West Indies
Result	French victory

Belligerents
France	Great Britain

Commanders and leaders
Count of Estaing; Arthur Dillon	Lord Macartney (POW)

Strength
2,100 men 25 ships of the line	125 regulars 436 militia and volunteers

Casualties and losses
114 killed 200 wounded	Unknown killed or wounded 700 captured

The capture of Grenada was an amphibious expedition in July 1779 during the American Revolutionary War. A French fleet under Admiral Charles Henri Hector, Count of Estaing captured the island of Grenada from the British. The French landed on 2 July and the assault occurred on the night of 3–4 July. The French forces assaulted the British fortifications on Hospital Hill, overlooking the island's capital, Saint George's. The fortification's cannons were captured and turned against Fort George. British Governor Lord Macartney opened negotiations to surrender.

Estaing controversially rejected Macartney's terms of capitulation, instead insisting on him adopting the harsher terms he had written. Macartney rejected those terms, choosing to surrender unconditionally. Estaing thereafter permitted his forces to loot the town, and Macartney was sent to France as a prisoner of war. On 5 July, French forces re-embarked when word arrived that a British fleet under Admiral John Byron was approaching. The two fleets battled the next day. The French severely damaged several British ships; however, both fleets returned to their bases fully intact. Under the terms of the 1783 Treaty of Paris, France returned Grenada to British control.

== Background ==
Following France's entry into the American Revolutionary War as an American ally in early 1778, French Admiral Charles Henri Hector, Count of Estaing arrived in the West Indies in early December 1778 commanding a fleet of twelve ships of the line and a number of smaller vessels. At about the same time a British fleet under Admiral William Hotham also arrived, augmenting the West Indies fleet of Admiral Samuel Barrington. The British then captured French-held St. Lucia, despite Estaing's attempt at relief. The British used St. Lucia to monitor the French on Martinique, where Estaing was based.

The British fleet was further reinforced in January 1779 by ten ships of the line under Admiral John Byron, who assumed command of the British Leeward Islands station. Throughout the first half of 1779, both fleets received additional reinforcements, after which the French fleet was superior to that of the British. Byron departed St. Lucia on 6 June in order to provide escort services to British merchant ships gathering at St. Kitts for a convoy to Europe, leaving Estaing free to act. Estaing and the governor of Martinique, François Claude Amour, marquis de Bouillé, seized the opportunity to begin a series of operations against nearby British colonies.

Their first target, the isle of Saint Vincent, fell on 18 June, and Estaing turned his attention to other islands. He had hoped to capture Barbados, a key British possession, but after making no progress against the prevailing easterly trade winds, he turned his attention instead to Grenada.

== British defences ==
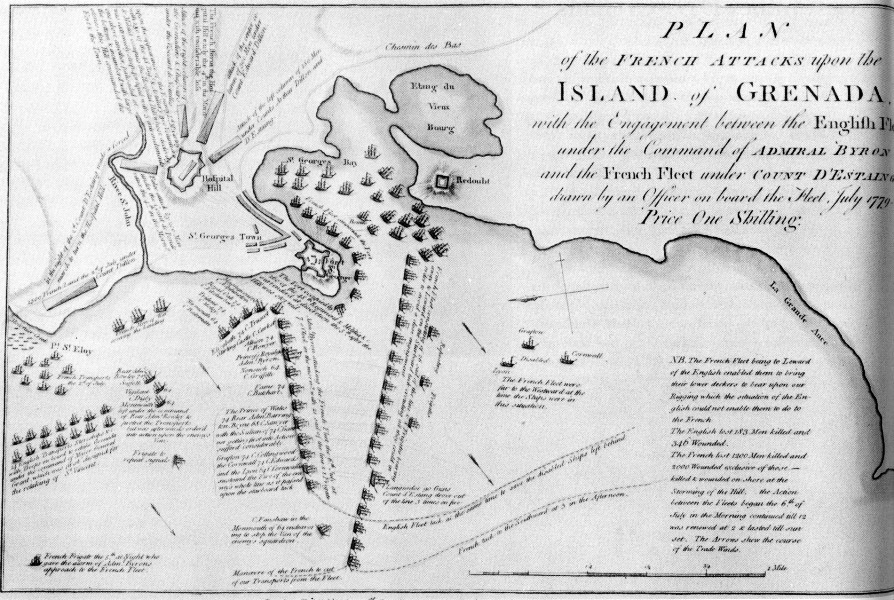
Plan of the French attacks

Grenada was one of Britain's richest colonies, producing significant quantities of sugar on its plantations. Lord Macartney, the British governor, had been alerted to the possibility of a French attack. He made repeated requests for support to Admiral Byron and the British commander at St. Kitts but was told that Saint Vincent was the principal French interest. However, Byron stated he would bring relief should Grenada be attacked.

Macartney had at his disposal 101 soldiers of the 48th Regiment of Foot and 24 men of the Royal Artillery. He also had over 400 militia and volunteers but did not consider these forces dependable because a third of them were of French descent. He ordered the construction of significant fortifications on Hospital Hill, a prominence overlooking the island capital St. George's. The steep hillsides were fortified by stone walls, and the hilltop had a palisade surrounding a series of entrenchments.

== French capture ==
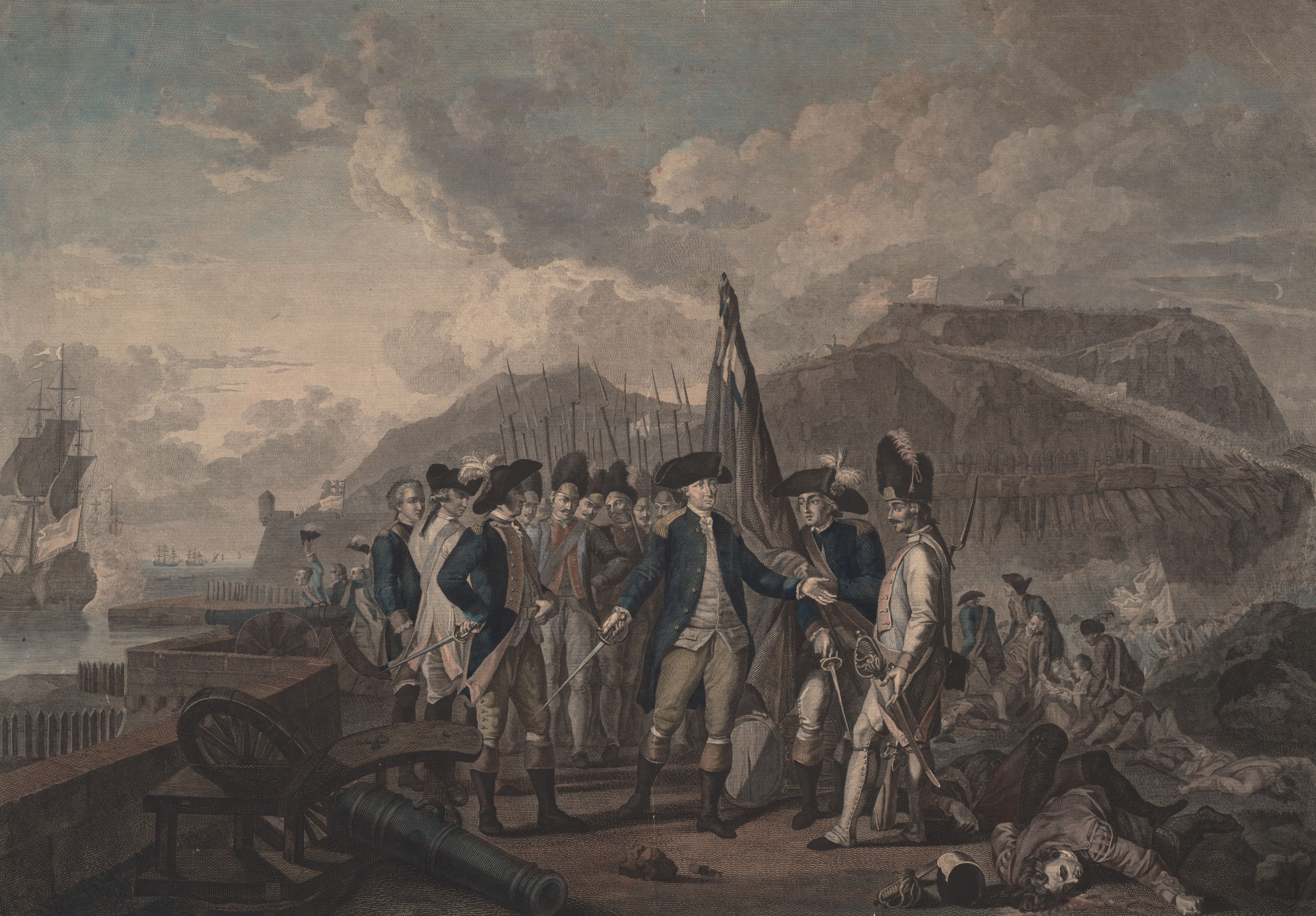
1779 engraving of the French on Hospital Hill after its capture

The French fleet anchored off the Grenada coast just north of St. George's on 2 July. The troops that Estaing landed that day consisted of the 1,400-man Dillon's Regiment and 700 troops drawn from the Champagne, Foix, Auxerrois, and Hainaut regiments. With the arrival of the French, Macartney ordered his forces to withdraw behind the fortifications of Hospital Hill. Estaing spent 3 July reconnoitring the British position. Concerned that Byron might appear at any time, he decided to launch an attack on Hospital Hill. He first sent a parley flag to Macartney demanding his surrender; the British governor rejected the demand.

Estaing's plan of attack called for three columns to attack the back side of the fortifications with bayonets, while a small fourth detachment made a demonstration from a location where the British might more reasonably expect an attack, in other words a decoy or distraction. On the evening of 3 July these formations moved out. The columns, each numbering 300 men, were led by Arthur Dillon, Édouard Dillon, and the comte de Noailles. Arthur Dillon's column was accompanied by an advance guard of 180 under the comte de Durat, and the demonstration force numbered just 200. At 4:00 am on the 4th the demonstration force opened fire, while the other three columns charged up Hospital Hill. The British defenders panicked and most fled down the hill to the apparent safety of Fort George.

The British, in their haste to leave the premises, neglected to spike some of the cannons (driving a metal spike into the touchhole, rendering the cannon inoperative). They also abandoned many valuables that had been brought up to Hospital Hill for safekeeping. The French used the captured cannons to fire upon Fort George. Realizing the situation was hopeless, Macartney raised a white flag. The French took about 700 prisoners, and claimed casualties of 36 killed and 71 wounded. British reports, however, claimed the French casualties numbered closer to 300. The French also captured 200 British merchantmen anchored in the harbour.

Estaing rejected Macartney's proposed terms of capitulations, countering with a list of articles that he had drafted. Macartney found Estaing's proposed articles "not merely unprecedented and humiliating, but so ensnaring and uncertain in their nature, extent, and aim that they might at any time supply a pretext for taking away the lives, together with the fortunes, of the capitulants." His council was unanimous in rejecting the proposed capitulation, and the British chose to surrender unconditionally instead. As a consequence, Estaing permitted his troops to pillage St. George's. Among the items taken or destroyed were most of Macartney's silver and plate, much of his clothing, and his personal papers. The latter came as a particularly harsh blow to Macartney, for copies of those papers sent to St. Lucia with his wife for safeguarding were destroyed by fire. When Estaing invited Macartney to dine with him, the governor apologised for his garb, noting that the coat he was wearing was the only one left him. Macartney and other leading Grenadians were also refused parole, and were sent to France as prisoners of war.

== Aftermath ==
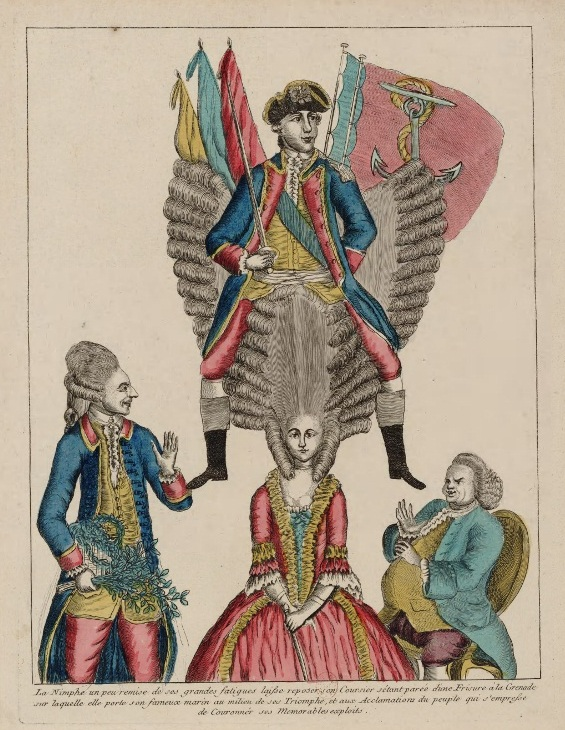
French political cartoon praising Estaing for his successes

Byron had been alerted to the capture of Saint Vincent on 1 July and was en route with a force to retake it when he learned of the attack on Grenada. He immediately sailed there, arriving on the morning of 6 July. Estaing, alerted to Byron's intentions on the 5th, embarked most of the troops and weighed anchor at 4:00 am on the 6th. The fleets fought the inconclusive Battle of Grenada, with Estaing resisting Byron's disorganised attack but missing an opportunity to inflict significant damage on his fleet. There were no further major actions in the West Indies before Estaing sailed north and led an unsuccessful siege of British-held Savannah, Georgia in September.

Estaing's successes in capturing Grenada and defeating Byron made him immensely popular in France. Playwright and actor Pierre-Germain Parisau wrote Veni, Vidi, Vici, ou La Prise de Grenade containing a re-enactment of the capture. Estaing did not see the popular work, but John Paul Jones attended a performance during a visit to Paris. During their occupation, the French began construction of a series of fortifications on Richmond Hill. Designed to defend against an attack like theirs, its cannons pointed to the landward rather than seaward side. These defences were completed by the British after 1783.

Both Grenada and Saint Vincent remained in French hands until the end of the war, when they were returned to Britain under the terms of the 1783 Treaty of Paris. The rule of the comte de Durat, who was appointed governor by Estaing, was reported by British residents to be harsh and oppressive. Once the British resumed control, they cracked down on the predominantly Roman Catholic French-speaking population, leading to discontent and an exodus of French Grenadians to Trinidad. These religious and cultural divisions in Grenadian society contributed to the rise of local resistance which culminated in the Fédon Rebellion breaking out in 1795.
