= John Stuart-Wortley =

John Stuart-Wortley (8 April 1773 – 14 January 1797) was a British politician and the eldest son of Col. James Archibald Stuart-Wortley.

As the eldest son, he replaced his father as member of parliament for the borough of Bossiney during the 1796 election. However, he died young (approx. age 24) in January 1797, and his younger brother James Stuart-Wortley thereafter took his seat.

Parliament of Great Britain
| Preceded by James Archibald Stuart-Wortley; Evelyn Pierrepont | Member of Parliament for Bossiney; 1796–1797; With: John Lubbock | Succeeded by James Stuart-Wortley; John Lubbock |
