= Portrait of the Earl of Bute =

Painting by Joshua Reynolds

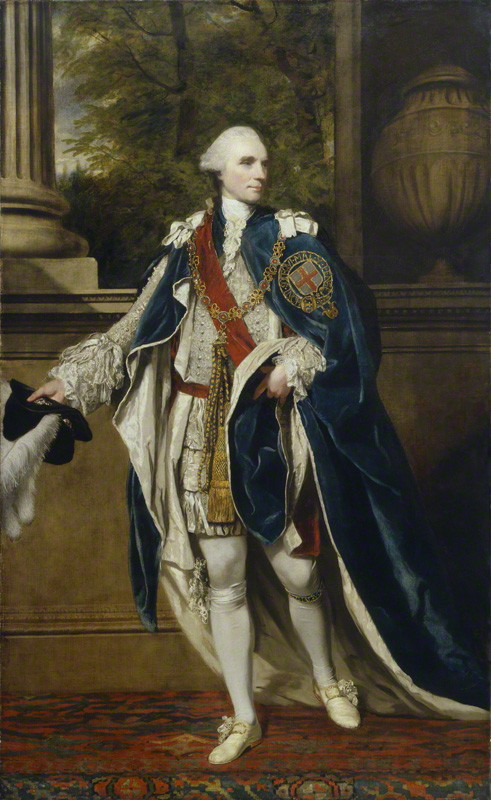
- Artist: Joshua Reynolds
- Year: 1773
- Type: Oil on canvas, portrait painting
- Dimensions: 236.9 cm × 144.8 cm (93.3 in × 57.0 in)
- Location: National Portrait Gallery, London

Portrait of the Earl of Bute is a 1773 portrait painting by the English artist Sir Joshua Reynolds. It depicts the Scottish aristocrat and politician John Stuart, Earl of Bute. Bute had been the tutor to George III and in May 1762 became Prime Minister. His premiership aroused much controversy, particularly around the terms of the Treaty of Paris that ended the Seven Years' War, and he resigned after less than a year in the office in April 1763. By the time he sat for the painting he was aged sixty and had largely retired from public life.

Reynolds was one of the leading portraitists of Georgian Britain and since 1768 had been the President of the Royal Academy. He depicts Bute at full-length wearing the robes of the Order of the Garter to which he has recently been appointed. His stance echoes that of the Apollo Belvedere. The painting was displayed at the Art Treasures Exhibition in Manchester in 1857. The original picture remains in the Bute Family but a near identical version is now in the collection of the National Portrait Gallery, having been purchased with the assistance of the Art Fund in 1958.

== Bibliography ==
- Esposito, Donato. Sir Joshua Reynolds: The Acquisition of Genius. Sansom, 2009.
- Fordham, Douglas. British Art and the Seven Years' War: Allegiance and Autonomy. University of Pennsylvania Press, 2010
- Ingamells, John. National Portrait Gallery Mid-Georgian Portraits, 1760-1790. National Portrait Gallery, 2004.
