= Combrailles =

- Commune
- Location of Combrailles
- Location within France Location within Auvergne-Rhône-Alpes
- Coordinates: 45°50′28″N 2°37′59″E
- Country: France
- Region: Auvergne-Rhône-Alpes
- Department: Puy-de-Dôme
- Arrondissement: Riom
- Canton: Saint-Ours
- Intercommunality: CC Chavanon Combrailles et Volcans

Government
  - Mayor (2020–2026): Jacky Pougheon
- Area^{1}: 20.61 km^{2} (7.96 sq mi)
- Elevation: 650 m (2,130 ft)
- Highest elevation: 748 m (2,454 ft)
- Lowest elevation: 550 m (1,800 ft)
- Population (2023): 212
  - Density: 10.3/km^{2} (26.6/sq mi)
- Time zone: UTC+01:00 (CET)
  - Summer (DST): UTC+02:00 (CEST)
- INSEE/Postal code: 63115 /63380
- ^{1} French Land Register data, which excludes lakes, ponds, glaciers > 1 km^{2} (0.386 sq mi or 247 acres) and river estuaries.

Combrailles (French pronunciation: [kɔ̃bʁaj]; Occitan: Combralha) is a commune in the Puy-de-Dôme department in Auvergne-Rhône-Alpes in central France.

== See also ==
- Communes of the Puy-de-Dôme department
