= The Three Sons of the Earl of Bute =

1764 painting by Johann Zoffany

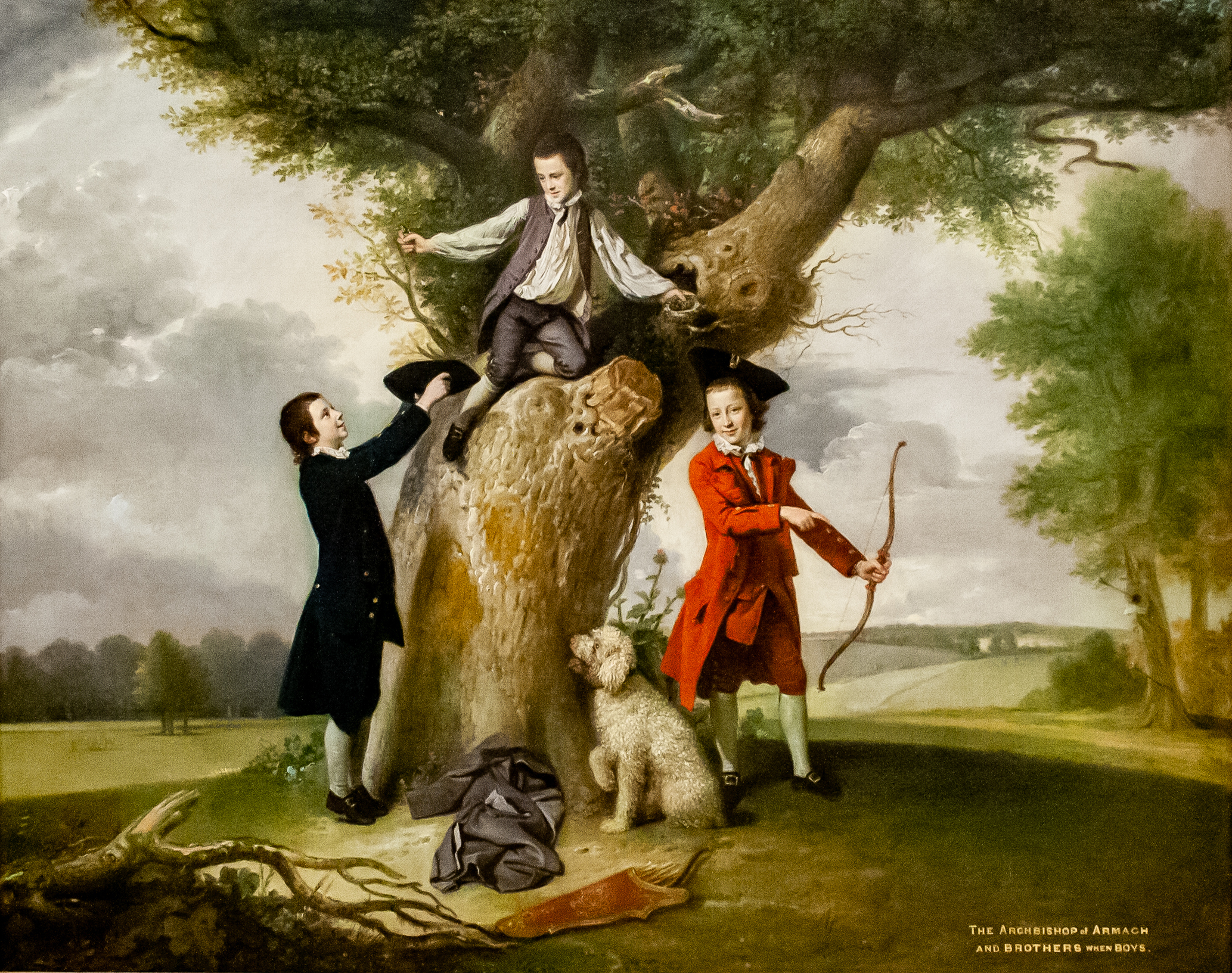
- Artist: Johan Zoffany
- Year: c. 1764
- Type: Oil on canvas, portrait painting
- Dimensions: 100.9 cm × 126 cm (39.7 in × 50 in)
- Location: Tate Britain, London

The Three Sons of the Earl of Bute is an oil on canvas portrait painting by the German-born artist Johann Zoffany, from c. 1764. The painting depicts the three eldest sons of the British politician John Stuart, 3rd Earl of Bute.

== History and description ==
A conversation piece, It depicts the three eldest sons of the British politician John Stuart, 3rd Earl of Bute. A favourite of George III, Bute replaced the Duke of Newcastle as Prime Minister in 1762. However the Treaty of Paris he signed ending the Seven Years' War with France and Spain made him deeply unpopular and he resigned in April 1763 to be replaced by George Grenville.

The three boys are shown around a tree on Bute's country estate of Luton Park in Bedfordshire. They have abandoned archery to look at nesting birds. The painting may have been started around the time Bute resigned his office. Today the painting is in the collection of the Tate Britain in Pimlico having been acquired in 2002 through the acceptance in lieu scheme, with support from the Tate members and the Art Fund.

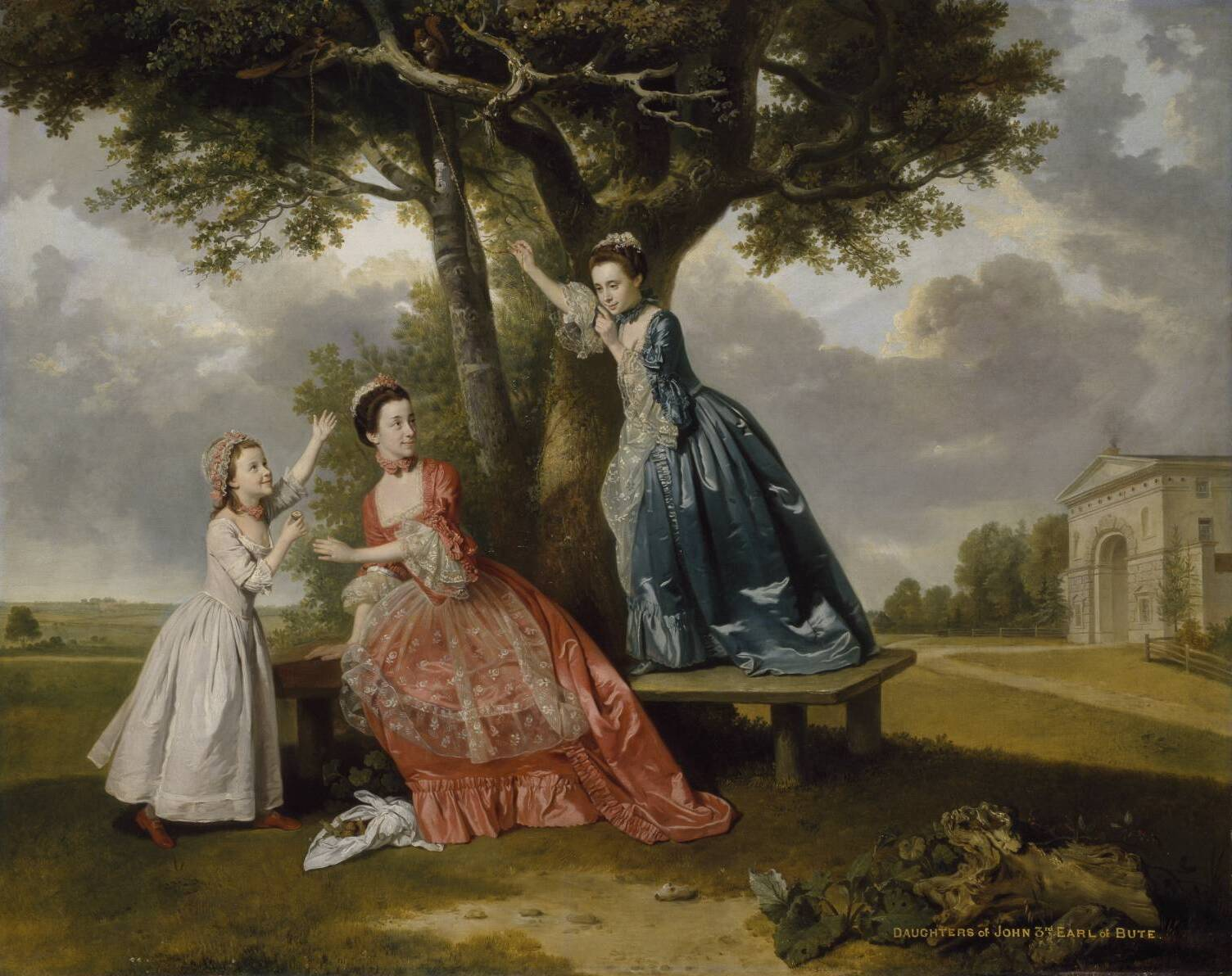
The Three Daughters of the Earl of Bute by Zoffany

Bute also commissioned a companion painting of his three daughters from Zoffany, which was also acquired by the Tate in 2002. It features the three girls posed in a similar composition.

== Bibliography ==
- Felus, Kate. The Secret Life of the Georgian Garden: Beautiful Objects and Agreeable Retreats. Bloomsbury Publishing, 2016.
- Langmuir, Erika. Imagining Childhood. Yale University Press, 2006.
- Treadwell, Penelope. Johan Zoffany: Artist and Adventurer. Paul Holberton, 2009.
- Webster, Mary. Johan Zoffany, 1733-1810. National Portrait Gallery, 1976.
