= James Stuart-Wortley-Mackenzie =

British politician (1747–1818)

Colonel James Archibald Stuart, later Stuart-Wortley-Mackenzie (19 September 1747 – 1 March 1818), British politician and soldier, was the second son of John Stuart, 3rd Earl of Bute and his wife Mary Stuart, Countess of Bute.

On 8 June 1767 he married Margaret Cunynghame, daughter of Sir David Cunynghame, 3rd Baronet, and they had five children:

- John Stuart-Wortley (1773–1797)
- James Stuart-Wortley-Mackenzie, 1st Baron Wharncliffe (1776–1845), ancestor of Bear Grylls.
- Mary Stuart-Wortley (d. 9 March 1855), married on 1 June 1813 William Dundas (d. 1845)
- Louisa Harcourt Stuart-Wortley (October 1781 – 31 January 1848), married in London on 22 June 1801 George Percy, 2nd Earl of Beverley, later Duke of Northumberland
- George Stuart-Wortley (1783–1813)

Appointed Lieutenant-Colonel of the Bedfordshire Militia in 1776, he raised the 92nd Regiment of Foot in 1779, and was appointed lieutenant-colonel commanding. He brought it to the West Indies in 1780, and suffered severely in health. He returned home in 1783, and the regiment was disbanded following the Treaty of Paris.

Upon the death of his mother, in 1794, he inherited the properties of the Wortley family, and assumed that surname on 17 January 1795. In 1800, he added the additional surname of Mackenzie, having succeeded to the estates of his uncle James Stuart Mackenzie.

Parliament of Great Britain
Preceded by Alexander Wedderburn	Member of Parliament for Ayr Burghs; 1768–1774	Succeeded by Sir George Macartney
Preceded by The Viscount Fortrose (for Caithness)	Member of Parliament for Buteshire; 1774–1780	Succeeded by John Sinclair (for Caithness)
Preceded by Viscount Cranborne; Sir Ralph Payne	Member of Parliament for Plympton Erle; 1780–1784; With: Sir Ralph Payne	Succeeded by Paul Treby Ourry; John Stephenson
Preceded by John Sinclair (for Caithness)	Member of Parliament for Buteshire; 1784–1790	Succeeded by Sir John Sinclair, Bt (for Caithness)
Preceded by Charles Stuart; Matthew Montagu	Member of Parliament for Bossiney; 1790–1796; With: Humphrey Minchin 1790–1796; Evelyn Pierrepont 1796	Succeeded by John Stuart-Wortley; John Lubbock
Parliament of the United Kingdom
Preceded by Sir John Sinclair, Bt (for Caithness)	Member of Parliament for Buteshire; 1806–1807	Succeeded by Sir John Sinclair, Bt (for Caithness)
Military offices
Preceded by Regiment raised	Lieutenant-Colonel of the 92nd Regiment of Foot; 1779–1783	Succeeded by Regiment disbanded
