= John Stuart, 1st Marquess of Bute =

British diplomat and politician (1744–1814)

The Most Honourable The Marquess of Bute PC FRS
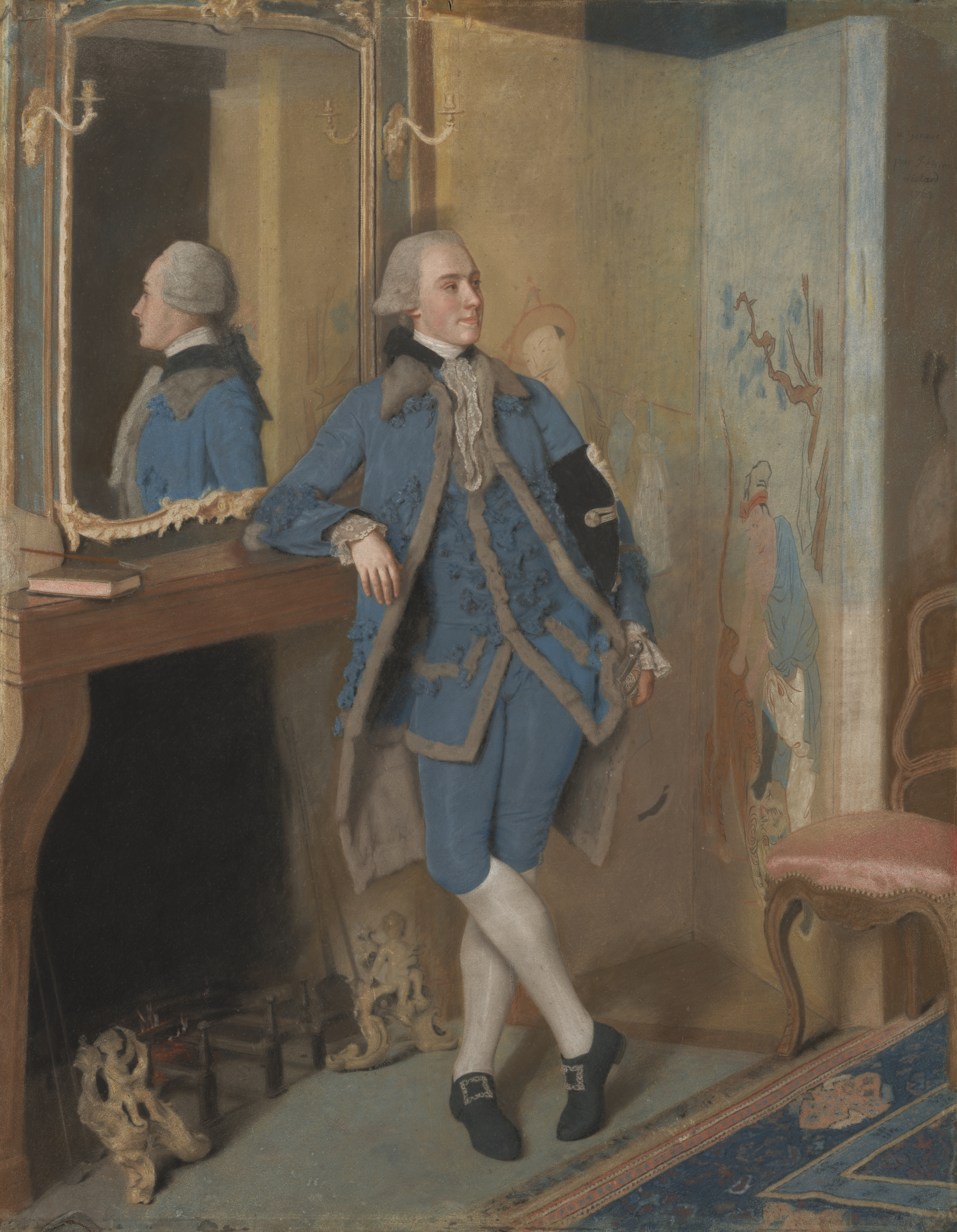
- Portrait by Jean-Étienne Liotard, c. 1763

Personal details
- Born: John Stuart; 30 June 1744 Mount Stuart House, Isle of Bute
- Died: 16 November 1814 (aged 70) Geneva, Switzerland
- Party: Tory
- Spouse(s): Lady Charlotte Hickman-Windsor (m. 1766) Frances Coutts (m. 1800)
- Children: John Stuart, Lord Mount Stuart; Lord Evelyn Stuart; Lady Charlotte Stuart; Lord Henry Stuart; Lord William Stuart; Lord George Stuart; Lady Frances Stuart; Lord Dudley Stuart
- Parent(s): John Stuart, 3rd Earl of Bute; Lady Mary Wortley Montagu
- Education: Winchester College; University of Oxford

John Stuart, 1st Marquess of Bute, PC, FRS (30 June 1744 – 16 November 1814), styled Lord Mount Stuart until 1792 and known as the Earl of Bute between 1792 and 1794, was a British diplomat and politician who represented Bossiney in the House of Commons of Great Britain from 1766 to 1776.

== Early life ==
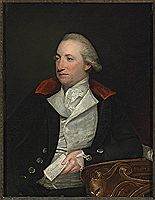
1784 portrait of Stuart by Gainsborough Dupont

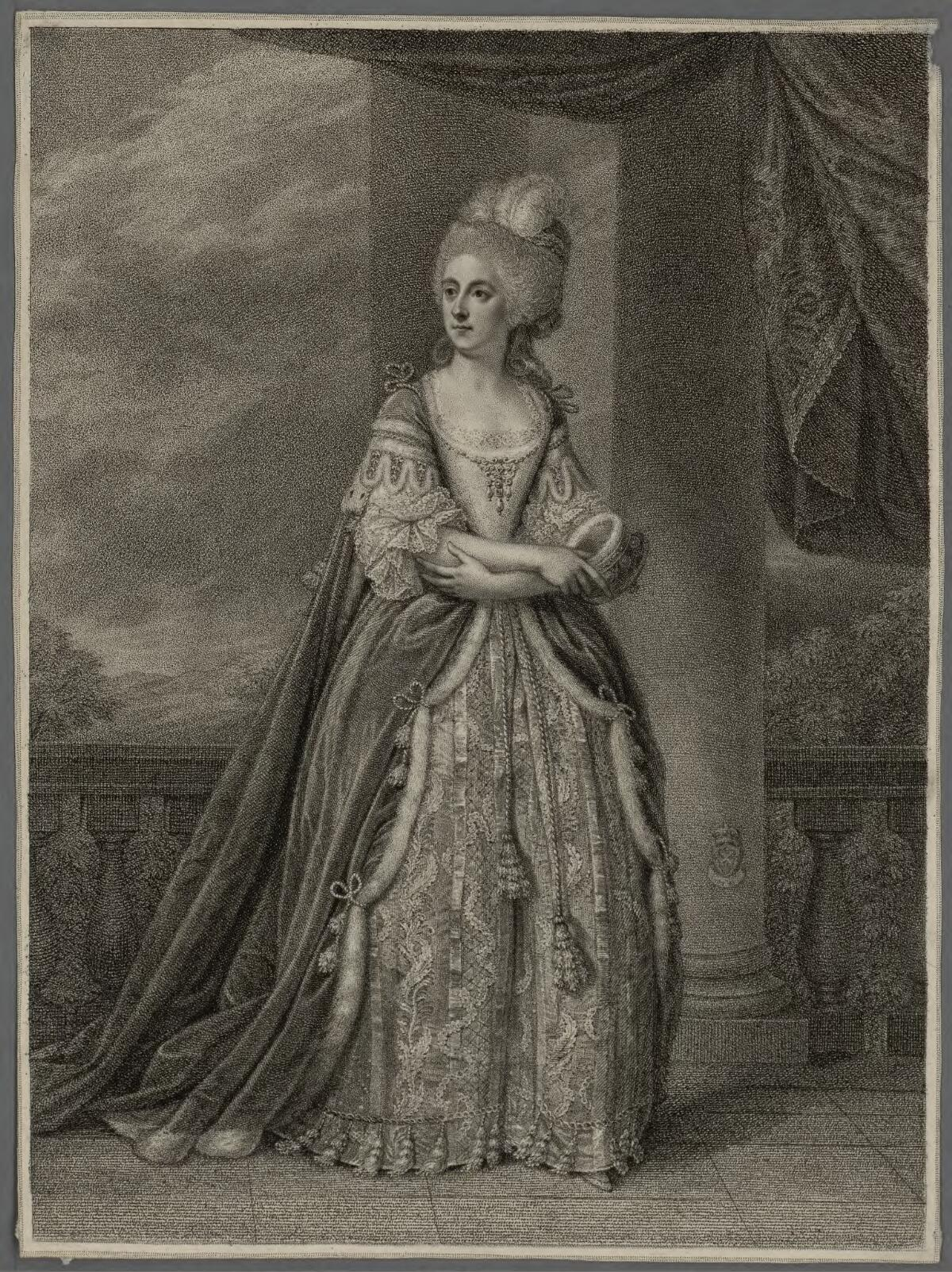
1790s portrait of Charlotte Stuart

Stuart was born at Mount Stuart House on the Isle of Bute, the son of prime minister John Stuart, 3rd Earl of Bute, and his wife Mary Wortley Montagu. He was educated at Harrow School and Winchester College. He went to the University of Oxford, where he had private tuition from James Bladen. The degree of D.C.L., awarded to him by the university in 1793, was honorary. Around 1757 Stuart began to be tutored by the philosopher Adam Ferguson.

== Political career ==
Lord Mount Stuart was returned as Tory Member of Parliament for Bossiney at a by-election in 1766. He was returned in the general elections of 1768 and 1774. On 2 November 1775, he announced in the House of Commons his intention to introduce a bill to establish a militia in Scotland, and during the next few months James Boswell assisted in seeking support for the bill in Scotland. In March 1776 the bill was debated, but ultimately failed to pass. He left the House of Commons in 1776 when he was elevated to the Peerage of Great Britain in his own right as Baron Cardiff, of Cardiff Castle in the County of Glamorgan. Though this title was also used, he continued to be known by his courtesy title of Lord Mount Stuart. (He ranked higher in the order of precedence as the heir to an earldom than he did as a substantive baron.)

Stuart served as Lord Lieutenant of Glamorgan from 1772 to 1793 and, from 1794 to his death, taking command of the Glamorgan Militia as Lieutenant-Colonel Commandant when it was embodied on 26 March 1778. In 1779, Lord Mount Stuart was sworn of the Privy Council and was sent as an envoy to the court of Turin. He was ambassador to Spain in 1783. He held the sinecure of Auditor of the imprests from 1781 until the abolition of the office in 1785, upon which he was paid £7000 compensation. He was the first Lord Lieutenant of Buteshire from 1794 until his death. Lord Mount Stuart succeeded his father in the earldom in 1792. In 1794 he was created Viscount Mountjoy, in the Isle of Wight, Earl of Windsor and Marquess of Bute. (The Mountjoy and Windsor titles recognised the Barony of Mountjoy and Viscountcy of Windsor previously held by his father-in-law, the 2nd Viscount Windsor, which had both become extinct on Lord Windsor's death in 1758.) Lord Bute was inducted as a Fellow of the Royal Society on 12 December 1799.

== Family ==
Lord Mount Stuart married an heiress, the Honourable Charlotte Hickman-Windsor (1746–1800), daughter of Herbert Hickman-Windsor, 2nd Viscount Windsor, on 12 November 1766. They had seven sons and two daughters. Those included:

- John Stuart, Lord Mount Stuart (25 September 1767 – 22 January 1794), whose son succeeded as 2nd Marquess
- Lord Evelyn Stuart (1773–1842), a colonel in the army
- Lady Charlotte Stuart (c. 1775 – 5 September 1847), married Sir William Homan, 1st Baronet
- Lord Henry Stuart (7 June 1777 – 19 August 1809), father of Henry Villiers-Stuart, 1st Baron Stuart de Decies
- Captain Lord William Stuart (18 November 1778 – 28 July 1814)
- Rear-Admiral Lord George Stuart (1 March 1780 – 19 February 1841)

Charlotte died on 28 January 1800. He then married Frances Coutts, daughter of Thomas Coutts, on 17 September 1800. They had two children:

- Lady Frances Stuart (d. 29 March 1859) - Dudley Ryder, 2nd Earl of Harrowby
- Lord Dudley Coutts Stuart (11 January 1803 – 17 November 1854)

His second wife outlived him, and died on 12 November 1832.

In 1799 he (or his immediate family benefit trust) was estimated the second-wealthiest small family unit in Britain owning £4.2M (equivalent to £414,800,000 in 2025), notably as to coal-bearing and agricultural land.

== Footnotes ==
Parliament of Great Britain
Preceded by Edward Wortley-Montagu; John Richmond Webb	Member of Parliament for Bossiney; 1766–1776; With: Edward Wortley-Montagu 1766–1768; Henry Luttrell 1768–1769, 1774–1776; Sir George Osborn, Bt 1769–1774	Succeeded by Henry Luttrell; Charles Stuart
Honorary titles
Preceded by The Earl of Plymouth	Lord Lieutenant of Glamorgan; 1772–1793	Succeeded by Lord Mount Stuart
Vacant Title last held by Lord Mount Stuart	Lord Lieutenant of Glamorgan; 1794–1814	Succeeded by The Marquess of Bute
New title Office created	Lord Lieutenant of Buteshire; 1794–1814	Succeeded by The Marquess of Bute
Diplomatic posts
Preceded by William Lynch	British Minister to Sardinia; 1779–1783	Succeeded by Hon. John Hampden-Trevor
Political offices
Preceded by William Aislabie; The Lord Sondes	Auditor of the Imprests; 1781–1785; With: The Lord Sondes	Office abolished
Peerage of Scotland
Preceded by John Stuart	Earl of Bute; 1792–1814	Succeeded by John Crichton-Stuart
Peerage of Great Britain
New creation	Marquess of Bute; 1796–1814	Succeeded by John Crichton-Stuart
Preceded by Mary Wortley-Montagu	Baron Mount Stuart; 1794–1814	Succeeded by John Crichton-Stuart
New creation	Baron Cardiff; 1776–1814	Succeeded by John Crichton-Stuart
