= George Macartney, 1st Earl Macartney =

British diplomat, politician and colonial administrator (1737–1806)

The Right Honourable The Earl Macartney KB PC (Ire)
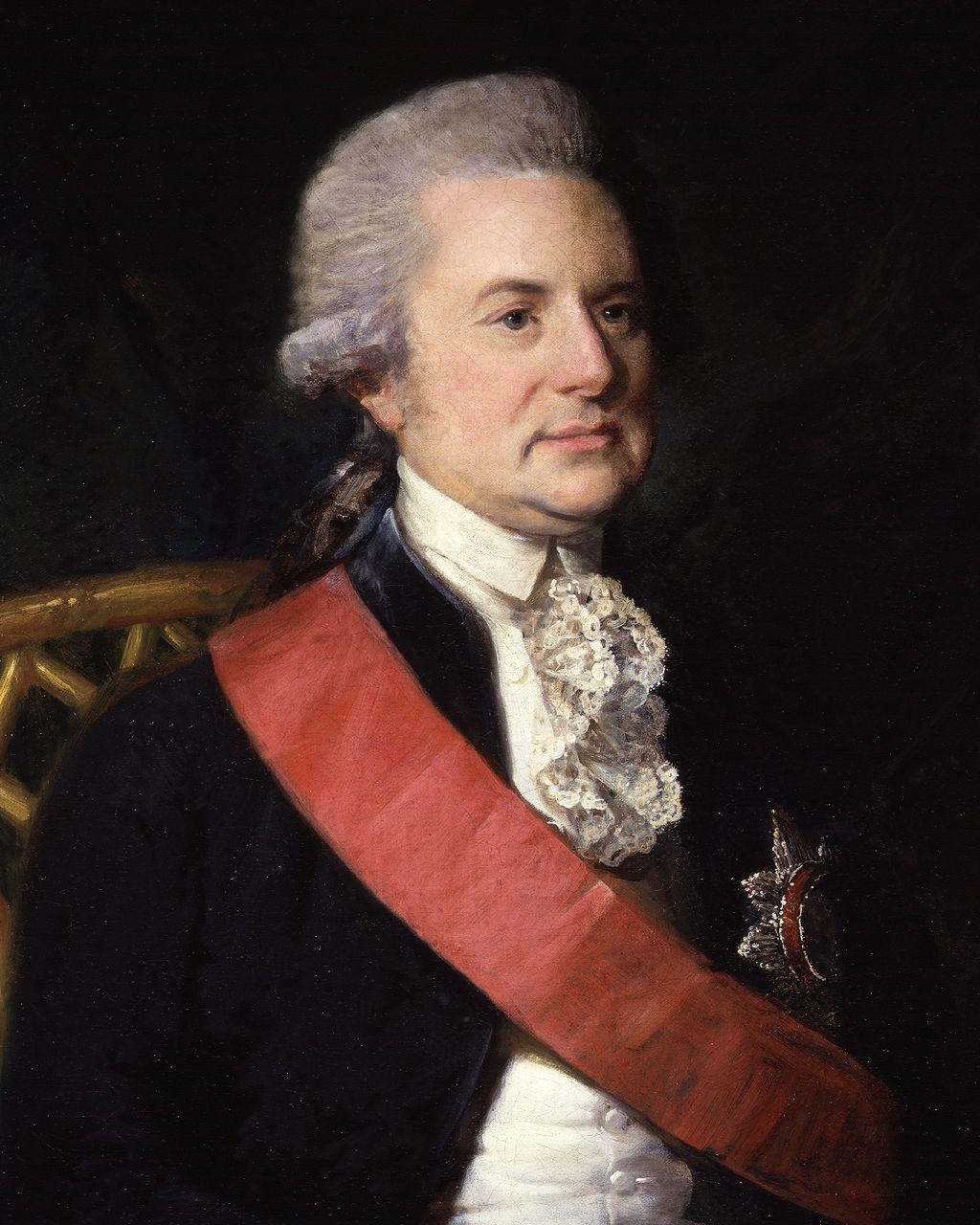
- Portrait by Lemuel Francis Abbott

Governor of Grenada
- In office 1776–1779
- Monarch: George III
- Preceded by: Sir William Young
- Succeeded by: Jean-François, comte de Durat

Governor of Madras
- In office 22 June 1781 – 14 June 1785
- Monarch: George III
- Preceded by: Sir Thomas Rumbold
- Succeeded by: Sir Archibald Campbell

Governor of the Cape Colony
- In office 1797–1798
- Monarch: George III
- Preceded by: Abraham Josias Sluysken
- Succeeded by: Francis Dundas

Personal details
- Born: 14 May 1737 Loughguile, County Antrim, Ireland
- Died: 31 May 1806 (aged 69) Chiswick, Middlesex, England, United Kingdom
- Education: Trinity College Dublin

George Macartney should not be confused with Sir George Macartney, a later British statesman.

George Macartney, 1st Earl Macartney, KB, PC (Ire) (14 May 1737 – 31 May 1806) was a British diplomat, politician and colonial administrator who served as the governor of Grenada, Madras and the Cape Colony. He is often remembered for his observation following Britain's victory in the Seven Years' War and subsequent territorial expansion at the Treaty of Paris that Britain now controlled "a vast Empire, on which the sun never sets" as well as his mission to China in 1793.

== Early years ==
He was born in 1737 as the only son of George Macartney, High Sheriff of Antrim and Elizabeth Winder. Macartney descended from a Scottish family with origins in Ireland, who were granted land in Scotland for serving under Edward Bruce, brother of Robert the Bruce. The Macartneys of Auchenleck, Kirkcudbrightshire settled in Lissanoure County Antrim, Ireland, where he was born.

After graduating from Trinity College Dublin, in 1759, he became a student of the Temple, London. Through Stephen Fox, elder brother of Charles James Fox, he was taken up by Lord Holland.

Appointed envoy extraordinary to Russia in 1764, he succeeded in negotiating an alliance between Great Britain and Russia with Catherine II. In 1768, he returned to the Irish House of Commons as a Member of Parliament for Armagh Borough, in order to discharge the duties of Chief Secretary for Ireland. On resigning this office, he was knighted.

In 1775, he became governor of the British West Indies and was created Baron Macartney in the Peerage of Ireland in 1776. He was elected to a seat in the British parliament (Bere Alston) from 1780 to 1781.

== Grenada ==
Macartney was the governor of Grenada from 1776 to 1779. During his governance, the island was attacked in July 1779, by the French royal fleet of the Comte d'Estaing.

After losing control of the fortifications on Hospital Hill — an essential defence position located on a prominence overlooking the island capital St. George's—Macartney chose to surrender unconditionally and was taken prisoner to France.

== Madras ==
Macartney was the governor of Madras (now known as Chennai) from 1781 to 1785. During his tenure as governor, renovation and strengthening of the walls of Fort St. George was commenced after the siege by Thomas Lally, and completed in 1783. It was also during this time that most of the buildings and barracks in the western portion of the Fort were erected. The Palace Street, the Arsenal, the Hanover square and the Western Barracks were constructed during this time. The streets on the eastern side of the Fort were also altered.

It was also during this time that idea of a police force for Madras was thought of. Stephen Popham, another British resident and the developer of Pophams Broadway, submitted a plan to Macartney for the establishment of a regular police force for Madras and for the building of direct and cross drains in every street. Popham also advocated measures for the naming and lighting of streets, for the regular registration of births and deaths and for the licensing of liquor, arrack and toddy shops. A Board of Police assisted by a Kotwal was subsequently formed. The Kotwal was to be the officer of the markets under the Superintendent of Police.

He negotiated the Treaty of Mangalore which brought an end to the Second Anglo-Mysore War in 1784. Macartney declined the governor-generalship of India—then the British territories administered by the British East India Company—and returned to Britain in 1786.

== Ambassador to China ==
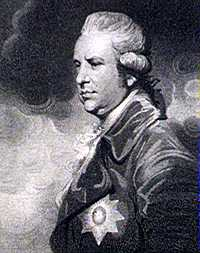
Lord Macartney

After being created Earl Macartney in the Irish peerage in 1792, he was appointed the first envoy of Britain to Qing China, after the failure of a number of previous embassies, including Cathcart's. He led the Macartney Embassy to Beijing in 1792, with a large British delegation on board a 64-gun man-of-war, HMS Lion under the command of Captain Sir Erasmus Gower. The embassy was ultimately not successful in its primary aim to open trade with China, although numerous secondary purposes were attained, including a first-hand assessment of the strength of the Chinese empire.

The failure to obtain trade concessions was not due to Macartney's refusal to kowtow in the presence of the Qianlong Emperor, as is commonly believed. It is more likely that the Chinese hegemony of east Asian states meant that China was used to having other states come and offer vassalage. In comparison, the European states were used to the order that came out of the Peace of Westphalia. Under that order, all states were formally treated as equals. For this reason, Macartney was negotiating as an equal in the European style, while the Qianlong Emperor was used to conducting diplomacy under Chinese hegemony.

After the conclusion of the embassy, the Qianlong Emperor sent a letter to King George III, explaining in greater depth the reasons for his refusal to grant the requests of the embassy. The Macartney Embassy is historically significant because it marked a missed opportunity by the Chinese to move toward some kind of accommodation with the West. This failure would continue to plague China as it encountered increasing foreign pressures and internal unrest during the 19th century.

The policies of the Thirteen Factories remained. The embassy returned to Britain in 1794 without obtaining any concession from China. However, the mission could be construed as a success because it brought back detailed observations. Sir George Staunton was charged with producing the official account of the expedition after their return. This multi-volume work was taken chiefly from the papers of Lord Macartney and from the papers of Sir Erasmus Gower, who was Commander of the expedition. Gower also left a more personal record through his private letters to Admiral John Elliot and Captain Sir Henry Martin, 1st Baronet (Comptroller of the Navy). Joseph Banks, the President of the Royal Society, was responsible for selecting and arranging engraving of the illustrations in this official record.

Macartney was expected to lead an embassy to Japan after he completed his mission to China, but his hopes of being able to proceed to Japan were ended by the confirmation when he returned to Canton of news of the outbreak of war with France and consequently of the vulnerability of his ships to attack by French cruisers operating from Batavia. On 23 December, Macartney recorded in his journal: "I have given up my projected visit to Japan, which (though now less alluring in prospect) has always been with me a favourite adventure as a possible opening of a new mine for the exercise of our industry and the purchase of our manufactures".

== Later life ==
On his return from a confidential mission to Italy in 1795, he was raised to the British peerage as Baron Macartney, of Parkhurst in the County of Surrey and Auchinleck in the Stewartry of Kirkcudbright, and at the end of 1796 was appointed governor of the newly acquired territory of the Cape Colony, where he remained until ill health compelled him to resign in November 1798.

In early 1797, he was requested to assist with the proposed plan to send an attacking force from the Cape under Major-General J. H. Craig to the South West coast of Spanish America by way of the British colony in New South Wales.

He died at Chiswick, Middlesex, on 31 May 1806, the title becoming extinct. After the death of his widow (Lady Jane Stuart, daughter of the 3rd Earl of Bute; they were married in 1768), his property passed to his niece, whose son took the name.

== Coat of arms ==
Coat of arms of George Macartney, 1st Earl Macartney
| Coronet A coronet of an Earl Crest A hand holding a slip of a rose tree with three roses thereon all proper. Escutcheon Or, a stag trippant gules attired argent a border of the second. Motto Mens conscia recti. |

== See also ==
- Isaac Titsingh, the ambassador who represented the Netherlands and VOC to greet Qianlong Emperor
- William Pitt Amherst, 1st Earl Amherst
- Andreas Everardus van Braam Houckgeest
- Halliday Macartney – a descendant of the Macartney family who served in China under Charles Gordon during the Taiping Rebellion

== References and further reading ==
- Barrow, John. (1807). Some Account of the Public Life, and a Selection from the Unpublished Writings, of the Earl of Macartney, 2 vols. London: T. Cadell and W. Davies.
- Cranmer-Byng, J. L. "Lord Macartney’s Embassy to Peking in 1793." Journal of Oriental Studies. Vol. 4, Nos. 1,2 (1957–58): 117–187.
- Esherick, Joseph W. "Cherishing Sources from Afar." Modern China Vol. 24, No. 2 (1998): 135–61.
- Hevia, James Louis. (1995). Cherishing Men from Afar: Qing Guest Ritual and the Macartney Embassy of 1793. Durham: Duke University Press. ISBN 978-0-8223-1637-4
- Hibbert, Christopher. The Dragon Wakes. China and the West, 1793–1911 (1970) online free to borrow
- Jacques, Martin. (2009). When China Rules the World: the End of the Western World and the Birth of a New Global Order. New York: Penguin Press. ISBN 9781594201851; OCLC 423217571
- Peyrefitte, Alain. (1992). The Immobile Empire (Jon Rotschild, translator). New York: Alfred A. Knopf/Random House. ISBN 978-0-394-58654-0
  - Peyrefitte, Alain. (1990). Images de l'Empire immobile ou le choc des mondes. Récit historique. Paris: Fayard. ISBN 978-2-213-02383-0
- Reddaway, W. F. "Macartney in Russia, 1765–67." Cambridge Historical Journal 3#3 (1931), pp. 260–294. online
- Robbins, Helen Henrietta Macartney (1908). Our First Ambassador to China: An Account of the Life of George, Earl of Macartney with Extracts from His Letters, and the Narrative of His Experiences in China, as Told by Himself, 1737–1806, from Hitherto Unpublished Correspondence and Documents. London : John Murray. Digitized by University of Hong Kong Libraries, Digital Initiatives, "China Through Western Eyes."; review in The Athenaeum
- Rockhill, William Woodville. "Diplomatic Missions to the Court of China: The Kotow Question I," The American Historical Review, Vol. 2, No. 3 (Apr. 1897), pp. 427–442.
- Rockhill, William Woodville. "Diplomatic Missions to the Court of China: The Kotow Question II," The American Historical Review, Vol. 2, No. 4 (Jul. 1897), pp. 627–643.
- Staunton, George Leonard. (1797). An Authentic Account of and Embassy from the King of Great Britain to the Emperor of China, 3 vols. London: G. Nichol.
- Turnbull, Patrick. Warren Hastings. New English Library, 1975.

Political offices
| Preceded by The Lord Frederick Campbell | Chief Secretary for Ireland; 1769–1772 | Succeeded by Sir John Blaquiere |
Government offices
| Preceded by William Young | Governor of Grenada; 1776–1779 | Succeeded by Jean-François, comte de Durat as Governor-General of Grenada |
| New creation | Governor of the Cape Colony; 1797–1798 | Succeeded by Francis Dundas, acting |
Parliament of Ireland
| Preceded by Robert Cuninghame; Hon. Barry Maxwell | Member of Parliament for Armagh Borough; 1768–1776; With: Philip Tisdall 1768–1769; Charles O'Hara 1769–1776 | Succeeded by Philip Tisdall; Henry Meredyth |
Parliament of Great Britain
| Preceded by Sir John Mordaunt; John Elliot | Member of Parliament for Cockermouth; 1768–1769; With: Charles Jenkinson (1768); George Johnstone (1768–1769) | Succeeded by George Johnstone; Sir James Lowther |
| Preceded by James Archibald Stuart | Member of Parliament for Ayr Burghs; 1774–1776 | Succeeded by Frederick Stuart |
| Preceded by Sir Francis Henry Drake; Hon. George Hobart | Member of Parliament for Bere Alston; 1780–1781; With: Lord Algernon Percy (1780); Viscount Feilding (1781) | Succeeded by Viscount Feilding; Laurence Cox |
Diplomatic posts
| Preceded by The Earl of Buckinghamshire | Ambassador from Great Britain to Russia; 1764–1766 | Succeeded by Hans Stanley |
| Preceded by Hans Stanley | Ambassador from Great Britain to Russia; 1767–1768 | Succeeded by The Lord Cathcart |
| Preceded by | Ambassador from Great Britain to China; 1792–1794 | Succeeded by George Elliot |
