= William Stuart (bishop) =

Irish bishop

The Right Reverend and Right Honourable William Stuart PC (Ire)
- Archbishop of Armagh; Primate of All Ireland
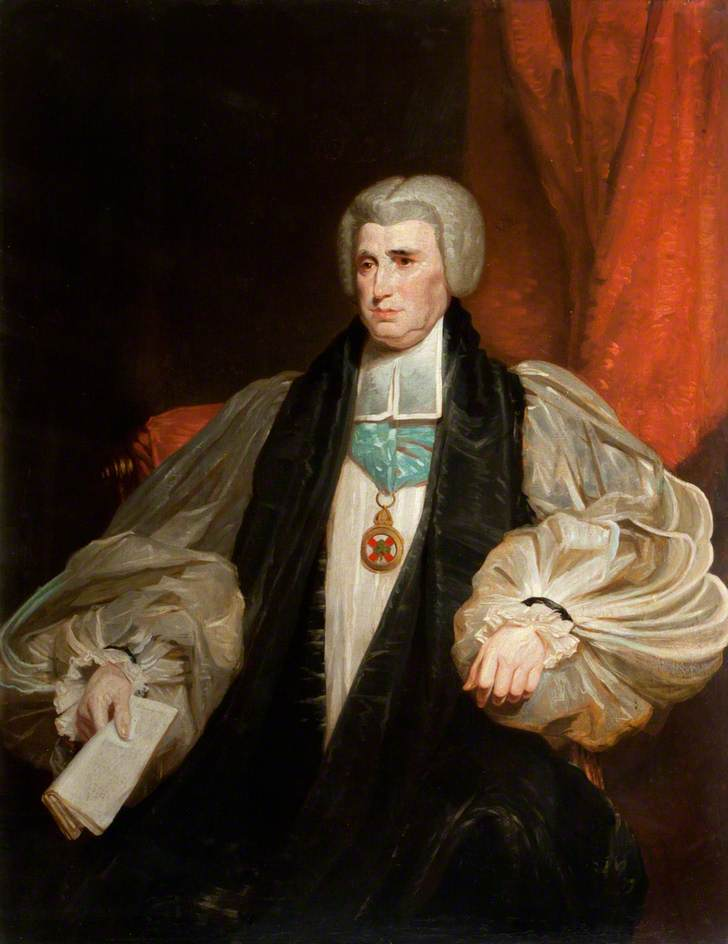
- Church: Church of Ireland
- Province: Armagh
- Diocese: Armagh
- In office: 1800–1822
- Predecessor: William Newcome
- Successor: Lord John Beresford
- Previous post: Bishop of St Davids (1794–1800)

Orders
- Ordination: 1779
- Consecration: 12 January 1794 by John Moore

Personal details
- Born: 15 March 1755 Dublin, Ireland
- Died: 6 May 1822 (aged 67) London, England
- Buried: Luton Hoo, England
- Denomination: Anglican
- Parents: John Stuart, 3rd Earl of Bute & Mary Wortley-Montagu
- Spouse: Sophia Penn
- Children: 3, including William and Henry
- Education: Winchester College
- Alma mater: St John's College, Cambridge

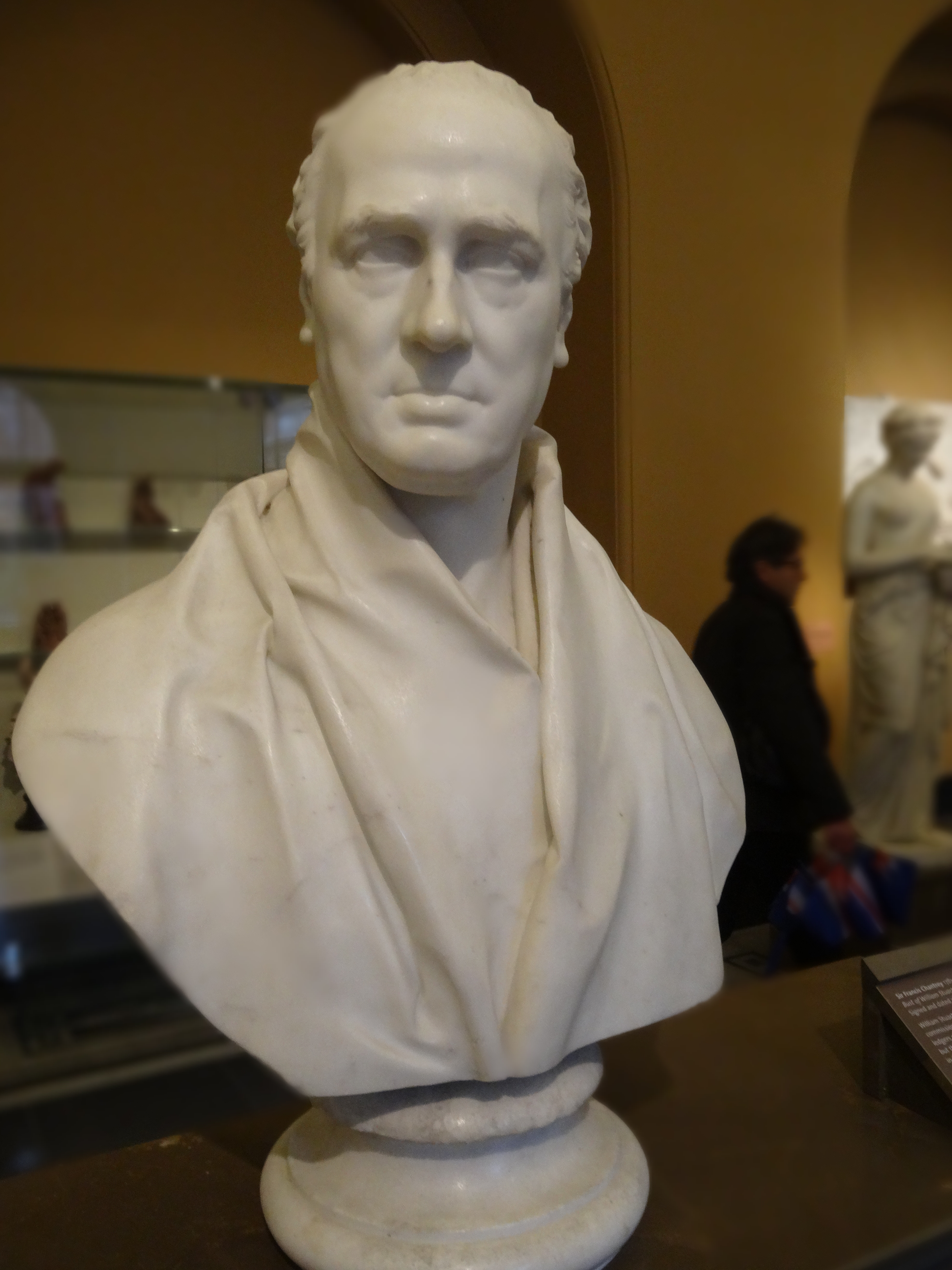
Archbishop William Stuart sculpted by Francis Chantrey.

William Stuart PC (15 March 1755 – 6 May 1822) was an Anglican prelate who served as the Bishop of St David's in Wales from 1794 to 1800 and then Archbishop of Armagh in Ireland from 1800 until his death.

== Family life ==
Stuart was the son of John Stuart, 3rd Earl of Bute (Prime Minister of Great Britain 1762–1763) and Mary Wortley-Montagu. There is a painting in the Tate Gallery in London of him aged 12 stealing eggs and chicks from a bird's nest.

He was educated at Winchester College and St John's College, Cambridge.

On 3 May 1796, William married Sophia Penn, daughter of Thomas Penn, and had three children:

- Mary Juliana Stuart (died 11 July 1866) married Thomas Knox, 2nd Earl of Ranfurly.
- Sir William Stuart (31 October 1798 - 7 July 1874) married firstly Henrietta Mariah Sarah, daughter of Admiral Sir Charles Pole, 1st Baronet, and married secondly Georgiana, daughter of General Frederick Nathaniel Walker.
- Henry Stuart, MP (5 April 1804 – 26 October 1854)

== Episcopal ministry ==
In 1793 he was appointed Canon of the fourth stall at St George's Chapel, Windsor Castle, a position he held until 1800.

He was consecrated Bishop of St David's on 12 January 1794. Six years later, he was nominated Archbishop of Armagh on 30 October 1800 and appointed by letters patent on 22 November 1800.

== Death ==
He died in London on 6 May 1822, aged 67, as a result of having accidentally taken an improper medicine.

He was buried at his family's seat, Luton Hoo in Bedfordshire.

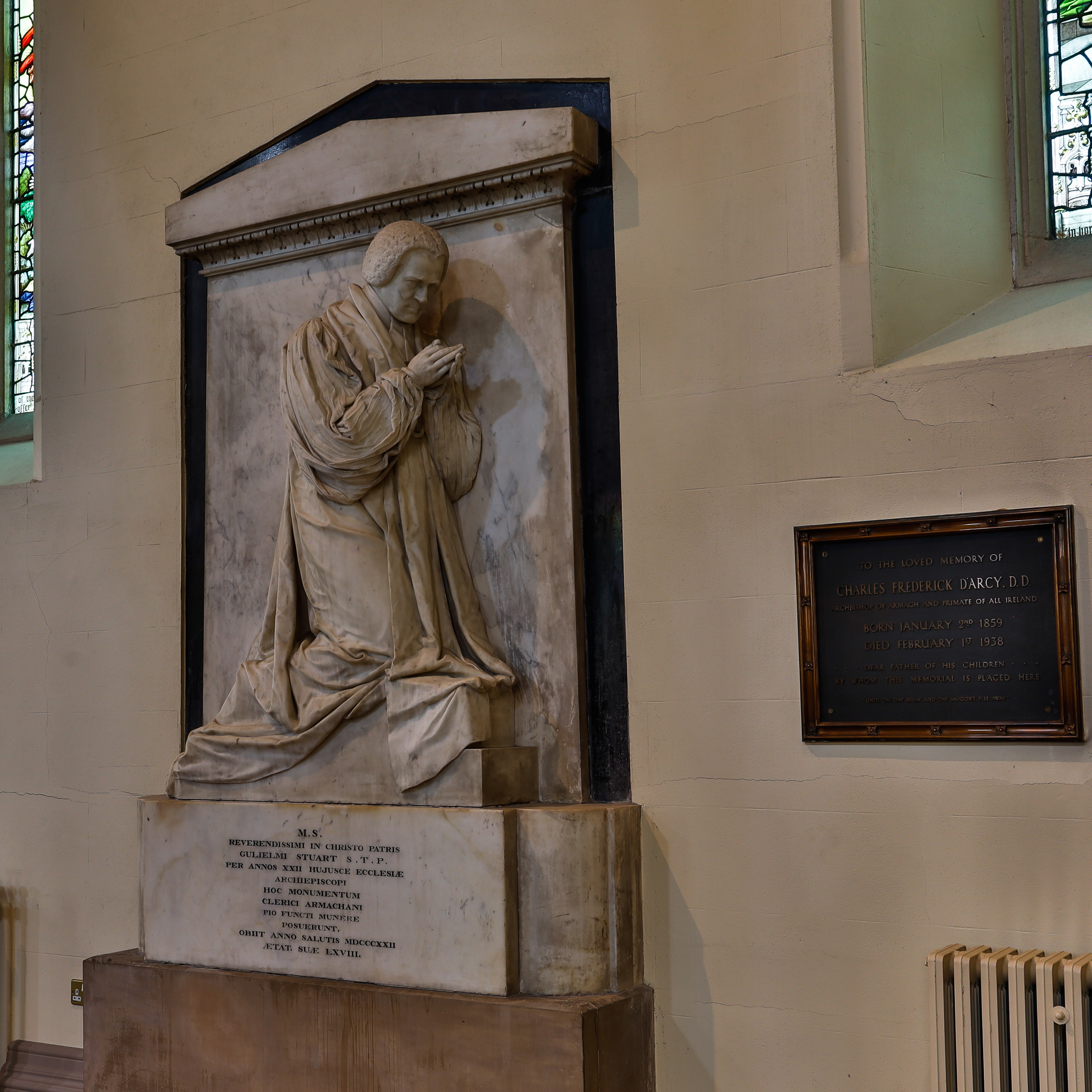
Sculpture in the north aisle of St Patrick's Cathedral, Armagh

In St Patrick's Anglican Cathedral in Armagh there is a life-size bas-relief marble figure of the Archbishop in the attitude of prayer, sculpted by Sir Francis Chantrey. Beneath it is the following Latin inscription:

M. S. / Reverendissimi in Christo patris / GULIELMI STUART, S T P. / per annos xxii hujusce Ecclesiæ / Archiepiscopi. / Hoc monumentum / Clerici Armachani / pio functi munere / posuerunt. / Obiit anno salutis MDCCCXXII / Ætat. Suæ Ixviii.
In sacred memory of the most reverend father in Christ, William Stuart STP, for 22 years archbishop of this church. The clergy of Armagh, making a pious offering, placed this monument. He died in the year of grace 1822, in the 68th year of his age.

== Arms ==
Coat of arms of William Stuart

Notes
While serving as a bishop Stuart's arms would be displayed impaled with the arms of the diocese and topped by a mitre.
Escutcheon
Or a fess chequy Azure and Argent within a double tressure flory and counterflory of fleurs-de-lys Gules.

Church of England titles
| Preceded by Samuel Horsley | Bishop of St David's; 1794–1800 | Succeeded by Lord George Murray |
Church of Ireland titles
| Preceded by William Newcome | Archbishop of Armagh; 1800–1822 | Succeeded by Lord John Beresford |
