= John Stuart, 3rd Earl of Bute =

Prime Minister of Great Britain from 1762 to 1763

The Right Honourable The Earl of Bute KG PC FSA Scot
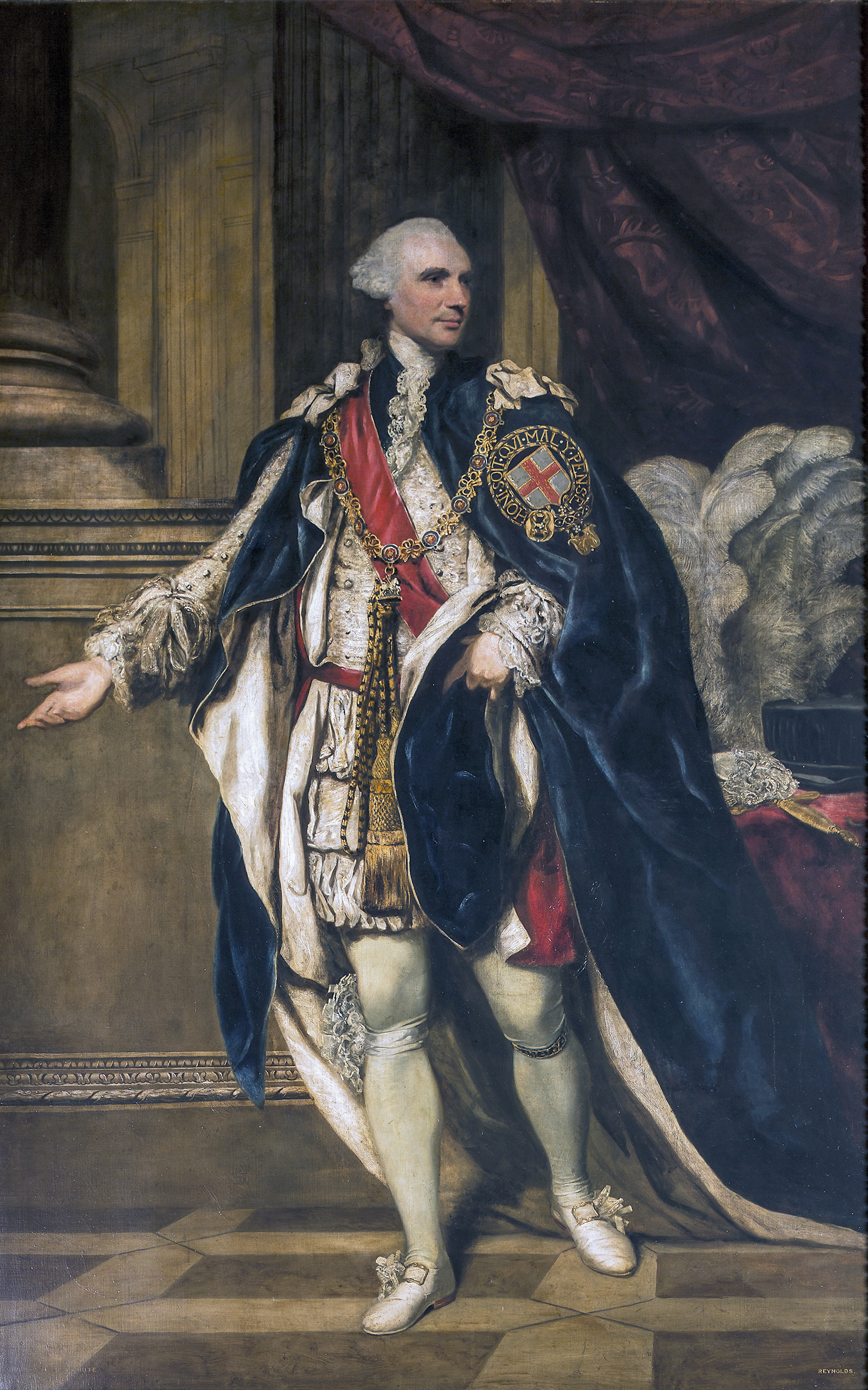
- Portrait of the Earl of Bute by Sir Joshua Reynolds, 1773

Prime Minister of Great Britain
- In office 26 May 1762 – 8 April 1763
- Monarch: George III
- Preceded by: The Duke of Newcastle
- Succeeded by: George Grenville

Secretary of State for the Northern Department
- In office 25 March 1761 – 27 May 1762
- Monarch: George III
- Prime Minister: The Duke of Newcastle
- Preceded by: The Earl of Holderness
- Succeeded by: George Grenville

Personal details
- Born: John Stuart; 25 May 1713 Edinburgh, Scotland
- Died: 10 March 1792 (aged 78) Westminster, England
- Resting place: St Mary's Chapel, Rothesay, Isle of Bute, Scotland
- Party: Tory
- Spouse: Mary Wortley Montagu (m. 1736)
- Children: 11; including John, James, Charles, William and Louisa
- Parent: James Stuart, 2nd Earl of Bute (father)
- Education: Leiden University; University of Groningen; Eton College

John Stuart, 3rd Earl of Bute (/bjuːt/; 25 May 1713 – 10 March 1792), styled Lord Mount Stuart between 1713 and 1723, was a British Tory statesman who served as the Prime Minister of Great Britain from 1762 to 1763 under George III. He became the first Tory to hold the position and was arguably the last important royal favourite in British politics. He was the first prime minister from Scotland following the Acts of Union in 1707. He was also elected as the first president of the Society of Antiquaries of Scotland when it was founded in 1780.

== Early life ==
=== Family ===
He was born in Parliament Close, near to St Giles Cathedral on the Royal Mile in Edinburgh on 25 May 1713, the son of James Stuart, 2nd Earl of Bute, and his wife, Lady Anne Campbell. He attended Eton College from 1724 to 1730. He went on to study civil law at the Universities of Groningen (1730–1732) and Leiden (1732–1734) in the Netherlands, graduating from the latter with a degree in civil law.

A close relative of the Clan Campbell (his mother was a daughter of the 1st Duke of Argyll), Bute succeeded to the Earldom of Bute (named after the Isle of Bute) upon the death of his father in 1723. He was brought up thereafter by his maternal uncles, the 2nd Duke of Argyll and Archibald Campbell, 1st Earl of Ilay. In August 1735, he eloped with Mary Wortley Montagu, whose parents Sir Edward and Lady Mary Wortley Montagu were slow to consent to the marriage.

== Political career ==
=== Rise to prominence ===
In 1737, he was elected a Scottish representative peer; despite being in London in December of that year, he did not participate in deliberations in the House of Lords. Because of his support for Argyll against Walpole, he was not re-elected in 1741. For the next several years he retired to his estates in Scotland to manage his affairs and indulge his interest in botany.

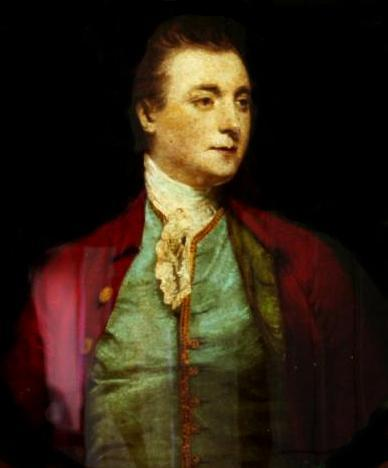
Bute (1770)

In 1745, Bute moved to Twickenham, Middlesex, where his family rented a house for only forty-five pounds a year (equivalent to £9,229 in 2025). He met Frederick, Prince of Wales, in 1747 at the Egham Races and became a close friend.

After the Prince's death in 1751, Bute was appointed tutor to George, Prince of Wales.

Bute arranged for the Prince and his brother Prince Edward to follow a course of lectures on natural philosophy by the itinerant lecturer Stephen Demainbray. This led to an interest in natural philosophy on the part of the young prince and may have led to George III's collection of natural philosophical instruments.

Bute furthermore became close to Prince Frederick's widow, Augusta of Saxe-Gotha, the Dowager Princess of Wales, and it was rumoured that the couple were having an affair. Indeed, one of the Prince of Wales's associates, John Horne Tooke, published a scandalous pamphlet alluding to the liaison, but the rumours were almost certainly untrue, since Bute held sincere religious beliefs against adultery and, by all indications, appeared happily married.

In 1780, Bute was elected as the first President of the Society of Antiquaries of Scotland.

== Prime Minister (1760-1763) ==
=== Appointment ===
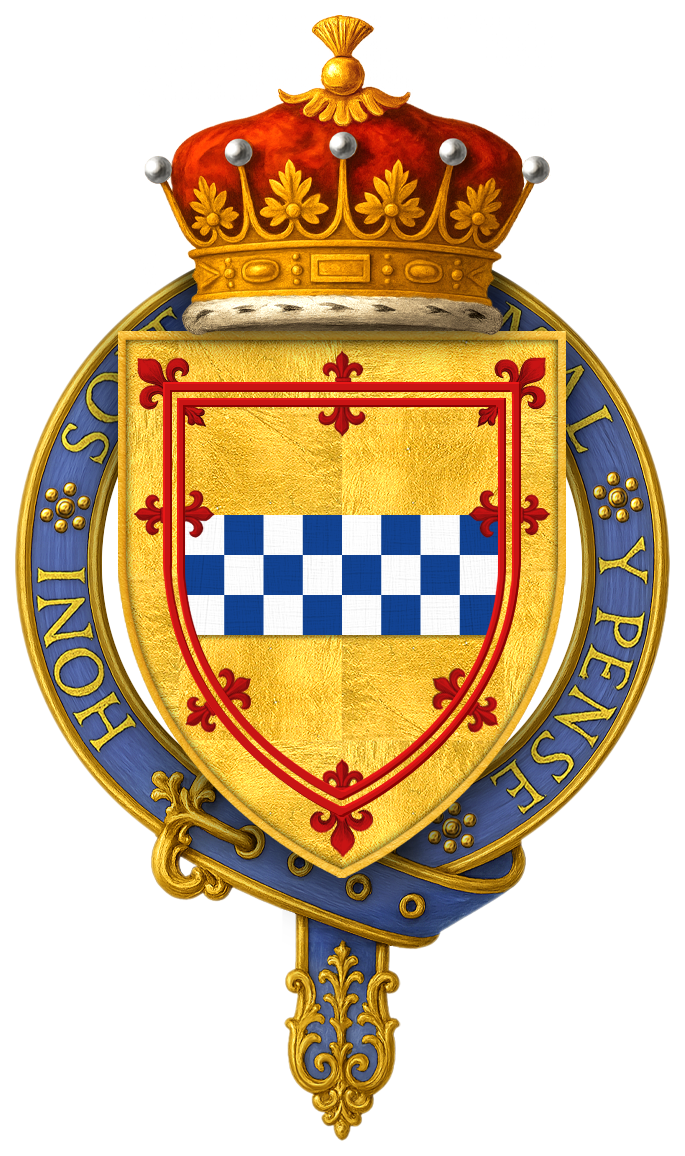
Coat of arms of John Stuart, 3rd Earl of Bute, KG

Because of the influence he had over his pupil, Bute expected to rise quickly to political power following George's accession to the throne in 1760, but his plans were premature. It would first be necessary to remove both the incumbent prime minister (the Duke of Newcastle) and arguably the even more powerful Secretary of State for the Southern Department (William Pitt the Elder). The Government of the day, buoyed by recent successes in the Seven Years' War, was popular, however, and did well at the 1761 British general election which, as was customary at the time, took place on the accession of the new monarch.

Supported by the King, Bute manoeuvred himself into power by first allying himself with Newcastle against Pitt over the latter's desire to declare war on Spain. Once thwarted in his designs against Spain by Bute and Newcastle, Pitt resigned his post as Secretary of State for the Southern Department. Next, Bute forced Newcastle's resignation as prime minister when he found himself in a small minority within the government over the level of funding and direction of the Seven Years' War. Re-elected as a Scottish representative peer in 1760, Bute was appointed the de facto prime minister after the resignations of Pitt and Newcastle, thus ending a long period of Whig dominance.

The Anglo-Prussian Alliance, which was established in 1756 was dissolved in 1762. Frederick the Great accused Bute of a plot to destroy the Prussian monarchy.

Bute's premiership was notable for the negotiation of the Treaty of Paris (1763) which concluded the Seven Years' War. In so doing, Bute had to soften his previous stance in relation to concessions given to France in that he agreed that the important fisheries in Newfoundland be returned to France without Britain's possession of Guadeloupe in return.

After peace was concluded, Bute and the King decided that Britain's military expenditure should not exceed its prewar levels, but they thought a large presence was necessary in America to deal with the French and Spanish threat. They therefore charged the colonists for the increased military levels, thus catalysing the resistance to taxes which led to the American Revolution. Bute also introduced a cider tax of four shillings per hogshead in 1763 to help finance the Seven Years' War.

The journalist John Wilkes published a newspaper, The North Briton, in which both Bute and the Dowager Princess of Wales were savagely satirised. Bute resigned as prime minister shortly afterwards, although he remained in the House of Lords as a Scottish representative peer until 1780.

Bute's personal image during his premiership was plagued by widespread disapproval among colleagues and the public despite his successes in negotiating the Treaty of Paris and dismissing corrupt government officials, largely due to his Scottish heritage. Due to widespread Scottish distrust, the media fabricated rumours that he wanted to install a Jacobite monarchy despite his extremely close and amicable relationship with King George III.

== Post-premiership ==
For the remainder of his life, Bute remained at his estate in Hampshire, where he built himself a mansion called High Cliff near Christchurch. From there he continued his pursuit of botany and became a major literary and artistic patron. Among his beneficiaries were Samuel Johnson, Tobias Smollett, Robert Adam, William Robertson and John Hill. He also gave considerably to the Scottish universities, and served as chancellor of Marischal College from 1761.

He financed Alberto Fortis's travels into Dalmatia. His botanical work culminated in the publication of Botanical Tables Containing the Families of British Plants in 1785. Even after his retirement, Bute was accused by many Americans in the years leading up to the American Revolutionary War as having an undue corrupting influence over the British government.

He died at his home in South Audley Street, Grosvenor Square, Westminster, from complications of a fall suffered while staying at Highcliffe, and was buried at Rothesay on the Isle of Bute.

== Legacy ==
The flowering plant genera Butea and Stewartia are named after him.

In 1761, Bute was appointed Ranger of Richmond Park by King George III, a post he held until his death; Bute Avenue in Petersham near the park is named after him.

According to historian John Naish, the 18th-century expression "Jack Boot" meaning a stupid person originated as disparagement of Stuart's performance as prime minister.

Stuart Island (British Columbia) is named for Stuart.

== Luton Hoo ==
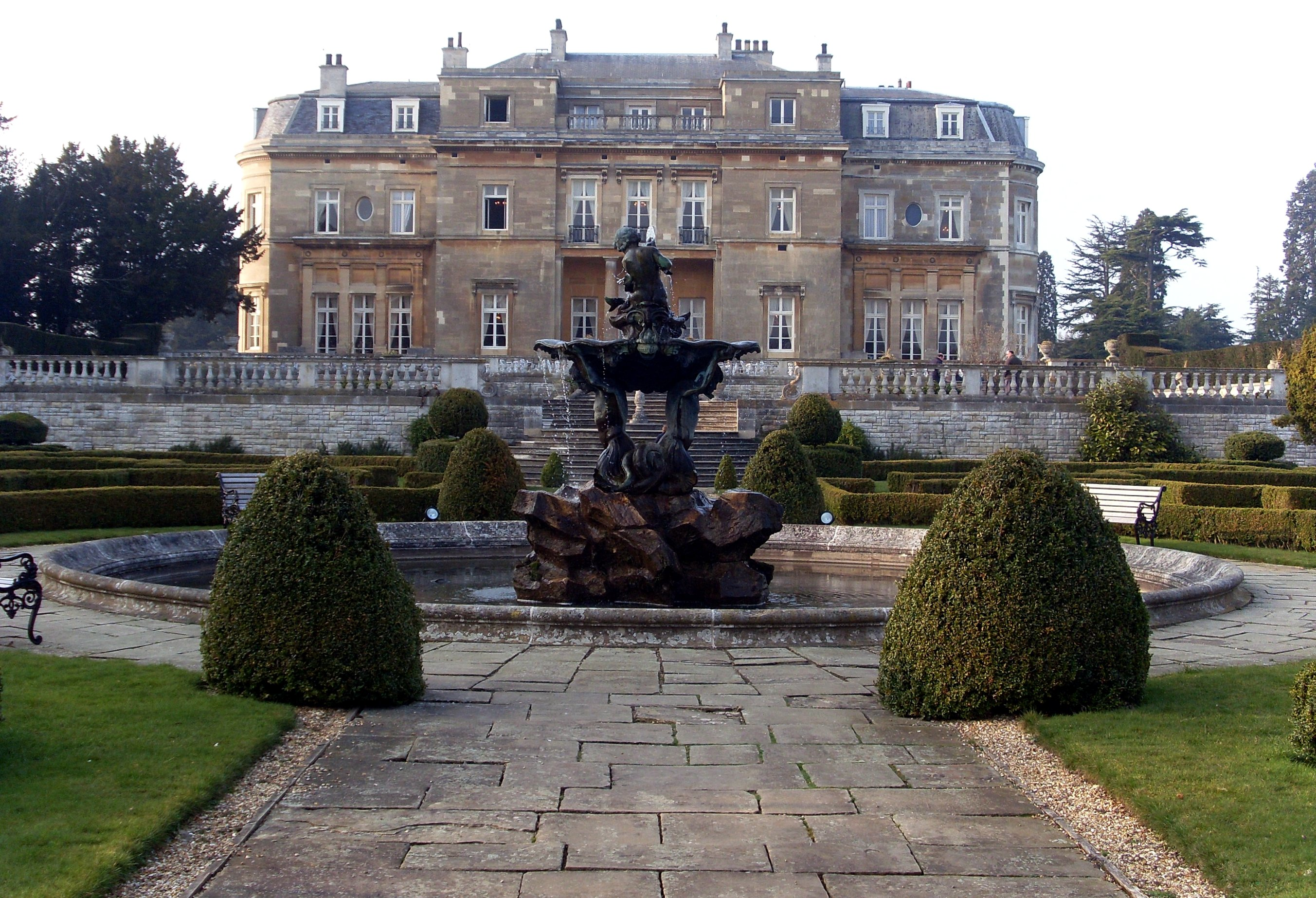
Luton Hoo mansion in 2009

Bute purchased Luton Hoo, or Luton Park, from Francis Herne MP in 1763 for the sum of £94,700. Recognising that the existing buildings were unsuitable, Bute commissioned the neoclassical architect Robert Adam to oversee the redesign of the estate house.

Initial designs were unsatisfactory and, coupled with the sale of Bute House, Adams submitted new designs for a larger complex, which Bute further adjusted to include five book rooms and seven water closets. The building also housed an extensive art collection, particularly paintings of the Dutch and Flemish schools. A fire in March 1771 "did considerable damage" according to contemporary reports. The project was completed by 1773 but not according to the full plan, the second phase of which was abandoned.

== Death ==
He died on 10 March 1792, from a fall he had a year and a half prior. He fell 30 feet (9.1 m) down cliffs in Hampshire while collecting plants. He died in his mansion on South Audley Street off Grosvenor Square.

== Family ==
In 1736 he married Mary Wortley Montagu, daughter of diplomat Edward Wortley Montagu and his wife Lady Mary Wortley Montagu. They had at least eleven children:

1. Lady Mary Stuart (c. 1741 – 5 April 1824), married James Lowther, later created Earl of Lonsdale, on 7 September 1761
2. John Stuart, Lord Mount Stuart (30 June 1744 – 16 November 1814), politician who succeeded as 4th Earl of Bute and was later created Marquess of Bute
3. Lady Anne Stuart (born c. 1745), married Hugh Percy, Lord Warkworth, later the 2nd Duke of Northumberland, on 2 July 1764
4. The Hon. James Archibald Stuart (21 September 1747 – 1 March 1818), politician and author, ancestor of Bear Grylls.
5. Lady Augusta Stuart (c. 1748 – 12 February 1778), married Andrew Corbett, Captain in the Blue.
6. Lady Jane Stuart (c. 1748 – 28 February 1828), married George Macartney, later created Earl Macartney, on 1 February 1768
7. The Hon. Frederick Stuart (1751–1802), politician
8. The Hon. Charles Stuart (January 1753 – 25 May 1801), soldier and politician
9. The Hon. William Stuart (March 1755 – 6 March 1822), Anglican prelate who served as Archbishop of Armagh
10. Lady Caroline Stuart (before 1763 – 20 January 1813), married The Hon John Dawson, later the 1st Earl of Portarlington, on 1 January 1778
11. Lady Louisa Stuart (12 August 1757 – 4 August 1851), writer, who died unmarried

== Arms ==
Coat of arms of John Stuart, 3rd Earl of Bute
| Crest A demi-lion gules. Escutcheon Or, a fess chequey argent and azure within a double tressure flory counter-flory gules. Supporters Dexter, A horse argent bridled gules; Sinister, A stag proper. Motto Avito viret honore (He flourishes by ancestral honours). Orders The Most Noble Order of the Garter – Knight Companion (KG). |

== Gallery ==
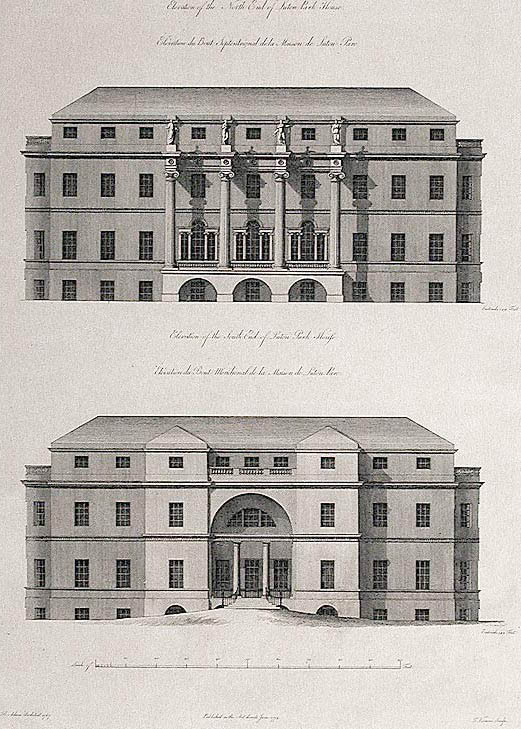
The north and south fronts of Luton Hoo as designed by Robert Adam

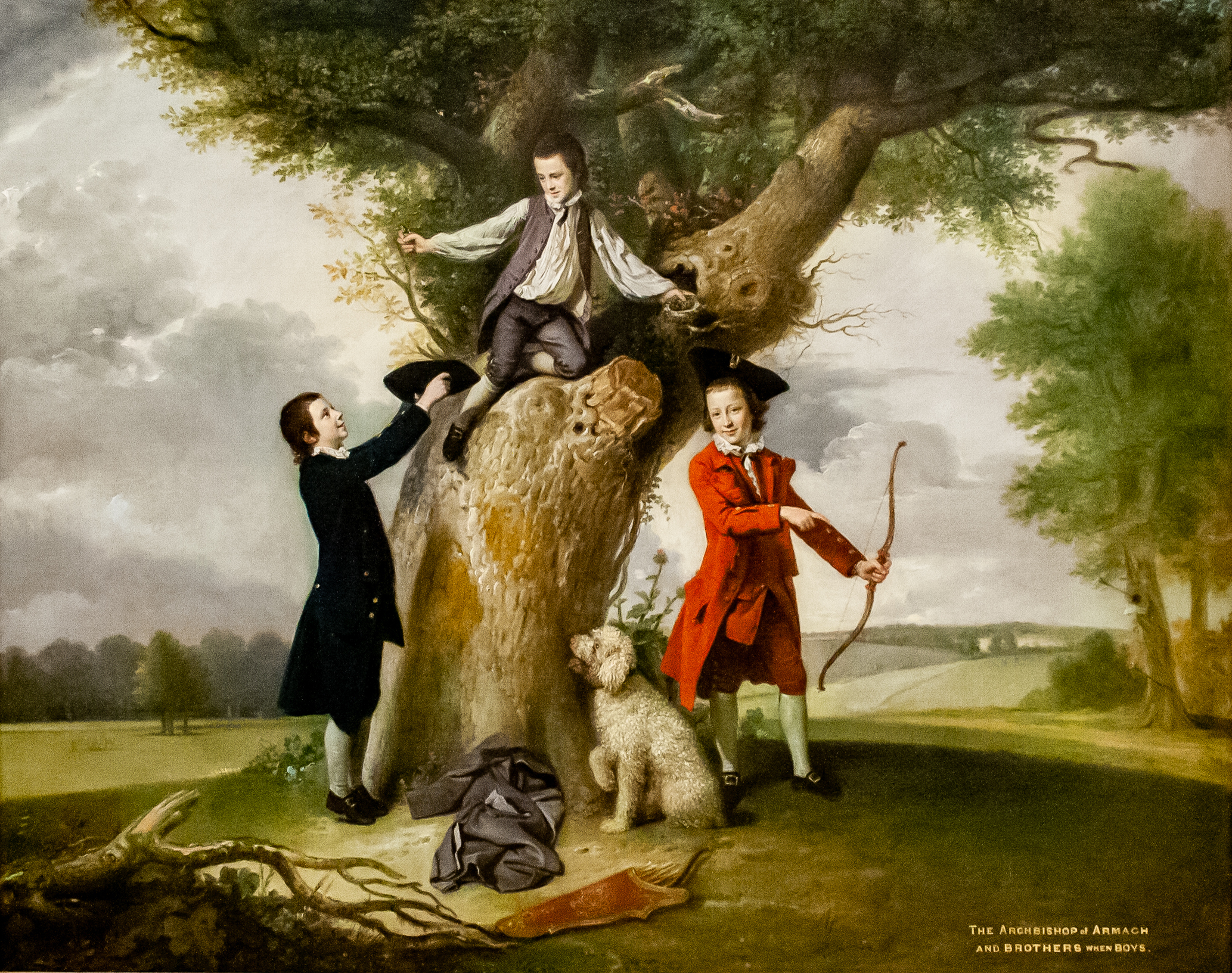
The Three Sons of the Earl of Bute by Johann Zoffany, 1764

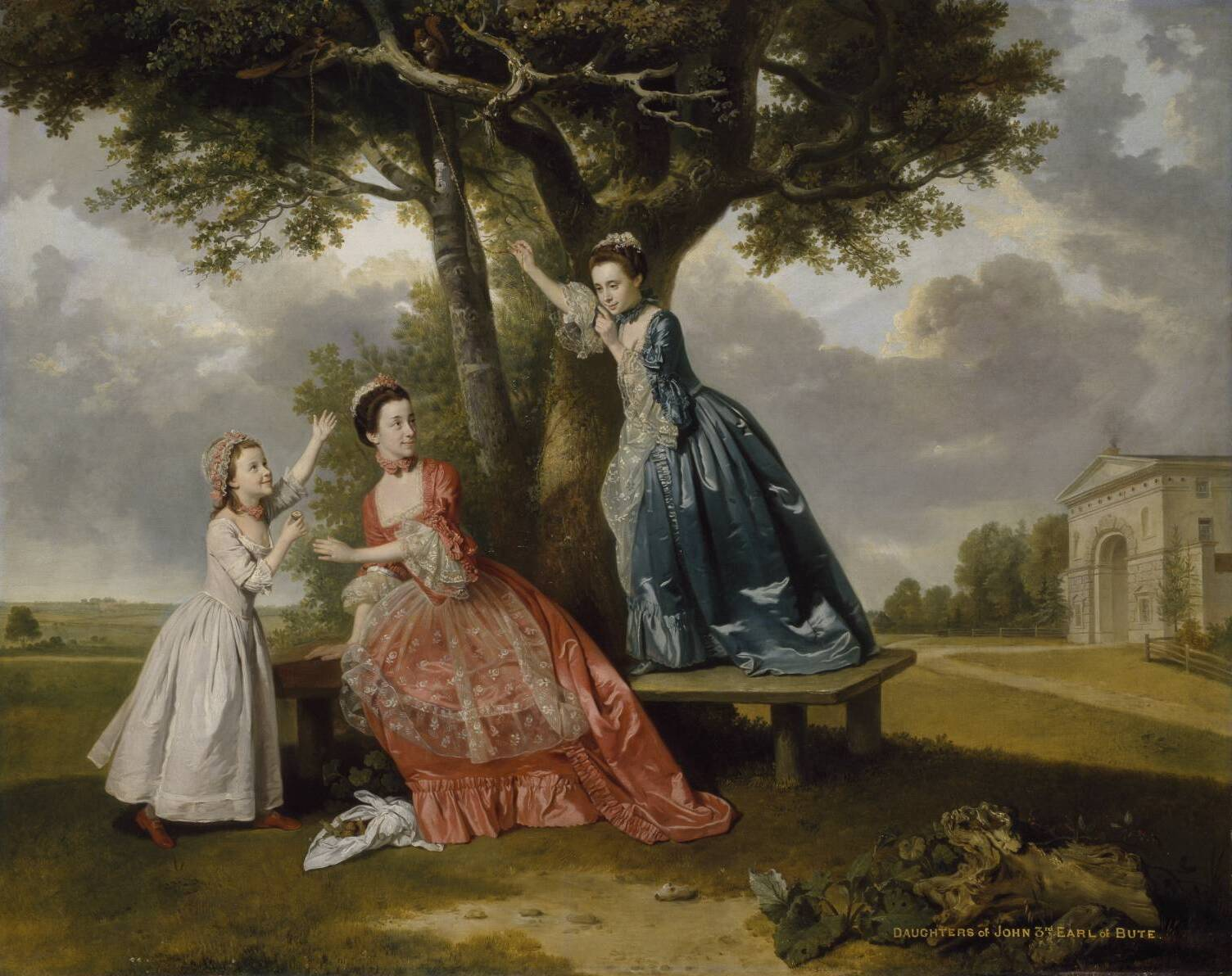
The Three Daughters of the Earl of Bute

Political offices
| Preceded by The Earl of Holderness | Secretary of State for the Northern Department; 1761–1762 | Succeeded by George Grenville |
| Preceded by The Duke of Newcastle | Prime Minister of Great Britain; 26 May 1762 – 8 April 1763 | Succeeded by George Grenville |
| Preceded by The Duke of Newcastle | First Lord of the Treasury; 1762–1763 | Succeeded by George Grenville |
Court offices
| Preceded by Edward Finch | Keeper of the Privy Purse; 1760–1763 | Succeeded by William Breton |
Peerage of Scotland
| Preceded by James Stuart | Earl of Bute; 1723–1792 | Succeeded by John Stuart |
