= First day on the Somme =

Start of the Battle of Albert

- Part of the Battle of the Somme (First World War)
- Battle of the Somme, 1 July – 18 November 1916
Date	1 July 1916
Location	Somme, Picardy, France 50°00′56″N 02°41′51″E
Result	See the Aftermath section

Belligerents
British Empire; United Kingdom; Bermuda; Newfoundland; France	German Empire

Commanders and leaders
(United Kingdom of Great Britain and Ireland) Douglas Haig; Henry Rawlinson; (French Third Republic) Ferdinand Foch; Émile Fayolle	(German Empire) Fritz von Below

Strength
13 British divisions; 6 French divisions	6 divisions

Casualties and losses
British: 57,470 (19,240 killed); French: 1,590	6,226–12,000
- In the German ten-day casualty accounting period (10 tägigen Truppenkrankenrapporten) for 1 to 10 July, there were 46,319 casualties and 7,539 men reported sick.
- Somme is a department in northern France, of the Hauts-de-France region of France

The first day on the Somme (1 July 1916) was the beginning of the Battle of Albert (1–13 July) the name given by the British to the first two weeks of the Battle of the Somme (1 July–18 November) in the First World War. Nine corps of the French Sixth Army and the British Fourth and Third armies attacked the German 2nd Army (General Fritz von Below). The attack was from Foucaucourt south of the Somme, northwards across the Somme and the Ancre to Serre and Gommecourt, 2 mi (3.2 km) beyond, in the Third Army area. The objective of the attack was to capture the German first and second defensive positions from Serre south to the Albert–Bapaume road and the first position from the road south to Foucaucourt.

The German defence south of the road mostly collapsed and the French had complete success on both banks of the Somme, as did the British from Maricourt on the army boundary with the French northwards. XIII Corps took Montauban and reached all its objectives, XV Corps captured Mametz and isolated Fricourt. The III Corps attack on both sides of the Albert–Bapaume road was a disaster, making only a short advance south of La Boisselle, where the 34th Division suffered the most casualties of any Allied division on 1 July. Further north, X Corps captured part of the Leipzig redoubt (an earthwork fortification), failed opposite Thiepval and had a great but temporary success on the left flank, where the German front line was overrun and Schwaben and Stuff redoubts captured by the 36th (Ulster) Division.

German counter-attacks during the afternoon recaptured most of the lost ground north of the Albert–Bapaume road and more British attacks against Thiepval were costly failures. On the north bank of the Ancre, the attack of VIII Corps was another costly failure, with large numbers of British troops being shot down in no man's land. The VII Corps diversion at Gommecourt was also costly, with only a partial and temporary advance south of the village. The German defeats, from Foucaucourt to the Albert–Bapaume road, left the German defence on the south bank incapable of resisting another attack, A substantial German retreat began from the Flaucourt plateau to the west bank of the Somme close to Péronne. North of the Somme in the British area, Fricourt was abandoned by the Germans overnight.

Several truces were observed to recover wounded from no man's land on the British front; the Third Army diversion at Gommecourt cost 6,758 casualties against 1,212 German and the combined casualty count with the Fourth Army reached 57,470, (19,240 of which had been fatal). The French Sixth Army suffered 1,590 casualties and the German 2nd Army suffered 10,000–12,000 casualties. Orders were issued to the Anglo-French armies to continue the offensive on 2 July; a German counter-attack on the north bank of the Somme by the 12th Division, intended for the night of 1/2 July, took until dawn on 2 July to begin and was destroyed by the French and British troops opposite. Since 1 July 1916, the British casualties on the First Day and the "meagre gains" have been a source of grief and controversy in Britain.

== Background ==
=== Strategic developments ===
In July 1915, the French Commander in Chief Joseph Joffre held the first Allied conference at Chantilly. In December, a second conference agreed a strategy of simultaneous attacks by the French, Russian, British and Italian armies. The British theatre of operations was in northern France and Flanders but in February 1916, Haig accepted Joffre's plan for a combined attack astride the Somme river, around 1 July; in April, the British Cabinet agreed to an offensive in France. The nature of a joint offensive on the Somme began to change almost immediately, when the German army attacked Verdun on 21 February. In March, Foch proposed a Somme offensive on a 28 mi (45 km) front, between Lassigny and the Somme with 42 French divisions and a British attack on a 16 mi (25 km) front from the Somme to Thiepval with 25 divisions. French divisions intended for the joint offensive were soon diverted to Verdun and the offensive was eventually reduced to a main effort by the British and a supporting attack by the French Sixth Army.

==== BEF reinforcements ====
Bassin de la Somme

The Somme was to be the first mass offensive mounted by the British Expeditionary Force (BEF) and the first battle to involve a large number of New Army divisions, many composed of Pals battalions that had formed after Kitchener's call for volunteers in August 1914. By the end of the Gallipoli Campaign, twelve British divisions were in Egypt and from 4 February to 20 June, nine were transferred to France. From Britain and Egypt the 34th Division and 35th Division arrived in January, the 31st Division and the 46th (North Midland) Division in February, the 29th Division, 39th Division, 1st Australian Division and 2nd Australian Division in March, the New Zealand Division in April, the 41st Division, 61st (2nd South Midland) Division and 63rd (2nd Northumbrian) Division in May, the 40th Division, 60th (2/2nd London), 4th Australian and 5th Australian divisions in June and the 11th (Northern) Division on 3 July. The 55th (West Lancashire) Division and 56th (1/1st London) Division were reassembled, a battalion of the Newfoundland Regiment and the South African Brigade joined in April, followed by a contingent of the Bermuda Volunteer Rifle Corps in July.

Despite considerable debate among German staff officers, General Erich von Falkenhayn, the head of Oberste Heeresleitung (OHL, the supreme command of the German Army) insisted on a tactic of rigid defence of the front line in 1916 and implied after the war that the psychology of German soldiers, shortage of manpower and lack of reserves made the policy inescapable, since the troops necessary to seal off breakthroughs did not exist. High losses incurred in holding ground by a policy of no retreat were preferable to higher losses, voluntary withdrawals and the effect of a belief that soldiers had discretion to avoid battle. When a more flexible policy was substituted later, discretion was still reserved to army commanders. Despite the certainty by mid-June of an Anglo-French attack on the Somme against the 2nd Army, Falkenhayn sent only four divisions, keeping eight in the western strategic reserve. No divisions were moved from the 6th Army, despite it holding a shorter line with 17 1/2 divisions and three of the divisions in OHL reserve being in the 6th Army area. The maintenance of the strength of the 6th Army at the expense of the 2nd Army on the Somme, indicated that Falkenhayn intended a counter-offensive against the British to be made closer to Arras north of the Somme front, once the British offensive had been shattered.

=== Tactical developments ===
==== French ====
The offensives of 1915 showed that attacks would inevitably be slow and costly; on 8 January 1916, GQG issued "Instruction sur le combat offensif des petites unités" ("Instructions on Small Unit Offensive Operations") and "Instruction sur le combat offensif des grandes unités" on 26 January ("Instructions on large Unit Offensive Operations"). On 20 April, General Ferdinand Foch, commander of Groupe d'armées du Nord (GAN, Northern Army Group) issued "L'Instruction du Général Commandant du GAN sur la bataille offensive" ("The GAN Commander's Instruction on Offensive Battle") an 82-page pamphlet on the stages and processes of an attack on enemy positions prepared in depth. The pamphlet was a substantial revision of Note 5779, derived from "But et conditions d'une action offensive d'ensemble" (Purpose and Conditions of Comprehensive Offensive Action 16 April 1915), a manual compiled from analysis of the fighting in 1914 and the basis of French offensive planning in 1915. Battle would now be methodical until the power of resistance of the defender was broken by "moral, material and physical degradation", while the attacker retained the ability to continue the offensive; a breakthrough was unlikely but not ruled out. Co-ordination of artillery and infantry was fundamental to the process, in which artillery would destroy defences and then infantry would occupy them, infantry objectives being determined by the capacity of artillery to prepare the way and limit casualties.

Artillery bombardments were to be co-ordinated with infantry attacks, various types of artillery being given targets suitable for their characteristics, for the cumulative destruction of field defences and the killing of German infantry. Heavy artillery and mortars were to be used for the destruction of field fortifications, howitzers and light mortars for the destruction of trenches, machine-gun and observation posts; heavy guns and mortars to destroy fortified villages and concrete strong points. Longer-range guns were to engage German artillery with counter-battery fire, to deprive German infantry of artillery support during the attack, when French infantry were at their most vulnerable. Wire cutting was to be performed by field artillery, firing high-explosive (HE) shells and supported by specialist wire-cutting sections of infantry, which would go out the night before an attack. During the attack, the field artillery would fire a linear barrage on trenches and the edges of woods and villages. Infantry tactics were to be based on reconnaissance, clear objectives, liaison with flanking units and the avoidance of disorganisation within attacking units. General attacks would need to be followed by the systematic capture of remaining defences to obtain jumping-off positions for the next general attack.

==== British ====
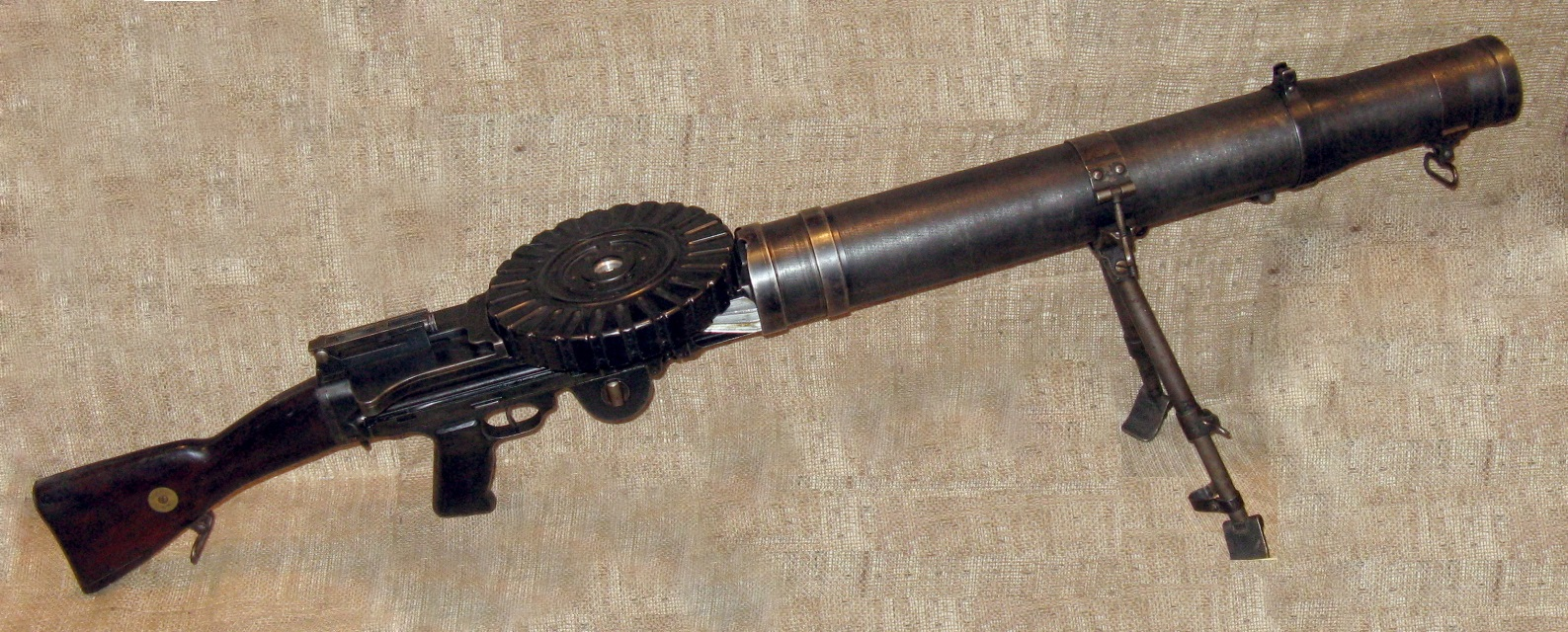
An example of a Lewis gun

In 1915, British tactical thinking had been based on the experience of its Western Front battles, particularly the Battle of Loos in September and the study of French and German experience in translated manuals and pamphlets. British planners knew the importance of organised artillery firepower and the integration of types of weapons and equipment. Creeping barrages, smoke screens and cloud gas discharges were to be used along with aircraft, Stokes mortars (a light trench mortar), Lewis guns (a light machine-gun) and elaborate signals systems to counter the chronic lack of communication, once infantry advanced beyond their telephone system when they attacked. Troops were to advance in a succession of lines grouped into waves, followed by parties to consolidate captured ground or pass through the leading troops and continue the advance.

The 9th (Scottish) Division had attacked at Loos with four battalions on a front 1,600 yd (1,500 m) wide, each battalion in three waves. A second battalion followed each of the leading battalions in the same formation, ready to leapfrog beyond and a second brigade followed the first as a reserve. Six lines of infantry, with the soldiers 2 yd (1.8 m) apart had confronted the German defence. Lines and waves had been made thinner and shallower since then. On 14 July 1916, in the attack on Longueval, the 9th (Scottish) Division advanced with four battalions. Companies were arranged in columns of platoons, creating four platoon waves 70 yd (64 m) apart. One of the attacking brigades advanced with each battalion on a two-company front with two companies behind and a second battalion following on. Each section of the front was attacked by sixteen platoon waves. Six platoons had attacked on a front of about 1,000 yd (910 m), roughly one soldier every 5.5 yd (5.0 m).

==== German ====
On the Somme front, the construction plan ordered by Falkenhayn in January 1915 had been completed. Barbed wire obstacles had been enlarged from one belt 5–10 yd (4.6–9.1 m) deep to two belts 30 yd (27 m) deep and about 15 yd (14 m) apart. Double and triple thickness wire was used and laid 3–5 ft (0.91–1.52 m) high. The front line had been increased from one trench to three, dug 150–200 yd (140–180 m) apart, to create a front position, the first trench (Kampfgraben, fighting or battle trench) occupied by sentry groups, the second (Wohngraben, accommodation trench) for the front-trench garrison and the third trench for local reserves. The trenches were traversed and had sentry-posts in concrete recesses built into the parapet. Dugouts had been deepened from 6–9 ft (1.8–2.7 m) to 20–30 ft (6.1–9.1 m), 50 yd (46 m) apart and large enough for 25 men. An intermediate line of strongpoints (Stützpunktlinie) about 1,000 yd (910 m) behind the front position, wired for all-round defence, had also been built. Communication trenches ran back to the reserve lines, renamed the second position, which was as well built and wired as the first position. The second position was beyond the range of Allied field artillery, to force an attacker to stop an advance for long enough to move artillery forward.

== Prelude ==
=== Anglo-French preparations ===
==== Aircraft ====
For long-distance reconnaissance, bombing and attacks on Die Fliegertruppe (the Imperial German Flying Corps up to October, then Deutsche Luftstreitkräfte, [German Air Force]) the 9th (Headquarters) Wing of the Royal Flying Corps (RFC) was moved to the Somme front, with 21, 27, 60 squadrons and part of 70 Squadron. The Fourth Army had the support of IV Brigade RFC, with two squadrons of the 14th (Army) Wing, four squadrons of the 3rd Wing and 1 1 Kite Balloon Squadron, with a section for each corps. Corps squadrons, 3, 4, 9 and 15 had 30 aircraft for counter-battery work and 13 aircraft for contact-patrol, where reconnaissance aircraft flew low over the battlefield to map the positions of British troops. Brigade headquarters had been ignorant of events and arrangements were made for the swift transmission of information forwards. There were 16 aircraft for trench reconnaissance, destructive bombardment and other duties and nine aircraft in reserve.

VII Corps (Lieutenant-General Thomas Snow) in the Third Army was given 8 Squadron with 18 aircraft and 5 Kite Balloon Section. On the Somme the RFC had 185 aircraft against the German 2nd Army aircraft establishment, which also had to face the French Aviation Militaire on either side of the Somme (the Anglo-French air effort considerably outnumbered the Germans until mid-July). Protection for corps aircraft was to be provided by standing patrols of pairs of aircraft and offensive sweeps by the two army squadrons. (Note: After 30 January 1916, each British army had a Royal Flying Corps brigade attached, which was divided into wings, the corps wing with squadrons responsible for close reconnaissance, photography and artillery observation on the front of each corps and an army wing, which controlled the fighter squadrons and conducted long-range reconnaissance and bombing, using the aircraft types with the highest performance.) Bombing attacks were to be made on the railways behind the German front, with the main effort beginning on 1 July, to ensure that damage could not be repaired before the offensive. Troops, transport columns, supply dumps and headquarters behind the battlefront were to be attacked and the ammunition depots at Mons, Namur and Lille were to be specially attacked. The French Sixth Army (General Émile Fayolle), had 201 aeroplanes.

==== Artillery ====
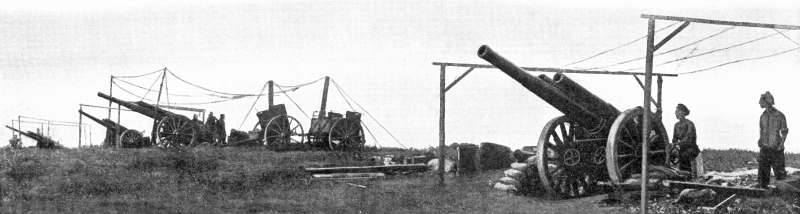
60-pounder gun battery

The British had substantially increased the amount of artillery on the Western Front after the Battle of Loos in late 1915 but the length of front to be bombarded on the Somme led to the preparatory bombardment being planned to last for five days. There had been a debate about the merits of a short hurricane bombardment but there were insufficient guns quickly to destroy German field defences and be certain that barbed wire was cut, given the dependence of the artillery on air observation and the uncertain weather. (Note: In 1916, despite improvisation and inexperience, British industry produced 33,507 machine-guns, 5,192 trench mortars with 6,500,000 rounds, 127,000 long tons (129,000 t) of explosives and 84,000 long tons (85,000 t) of propellants. Mills bomb production rose to 1,400,000 per week and the output of shells rose from 4,336,800 in the first quarter of 1916 to 20,888,400 in the final quarter, for an annual total of more than fifty million. On the Somme, 148,000 long tons (150,000 t) of ammunition were expended from 24 June – 23 July and 101,771 long tons (103,404 t) were landed in France. Some heavy guns and howitzers burst on firing, due to defective shells made from inferior steel with hairline cracks, through which the propellant discharge detonated the shell. The fuzes of 8-inch howitzers failed so often that the battlefield was littered with blinds (duds) and a remedy made the fuzes fall out. Many shells failed to explode due to deterioration of the explosive filling and many guns misfired due to poor quality barrels. The 60-pounder guns averaged a premature explosion every 500 shrapnel rounds and 4.5-inch howitzer shells exploded in the barrel or 4–5 yd (3.7–4.6 m) beyond the muzzle, the crews being nicknamed suicide clubs. Some propellants were not fully consumed on firing, requiring the barrel to be cleaned after each shot, which slowed the rate of fire. Some copper driving bands on 18-pounder field gun shells were too hard, which reduced the accuracy of the gun; when high-explosive ammunition had been introduced late in 1915, premature detonations and bulges occurred, with a burst barrel every thousand shots. There was a shortage of buffer springs, replacements were sometimes worse than worn ones and spare parts for every mechanical device in the army were lacking. Some shells exuded explosive in the summer heat, flare fillings decomposed, phosphorus bombs went off spontaneously and the firing mechanism of the heavy trench mortars failed on 1 July. Stokes mortar ammunition was chronically unreliable until replaced by improved designs. Many Mills bombs and rifle grenades prematurely detonated or were duds and a make of rifle cartridge jammed in the breach after firing and had to be scrapped.)

The artillery had to cut barbed wire and neutralise German artillery with counter-battery fire. The British artillery fired more than 1.5 million shells during the preliminary bombardment, more than in the first year of the war. On 1 July, another 250,000 shells were fired; the guns could be heard on Hampstead Heath, 165 mi (266 km) away. While this weight of bombardment was new for the British, it was common on the Western Front; at the Second Battle of Artois in May 1915, there had been a six-day preparatory bombardment with over 2.1 million shells. British shell production had increased since the shell scandal of 1915 but quality had been sacrificed for quantity. Shrapnel shells were virtually useless against entrenched positions and required accurate fuze settings to cut wire; very little high-explosive ammunition had been manufactured for field artillery. (Note: Field artillery: 808 18-pounder guns for wire-cutting with shrapnel and bombarding troops in the open, 202 4.5-inch howitzers. Heavy artillery: 32 4.7-inch guns for counter-battery fire, 128 60-pounder guns for counter-battery fire, 20 6-inch guns for wire-cutting and counter-battery fire, 1 9.2-inch railway gun, 1 12-inch railway gun, 104 6-inch howitzers, 64 8-inch howitzers, 60 9.2-inch howitzers, 11 12-inch railway howitzers. Six 15-inch howitzers, 288 2-inch medium mortars and 28 heavy trench mortars were reserved for wire cutting. The French supplied 60 75 mm guns (gas shell only), twenty-four 120 mm guns, sixteen 220 mm howitzers.) The French Sixth Army had 552 heavy guns and howitzers, with a much larger supply of high-explosive ammunition for field artillery and far more experienced personnel.

==== Cavalry ====
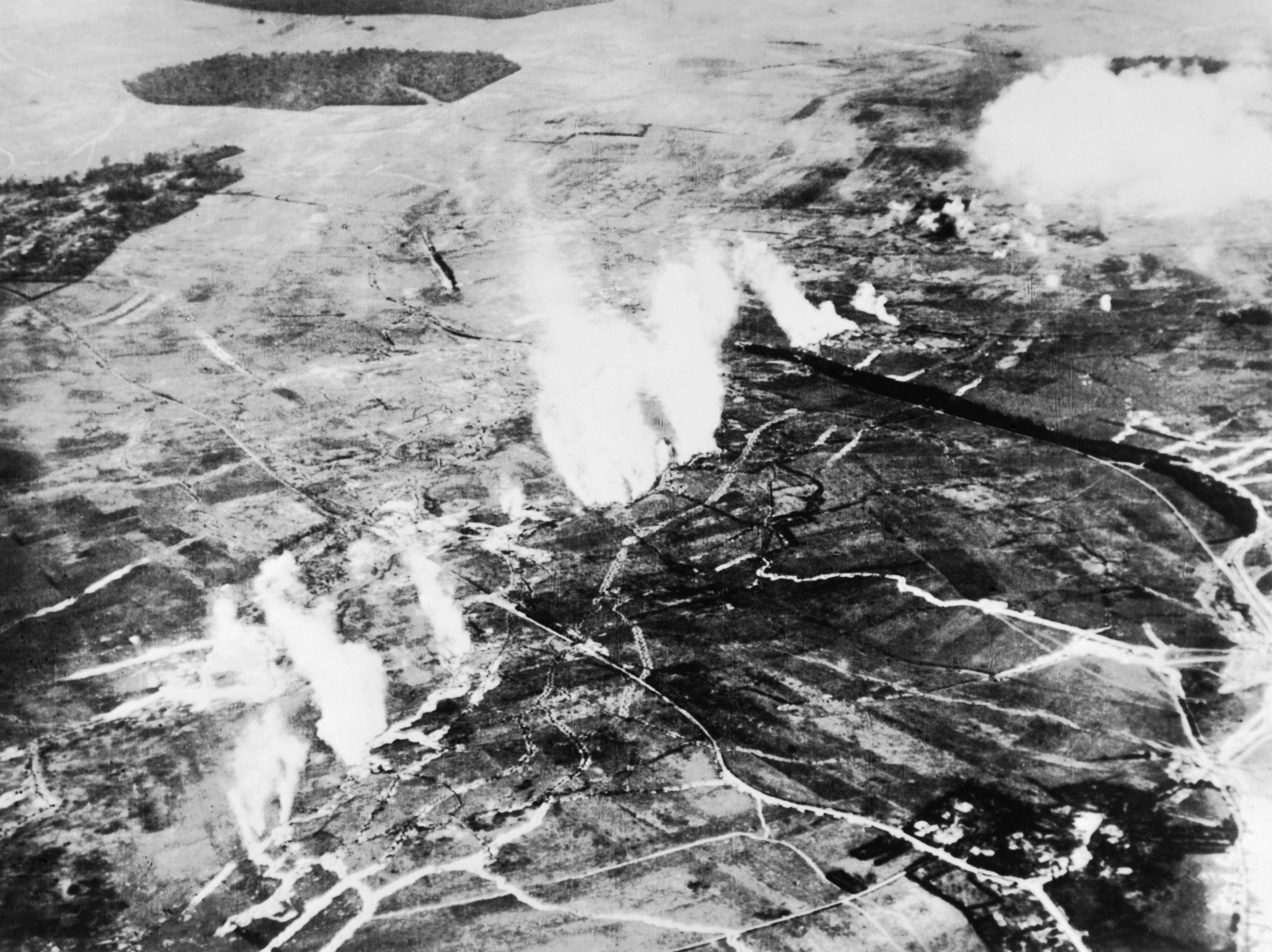
Aerial photograph of a British gas attack from Carnoy to Montauban, shortly before the Somme offensive.

In March, the two British cavalry corps were disbanded and the divisions distributed to the armies and the new Reserve Corps (General Hubert Gough). In June, the Reserve Corps was reinforced and became the Reserve Army. The Reserve Army cavalry was to operate combined with infantry and artillery, ready to act as a "conveyor belt", to exploit a success by the Fourth Army, with the 25th Division in the lead followed by two cavalry divisions and then II Corps. In mid-June, II Corps was transferred to the Fourth Army; the French Sixth Army contained four cavalry divisions.

In late June, favourable intelligence reports and the reduction of the French commitment for the Somme offensive led to a change of plan by the British. Should the German army collapse, the cavalry was to follow up, capture Bapaume and take post on the right flank, to provide a flank guard of all-arms detachments facing east, as the main body of cavalry and the infantry advanced northwards. The 1st, 2nd (Indian) and 3rd Cavalry divisions were to assemble by zero hour 5 mi (8.0 km) west of Albert around Buire, Bresle, Bonny and La Neuville, ready to move forward or remain and then return to billets behind Amiens depending on events.

==== Infantry ====
A BEF manual published on 8 May 1916 (SS 109, Training of Divisions For Offensive Action), described successions of lines to add driving power to the attack, to reach the objective with the capacity to consolidate the captured ground against counter-attack. (Note: Paddy Griffith criticised James Edmonds, the official historian, for assuming that line-formations were rigid, not capable of infiltration and inferior to small groups or blobs, despite them being complementary forms which were used throughout the war.) In the Fourth Army Tactical Notes of May 1916, battalions were allowed to attack on a front of 2–4 platoons in 8–4 waves about 100 yd (91 m) apart. Supporting lines were to pass through the leading ones, to avoid excessive demands on the energy and ability of individual soldiers. Weight of numbers was rejected as a tactic; each platoon was to carry half the burden of a brigade attack for a few minutes, before being relieved by a fresh wave. Platoons were divided into functions, fighting, mopping-up, support and carrying; the fighting platoons were to press on as the moppers-up secured the ground behind them. Support and carrying platoons could pick their way through artillery barrages with the tools and weapons needed to consolidate and defeat German counter-attacks.

Some troops in carrying platoons had about 66 lb (30 kg) of equipment and tools, whereas troops in the advanced platoons carried a rifle, bayonet, 170 rounds of ammunition, iron ration (an emergency ration of preserved food, tea, sugar and salt), two grenades, pick, shovel or entrenching tool, four empty sandbags, two gas helmets, wire cutters, a smoke candle and a water-bottle. (Note: In the 56th (1/1st London) Division, each man carried 200 rounds of small-arms ammunition, a waterproof sheet, haversack, iron ration and the day's ration, two or three sandbags, two gas helmets and a "proportion of wire-cutters, bill-hooks and tools".) In the French army, the experience of 1915 showed that despite the power of French bombardments, infantry would enter a chaotic environment, full of German pockets of resistance and individuals who had been by-passed. By mid-1916 much of the French infantry in the Sixth Army were specialist rifle-and-bayonet men, bombers, rifle grenadiers or light machine-gun crews. Attacking waves were spread wider and companies trained to manoeuvre in small groups, to get behind surviving German defences, as Nettoyeurs de Tranchées (trench cleaners) armed with hand-grenades and revolvers, searched captured ground for stray Germans and hidden machine-gunners, although such methods did not come into general use until later in the year.

==== Mining ====
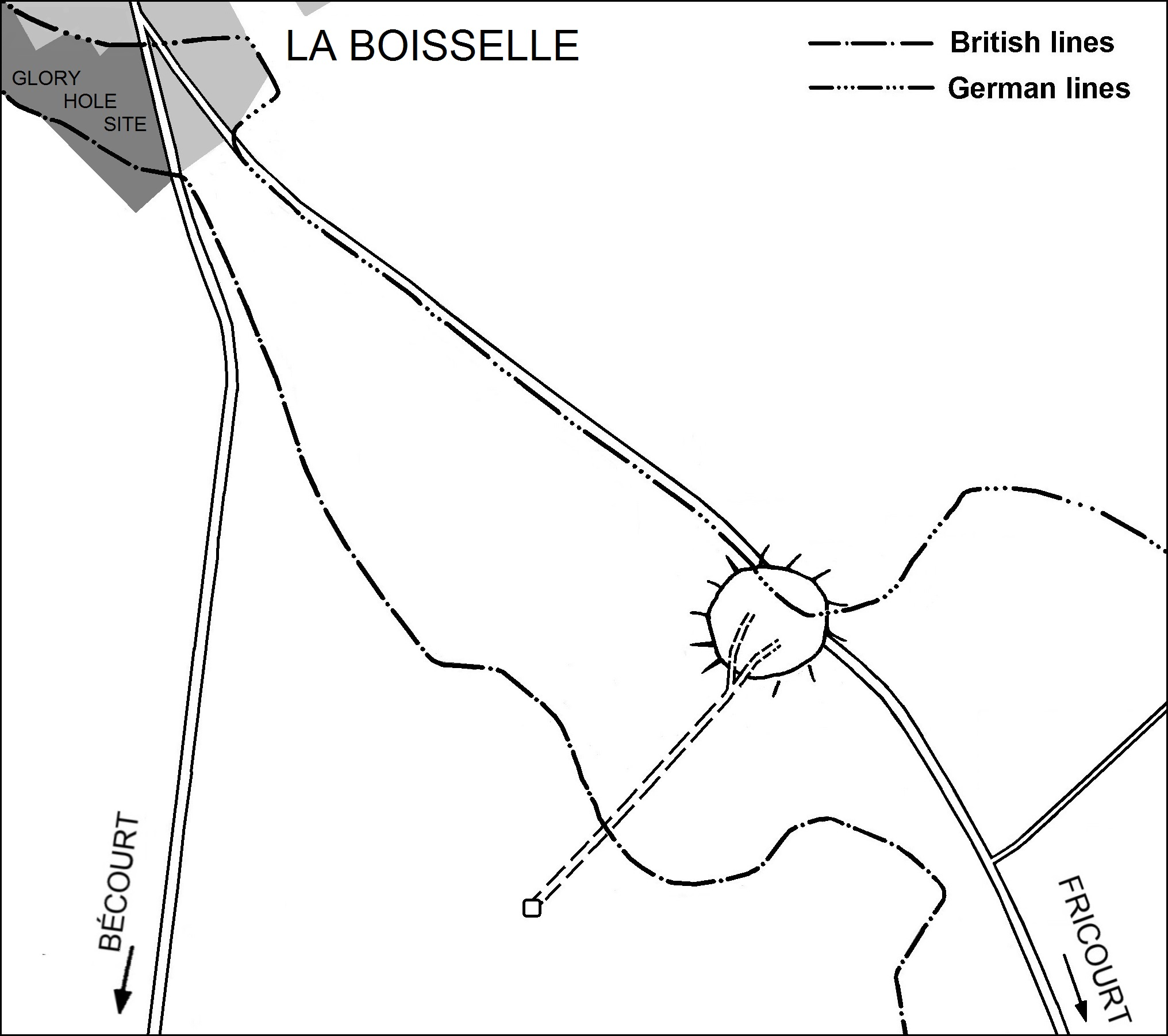
Diagram of the Lochnagar mine

The chalk soil of the Somme was ideal for tunnelling and the British inherited a number of mine workings from the French army. The British tunnelling companies placed 19 mines beneath the German front positions and prepared Russian saps from the British front line into no man's land, to be opened at zero hour and allow the infantry to attack the German positions from a comparatively short distance. The mines on the Somme were the largest yet in the war. The mines were to destroy the German defences and to provide shelter in no man's land for the advancing infantry. Eight large and eleven small mines were prepared for the first day of the battle; three large mines of up to 24 long tons (24 t) and seven mines around 5,000 lb (2.2 long tons).

When the mines were blown, infantry were to rush forward to seize the craters; the largest mines, each containing 24 long tons (24 t) of ammonal, were on either side of the Albert–Bapaume road near La Boisselle, Y Sap mine north of the road and Lochnagar mine to the south. H3, the other large mine was planted under Hawthorn Ridge Redoubt near Beaumont Hamel, containing 18 long tons (18 t) of explosive. The mines were to be detonated at 7:28 a.m., two minutes before zero hour, except for the Hawthorn Ridge mine, which was to be sprung at 7:20 a.m. (The small mine at Kasino Point was mistimed and blown after the infantry attack had commenced.)

==== Supply ====
BEF railway tonnage (1916)
Month	LT
Jan	2,484
Feb	2,535
Mar	2,877
Apr	3,121
May	3,391
Jun	4,265
Jul	4,478
Aug	4,804
Sept	4,913
Oct	5,324
Nov	5,107
Dec	5,202

From 1 January to 3 July 1916 the BEF was reinforced by 17 divisions and the number of heavy guns increased from 324 to 714. The new divisions needed 51 1/2 supply trains a week to meet daily needs and a large number of extra trains to transport heavy artillery ammunition. Until mid-June, ammunition supply for the BEF needed 5–12 trains per week, then rose to 45 to 90 trains a week, to deliver 148,000 long tons (150,000 t) of munitions. Ammunition expenditure became a concern by 12 July but deliveries to the area behind the Fourth Army kept pace, although transport from railheads to the guns was not always maintained. In the weeks before 1 July, an extra seven trains a day were sufficient to deliver ammunition. In the rear of the Fourth Army, huge encampments were built for troops, horses, artillery and workshops, dumps were filled with equipment, reservoirs and pipelines.

Power stations, light railways roads and telephone networks were constructed and more than 2,000,000 imp gal (9,100,000 L; 2,400,000 US gal) of petrol per month was delivered for the lorry fleet, moving supplies up to 3 mi (4.8 km) from railheads to the front line. A million Brodie helmets were delivered between January and June. In the 37th Division area, 91,420 man-hours were needed to dig 3.7 mi (6 km) of trenches, jumping-off points, command-posts, dug-outs, machine-gun emplacements and ammunition stores, for wiring and for maintenance. In the French Sixth Army sector, one railway line from Amiens led to Bray-sur-Somme on the north bank but on the south bank there were no rail lines; road convoys carried supplies from Amiens to Foucaucourt-en-Santerre.

==== Intelligence ====
In March and April, eight German divisions were believed to be in reserve opposite the British from the Somme to the North Sea coast. Divisions in reserve behind the 4th Army were then moved south to Artois in the 6th Army area. From 4 to 14 June, the success of the Brusilov Offensive became apparent and agent reports showed increased railway movement from Belgium to Germany. The final BEF military intelligence estimate before 1 July had 32 German battalions opposite the Fourth Army and 65 battalions in reserve or close enough to reach the battlefield in the first week. Five of the seven German divisions in reserve had been engaged at Verdun and some divisions had been transferred from France to the Eastern Front. Men of the 1916 conscription class were appearing among German prisoners of war, suggesting that the German army had been weakened and that the British could break down the German front line and force a battle of manoeuvre on the defenders. In late June, the British part of the Somme plan was amended, rapidly to capture Bapaume and envelop the German defences northwards to Arras, rather than southwards to Péronne. An increase in the number of trains moving from Germany to Belgium was discovered but the quality of German troops opposite the British was thought to have been much reduced. The true number of German divisions in reserve in France was ten, with six opposite the British, double the number the British knew about. Reports of work continuing on the German defences opposite the Fourth Army in March and April led the planners to adopt a less optimistic view, particularly due to the news about very deep shell-proof shelters being dug under German front trenches, which were far less vulnerable to bombardment.

=== Plan ===
British planning for the offensive had begun in April, with a Fourth Army proposal for a methodical advance to the high ground around Thiepval and thence to the Bapaume–Péronne road. Haig had exhaustive negotiations with Joffre and rejected the concept in favour of the capture of the ridge north of Péronne to assist a French crossing of the Somme further south. Diversion of French divisions to Verdun and the assumption by the British of the main role in the offensive, led to revisions of the plan towards an ambitious attempt at strategic attrition, through a breakthrough and a battle of manoeuvre with distant objectives. The French Sixth Army, in GAN, was the last of the three French armies originally intended for the Somme, the Tenth Army and Second Army having been sent to Verdun. Joffre placed XX Corps north of the river, next to the British XIII Corps, the southernmost Fourth Army formation. British plans were made by a process of negotiation between Haig and General Henry Rawlinson, the Fourth Army commander. Haig became more optimistic at what could be achieved early in an offensive, given the examples of Gorlice-Tarnów in 1915 and at Verdun early in 1916. Rawlinson favoured a methodical attack from the beginning of the offensive, in which belts of the German defences about 2,000 yd (1,800 m) deep, would be pulverised by artillery and then occupied by infantry. An attempt to reach deeper objectives towards the German second position, risked infantry being counter-attacked beyond the cover of field artillery but had the advantage of exploiting a period when German artillery was being withdrawn. (Note: Gary Sheffield criticised Rawlinson for pessimism over Haig's idea of a mixed force of infantry, cavalry and artillery, which Sheffield called a "bold and imaginative" response to the failures of 1915, justified by precedent and foreshadowing later forms of mobile warfare.)

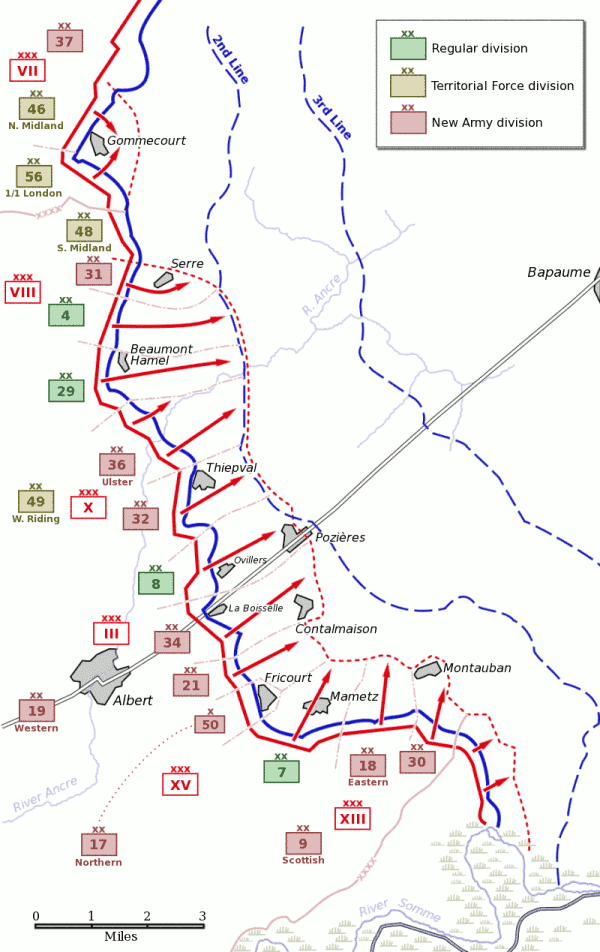
Anglo-French objectives, north bank of the Somme, 1 July 1916

On 16 April, Rawlinson announced the objectives to the corps commanders, in which III, X and VIII corps would capture Pozières, Grandcourt and Serre on the first day and XIII and XV corps would have objectives to be agreed later. On 19 April, Rawlinson wrote that an attempt to reach the German second line on the first day was doubtful, an extension of the attack in the south on Montauban required another division and the inclusion of Gommecourt to the north, was beyond the resources of the Fourth Army. Rawlinson also wrote that long bombardment was dependent on the French, the availability of ammunition and the endurance of gun-crews; the exploitation of a successful attack would need a substantial number of fresh divisions.

The process of discussion and negotiation also took place between Rawlinson and the corps commanders and between corps and divisional commanders. For the first time daily objectives were set, rather than an unlimited advance and discretion was granted in the means to achieve them. When the frontage of attack had been decided, corps headquarters settled the details and arranged the building of the infrastructure of attack: dugouts, magazines, observation posts, telephone lines, roads, light railways, tramways and liaison with neighbouring corps and the RFC. For the first time, the army headquarters co-ordinated the artillery arrangements with an Army Artillery Operation Order, in which tasks and timetable were laid down and corps artillery officers left to decide the means to achieve them. (Note: Andrew Simpson disagreed with Tim Travers' claim in The Killing Ground: The British Army, The Western Front and The Emergence of Modern War 1900–1918 (1987) that discussion was unwelcome in the BEF, after a comparison of five of the corps involved in the attack of 1 July, which demonstrated "a consistent pattern of consultation between the army commanders and their subordinates at corps and between the latter and their divisional commanders. Objectives would be agreed between army and corps, resources allocated and divisions expected to come up with the actual plans of attack".)

On 16 June, Haig discussed the Anglo-French intentions for the campaign, which were to relieve pressure on the French at Verdun, assist Italy and Russia by preventing the transfer of divisions from the Western Front and to inflict losses on the Westheer (German army in the west), through the capture of Pozières Ridge from Montauban to the Ancre, the area from the Ancre to Serre to protect the flank, then exploit the position gained according to circumstances. If German resistance collapsed, an advance east would be pressed far enough to pass through the German defences and the attack would turn north, to envelop the German defences as far as Monchy le Preux near Arras, with cavalry on the outer flank to defend against a counter-attack. Should a continuation of the advance beyond the first objective not be possible, the main effort could be transferred elsewhere, while the Fourth Army continued to mount local attacks.

On 28 June, the Fourth Army headquarters instructed that if the Germans collapsed, the closest infantry would exploit without waiting for cavalry; the 19th (Western) and 49th (West Riding) divisions (in local reserve) would be committed along the Albert–Bapaume road and parallel to it to the north. The cavalry, which had assembled 5 mi (8.0 km) west of Albert, was not to move until roads had been cleared for their advance. Haig had formulated a plan in which success of any magnitude could be exploited but Rawlinson had a much more modest intention of small advances onto high ground and pauses to consolidate, to repulse German counter-attacks, which led to an "unhappy compromise".

=== German preparations ===
Weather (23 June – 1 July)
Date	Rain mm	°F/°C	
23	2.0	79°–55° 26°–12°	wind
24	1.0	72°–52° 22°–11°	dull
25	1.0	71°–54° 22°–12°	wind
26	6.0	72°–52° 22°–11°	cloud
27	8.0	68°–54° 20°–12°	cloud
28	2.0	68°–50° 20°–10°	dull
29	0.1	66°–52° 19°–11°	cloud wind
30	0.0	72°–48° 22°–9°	dull gale
1 Jul	0.0	79°–52° 26°–11°	clear

Many of the German units on the Somme had arrived in 1914 and made great efforts to fortify the defensive line, particularly with barbed-wire entanglements beyond the front trench, with fewer troops. Railways, roads and waterways connected the battlefront to the Ruhr, the source of material for minierte Stollen, dug-outs 20–30 ft (6.1–9.1 m) underground, big enough for 25 men each, excavated every 50 yd (46 m). In February 1916, following the Herbstschlacht (Autumn Battle, Second Battle of Champagne) in 1915, a third defensive position another 3,000 yd (1.7 mi; 2.7 km) back from the Stützpunktlinie was begun and was nearly complete on the Somme front when the battle began. The German artillery was organised in Sperrfeuerstreifen (barrage sectors); each infantry officer was expected to know the batteries covering his section of the front line and the batteries had to be ready to engage fleeting targets. A telephone system with lines 6 ft (1.8 m) deep 5 mi (8.0 km) back from the front line linked the artillery.

The Somme defences had two inherent weaknesses that the rebuilding had not remedied. The front trenches were on a forward slope, lined by white chalk from the subsoil and easily seen by observers on the British side of no man's land. The defences were crowded towards the front trench, with a regiment having two battalions near the front-trench system and the reserve battalion divided between the Stützpunktlinie and the second position, all within 2,000 yd (1,800 m) of the front line; most troops were within 1,000 yd (910 m) of the front line, in the new deep dugouts. The concentration of troops forward guaranteed that they would face the bulk of an artillery bombardment, directed by ground observers on clearly marked lines. Digging and wiring of a new third position had begun in May; civilians were moved away and stocks of ammunition and hand-grenades were increased in the front-line.

By mid-June, General Fritz von Below (commander of the 2nd Army) and Crown Prince Rupprecht (commander of the 6th Army) expected an attack on the 2nd Army, which held the front from north of Gommecourt to Noyon south of the Somme. Falkenhayn was more concerned about an offensive in Alsace-Lorraine and an attack on the 6th Army that held the front north of the 2nd Army, from Gommecourt to St Eloi near Ypres. In April, Falkenhayn had suggested a spoiling attack by the 6th Army but the demands of the offensive at Verdun made it impossible. In May, Below proposed a preventive attack (a suggestion latter reduced, in June, to an operation from Ovillers to St Pierre Divion) but was only assigned one more artillery regiment, some labour battalions and captured Russian heavy artillery. On 6 June, Below reported that air reconnaissance showed that attacks at Fricourt and Gommecourt were possible and that the French troops south of the Somme had been reinforced. XVII Corps held the ground opposite the French but it was overstretched, with twelve regiments holding 22 mi (36 km) of front line with no reserves.

In mid-June, Falkenhayn remained sceptical of an offensive on the Somme, as a great success would lead to operations in Belgium; an offensive in Alsace-Lorraine would take the war and its devastation into Germany. More railway activity, fresh digging and camp extensions around Albert opposite the 2nd Army was seen by German air observers on 9 and 11 June; spies reported an imminent offensive. On 24 June, a British prisoner spoke of a five-day bombardment to begin on 26 June and local units expected an attack within days. On 27 June, 14 observation balloons were visible, one for each British division. No German reinforcements were sent to the area until 1 July and only then to the 6th Army, that had also been given control of the three divisions in OHL reserve behind it. At Verdun, on 24 June, Crown Prince Wilhelm was ordered to conserve troops, ammunition and equipment and further restrictions were imposed on 1 July when two divisions were taken under OHL command. By 30 June, the German air strength on the 2nd Army front was six Feldflieger-Abteilungen (reconnaissance flights) with 42 aircraft, four Artillerieflieger-Abteilungen (artillery flights) with 17 aeroplanes, Kampfgeschwader 1 (Bomber-Fighter Squadron 1) with 43 aircraft, Kampfstaffel 32 (Bomber-Fighter Flight 32) with 8 aeroplanes and a Kampfeinsitzer-Kommando (single-seat fighter detachment) with 19 aeroplanes, a total of 129 aircraft.

== Battle ==
=== French Sixth Army ===
==== XXXV Corps ====
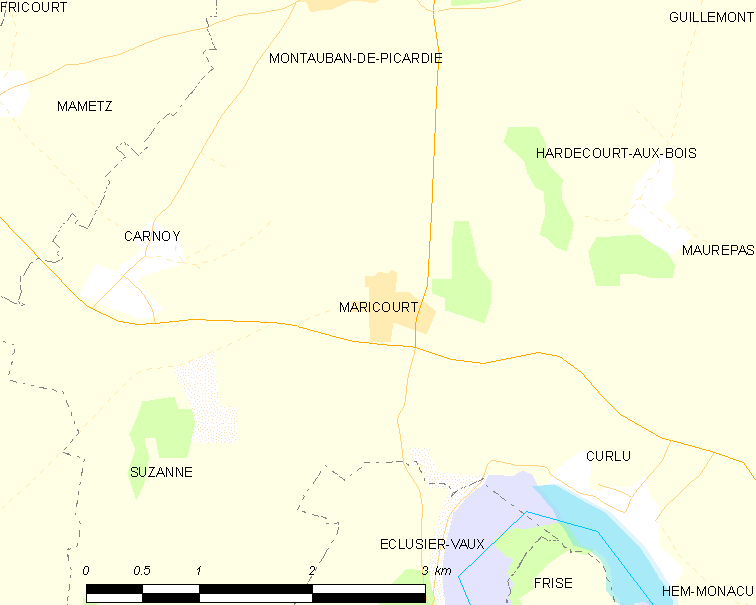
Modern map of Maricourt and vicinity (commune FR insee code 80513)

South of the river, the XXXV Corps (the 51st, 61st and 121st Divisions, backed by 20 batteries of heavy artillery) attacked two hours after the offensive began on the north bank. The 61st Division was right-flank guard for the I Colonial Corps near the river. A French attack of any great size on the south bank had been considered impossible by the German command and after the 10th Bavarian Division was transferred north of the river to reinforce the XIV Reserve Corps, divisional frontages were made even wider on the south side of the river, the three remaining divisions of XVII Corps using their third regiment to fill the gap at the cost of having no reserve. The French preliminary bombardment caused the Germans many casualties and destroyed many machine-guns and mortars.

When the attack began, concealed by mist, the German defenders were surprised and overrun. The French artillery had c. 10 heavy batteries per 0.62 mi (1 km) of front, 18 observation balloons were opposite the German 11th Division alone and French artillery observation aircraft were flown so low by their pilots over Estrées that German soldiers could see the faces of the crews. The division had only two field artillery regiments and part of one regiment sent as reinforcement, with no heavy guns for counter-battery fire, except for periodic support from a small number of heavy guns covering all of the south side of the river.

The German artillery group around Estrées, Soyécourt and Fay, attempted a systematic bombardment of the French front line on 30 June. The French replied with 2,000 heavy shells on one German field regiment alone, that knocked out three guns. By the time of the attack of 1 July, German artillery on the south bank had been hit by 15,000 shells and had almost been silenced by 11:00 a.m. Only eight heavy batteries were available to the Germans on the south bank; at 9:30 a.m., the French barrage lifted off the German front line and three mines were blown under a redoubt at the village of Fay. A measure of surprise was gained, despite losses to German flanking fire from beyond the southern flank of the attack. Grenadier Regiment 10 had been subjected to a "torrent" of fire overnight, which had forced the German infantry to shelter in mine galleries. A gas bombardment was synchronised with the French infantry attack and the mine explosions at 10:00 a.m. killed many of the sheltering troops. By 2:00 p.m. the German defences had been overwhelmed and the garrisons killed or captured; such reinforcements as existed were moved forward to occupy the second position south of Assevillers.

==== I Colonial Corps ====
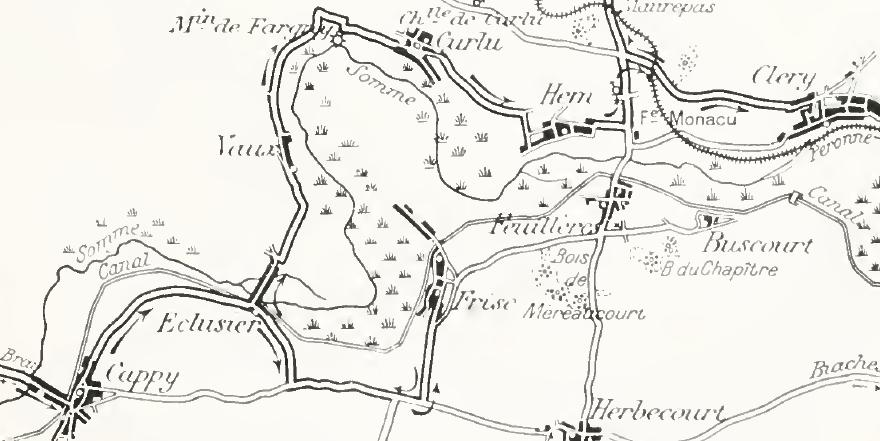
Banks of the Somme, 1916

On the south bank, the I Colonial Corps (2nd, 3rd, 16th Colonial and the 99th Territorial divisions along with 65 heavy artillery batteries) also attacked two hours after the main assault. The 2nd and 3rd Colonial divisions, advanced between XXXV Corps and the river and overran the first line of the German 121st Division, holding the line south from the Somme, in fifteen minutes, taking Dompierre-Bequincourt. On the French left flank, Frise held out until the village was re-bombarded and then taken by a second attack at 12:30 p.m. The 2nd and 3rd Colonial divisions began probing 8,200 ft (2,500 m) of the German second position held by the III Battalion, Infantry Regiment 60 around Assevillers and Herbécourt. Assevillers was captured at 4:00 p.m. Herbécourt was attacked from the north-west at 5:30 p.m. and captured, then lost to a German counter-attack. The colonial divisions took c. 2,000 prisoners, for very few casualties. The attack on the south bank had advanced 1.2 mi (2 km).

==== XX Corps ====
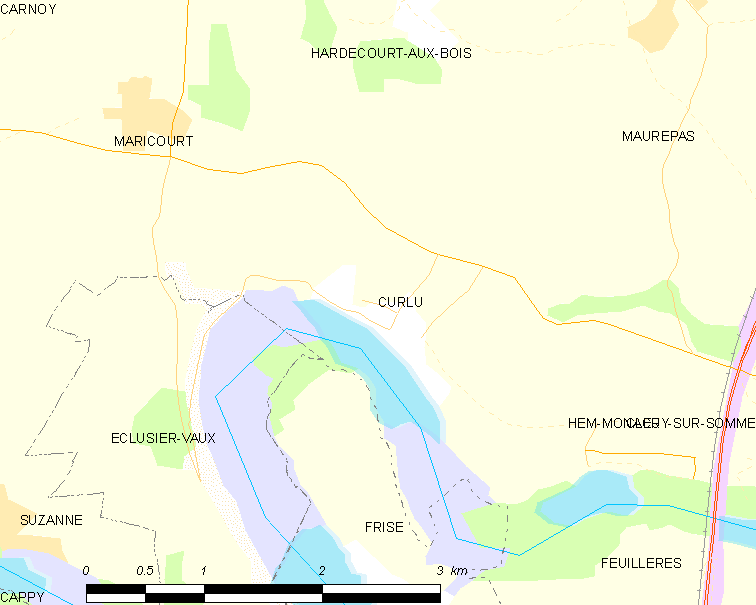
Modern map of Curlu and vicinity (commune FR insee code 80231)

North of the Somme, the French XX Corps consisted of the 11th, 39th, 72nd and 153rd divisions, with 32 batteries of heavy artillery. The 11th and 39th divisions attacked at 7.30 a.m., the commanders of the 1st Liverpool Pals (part of the 30th Division (XIII Corps) and the French 153rd Infantry Regiment advancing together. At Bois Y, north-west of Curlu, which contained many machine-guns and was protected by Menuisiers Trench 220 yd (200 m) further forward, the attack went "like clockwork". The 79th Regiment, whose final objective was 1,600 yd (1,500 m) beyond the start line, found that the French bombardment had destroyed much of the German fortifications and that the creeping barrage kept the Germans under cover. Only at Bois Favière (in the 39th Division area, where part of the wood was held by the Germans for several days) and at Curlu (in the 11th Division area on the north bank) were the Germans able to conduct an organised defence.

The 37th Regiment (11th Division) attacked Curlu and received massed small-arms fire; the regiment was repulsed from the western fringe of the village before attacks were suspended for a re-bombardment, by which time the village was outflanked on both sides. Bavarian Reserve Infantry Regiment 6 (BRIR 6) recorded the first attack at 9:00 a.m., after drumfire (so many shells exploding that the reports merged into a rumble) which began at 6:00 a.m., followed by two more until drumfire fell again at 4:00 p.m. and the remaining garrison was ordered to retire. Most of BRIR 6 was thrown in piecemeal from the river Somme to Montauban and destroyed, suffering 1,809 casualties. The French did not exploit their success, because the British did not advance to their second objective beyond Montauban. Four counter-attacks from Hardecourt were repulsed and by mid-morning 2,500 prisoners had been taken and an advance of 0.93 mi (1.5 km) had been achieved.

=== British Fourth Army ===
==== XIII Corps ====
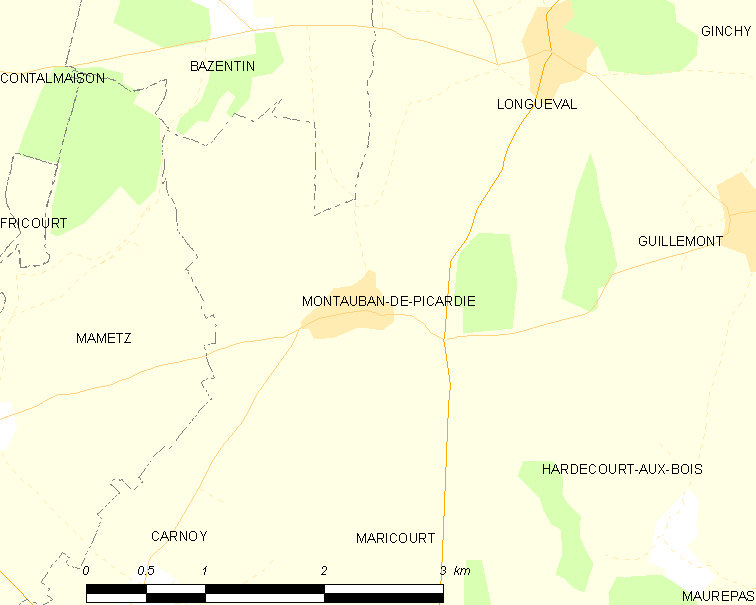
Modern map of Montauban and vicinity (commune FR insee code 80560)

The southern flank of the British line was held by XIII Corps, which attacked Montauban with the New Army 18th (Eastern) and 30th divisions. The 30th Division took its objectives by 1:00 p.m. and the 18th (Eastern) Division completed its advance by 3:00 p.m. German defences south of the Albert–Bapaume road were far less developed than to the north and were visible from territory held by the British and French. The infantry advanced behind a creeping barrage and had the benefit of the heavy artillery of French XX Corps to the south. Much of the German artillery in the area had been put out of action during the preliminary bombardment; the German second and third lines were incomplete and had no deep dugouts, except in the first trench.

On the right of the British attack, most of the German infantry and machine-guns were destroyed before the British advance; a river mist hampered the remaining defenders. In the chaos, alarmist reports were received that Bernafay and Trônes woods had been captured and before noon, every available man, including clerks and cooks was ordered forward to the second position. The 12th Reserve Division was ordered to prepare a counter-attack from Montauban to Mametz overnight but by midnight the division had only reached the second position. The 30th Division suffered 3,011 casualties, the 18th (Eastern) Division 3,115, RIR 109 suffered 2,147 casualties and BRIR 6 1,810.

==== XV Corps ====
===== Mametz =====
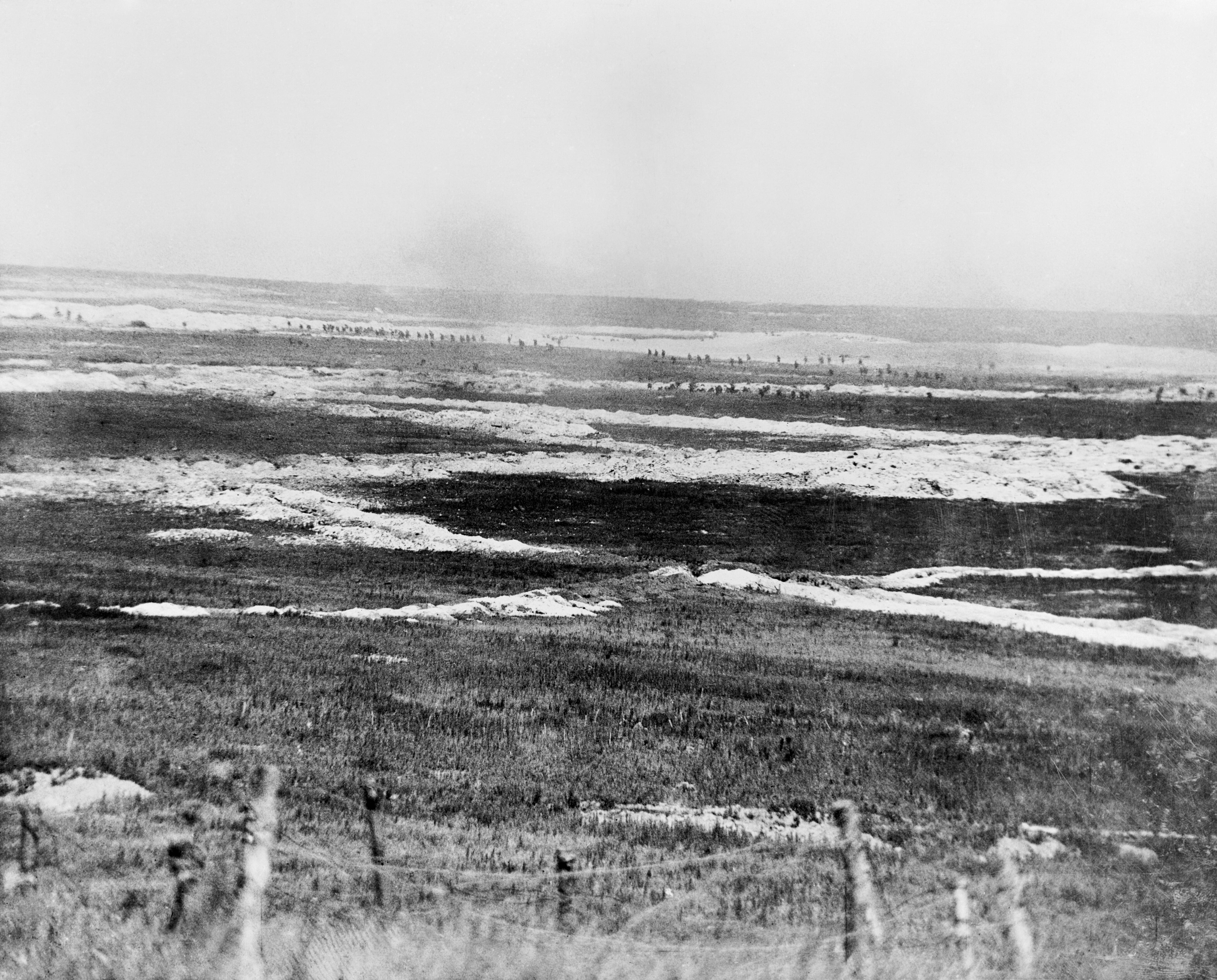
2nd Battalion, Gordon Highlanders crossing no man's land near Mametz

Mametz village was attacked by the 7th Division, which on the right flank had only 100–200 yd (91–183 m) of no man's land to cross. The infantry advanced behind a creeping field artillery barrage that lifted slowly according to a timetable and moved towards a standing barrage fired by the heavy artillery, that lifted to the next objective at set times. The right and central brigades attacked on a 1,800 yd (1,600 m) front, from support trenches behind the British front line. Crossing no man's land led to few casualties but far more were suffered as the battalions advanced 700 yd (640 m) uphill to the village. The east end was captured but several attempts on the north and west ends were repulsed. After a series of bombardments and when British troops further south began to menace the supply routes of the garrison, resistance collapsed and the village was occupied.

The west side of the village was attacked by the 20th Brigade, which had to fight forward for most of the day. The infantry pushed on to ground facing Mametz Wood and Willow Stream, outflanking Fricourt further north, though the objectives beyond Mametz were not reached. Much of the front of the 7th Division was opposite Reserve Infantry Regiment 109 (RIR 109), of the 28th Reserve Division, which should have been relieved on the night of 30 June and which received a warning of the attack from a listening station at La Boisselle. Most of the regiment was caught in their deep shelters under the front trench and cut off from telephone communication. Most of the supporting machine-guns and artillery was put out of action early on. Reinforcements were sent to the second position but not ordered to counter-attack, due to uncertainty about the situation at Montauban and the need to secure Mametz Wood. The 7th Division suffered 3,380 casualties.

===== Fricourt =====
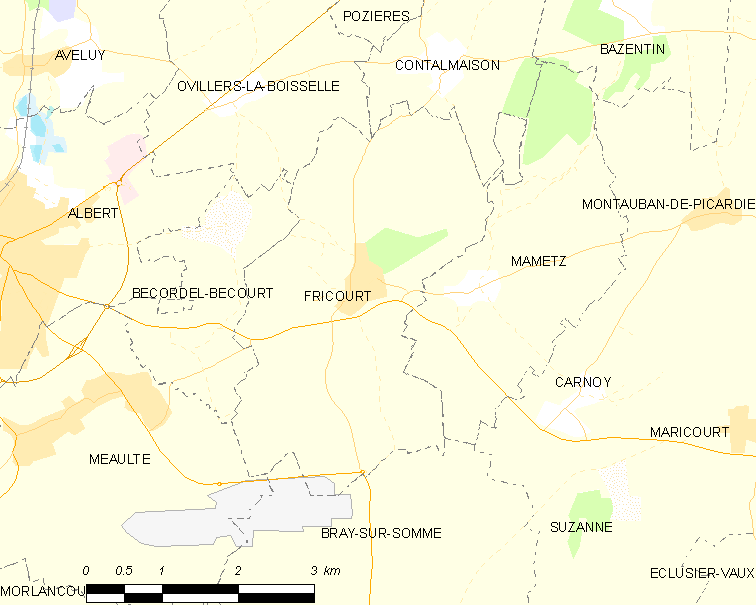
Modern map of Fricourt and vicinity (commune FR insee code 80366)

Fricourt lay in a bend in the front line, which turned eastwards for 2 mi (3.2 km) before running south to the Somme River. XV Corps was to attack either side of the village, to isolate the defenders. The 20th Brigade, 7th Division, was to capture the west end of Mametz and swing left, creating a defensive flank along Willow Stream, facing Fricourt from the south, as the 22nd Brigade waited in the British front line, ready to exploit a German retirement from the village. The 21st Division advance was to pass north of Fricourt, to reach the north bank of Willow Stream beyond Fricourt and Fricourt Wood. To limit enfilade fire from the village, the three Tambour mines were blown beneath the Tambour salient on the west edge of the village, to raise a lip of earth, to block the view from the village. The 21st Division made some progress and penetrated to the rear of Fricourt and the 50th Brigade of the 17th (Northern) Division, held the front line opposite the village.

The 10th West Yorkshire Regiment, was required to advance close by Fricourt and suffered 733 casualties, the worst battalion losses of the day. A company from the 7th Green Howards made an unplanned attack directly against the village and was annihilated. Reserve Infantry Regiment 111, opposite the 21st Division, were severely affected by the bombardment and many dug-outs were blocked by shell explosions. One company was reduced to 80 men before the British attack and a reinforcement party failed to get through the British artillery-fire, taking post in Round Wood, where it was able to repulse the 64th Brigade. The rest of the regimental reserves were used to block the route to Contalmaison. The loss of Mametz and the advance of the 21st Division made Fricourt untenable and the garrison was withdrawn during the night. The 17th Division occupied the village virtually unopposed early on 2 July and took several prisoners. The 21st Division suffered 4,256 casualties and the 50th Brigade of the 17th Division 1,155.

==== III Corps ====
===== La Boisselle =====
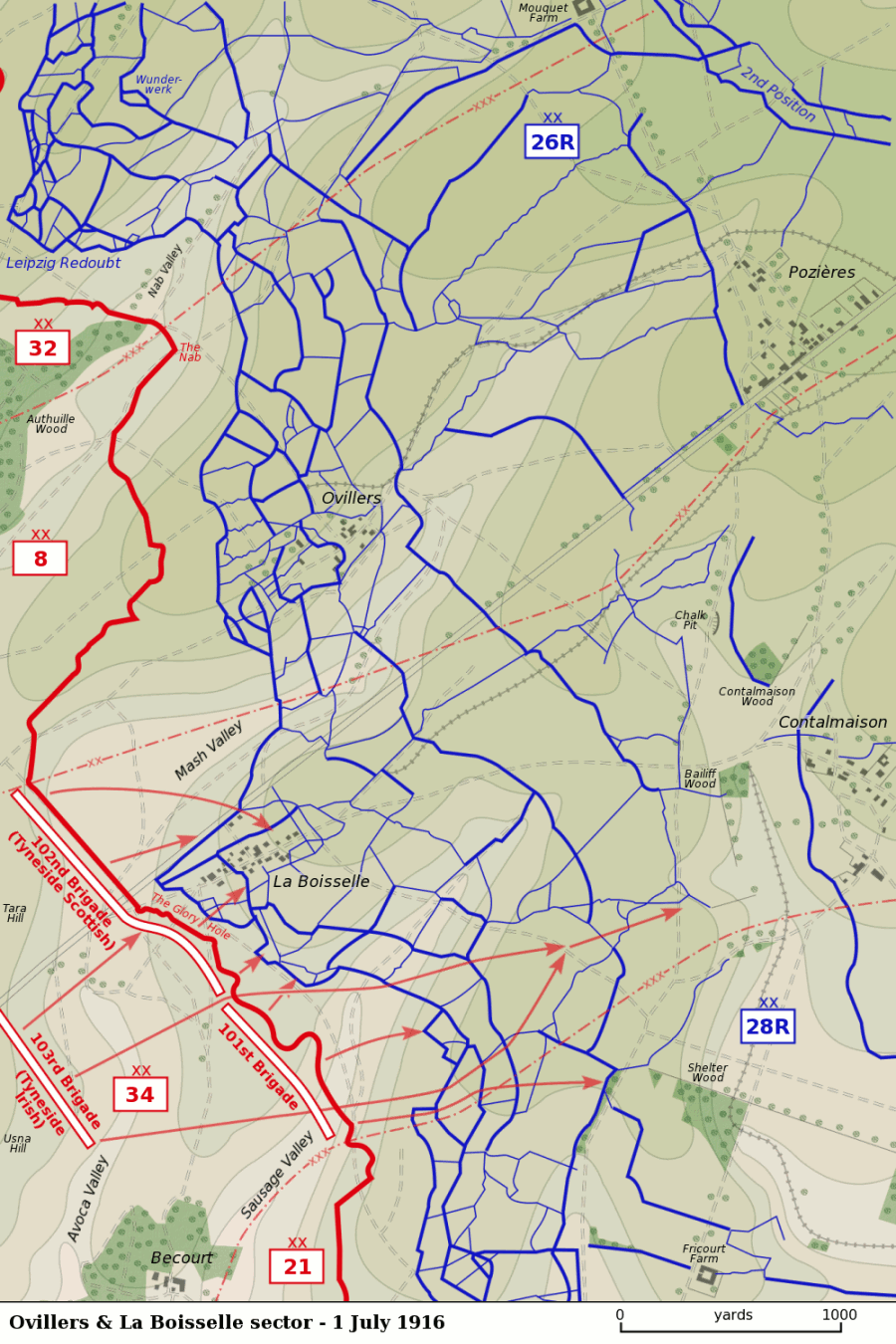
The 34th Division attack on La Boisselle

The 34th Division (New Army) was to attack along the Albert–Bapaume road, aided by the blowing of Lochnagar mine and Y Sap mine (the largest mine explosions of the day) either side of La Boisselle. The mine at Y Sap, north of the village, caused no casualties as the Germans had evacuated the area in time but the springing of the Lochnagar mine, south of the village, temporarily trapped German troops in shelters nearby and the position was lost. Parties of the Grimsby Chums got into the Lochnagar mine crater before being pinned down by German small-arms fire. The Tyneside Scottish Brigade was to attack up Mash Valley and against La Boisselle at the Glory Hole (L'îlot to the French and Granathof to the Germans). The Tyneside Irish were in reserve, ready to advance and capture the second objective from Contalmaison to Pozières.

At zero hour, the Tyneside Scottish Brigade started its advance from the Tara–Usna Line (a British reserve position behind the front line) to cross 1 mi (1.6 km) of open ground before they reached no man's land. Despite machine-gun fire, a party of around 50 men survived to advance up Sausage Valley, south of La Boisselle, almost to the edge of Contalmaison. The survivors were captured after making the furthest British advance of the day, about 4,000 yd (2.3 mi; 3.7 km). The positions of Reserve Infantry Regiment 110 had been severely damaged in the bombardment but the regiment was forewarned of the British attack by a Moritz device, which eavesdropped on British telephone signals and allowed the Germans to withdraw before the Y Sap mine exploded. The 34th Division suffered the worst casualties of the day, 6,380.

===== Ovillers =====
The 8th Division attacked the Ovillers spur, north of the Albert–Bapaume road. The division had to cross 750 yd (690 m) of no man's land and advance towards German trenches sited to exploit spurs running down from the ridge. The only approach to the German lines was up Mash Valley, under the guns in La Boisselle to the south, Ovillers to the front and the Thiepval spur to the north. All three brigades attacked, the 23rd Brigade up Mash Valley, where c. 200 men reached the German second trench and then held about 300 yd (270 m) of the front trench, until 9:15 a.m. The centre brigade reached the second line, before being forced back to the British front line and the left-hand brigade managed to reach the third trench, while German counter-bombardments cut off the leading troops from reinforcements. Co-ordination by the British artillery and infantry failed, the field artillery lifting to the final objective and the heavy artillery lifting an hour before the attack, leaving the German defenders unmolested as they repulsed the infantry. Ovillers was defended by Infantry Regiment 180, which had suffered 192 casualties in the bombardment. Many of the German defences were smashed, except on their right at The Nab. The British advance was met by massed small-arms fire at 100 yd (91 m), which cut down many men, after which a bombing fight began. British penetrations were contained by German troops in communication trenches on the flanks. The two battalions of the regiment in the area suffered 280 casualties and the 8th Division 5,121.

==== X Corps ====
===== Leipzig salient and Thiepval =====
The salient and Thiepval village were attacked by the New Army 32nd Division. The Glasgow Commercials advanced into no man's land at 7:23 a.m., until they were 30–40 yd (27–37 m) from the German front line. At zero hour, the British rushed the trench before the garrison could react and captured the Leipzig Redoubt. Attempts to exploit the success were met by machine-gun fire from the Wundtwerk (Wonderwork to the British) and the British were not able to advance further. The capture of the redoubt was the only permanent success in the northern sector. The 49th (West Riding) Division, in reserve, went forward mid-morning in support of the 32nd Division, although the commander, Major-General William Rycroft, had suggested that it would have more effect by reinforcing the success of the 36th (Ulster) Division. The 146th Brigade attacked Thiepval through the 32nd Division area and then the 49th (West Riding) Division was ordered to send any uncommitted battalions direct to the 36th (Ulster) Division. The area was defended by two battalions of Reserve Infantry Regiment 99, whose machine-gun posts survived the bombardment, which opened fire as soon as the British attacked. The 3rd Company, Infantry Regiment 180 was annihilated in hand-to-hand fighting at Leipzig Redoubt. The garrison of Thiepval emerged from the shelters and cellars of the village before the British arrived and cut them down with small-arms fire, leaving a "wall of dead" in front of the position. The 32nd Division suffered 3,949 casualties and the 49th (West Riding) Division 590.

===== Schwaben and Stuff redoubts =====
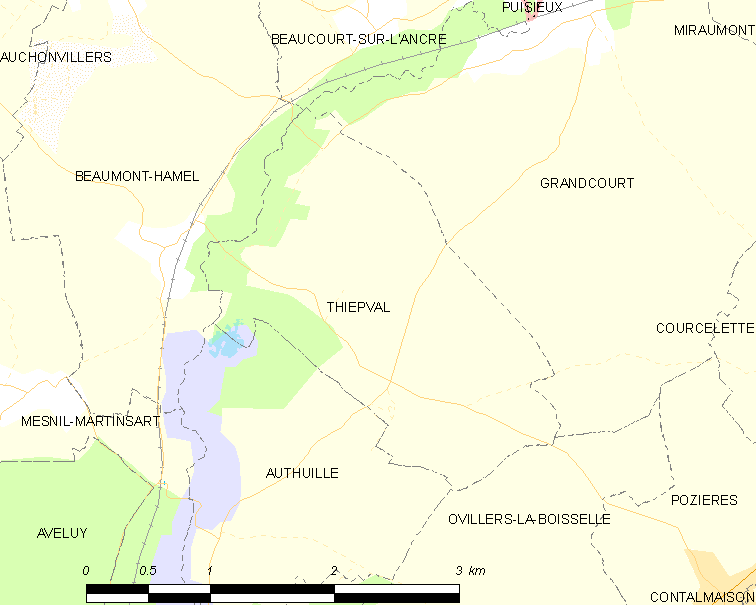
Modern map of Thiepval and vicinity (commune FR insee code 80753)

The 36th (Ulster) Division attacked between Thiepval and the Ancre River against Schwaben Redoubt and gained a "spectacular victory". The preliminary artillery bombardment, which included support from French batteries firing gas-shell and a smoke screen from trench mortars, was more successful than on other parts of the front north of the Albert–Bapaume road. The infantry crept into no man's land before the attack, rushed the German front trench and then pressed on. The defeat of the neighbouring divisions left the 36th (Ulster) Division flanks unsupported and the German defenders on either side were free to rake the division from three sides. German artillery began a barrage (Sperrfeuer) along no man's land which isolated the most advanced Irish troops, who briefly reached the German second line, captured Schwaben Redoubt and closed on Stuff redoubt.

Opposite the 36th (Ulster) Division was III Battalion, Reserve Infantry Regiment 99 (RIR 99) and I and III battalions of Bavarian Reserve Infantry Regiment 8 (BRIR 8). The German units suffered severe casualties due to the British bombardment, which destroyed much of the front position, particularly west of Schwaben Redoubt. The positions were so quickly overrun by the Irish that they received little return fire. II Battalion, BRIR 8 was ordered to recapture the redoubt but the order was delayed and all the troops that could be spared were sent to attack from Goat Redoubt and Grandcourt. In the confusion, few of the German troops were able to assemble; the counter-attack began piecemeal and was repulsed several times, until a bombardment and another attack by two fresh battalions at about 10:00 p.m., forced the Irish out of the redoubt. The 36th (Ulster) Division suffered 5,104 casualties.

==== VIII Corps ====
The northern flank of the Fourth Army was held by VIII Corps (Lieutenant-General Aylmer Hunter-Weston). Three divisions were to attack on the first day, with the 48th (South Midland) Division in reserve, except for two battalions that held a 1.6 mi (2.6 km) stretch between the Third and Fourth armies and two battalions that were attached to the 4th Division.

===== Beaumont-Hamel =====
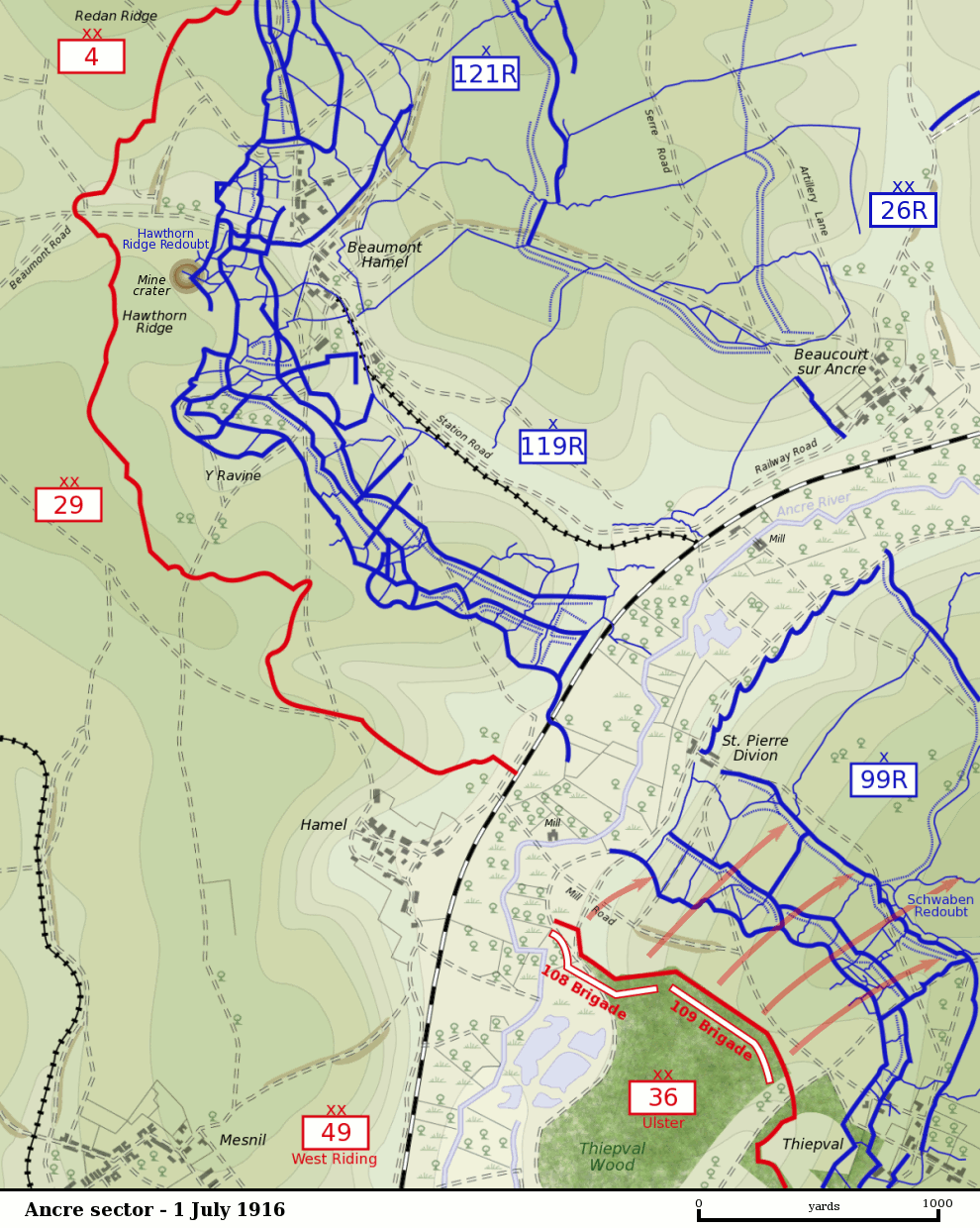
The Ancre and Beaumont Hamel, 1 July 1916

The 29th Division attacked towards Beaumont-Hamel. Part of the attack was filmed and showed the detonation of a 40,000 lb (18 long tons) mine beneath Hawthorn Ridge Redoubt at 7:20 a.m., ten minutes before the infantry attack. The detonation of the mine alerted the Germans and British troops failed to occupy all of the mine crater before German troops could take over the far lip. Many troops of both brigades were shot down in no man's land, which was dominated by Redan Ridge and then caught by German artillery barrages. White German signal rockets were seen and taken for British success flares, which led the divisional commander, Major-General Beauvoir De Lisle, to order the 88th Brigade from reserve to exploit the success. The brigade included the Newfoundland Regiment, which advanced on open ground from reserve trenches 200 yd (180 m) back from the British front line.

The Newfoundland advance avoided the congestion of dead and wounded in communication trenches but many of the troops became casualties to German small-arms fire while still behind their front line. Some Newfoundland troops got across no man's land near Y Ravine but were held up by uncut wire. Most of the German shelters and Beaumont-Hamel were derelict and shell-craters overlapped. Reserve Infantry Regiment 119, who had been sheltering under the village in Stollen survived and with other units at Leiling Schlucht (Y Ravine) and the Leiling and Bismarck dugouts, engaged the British troops from the wreckage of their trenches. The Newfoundlanders suffered 710 casualties, a 91 per cent loss, second only to that of the 10th Battalion, West Yorkshire Regiment, which suffered 733 casualties at Fricourt, south of the Albert–Bapaume road. The 29th Division suffered 5,240 casualties.

===== Serre =====
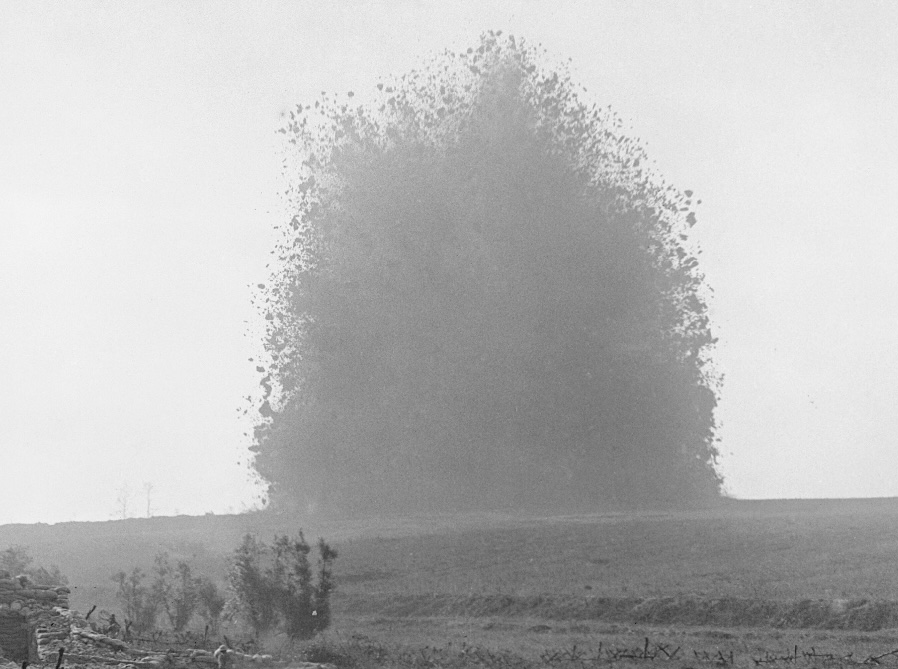
Explosion of the mine beneath Hawthorn Ridge Redoubt, 7:20 a.m. Photo by Ernest Brooks

The 4th Division attacked between Serre and Beaumont-Hamel, capturing the Quadrilateral (Heidenkopf) but could not exploit the success, because the Germans repulsed the attacks by the flanking divisions. Crossfire from Beaumont Hamel and Serre and determined counter-attacks held up the 4th Division. Parties of Lancashire Fusiliers, Seaforth Highlanders and troops from the 11th Brigade entered the Quadrilateral, where they were reinforced by a company of the Royal Irish Fusiliers during the night. Except at the Quadrilateral, the 4th Division ended the day back at its start line. No other gains were made and German counter-attacks overnight pushed the parties in the Quadrilateral back until only the Irish Fusiliers remained in the German front line, not having received an order to retreat early on 2 July. The Irish eventually withdrew at 11:30 a.m. with their wounded and three prisoners; the 4th Division suffered 5,752 casualties. In 2006, Grahame Kingston recorded 5,890 casualties in the division during July.

The 31st Division, a New Army division made up of Pals battalions, was to capture Serre and then turn north to form the northern defensive flank of the Fourth Army. The 31st Division attacked uphill from several copses and the two attacking brigades were engaged by the Germans with small-arms fire, expending 74,000 bullets against the attack. Small groups of the Accrington Pals and the Sheffield City Battalion managed to cross no man's land and reach Serre and a party advanced 1.25 mi (2.01 km) to Pendant Copse, before being cut off and killed or captured. Reserve Infantry Regiment 121 was confronted by the British attack before all the troops had emerged from their dugouts. More than three infantry sections were blown up in the mine explosion at Hawthorn Redoubt, the rest of the garrison being trapped until the end of the attack. A counter-attack towards the redoubt by two platoons gradually bombed the British back; after an hour only the troops in the Heidenkopf remained and it was re-captured during the night. Reserve Infantry Regiment 119 suffered 292 casualties, Reserve Infantry Regiment 121 560, Infantry Regiment 169 362; the 31st Division suffered 3,600 casualties.

=== British Third Army ===
The Third Army (General Edmund Allenby), was to mount a diversion north of the Fourth Army area, with VII Corps. At the Gommecourt Salient, the German trenches curved around a château and its parkland and a gap of 1 mi (1.6 km) separated the Gommecourt diversion from the northern edge of the main attack. Preparations for a pincer movement to catch the garrison in a pocket, were made as obvious as possible to attract German attention. The 56th (1/1st London) Division had prepared jumping-off trenches in no man's land and when the attack commenced at 7:30 a.m. swift progress was made. The first three German trenches were captured and a party pushed on towards the rendezvous with the 46th (North Midland) Division. A German barrage descended on no man's land, which made it impossible for reinforcements to move forward or for a trench to be dug as a defensive flank to the south and the survivors were forced to withdraw after dark. The 46th (North Midland) Division attack found that the German wire was uncut and the ground littered with unexploded mortar bombs. A smoke screen intended to mask the infantry obscured their view and left the Germans with observation over the attack. The ground was particularly wet and muddy and few troops reached the German trenches; the remaining British troops overran the front line, where German troops were able to emerge from shelters not mopped-up by the supporting battalions pinned down in no man's land by the German barrage and engage the British troops from behind.

The British bombardment cut much of the wire at Gommecourt and demolished many trenches, particularly in the area of Infantry Regiment 170 opposite the 56th (1/1st London) Division. The smoke screen obstructed the beginning of the attack and the damage caused by the bombardment blocked many dugout entrances; a counter-attack was swiftly mounted from Kern Redoubt (the Maze), which was not under attack. The counter-attack failed to stop the 56th (1/1st London) Division reaching the third line of trenches, before a converging attack by Infantry Regiment 170 and Reserve Infantry regiments 15 and 55 began. The British had consolidated and the counter-attack made little progress, until co-ordinated bombing attacks in the afternoon gradually recovered the position. Opposite the 46th (North Midland) Division, Reserve Infantry regiments 55 and 91 took post in time, engaged the attackers while they were crossing no man's land but failed to stop the loss of the front trench until a counter-attack from the third trench "annihilated" the leading British troops; the German regiments suffered 1,212 casualties. The 46th (North Midland) Division suffered 2,445 casualties, which was the lowest divisional loss on 1 July. The commander, Major-General Montagu-Stuart-Wortley, was dismissed for the failure. The 56th (1/1st London) Division suffered 4,314 casualties.

=== Air operations ===
British Photographic reconnaissance began in October 1915 and in March 1916 intensive British preparations commenced. The IV Brigade of the RFC was formed on 1 April 1916, with six squadrons of aeroplanes and a Kite Balloon squadron; the IV Brigade squadrons were the first to be increased from twelve to eighteen aircraft. On 25 April photographs were taken which revealed the German construction of a third position from Flers northwards to Le Sars, Pys, Irles, Achiet-le-Petit and Ablainzevelle. In mid-May and late June, the German defences opposite the Fourth Army were photographed again. Die Fliegertruppen des Deutschen Kaiserreiches (Imperial German Flying Service) had six reconnaissance flights (Feldflieger-Abteilungen) with 42 aircraft, four artillery flights (Artillerieflieger-Abteilungen) with 17 aeroplanes, a bomber-fighter squadron (Kampfgeschwader I) with 43 aircraft a bomber-fighter flight (Kampfstaffel 32) with 8 aeroplanes and a single-seater fighter detachment (Kampfeinsitzer-Kommando) with 19 aircraft, a strength of 129 aeroplanes.

The IV Brigade corps aircraft were to be protected with line patrols, comprising pairs of aircraft from the army squadrons and offensive sweeps by formations of DH 2 fighters. The concentration of aircraft for the offensive was completed by the arrival on 19 June of the Ninth (headquarters) Wing with three squadrons and one flight, which brought the number of aircraft on the Fourth Army front to 167, plus eighteen at Gommecourt. (Note: The Ninth Wing was under the command of RFC headquarters and operated as a mobile reserve, conducting strategic reconnaissance, offensive operations against Die Fliegertruppen and long-range bombing.) The bombing offensive by the RFC was intended to cut railway links behind the Somme front, south of the Valenciennes–Arras railway and west of the lines around Douai, Busigny and Tergnier. Trains were to be attacked in cuttings, railway bridges were to be bombed and the stations at Cambrai, Busigny, St Quentin and Tergnier were to be raided along with the German ammunition depots at Mons, Namur; the station at Lille was also to be attacked. British aircraft and kite balloons were to be used to observe the intermittent bombardment, which began in mid-June and the preliminary bombardment, which commenced on 24 June. Low cloud and rain obstructed air observation of the bombardment, which soon fell behind schedule. On 25 June, aircraft of the four British Armies on the Western Front attacked the German kite balloons opposite; fifteen were attacked, four were shot down by rockets and one bombed, three of the balloons being in the Fourth Army area. Next day three more balloons were shot down opposite the Fourth Army and during German artillery reply to the Anglo-French bombardment, 102 German artillery positions were plotted and a Fokker was shot down near Courcelette.

Accurate observation was not possible at dawn on 1 July due to patches of mist but by 6:30 a.m. the general effect of the Anglo-French bombardment could be seen. Observers in contact-patrol aircraft could see lines of British infantry crawling into no man's land, ready to attack the German front trench at 7:30 a.m. Each corps and division had a wireless receiving-station for messages from airborne artillery-observers and ground observers were stationed at various points, to receive messages and maps dropped from aircraft. As contact observers reported the progress of the infantry attack, artillery-observers sent many messages to the British artillery and reported the effect of counter-battery fire on German guns. Balloon observers used their telephones to report changes in the German counter-barrage and to direct British artillery on fleeting targets, reporting during the night by flash spotting. Air reconnaissance during the day found little movement on the roads and railways behind the German front; the railways at Bapaume were bombed from 5:00 a.m. Flights to Cambrai, Busigny and Etreux later in the day saw no unusual movement, although German aircraft attacked the observation aircraft all the way to the targets and back, two Rolands being shot down by the escorts. Bombing began the evening before with a raid on the station at St Saveur by six R.E. 7s of 21 Squadron, whose pilots claimed hits on sheds and a second raid around 6:00 a.m. on 1 July hit the station and railway lines; both attacks were escorted and two Fokkers were shot down on the second raid.

Railway bombing was conducted by 28 aircraft, each with two 112 lb (51 kg) bombs, at intervals after midday; Cambrai station was hit with seven bombs, for the loss of one aircraft. In the early evening an ammunition train was hit on the line between Aubigny-au-Bac and Cambrai and set on fire, the cargo burning and exploding for several hours. Raids on St Quentin and Busigny were reported to be failures by the crews and three aircraft were lost. (Note: German prisoners captured by the French army later in July, reported that they were at the station during the bombing, which hit an ammunition shed near 200 ammunition wagons. Sixty wagons caught fire, exploded and destroyed the troop train and two battalions' worth of equipment piled on the platform, killing or wounding 180 troops. Reserve Infantry Regiment 71 had to be sent back to Etreillers and then Ham to re-equip.) All corps aircraft carried 20 lb (9.1 kg) bombs to attack billets, transport, trenches and artillery-batteries. Offensive sweeps were flown by 27 and 60 squadrons from 11:30 a.m. to 7:00 p.m. but found few German aircraft and only an LVG was forced down. Two sets of line patrols were flown, one by 24 Squadron DH.2s from Péronne to Pys and Gommecourt from 6:45 a.m. to nightfall, which met six German aircraft during the day and forced two down. The second set of patrols by pairs of F.E.2bs were made by 22 Squadron between 4:12 a.m. and dusk, from Longueval to Cléry and Douchy to Miraumont. for a loss of two aircraft and one damaged but prevented attacks on the corps aircraft.

XIII Corps was watched by most of 9 Squadron, which saw the 30th Division troops take the line Dublin Trench–Glatz Redoubt by 8:30 a.m. and the 18th (Eastern) Division take Pommiers Trench and Pommiers Redoubt. At 10:00 a.m. an observer saw a line of flashes on the ground from mirrors carried by 30th Division soldiers on their packs as the British troops moved along Train Alley towards Montauban. A German artillery battery began to fire from Bernafay Wood and the pilot machine-gunned the crews from 700 ft (210 m), putting the battery out of action. On return towards the British lines, the crew saw Montauban being occupied and 18th (Eastern) Division troops advancing up the ridge to the west of the village, the pilot flew low along the ridge and gave the troops a wave. By 11:15 a.m. mirrors were seen flashing along the north edge of Montauban.

The XV Corps attack on either side of Fricourt was observed by parts of 3 and 9 squadrons, which were able to report by evening that the 21st Division and the 34th Division to the north had advanced deeply into the German defensive positions above Fricourt. The 7th Division had advanced beyond Mametz, forming a defensive flank on the left and linking on the right with XIII Corps. Troops from III Corps and XV Corps lit red flares, which were quickly reported by observers in contact-patrol aircraft. A balloon observer from 3 Kite Balloon Section was able to get the artillery to re-bombard Danzig Alley, after British troops were forced out by a German counter-attack, a second British attack in the afternoon took the trench easily. Most of 3 Squadron watched over the disastrous III Corps attack at La Boisselle and Ovillers and saw some 34th Division troops reach Peake Wood north of Fricourt.

The attacks by X Corps and VIII Corps, from Thiepval to Serre were observed by crews from 4 and 15 squadrons. Ground observers could see much of the battle and communications were better than on other parts of the front. Some of the deeper British infantry advances could only be seen from the air, particularly those at Schwaben Redoubt and Pendant Copse. 4 Squadron reported the hurried withdrawal of German artillery between Courcelette and Grandcourt during the afternoon and spotted the massing of German troops at 4:30 p.m. A special flight was sent to Thiepval and the pilot flew by at 600 ft (180 m) to examine the ground and report that the British attacks had failed. With 15 Squadron observing the disaster occurring to VIII Corps around Beaumont Hamel, the defeat of the British attacks and the repulse of the troops from the few areas where break-ins had occurred were reported by the aircraft observers.

The VII Corps attack was observed by 8 Squadron, which had photographed during clear weather the day before. The attack of the 46th (North Midland) and 56th (1/1st London) divisions, had a standing patrol of one aircraft each from 6:45 a.m. to 3:25 p.m. and then one aircraft for both divisions. No red infantry flares were seen and aircraft flew through the barrage to make visual identifications at low level; by the end of the day German ground fire had made three aircraft unserviceable. One aeroplane flew into a balloon cable near St Amand, damaging the aircraft; the crew escaping unhurt. Reports from the observation crews related the fate of the leading troops of the 46th (North Midland) Division, who were cut off after over-running the German first line by German troops emerging from underground shelters. Following waves intended to mop-up the German front line were seen pinned down in no man's land by artillery and machine-gun barrages. On the 56th (1/1st London) Division front, observers watched the leading British troops capture the first, second and third lines before being cut off by another German barrage in no man's land. German infantry were seen to mass and then counter-attack, regaining the third line by midday, the second line by afternoon and the first line late in the evening.

=== German 2nd Army ===
By May 1916, eight German divisions held the front from Roye northwards to Arras with three in reserve. The German defence of the south bank of the Somme was the responsibility of XVII Corps (General Günther von Pannewitz (General)), with three divisions. On the north bank the XIV Reserve Corps (Generalleutnant Hermann von Stein) with two divisions held the line from the Somme to the Ancre and the Guard Corps (General Karl von Plettenberg) with three divisions held the ground north of the Ancre opposite Serre and Gommecourt. On 20 June, British heavy artillery bombarded German communications behind the front line as far back as Bapaume and then continued intermittently until the evening of 22 June. At dawn on 24 June, a shrapnel barrage began on the German front position and villages nearby. At noon, more accurate fire began before increasing in intensity around Thiepval as heavy batteries commenced firing and in the evening, a light rain turned the German positions to mud.

On 25 June, heavy artillery-fire predominated, smashing trenches and blocking dugouts. Variations in the intensity of fire indicated likely areas to be attacked; the greatest weight of fire occurring at Mametz, Fricourt and Ovillers; during the night the German commanders prepared their defences around the villages and ordered the second line to be manned. After an overnight lull, the bombardment increased again on 26 June, gas being discharged at 5:00 a.m. towards Beaumont Hamel and Serre, before the bombardment increased in intensity near Thiepval, then suddenly stopped. The German garrison took post and fired red rockets to call for artillery support, which placed a barrage in no man's land. Later in the afternoon huge mortar bombs began to fall, destroying shallower dug-outs, a super-heavy gun began to bombard the main German strong-points, as smaller guns pulverised the villages close to the front line, from which civilians were hurriedly removed.

German troops billeted in the villages moved into the open to avoid the shelling and on 27 and 28 June, heavy rain added to the devastation, as the bombardment varied from steady accurate shelling to shell-storms and periods of quiet. At night British patrols moved into no man's land; prisoners taken by the Germans said that they were checking on the damage and searching for German survivors. German interrogators gleaned information suggesting that an offensive would come either side of the Somme and Ancre rivers at 5:00 a.m. on 29 June. All of the German infantry stood to with reinforcements but the bombardment resumed in the afternoon, rising to drumfire several times. Artillery-fire concentrated on small parts of the front, then lines of shells moved forward into the depth of the German defences. Periodic gas discharges and infantry probes continued but German sentries watching through periscopes were often able to warn the garrisons in time to react. The bombardment on 30 June repeated the pattern of the earlier days, by when, much of the German surface defences had been swept away, look-out shelters and observation posts were in ruins and many communication trenches had disappeared.

On the night of 30 June /1 July, the bombardment fell on rear defences and communication trenches; at dawn British aircraft "filled the sky", captive balloons rose into the air at 6:30 a.m. and an unprecedented barrage began all along the German front, until 7:30 a.m., when the bombardment abruptly stopped. The remaining German trench garrisons began to leave their shelters and set up machine-guns in the remains of trenches and shell-holes, which proved difficult to spot and allowed the occupants to change direction, easily to face threats from all directions. Where the British infantry advanced close behind the barrage the German defenders were often overrun and at Montauban, Mametz and around Fricourt, the Germans were rushed while most were still underground. Further north, the Germans had time to emerge and stopped most attacks in no man's land.

The 26th Reserve Division held a front of 9,000 yd (5.1 mi; 8.2 km), from Ovillers to Serre, four regiments occupied the first line with two battalions each, one in the support line and one in reserve. The Germans emerged to see lines of British infantry in no man's land and opened rapid fire on them, lines and waves falling down, reforming and moving forward. Some German infantry stood on trench parapets to aim better and red rockets were fired to call for artillery barrages on no man's land, which shattered the British infantry formations. The survivors kept going and began a bombing fight close to the German line, which was defeated, except at the Leipzig Redoubt, which was quickly sealed off by German flanking parties and between Thiepval and the Ancre, where the Irish advanced towards Grandcourt 3,000 yd (1.7 mi; 2.7 km) away. Counter-attacks forced the British back to the German front trench after dark.

== Aftermath ==
=== Analysis ===
Robin Prior and Trevor Wilson wrote that the conventional account of the day has soldiers burdened by 66 lb (30 kg) of equipment, obeying "doltish" orders to walk shoulder-to-shoulder towards the German lines and being mown down by German machine-gunners, who had time to climb out of shelters and man the parapet. Prior and Wilson ascribed the origin of this narrative to John Buchan in The Battle of the Somme (1917) in which the bravery of soldiers is extolled, rather than faulty infantry tactics being criticised. Prior and Wilson traced the narrative through the writing of B. H. Liddell Hart, J. E. Edmonds the official historian, C. R. M. F. Cruttwell, Martin Middlebrook, Correlli Barnett and Paul Kennedy. In 1970, Anthony Farrar-Hockley questioned the narrative but reverted to the orthodox view soon after. (Note: J. Buchan The Battle of the Somme, B. H. Liddell Hart The Real War, J. E. Edmonds, Military Operations: 1916, volume I, C. R. M. F. Cruttwell, A History of the Great War 1914–1918, Martin Middlebrook The First Day on the Somme, Correlli Barnett The Great War, Paul Kennedy Britain, Anthony Farrar-Hockley, The Somme.) Prior and Wilson did not dispute the facts of c. 20,000 dead and c. 40,000 wounded but wrote that the Tactical Notes issued by Rawlinson did not dictate the way that advances were to be made but were "ambiguous", referring to "celerity of movement", "a steady pace" and "a rapid advance of some lightly-equipped men" and did not prescribe a formation to be adopted for the advance. (Note: The "ambiguity" of the Tactical Notes is open to question, since the three conditions Prior and Wilson describe are exceptions to the "general form of attack", to exploit a temporary disorganisation of the defence, to advance to the final objective and possibly use lightly equipped troops to rush a vital part of the defensive position at a crucial moment.)

At the northern end of the British front, the leading brigade of the 31st Division advanced into no man's land before zero hour, to rush the German front trench when the barrage lifted. Some units of the 4th Division advanced from the British front line in formations led by snipers and skirmishers. In the 29th Division some battalions "marched" to the German wire and others rushed forward from assembly-trenches dug in no man's land. In the 36th (Ulster), 32nd and 8th division areas, some battalions assembled in front of the German wire, ready to rush forward at zero hour and many of the battalions of XV Corps and XIII Corps walked slowly forward in lines behind a creeping barrage. Of 80 battalions in the initial attack, 53 crept into no man's land, ten rushed from the British front trench and twelve advanced at a steady pace behind a creeping barrage. Prior and Wilson found that the behaviour of the British infantry had less effect than the behaviour of the German infantry, which was determined by the fire of the British guns. Where the German defences and garrisons had been destroyed, the British infantry succeeded. When significant numbers of German machine-gunners survived, especially when supported by artillery, the British attack failed. On the French front, the artillery preparation was almost wholly effective in destroying German defences and killing German infantry in their underground shelters. The prevalence and effectiveness of killing-machines determined the result and in such an environment, a soldier with a bayonet was obsolete and infantry formations irrelevant.

In 2009, J. P. Harris described the success of the French, XIII Corps and XV Corps, the extent of British casualties for ground gained and Haig's responsibility for the British casualties. Harris wrote of the inferior German defences on the French front, surprise, superior French artillery and better infantry tactics than those of the British. The French attacked in the south, as did the two most successful British corps, in this area only the first line was an objective. Harris wrote that the German 2nd Army was often ignored in analyses of the First Day and that the main defensive effort was made in the north, the area of greatest German success. Terrain in the south, Anglo-French air superiority and closer objectives, tended to concentrate Allied artillery-fire, which was better-observed and more accurate than on the hillier ground to the north.

In the south, barbed wire was cut, the German fortifications were "exceptionally" damaged and a crude form of creeping barrage preceded the infantry to their objectives. Harris held Haig responsible for the extension of the objectives in the north to the German second position, which diluted the density of British artillery-fire, although no study had been made of the details of the preliminary bombardment and caution must accompany a conclusion that bombardment of the closer objectives was unduly dissipated. Harris concluded that the attack front was too broad and that Rawlinson should be held responsible with Haig for attempting to advance on a 16 mi (26 km) front. Despite being under no diplomatic pressure from the French or political pressure from London to obtain swift success, the British tried to do too much too quickly, unlike the French Sixth Army which made short advances with the support of massive amounts of artillery-fire.

In 2009, William Philpott wrote that the post-war French Official History gave five pages to 1 July, with one paragraph on the British attack and that the German official history Der Weltkrieg covered the day in 62 pages. The British Official History described the day in 177 pages, with one page on the French success. In Joffre's memoirs the French victory was ascribed to "the excellent work of the artillery" and German underestimation of French offensive power due to the Battle of Verdun, leading them to make their principal defensive effort in the north. Many British infantry had been attacked from behind, after failing to mop up captured German positions. This military explanation was insufficient for many British commentators, who blamed "anachronistic" "sword wavers" for leading volunteers to an unnecessary slaughter. The French success, based on the experience of 1915 was overlooked, as was the French expectation of more quick victories being disappointed, as the battle became a counterpart to the long attrition campaign at Verdun. Philpott also described the Germans being written out of the British narrative of useless sacrifice. The Anglo-French armies had gained an advantage on 1 July by forcing the collapse of the German defences for 13 mi (21 km), either side of the Somme.. In the early afternoon a broad breach existed north of the river but the "break in" was in an unexpected place and exploitation had to be improvised.

=== Casualties ===
Philpott wrote that the "gory scene" behind the British front showed that something had gone wrong. In the evening of 1 July, Haig wrote in his diary,

North of the Ancre, VIII Division (sic) said they began well but as the day progressed, their troops were forced back into the German front line, except two battalions which occupied Serre village and were, it is said, cut off. I am inclined to believe from further reports that few of VIII Corps left their trenches.

VIII Corps had left their trenches and over 14,000 men became casualties. Edmonds wrote that for the loss of Britain and Ireland's "finest manhood" there was only a small gain of ground, although an advance of 1 mi (1.6 km) on a 3.5 mi (5.6 km) front and minor advances elsewhere, was the furthest achieved by the British since trench warfare began. Only 1,983 unwounded prisoners had been taken and none of the captured ground north of the Albert–Bapaume road, except at the Leipzig Redoubt, had been held. Before the battle, Rawlinson had requested 18 ambulance trains but only three were provided and these departed part-filled, before many of the wounded had been brought to casualty clearing stations, which had capacity for only 9,500 cases. Casualties were left untended in the open and it was not until 4 July that the Fourth Army medical services had treated all the wounded (some casualties reached hospitals in England still wearing field dressings). As night fell, survivors began to make their way back to the British trenches and stretcher-bearers went into no man's land. Major-General Ingouville-Williams, commander of the 34th Division, participated in the search and some medical orderlies continued after dawn broke. At Beaumont-Hamel, two British medical officers arranged a truce and in other places movement in no man's land was fired on. Victoria Crosses were awarded to Robert Quigg and Geoffrey Cather (posthumous) for rescuing wounded.

Some casualties survived for up to a week in no man's land, scavenging rations from the dead before being rescued. At 7:30 p.m., the Fourth Army headquarters believed that there had been 16,000 casualties, by 3 July the staff thought that there had been 40,000 and by 6 July the count had risen to 60,000 men. The Third Army diversion at Gommecourt cost VII Corps 6,758 casualties against 1,212 German. The final total of 57,470 British casualties, 19,240 of whom had been killed, was not calculated for some time; the French Sixth Army suffered 1,590 casualties and the German 2nd Army suffered 10,000–12,000 casualties. In 1971 Martin Middlebrook wrote that whereas German units normally submitted a casualty return every ten days, many submitted a special daily return for 1 July. It is possible to estimate that German forces on the British sector (including Gommecourt) suffered 6,000 killed or wounded and 2,200 taken prisoner. In 2013, Ralph Whitehead wrote that from 1 to 10 July, the 2nd Army commanded 21 divisions, the original divisions present on 1 July and reinforcements, with a ration strength of 469,585 men. In the ten-day reporting period (10 tägigen Truppenkrankenrapporten) from 1 to 10 July 7,539 men reported sick, 22,095 were recorded as wounded and 24,244 men were listed as killed or missing, leaving 5,786 men recorded as killed; during the same period 5,273 men returned to duty. For 1 July 1916,

The lists represent 20,790 names of the men who most likely fought on the Somme in early July. Of these 6,226 can be identified as having been killed, wounded, injured or captured on 1 July 1916. An additional 1,912 can positively [be] identified as having become a casualty before or after this date. Of the remainder, 12,642 names, only time will tell if the details of their fate can be established.

=== Subsequent operations ===
Haig visited the Fourth Army headquarters and discussed the continuation of the attack on 2 July, although in the confused situation the original plan was not changed. Pressure was to be maintained on the Germans to inflict losses and reach ground from which to attack the German second position, with particular emphasis on the capture of Fricourt. Gough, with the Reserve Army ready to exploit a gap was not called on and at 7:00 p.m. Rawlinson requested that he take over X Corps and VIII Corps, to reorganise the front astride the Ancre. The 12th (Eastern) Division was sent to relieve the 8th Division and the 25th Division was moved closer to X Corps. Haig ordered the 23rd and 38th (Welsh) divisions to move towards the Somme front and at 10:00 p.m. the Fourth Army headquarters ordered all corps to continue the attack. Local conditions south of the Albert–Bapaume road led many officers to urge that the German defeat in the area to be exploited with fresh divisions but XIII Corps was ordered to consolidate and prepare to attack Mametz Wood with XV Corps, which was to capture Fricourt and advance towards Contalmaison, still thought to have been captured. III Corps was ordered to attack La Boisselle and Ovillers again and reach Contalmaison and X Corps and VIII Corps were ordered to capture all of the German first position and reach the intermediate line.

In the afternoon of 1 July, the German survivors of the 28th Reserve Division and 12th Division and part of the 10th Bavarian Division at Montauban Ridge, had been driven back to the Braune Stellung (second position) from Ginchy to Longueval and Bazentin le Grand. The 12th Division arrived in the evening from Bapaume, was sent towards Combles and Ginchy and at 6:45 p.m., a counter-attack was ordered to regain Montauban Ridge, between Favières Wood and Montauban. One regiment was to advance past the north end of Combles to Guillemont and re-capture the north end of Montauban, a regiment in the centre was to retake Favières Wood and the left regiment was to advance along the north bank of the Somme between Curlu and Maurepas, troops joining in from the second position. Dawn broke at 3:00 a.m. on 2 July, well before the advance reached Bernafay Wood and a British barrage quickly forced back the Germans into Caterpillar Valley. At La Briqueterie the German infantry were quickly repulsed, as was their attack along the river by French infantry south of Favières Wood. The 12th Division suffered many casualties and was withdrawn to the Grüne Stellung (Green Position) around Maltz Horn Farm, an intermediate position in front of the Braune Stellung.

== Commemoration ==
For Newfoundland, the first day of battle changed the course of the island's history, ending any hope of independence. After the war the Newfoundland government bought 40 acres (16 ha) at the site of the battalion's attack and created the Newfoundland Memorial Park to commemorate the dead, which was opened by Haig on 7 June 1925. Although the rest of Canada celebrates Canada Day on 1 July, it remains Memorial Day in Newfoundland and Labrador.

== Victoria Cross ==
- Eric Bell, 9th Battalion Royal Inniskilling Fusiliers at Thiepval — posthumous.
- Geoffrey Cather, 9th Battalion Royal Irish Fusiliers at Hamel — posthumous.
- John Green, Royal Army Medical Corps (att. 1/5th Battalion Sherwood Foresters) at Foncquevillers — posthumous.
- Stewart Loudoun-Shand, 10th Battalion Alexandra, Princess of Wales's Own (Yorkshire Regiment) at Fricourt — posthumous.
- William McFadzean, 14th Battalion Royal Irish Rifles at Thiepval Wood — posthumous.
- Robert Quigg, 12th Battalion Royal Irish Rifles at Hamel.
- Walter Ritchie, 2nd Battalion Seaforth Highlanders (Ross-shire Buffs, Duke of Albany's) at Beaumont Hamel.
- George Sanders, 1/7th Battalion West Yorkshire Regiment (The Prince of Wales's Own) at Thiepval.
- James Turnbull, 17th Battalion Highland Light Infantry at Authuille — posthumous.
