= John Leslie Green =

Recipient of the Victoria Cross (1888–1916)

- Captain J.L.Green
- Born: 4 December 1888; Buckden, Huntingdonshire, England
- Died: 1 July 1916 (aged 27); Foncquevillers, France
- Burial place: Foncquevillers Military (CWGC) Cemetery
- Military career
- Allegiance: United Kingdom
- Branch: British Army
- Service years: 1914–1916 †
- Rank: Captain
- Units: The Sherwood Foresters
- Conflicts: First World War: Battle of Loos; Battle of the Somme; First day on the Somme †
- Awards: Victoria Cross

John Leslie Green VC (4 December 1888 – 1 July 1916) was an English recipient of the Victoria Cross, the highest and most prestigious award for gallantry in the face of the enemy that can be awarded to British and Commonwealth forces. An officer in the Royal Army Medical Corps, he served on attachment to The Sherwood Foresters during the First World War. He was posthumously awarded the VC for his actions on 1 July 1916, during the Battle of the Somme.

== Early life ==
John Leslie Green was born in Buckden, Huntingdonshire, on 4 December 1888 to John George and Florence May Green. His father owned land in the area and was also a Justice of the Peace. Known as Leslie to his family, Green attended Felsted School, and went on to study at Downing College, Cambridge. Pursuing a career as a doctor, he studied medicine at St Bartholomew's Hospital in London. He later worked at Huntingdon County Hospital, becoming qualified as a medical doctor in 1911.

== First World War ==
After the outbreak of the First World War in the summer of 1914, Green was commissioned into the Royal Army Medical Corps. The early part of his military career was spent attached to the South Staffordshire Regiment as a medical officer before being transferred to the Field Ambulance. He was promoted to captain in April 1915. He was later posted to the Sherwood Foresters with which he went to France as part of the 46th (North Midland) Division, which fought in the Battle of Loos in September–October 1915. His brother, Second Lieutenant Edward Alan Green, who was serving in the 1/5th Battalion of the South Staffordshire Regiment, also part of the 46th Division, was killed in the battle.

On the first day of the Battle of the Somme, the 46th Division was tasked with capturing Gommecourt Wood and then linking up the 56th (London) Division which had been allocated the objective of Gommecourt Park, to the south. This was a diversionary attack, designed to draw German forces away from the battlefield further south. Beginning its advance at 7:25 am, the Sherwood Foresters had great difficulty moving forward due to heavy machinegun fire coming from Gommecourt Wood. Green, at the rear of the battalion, came across Captain Frank Robinson, who had been wounded and become entangled in barbed wire. Under heavy machine gun fire, Green extracted Robinson to a nearby shellhole and performed initial treatment on the wounds before carrying him back to British lines. Robinson was wounded again during this process and Green was killed by gunfire to the head while attending to his latest wound. Although Robinson was taken to hospital for treatment, he died of his wounds two days later. Captain Robinson, 23, was a company commander with the 1/6th Battalion Sherwood Foresters, and was from Brampton, Chesterfield, Derbyshire. His father, Major William Robinson, was a well-known businessman and a previous mayor of Chesterfield. Captain Robinson had been in the army for four years and was regarded as both daring and courageous ('Derbyshire Times' July 8, 1916).

For his actions on 1 July 1916, Green was awarded the Victoria Cross (VC). The VC, instituted in 1856, was the highest award for valour that could be bestowed on a serviceman of the British Empire. The citation for his VC reads:

"Capt. John Leslie Green, late R.A.M.C.

For most conspicuous devotion to duty. Although himself wounded, he went to the assistance of an officer who had been wounded and was hung up on the enemy's wire entanglements, and succeeded in dragging him to a shell hole, where he dressed his wounds, notwithstanding that bombs and rifle grenades were thrown at him the whole time.

Captain Green then endeavoured to bring the wounded officer into safe cover, and had nearly succeeded in doing so when he was himself killed."

— London Gazette, No. 29695, 4 August 1916

Green is buried at Foncquevillers Military Cemetery. In 1921, Green's father built a memorial to the men of Buckden village who had been killed in the war and the names of his two sons are listed; they are also on the roll of honour in the village church. He appears on war memorials in Houghton where there is also a Leslie Green Road. Green is also remembered by plaques at Felsted School and the Royal Army Medical Corps College in London.

== Victoria Cross ==
Green had married Edith Moss, also a doctor, earlier in the year in January and she was presented with Green's VC by King George V on 7 October 1916. She later remarried and gifted the medal to the RAMC. It is displayed at the Museum of Military Medicine in Mytchett, Surrey.
