= Foncquevillers Military Cemetery =

WWI CWGC Cemetery in Pas-de-Calais, France

- Commonwealth War Graves Commission
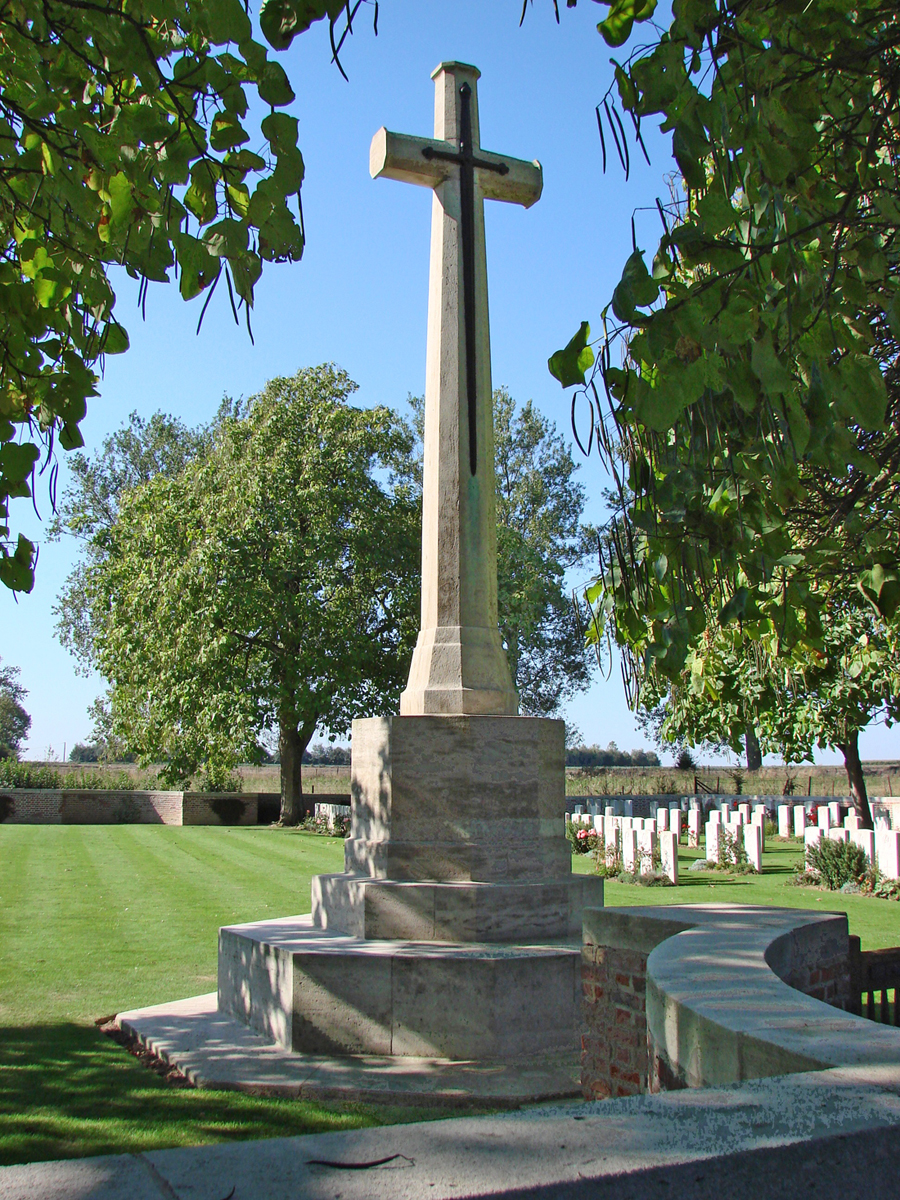
- Used for those deceased 1915–1918; 1944
- Established: 1915
- Location: 50°08′57″N 02°37′33″E near Bapaume, France
- Designed by: Sir Reginald Blomfield
- Total burials: 658
- Unknowns: 53

Burials by nation
- Allied Powers: United Kingdom: 577; New Zealand: 12; Australia: 6; Canada: 5; France: 1 (civilian); Germany: 4 Unknown: 53

Burials by war
- * First World War: 652: Second World War: 5; Postwar period: 1 (French)

Foncquevillers Military Cemetery is a Commonwealth War Graves Commission burial ground for military personnel who died on the Western Front during the First World War. It is located in the Pas de Calais region of France. Originally established in 1915 by the French military for its soldiers, it was later used for British personnel. Designed by Sir Reginald Blomfield and administered by the Commonwealth War Graves Commission (CWGC), there are 648 soldiers of the First World War interred in the cemetery with 53 of them unidentified. Another four graves are for German soldiers of the First World War, while five Canadian airmen who died in the Second World War and a French civilian are also buried in the cemetery.

== History ==
Foncquevillers is a village on the D6, northwest of Gommecourt, held by the Germans for much of the First World War and the scene of intensive fighting on the opening day of the Battle of the Somme, and Bapaume. In 1915, the frontlines were between Allied-controlled Foncquevillers and Gommecourt.

== Foundation ==
The cemetery was initially started by French soldiers in early 1915 on the western outskirts of Foncquevillers. The British took responsibility for the area in the summer of 1915 and it was used by the units and field ambulances stationed in the area until March 1917. During the German spring offensive of March–April 1918, it was brought back into use due to the fighting that occurred in the area.

After the war, the graves of 325 French soldiers interred in the cemetery were moved to the La Targette National Cemetery, near Arras. At the same time, 74 graves of British personnel killed in the area to the east of Foncquevillers in the fighting of 1916 and 1918 were consolidated to the cemetery.

== Cemetery ==
Designed by the English architect Sir Reginald Blomfield and administered by the Commonwealth War Graves Commission, the Foncquevillers Military Cemetery is located on the Rue Bacon, a road running to the northeast of village of Foncquevillers.

The main entrance is along the north wall of the cemetery and immediately inwards of this, a Cross of Sacrifice is located. A Stone of Remembrance is positioned in the northeast corner of the cemetery. Along the north wall, is a memorial to two soldiers whose graves are believed to be among those unidentified.

The cemetery contains the remains of 657 military personnel and one French civilian who died in the postwar period. Some 648 interments are Allied personnel of the First World War, of which 595 are identified. Of these 577 are British, 12 are soldiers of the New Zealand Expeditionary Force while there are six personnel of the Australian Imperial Force. There are also four German soldiers buried in the cemetery although two of these are among the 53 unidentified burials. There are also five Canadian airmen who died in June 1944, during the Second World War, buried in the cemetery. A notable burial at Foncquevillers is Captain John Leslie Green, a Victoria Cross recipient who was killed in action on 1 July 1916.
