= Robert Quigg =

Irish WWI recipient of the VC

Robert Quigg VC
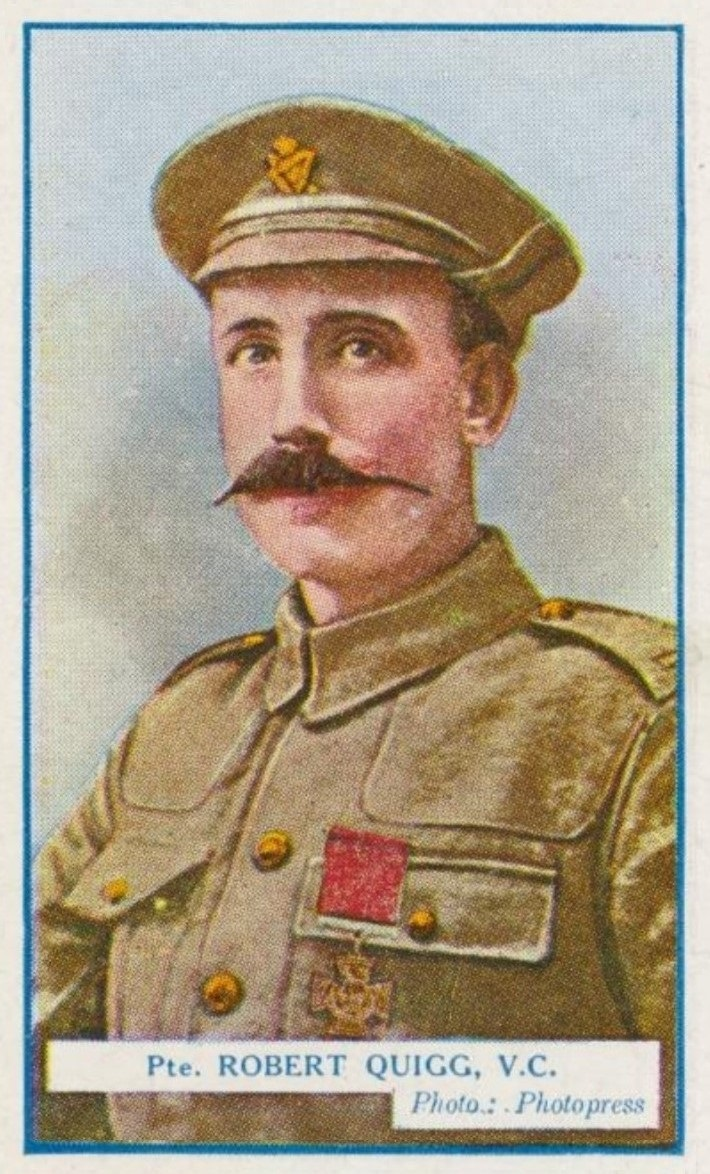
- Quigg depicted on a cigarette card
- Born: 28 February 1885; Ardihannon, County Antrim, Ireland
- Died: 14 May 1955 (aged 70); Ballycastle, County Antrim, Northern Ireland
- Burial place: Billy Parish Churchyard
- Military career
- Allegiance: United Kingdom
- Branch: British Army
- Service years: 1914–1926
- Rank: Sergeant
- Service number: 12/18645
- Unit: Royal Irish Rifles
- Conflicts: First World War: Battle of the Somme
- Awards: Victoria Cross; Order of St. George (Fourth Class) (Russian Empire)
- Other work: Agricultural labourer

Robert Quigg VC (28 February 1885 – 14 May 1955) was an Irish recipient of the Victoria Cross, the highest and most prestigious award for gallantry in the face of the enemy that can be awarded to British and Commonwealth forces. The award was made for his actions during the Battle of the Somme in the First World War.

== Early life ==
Robert Quigg was born on 28 February 1885 in Ardihannon, near Bushmills in County Antrim, Ireland (now Northern Ireland), one of six children of Robert Quigg and his wife Matilda née Blue. His father worked as a boatman and tour guide at the nearby Giant's Causeway. Educated at the Giant's Causeway National School, Quigg worked on the Macnaghten estate at Dunderave. He was a member of the Ulster Volunteers and commanded the Bushmills Volunteers in 1913.

== First World War ==
Shortly after the outbreak of the First World War, members of the Ulster Volunteer Force were urged to join the British Army to form an infantry division. Quigg enlisted in the Royal Irish Rifles and was posted to its 12th Battalion (Mid-Antrim Volunteers) as a private. His platoon officer was Sir Edward Harry Macnaghten, of the Macnaghten estate. The battalion formed part of the 36th (Ulster) Division, which departed for the Western Front in October 1915.

The 36th Division was stationed near Thiepval Wood from March 1916 and would be involved in the forthcoming Battle of the Somme, for which it was tasked with advancing to Grandcourt. On 1 July, the opening day of the battle, Quigg's unit advanced from the village of Hamel, located on the north bank of the River Ancre, towards the German lines. The Irish soldiers came under severe machine-gun and shell fire. Quigg's platoon had to retreat on three occasions, beaten back by German fire. The final assault in the evening of 1 July left numerous soldiers of the 12th Battalion dead or wounded in "no man's land". When he became aware the next morning that Macnaghten, his platoon commander, was missing, Quigg volunteered to go out and try to locate him. He made seven trips into "no man's land", bringing back wounded soldiers each time. However, he was unable to locate Macnaghten, whose body was never recovered. Macnaghten is commemorated on the Thiepval Memorial.

For his actions, Quigg was recommended for the Victoria Cross (VC). The VC, instituted in 1856, was the highest award for gallantry that could be bestowed on a serviceman of the armed forces of the British Empire. The citation, published in The London Gazette read:

No. 12/18645 Pte. Robert Quigg, R. Ir. Rif. For most conspicuous bravery. He advanced to the assault with his platoon three times. Early next morning, hearing a rumour that his platoon officer was lying out wounded, he went out seven times to look for him under heavy shell and machine gun fire, each time bringing back a wounded man. The last man he dragged in on a waterproof sheet from within a few yards of the enemy's wire. He was seven hours engaged in this most gallant work, and finally was so exhausted that he had to give it up.

Quigg was presented with his VC by King George V at York Cottage, in Sandringham. When he returned to Bushmills after the investiture, there was a large turnout to welcome him home. Lady Macnaghten presented Quigg with a gold watch in recognition of his bravery in attempting to find and rescue her son. Quigg, who was also awarded the Russian the Order of St. George (Fourth Class) in February 1917, returned to active duty and went on to serve in Mesopotamia and Egypt, ending the war as a sergeant.

== Later life ==
He remained in the British Army after the war but as a result of injuries from a bad fall from a window in a soldier's home in Belfast, retired from the army in 1926. He was then employed as a civilian at the Royal Ulster Rifles Depot in Armagh before, in 1934, starting work as a tour guide on the Giant's Causeway. In 1953, he met the newly crowned Queen Elizabeth II when she visited Ulster.

Quigg died on 14 May 1955 in Ballycastle. A lifelong member of the Church of Ireland, he was buried in Billy Parish Churchyard, with full military honours. He never married and was survived by his five siblings.

== Medals and legacy ==
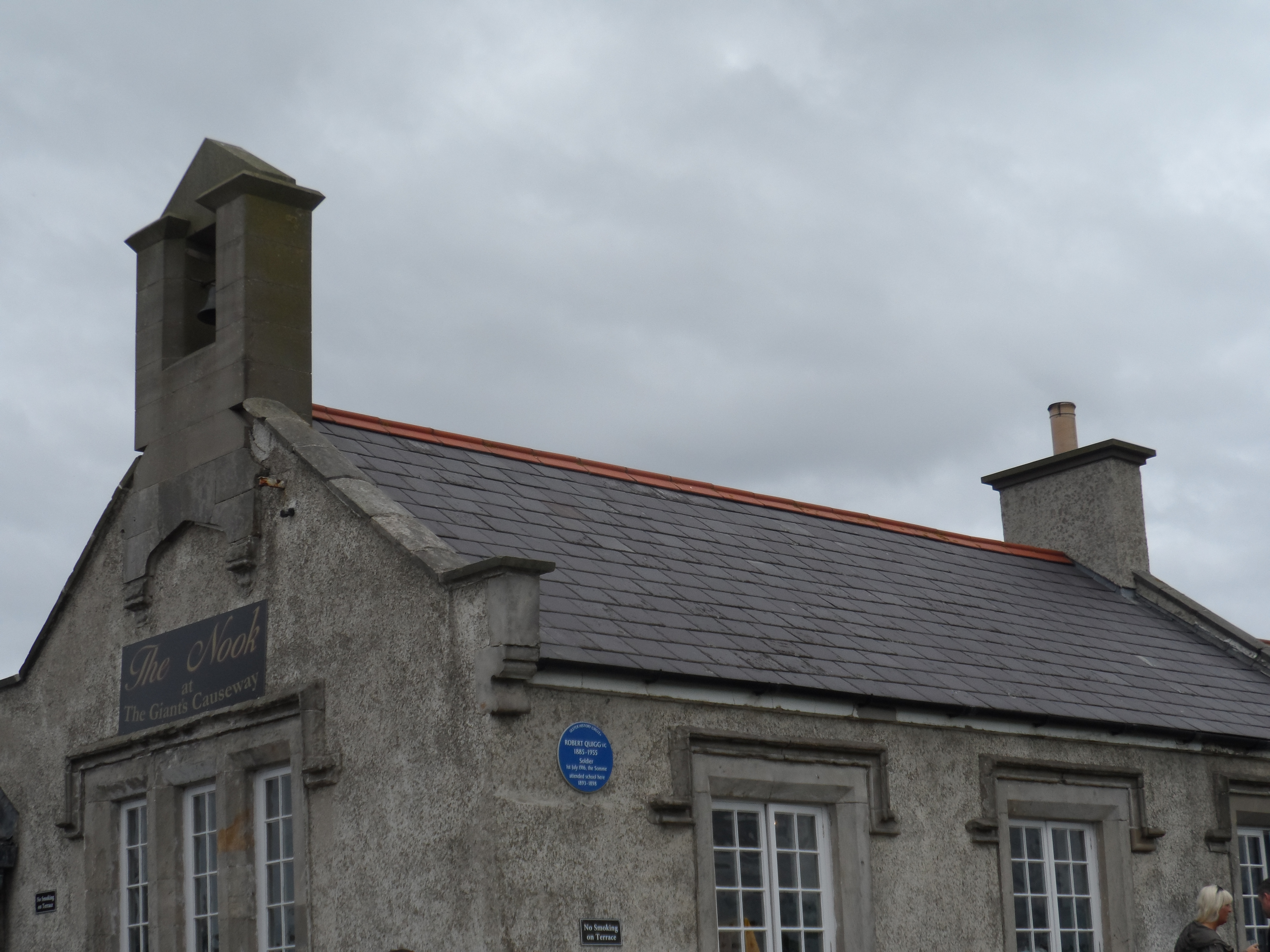
Quigg's old school (now a restaurant and pub) next to the Giant's Causeway; it bears a blue plaque with his name.

Quigg's medals which, along with the VC and Order of St. George, also included the 1914–15 Star, the British War Medal, Victory Medal, General Service Medal, King George V Silver Jubilee Medal, George VI Coronation Medal and Queen Elizabeth II Coronation Medal are on display at the Royal Ulster Rifles Museum in the Cathedral Quarter, Belfast.

There are several memorials to him; his name is one of those listed on the memorial stone at the Thiepval Memorial for the VC recipients of the Ulster Division and he is also listed on the memorial tablet for the Royal Irish Rifles at St. Anne's Cathedral at Belfast. A stone tablet dedicated to his memory sits at the foot of the Bushmills War Memorial. In late June 2016, Queen Elizabeth II, who remembered meeting Quigg in 1953, unveiled a statue of him in Bushmills. Shortly afterwards, an Ulster History Circle blue plaque naming Quigg was applied to the school building that he attended as a boy.
