= Foncquevillers =

- Commune
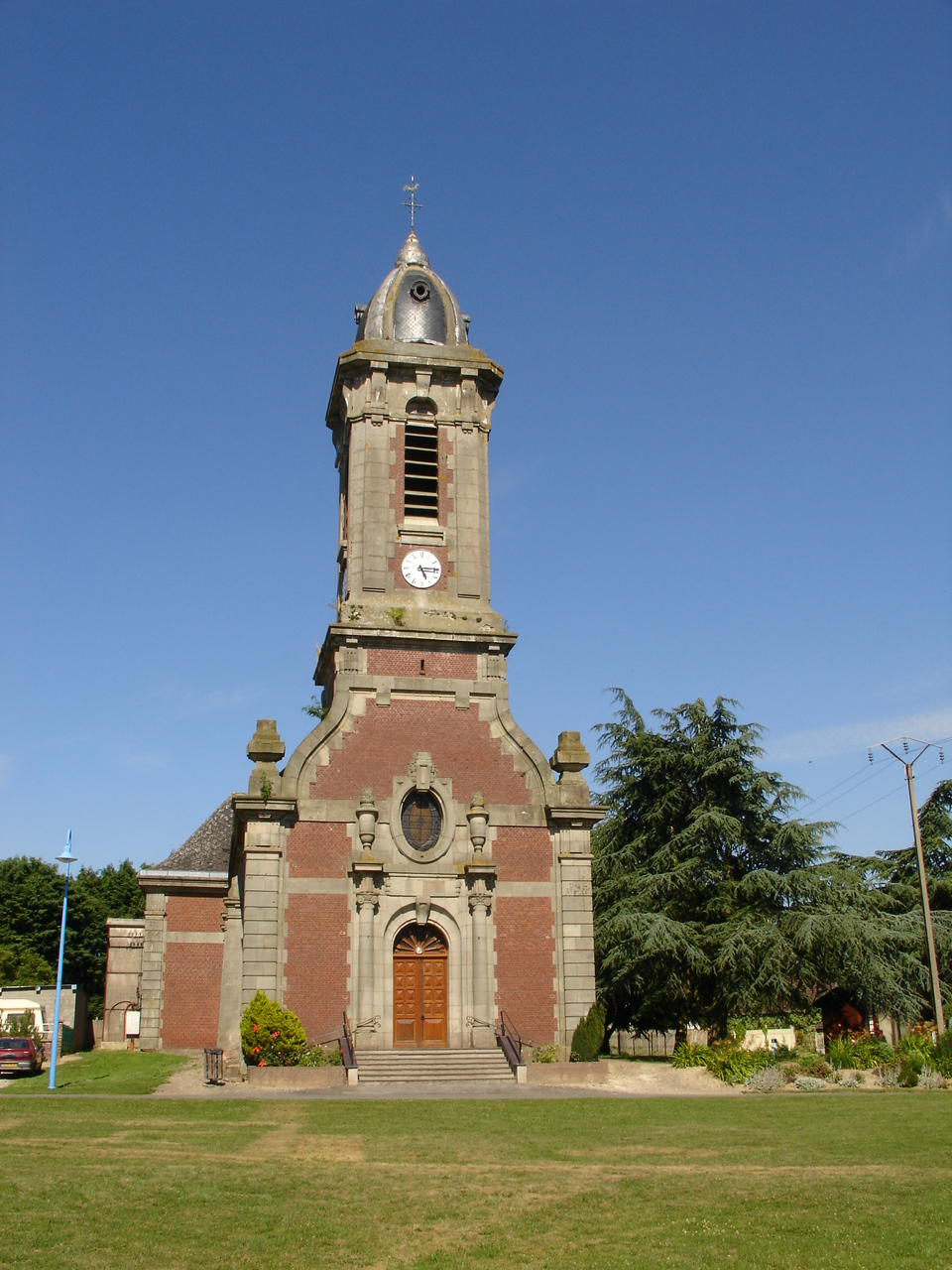
- The church of Foncquevillers

- Coat of arms
- Location of Foncquevillers
- Location within France Location within Hauts-de-France
- Coordinates: 50°08′55″N 2°37′54″E
- Country: France
- Region: Hauts-de-France
- Department: Pas-de-Calais
- Arrondissement: Arras
- Canton: Avesnes-le-Comte
- Intercommunality: CC Sud-Artois

Government
  - Mayor (2020–2026): Christophe Lagniez
- Area^{1}: 9.3 km^{2} (3.6 sq mi)
- Elevation: 150 m (490 ft)
- Highest elevation: 162 m (531 ft)
- Lowest elevation: 138 m (453 ft)
- Population (2023): 401
  - Density: 43/km^{2} (110/sq mi)
- Time zone: UTC+01:00 (CET)
  - Summer (DST): UTC+02:00 (CEST)
- INSEE/Postal code: 62341 /62111
- ^{1} French Land Register data, which excludes lakes, ponds, glaciers > 1 km^{2} (0.386 sq mi or 247 acres) and river estuaries.

Foncquevillers (French pronunciation: [fɔ̃kvile]) is a commune in the Pas-de-Calais department in the Hauts-de-France region of France.

== Geography ==
A farming village situated 12 miles (19 km) south of Arras, at the junction of the D3, D6 and the D28 roads.

== Population ==
Historical population
Year	Pop.	±% p.a.
1968	404	—
1975	388	−0.58%
1982	389	+0.04%
1990	383	−0.19%
1999	466	+2.20%
2007	473	+0.19%
2012	465	−0.34%
2017	435	−1.32%
2023	401	−1.35%
Source: INSEE

== World War I ==
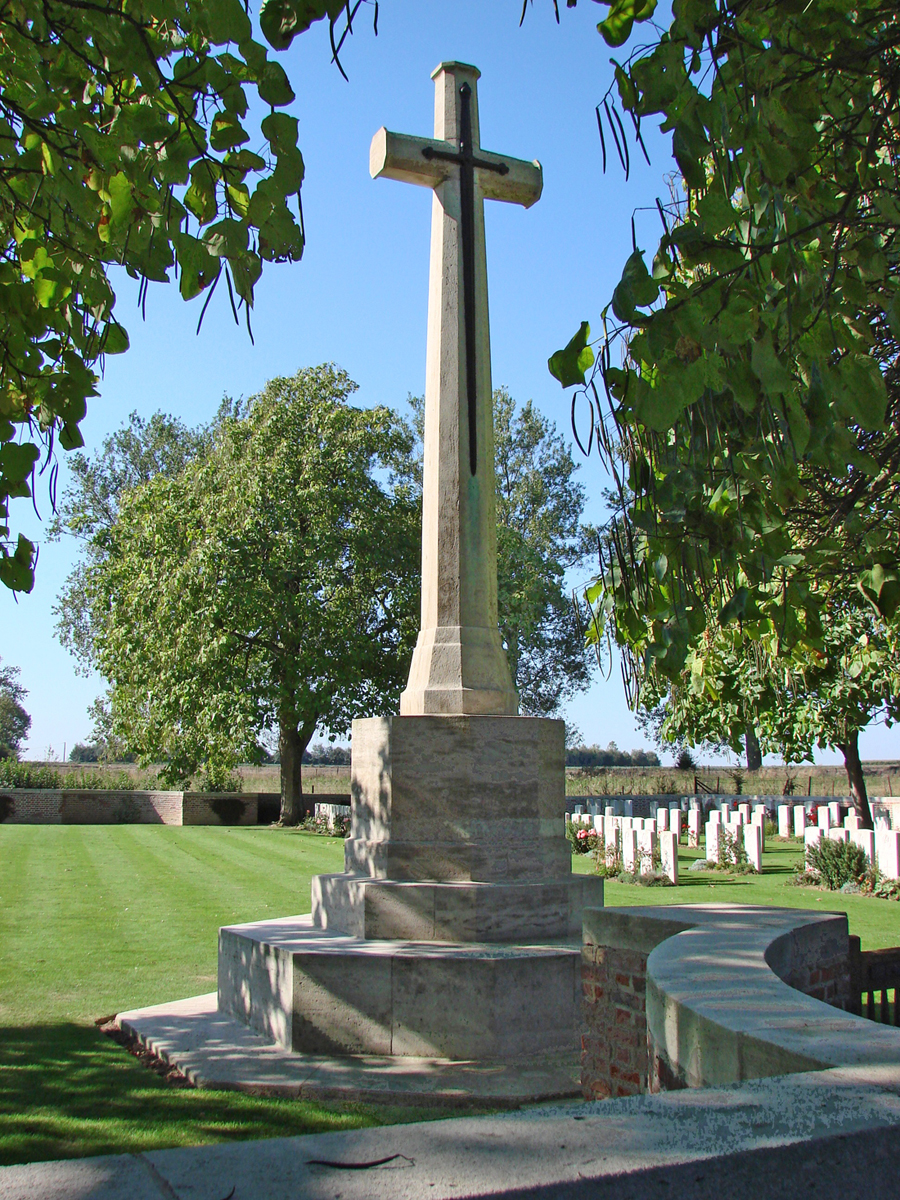
Foncquevillers Military Cemetery

Foncquevillers was on the Allied front line during almost all of the period of hostilities between 1914 and 1918 and was almost destroyed as a result. The neighbouring village of Gommecourt to the east, in German hands, was the subject of an assault starting from Foncquevillers on 1 July 1916 which formed the northernmost part of what is known in Britain as the Battle of the Somme.

British troops taking part in that attack came from the 46th (North Midland) Division, and many are buried in the Foncquevillers Military Cemetery. After the war Foncquevillers established a friendship with the English East Midlands cities of Derby and Nottingham which continues today. The Hotel de Ville in Foncquevillers has a plaque dedicated to "Derby, notre marraine" – "to Derby, our Godmother".

== Places of interest ==
- The church of Notre-Dame, rebuilt after the First World War.
- The Foncquevillers Military Cemetery, which contains 648 Commonwealth burials of the First World War. There are two graves of Chinese Labour Corps, one of a French civilian, four belong to German prisoners. The remainder are Allied servicemen's graves.
- At the side of the church is a memorial to five Canadian airmen who died when a Halifax bomber crashed near here in June 1944. Parts of the aircraft have been preserved nearby.

== See also ==
- Communes of the Pas-de-Calais department
