= Gommecourt, Pas-de-Calais =

Gommecourt
- Commune
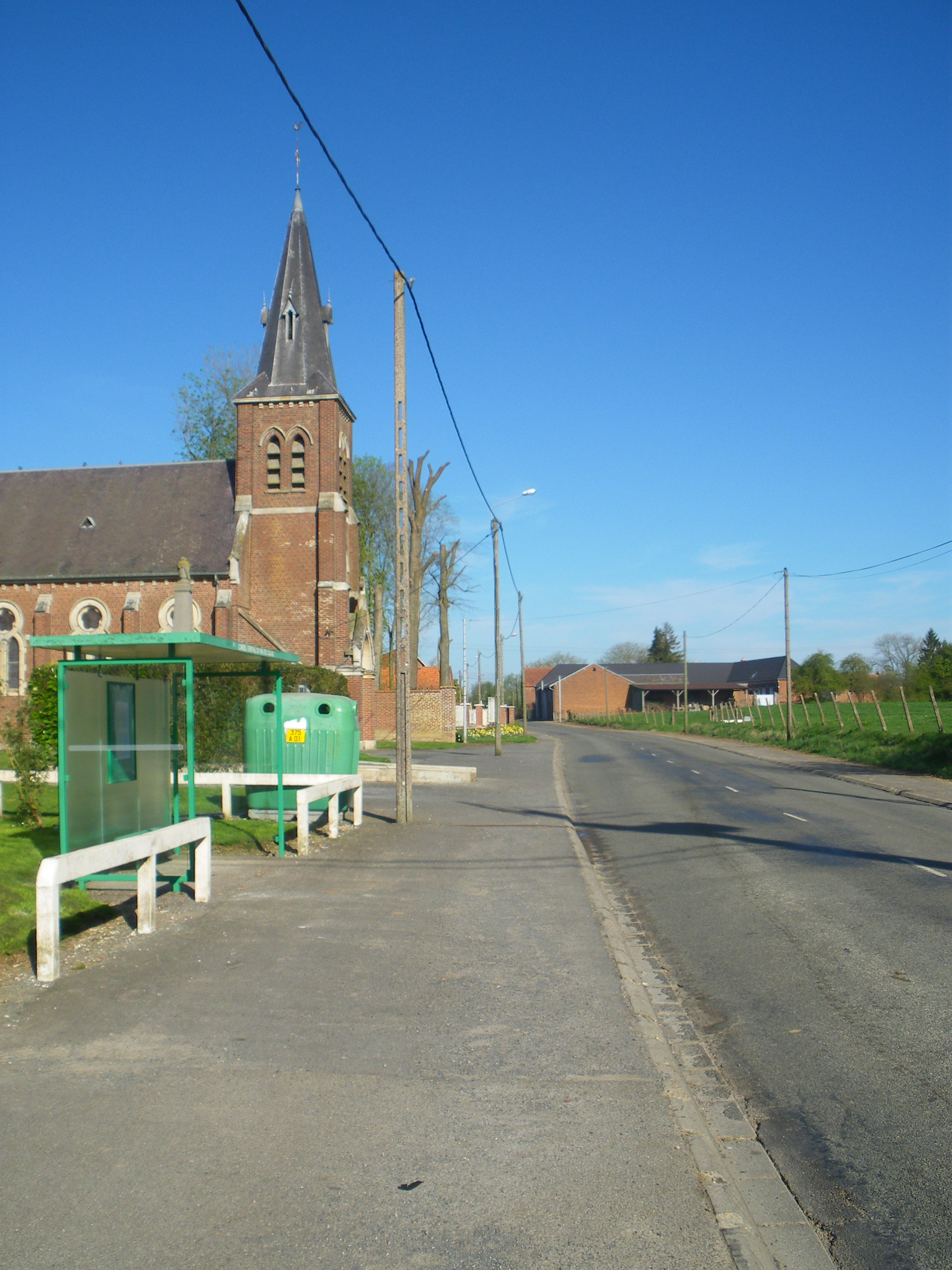
- The main road of Gommecourt

- Coat of arms
- Location of Gommecourt
- Location within France Location within Hauts-de-France
- Coordinates: 50°08′27″N 2°38′46″E
- Country: France
- Region: Hauts-de-France
- Department: Pas-de-Calais
- Arrondissement: Arras
- Canton: Avesnes-le-Comte
- Intercommunality: CC Sud-Artois

Government
  - Mayor (2020–2026): Daniel Ledru
- Area^{1}: 3.35 km^{2} (1.29 sq mi)
- Elevation: 148 m (486 ft)
- Highest elevation: 155 m (509 ft)
- Lowest elevation: 124 m (407 ft)
- Population (2023): 86
  - Density: 26/km^{2} (66/sq mi)
- Time zone: UTC+01:00 (CET)
  - Summer (DST): UTC+02:00 (CEST)
- INSEE/Postal code: 62375 /62111
- ^{1} French Land Register data, which excludes lakes, ponds, glaciers > 1 km^{2} (0.386 sq mi or 247 acres) and river estuaries.

Gommecourt (French pronunciation: [ɡɔmkuʁ]) is a commune in the Pas-de-Calais department in the Hauts-de-France region of France.

== Geography ==
A small farming village situated 14 miles (23 km) south of Arras, on the D6 road.

== History ==
Formerly within the ancient County of Artois, the village was redesignated within the new Department of the Pas de Calais after the French Revolution.

== Population ==
Historical population
Year	Pop.	±% p.a.
1968	169	—
1975	132	−3.47%
1982	132	+0.00%
1990	116	−1.60%
1999	126	+0.92%
2007	111	−1.57%
2012	109	−0.36%
2017	96	−2.51%
2023	86	−1.82%
Source: INSEE

== See also ==
- Communes of the Pas-de-Calais department
