= Archibald Stuart-Wortley (politician) =

Archibald Henry Plantagenet Stuart-Wortley (26 April 1832 – 30 April 1890), was a British Conservative Party politician.

== Background ==
Stuart-Wortley was the son of the Hon. Charles Stuart-Wortley-Mackenzie, second son of James Stuart-Wortley-Mackenzie, 1st Baron Wharncliffe. His mother was Lady Emmeline, daughter of John Manners, 5th Duke of Rutland. Victoria, Lady Welby, was his sister.

== Political career ==
Stuart-Wortley sat as Member of Parliament for Honiton alongside Joseph Locke between 1857 and 1859.

== Personal life ==
He married Lavinia Rebecca Gibbins (d. 1937) on 15 June 1879. Stuart-Wortley died in April 1890, aged 58.

Parliament of the United Kingdom
Preceded by Joseph Locke; Sir James Hogg, Bt	Member of Parliament for Honiton; 1857–1859; With: Joseph Locke	Succeeded by Joseph Locke; Alexander Baillie-Cochrane
