= Elizabeth Stuart-Wortley, Baroness Wharncliffe =

British painter

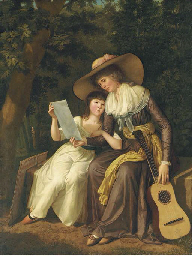
Lady Caroline Creighton with her mother, Mary, Countess Erne.

Caroline Elizabeth Mary Stuart-Wortley, Baroness Wharncliffe (née Creighton; 1779–1856), styled Lady Caroline Creighton from 1789 until her marriage, was an Irish-born British aristocrat and female artist known for her landscape and figurative drawing and painting. A number of these artworks are in the Tate collection and archives.

== Biography ==
Lady Caroline Elizabeth Mary Creighton was the daughter of the 1st Earl Erne by his second wife, the former Lady Mary Caroline Hervey, daughter of the 4th Earl of Bristol and elder sister of the notorious Lady Elizabeth Foster.

She married James Stuart-Wortley, 1st Baron Wharncliffe, and had four children;

- John Stuart-Wortley-Mackenzie, 2nd Baron Wharncliffe (1801–1855)
- Hon. Charles Stuart-Wortley-Mackenzie (1802–1844)
- Hon. James Archibald Stuart-Wortley (1805–1881), Solicitor-General
- Hon. Caroline Jane Stuart-Wortley-Mackenzie (d. 12 June 1876), married on 30 August 1830 Hon. John Chetwynd-Talbot (1806–1852)

There are four portraits of her as a child in the National Trust Collection.

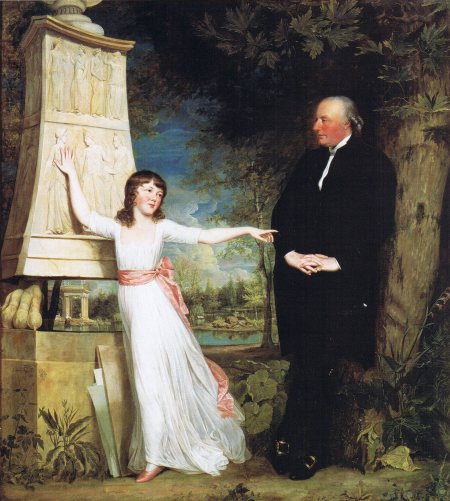
Lady Caroline Creighton with her maternal grandfather, Lord Bristol, in the gardens of the Villa Borghese in Rome.

Lord Wharncliffe died in December 1845, aged 69, and was succeeded in the barony by his eldest son, John, whose son Edward, 3rd Baron, was created Earl of Wharncliffe in 1876. Elizabeth, Dowager Baroness Wharncliffe, died in April 1856.

== Personal life ==
Lady Wharncliffe was the daughter of John Creighton, 1st Earl Erne and the granddaughter of Lord Stuart of Wortley, the first Conservative to be elected as a Member of Parliament for Sheffield. She married Lord Wharncliffe on 30 March 1799. They had four children:

- John Stuart-Wortley-Mackenzie, 2nd Baron Wharncliffe (1801–1855)
- Hon. Charles Stuart-Wortley-Mackenzie (1802–1844)
- Hon. James Archibald Stuart-Wortley (1805–1881), Solicitor-General
- Hon. Caroline Jane Stuart-Wortley-Mackenzie (d. 12 June 1876), married on 30 August 1830 Hon. John Chetwynd-Talbot (1806–1852)

== Works ==
55 works, including one landscape painting and a series of sketches of models, by Lady Wharncliffe can be found, in the Tate Collection and Archive.

== Bibliography ==
The book 'The first Lady Wharncliffe and her family (1779-1856); v.1 / by her grandchildren Caroline Grosvenor and the late Charles Beilby, Lord Stuart of Wortley. 1927' is in the Royal Collection Trust.
