= Earl of Wharncliffe =

Earldom in the Peerage of the United Kingdom

Earldom of Wharncliffe
- Blazon: Quarterly 1st & 4th, Argent, on a Bend between six Martlets Gules, three Bezants, a Canton Or, charged with a Fess chequy Azure and Argent, within a Double Tressure flory counter-flory Gules (Wortley); 2nd, Or, a Fess chequy Azure and Argent within a Double Tressure flory counter-flory Gules (Stuart); 3rd, Argent, three Lozenges conjoined in fess Gules, within a Bordure Sable (Montagu) Crests: 1st: a Demi-Lion rampant Gules, and above in an Escrol the motto NOBILIS IRA (Noble in anger) (Stuart); 2nd: an Eagle’s Leg erased Or, issuant therefrom three Ostrich Feathers proper, charged on the thigh with a Fess chequy Azure and Argent (Wortley); 3rd: a Griffin’s Head couped Or, wings endorsed and beaked Sable (Montagu); Supporters: Dexter: a Horse Argent, bridled Gules, gorged with a Collar flory counter-flory Gules. Sinister: a Stag proper, attired Or, gorged with a Collar flory counter-flory Gules.
- Creation date: 15 January 1876
- Created by: Queen Victoria
- Peerage: Peerage of the United Kingdom
- First holder: Edward Montagu-Stuart-Wortley-Mackenzie, 1st Earl of Wharncliffe
- Present holder: Richard Montagu-Stuart-Wortley-Mackenzie, 5th Earl of Wharncliffe
- Heir apparent: Reed Montagu-Stuart-Wortley-Mackenzie, Viscount Carleton
- Remainder to: Special remainder (see main text)
- Subsidiary titles: Viscount Carleton; Baron Wharncliffe
- Motto: AVITO VIRET HONORE (He flourishes with the honour of his ancestors)

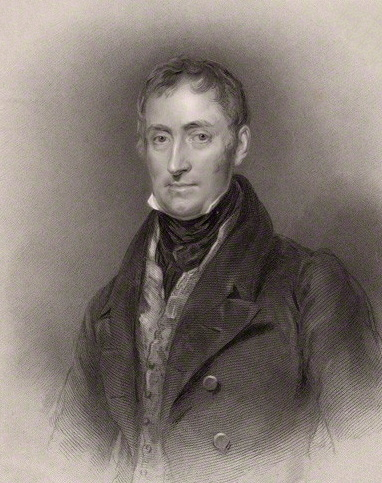
James Stuart-Wortley, 1st Baron Wharncliffe

Earl of Wharncliffe, in the West Riding of the County of York, is a title in the Peerage of the United Kingdom.

== History ==
The earldom was created in 1876 for Edward Montagu-Stuart-Wortley-Mackenzie, 3rd Baron Wharncliffe. He was a descendant of Edward Wortley Montagu (grandson of Edward Montagu, 1st Earl of Sandwich), and his wife, the author Lady Mary Wortley Montagu. Their daughter Mary married the future Prime Minister John Stuart, 3rd Earl of Bute. Their second son, James Stuart, succeeded to the Wortley estates in Yorkshire and Cornwall through his mother and assumed the additional surname of Wortley, becoming James Stuart-Wortley. In 1803, he also inherited the Scottish estates of his uncle James Stuart-Mackenzie and assumed the additional surname of Mackenzie. His second son, James Stuart-Wortley, was a soldier and prominent Tory politician. In 1826, he was raised to the Peerage of the United Kingdom as Baron Wharncliffe, of Wortley in the County of York.

The first baron was succeeded by his eldest son, John. He represented Bossiney, Perth, and the West Riding of Yorkshire in the House of Commons. On his death, the peerage passed to his eldest son, Edward, the third Baron. He was Chairman of the Manchester, Sheffield and Lincolnshire Railway, which under his leadership became the Great Central Railway. In 1876 he was created Viscount Carlton, of Carlton in the West Riding of the County of York, and Earl of Wharncliffe, in the West Riding of the County of York, with remainder to his younger brother the Hon. Francis Dudley Stuart-Wortley-Mackenzie (1829–1893). These titles are all in the Peerage of the United Kingdom. In 1880, Lord Wharncliffe assumed the additional surname of Montagu. He was succeeded in the viscountcy and earldom, by virtue of the special remainder, by his nephew Francis, the second Earl, the eldest son of the Hon. Francis Dudley Stuart-Wortley-Mackenzie. This line of the family failed on the death of his grandson, the fourth Earl, in 1987. He was succeeded by a second cousin once removed, the fifth and present Earl, Richard Alan Montagu-Stuart-Wortley, of Portland, Maine, the elder son of Alan Ralph Montagu-Stuart-Wortley, only son of Ralph Montagu-Stuart-Wortley, only son of the Hon. Ralph Granville Montagu-Stuart-Wortley, younger brother of the second Earl.

== Other notable family members ==
Several other members of this branch of the Stuart family have also gained distinction. John Stuart-Wortley, younger brother of the first Baron, sat as Member of Parliament for Bossiney. The Hon. Charles Stuart-Wortley-Mackenzie, second son of the first Baron, was also Member of Parliament for Bossiney. His daughter Victoria, Lady Welby, was a philosopher of language. Charles Stuart-Wortley, 1st Baron Stuart of Wortley, was the son of the Hon. James Stuart-Wortley, third son of the first Baron (see the Baron Stuart of Wortley for more information on this branch of the family). The Hon. Edward James Montague-Stuart-Wortley (1857–1934), second son of the Hon. Francis, second son of the second Baron, was a Major-General in the British Army. The Hon. Sir (Alan) Richard Montagu-Stuart-Wortley (1868–1949), younger son of the Hon. Francis, second son of the second Baron, was a Lieutenant-General in the British Army. The Hon. James Stuart-Wortley, third son of the second Baron, was a member of the first Parliament of New Zealand.

== Family seat ==
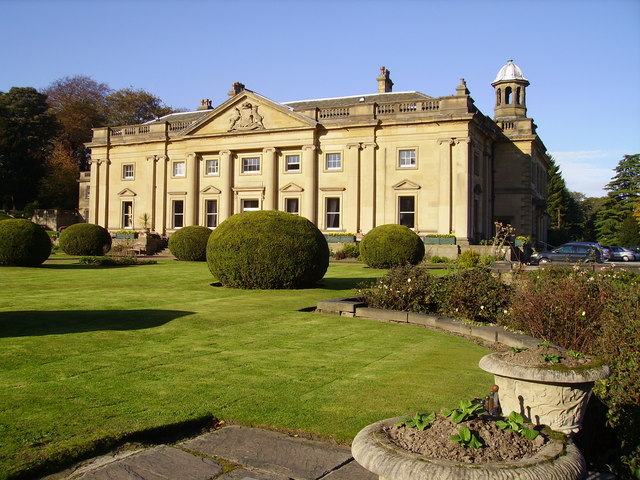
Wortley Hall, the family seat until 1950

Until the Second World War, the family seat was Wortley Hall. In 1950, it was sold by the third Earl. He kept ownership of the estate and built a new family seat, Wharncliffe House, about a mile south of Wortley, South Yorkshire, considerably smaller than the old one, with only five bedrooms, sitting in woodland on the estate. The fourth Earl continued to live there until his death.

== Barons Wharncliffe (1826) ==
- James Archibald Stuart-Wortley-Mackenzie, 1st Baron Wharncliffe (1776–1845)
- John Stuart-Wortley-Mackenzie, 2nd Baron Wharncliffe (1801–1855)
- Edward Montagu Stuart Granville Montagu-Stuart-Wortley-Mackenzie, 3rd Baron Wharncliffe (1827–1899) (created Earl of Wharncliffe in 1876)

== Earls of Wharncliffe (1876) ==
- Edward Montagu Stuart Granville Montagu-Stuart-Wortley-Mackenzie, 1st Earl of Wharncliffe (1827–1899)
- Francis John Montagu-Stuart-Wortley-Mackenzie, 2nd Earl of Wharncliffe (1856–1926)
- Archibald Ralph Montagu-Stuart-Wortley-Mackenzie, 3rd Earl of Wharncliffe (1892–1953) married on 24 March 1918 Lady Maud Lillian Elfreda Mary Wentworth-Fitzwilliam, a daughter of William Wentworth-Fitzwilliam, 7th Earl Fitzwilliam
- Alan James Montagu-Stuart-Wortley-Mackenzie, 4th Earl of Wharncliffe (1935–1987) married on 25 July 1957 Aline Margaret Bruce
- Richard Alan Montagu Stuart Wortley, 5th Earl of Wharncliffe (born 1953)

== Present peer ==
Richard Alan Montagu Stuart Wortley, 5th Earl of Wharncliffe (born 1953), is an American second cousin once removed of the fourth Earl, a grandson of Ralph Granville Montagu-Stuart-Wortley (1864–1927), a younger brother of the second earl, and succeeded to the peerages in 1987. At the time, he was a construction foreman from Cumberland, Maine. The fourth Earl separated the peerages from what was left of the estate, leaving it to his immediate family. In July 1987, the new peer arrived in Yorkshire as a tourist, to visit the family seat, which he had never seen. He commented “I am just an ordinary guy.” The estate was ultimately inherited by Lady Rowena Wortley-Hunt, only surviving child of the fourth earl, who took it over on her mother’s death in 2001.

The heir apparent to the peerages is the present holder's eldest son, Reed Montagu Stuart Wortley, Viscount Carlton (born 1980).

== Line of succession ==
Line of succession
- John Stuart-Wortley-Mackenzie, 2nd Baron Wharncliffe (1801–1855)
  - Edward Montagu-Stuart-Wortley-Mackenzie, 1st Earl of Wharncliffe (1827–1899)
  - Francis Dudley Montagu-Stuart-Wortley (1829–1893)
    - Francis Montagu-Stuart-Wortley-Mackenzie, 2nd Earl of Wharncliffe (1856–1926)
      - Archibald Montagu-Stuart-Wortley-Mackenzie, 3rd Earl of Wharncliffe (1892–1953)
        - Alan Montagu-Stuart-Wortley-Mackenzie, 4th Earl of Wharncliffe (1935–1987)
    - Ralph Granville Montagu-Stuart-Wortley (1864–1927)
      - Ralph Montagu-Stuart-Wortley (1897–1961)
        - Alan Ralph Montagu-Stuart-Wortley (1927–1986)
          - Richard Montagu-Stuart-Wortley, 5th Earl of Wharncliffe (b. 1953)
            - (1). Reed Montagu-Stuart-Wortley, Viscount Carlton (b. 1980)
              - (2). Evan Caid Montagu-Stuart-Wortley (b. 2002)
              - (3). Quinlan James Montagu-Stuart-Wortley (b. 2008)
            - (4). Christopher James Montagu-Stuart-Wortley (b. 1983)
              - (5). Oliver Charles Montagu-Stuart-Wortley (b. 2014)
              - (6). Asher Reed Montagu-Stuart-Wortley (b. 2017)
            - (7). Otis Alexander Montagu-Stuart-Wortley (b. 1991)
          - (8). William Ralph Montagu-Stuart-Wortley (b. 1959)
            - (9). Brian Alan Montagu-Stuart-Wortley (b. 1987)
            - (10). Michael Riley Montagu-Stuart-Wortley (b. 1993)

== See also ==
- Marquess of Bute
- Baron Stuart of Wortley
- Baron Stuart de Rothesay
- Baron Stuart de Decies
- Wortley Hall
- Earl of Sandwich
