= John Stuart-Wortley, 2nd Baron Wharncliffe =

British Tory politician

The Right Honourable The Lord Wharncliffe FRS
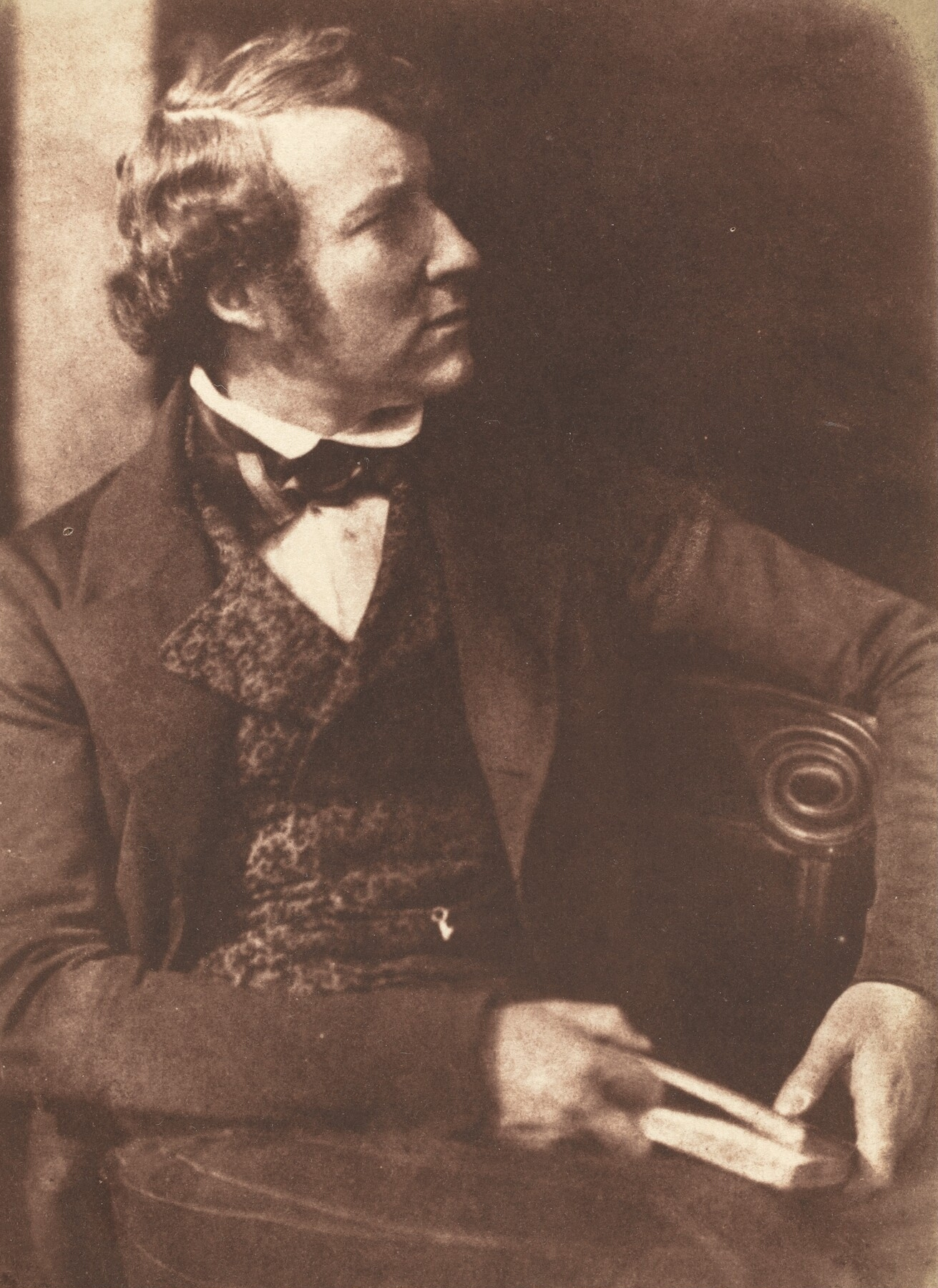
- Circa 1840s, by Hill & Adamson

Under-Secretary of State for War and the Colonies
- In office 20 December 1834 – 27 January 1835
- Monarch: William IV
- Prime Minister: Sir Robert Peel, Bt
- Preceded by: Sir George Grey, Bt
- Succeeded by: William Ewart Gladstone

Personal details
- Born: 20 April 1801
- Died: 22 October 1855 (aged 54)
- Party: Tory
- Spouse: Lady Georgiana Elizabeth Ryder (d. 1884)
- Children: 5, including Edward and James
- Parent(s): James Stuart-Wortley, 1st Baron Wharncliffe; Lady Elizabeth Crichton

John Stuart-Wortley, 2nd Baron Wharncliffe FRS (20 April 1801 – 22 October 1855), was a British Tory politician. He served briefly as Under-Secretary of State for War and the Colonies between December 1834 and January 1835.

== Background ==
A member of the Stuart family headed by the Marquess of Bute, Wharncliffe was the son of James Stuart-Wortley, 1st Baron Wharncliffe, and his wife Lady Caroline Elizabeth Mary Crichton, daughter of John Crichton, 1st Earl Erne. He was the elder brother of Charles Stuart-Wortley and James Stuart-Wortley.

== Political career ==
Wharncliffe sat as Member of Parliament for Bossiney from 1823 to 1830, for Perth Burghs from 1830 to 1831 and for the West Riding of Yorkshire from 1841 to 1845. He served under the Duke of Wellington as Secretary to the Board of Control in 1830 and under Sir Robert Peel as Under-Secretary of State for War and the Colonies from 1834 to 1835. In 1845 succeeded his father in the barony and took his seat in the House of Lords.

Lord Wharncliffe was elected a Fellow of the Royal Society on 4 June 1829.

== Family ==
Lord Wharncliffe married Lady Georgiana Elizabeth Ryder, daughter of Dudley Ryder, 1st Earl of Harrowby, in 1825. They had five children:

- Hon. Mary Caroline Stuart-Wortley (17 October 1826 – 2 April 1896), married Henry Moore, 3rd Marquess of Drogheda on 27 August 1847, without issue.
- Edward Montagu-Stuart-Wortley-Mackenzie, 1st Earl of Wharncliffe (1827–1899).
- Hon. Francis Dudley Stuart-Wortley-Mackenzie (23 July 1829 – 21 October 1893), married Maria Elizabeth Martin on 28 August 1855 and had issue, including the 2nd Earl of Wharncliffe, who himself was the father of the 3rd Earl.
- Hon. James Stuart-Wortley (1833–1870).
- Hon. Cecily Susan Stuart-Wortley-Mackenzie (1835 – 2 May 1915), married Henry Montagu-Scott, 1st Baron Montagu of Beaulieu on 4 August 1865 and had issue.

Lord Wharncliffe died on 22 October 1855, aged 54, at Wortley Hall, Wortley, and was succeeded in the barony by his eldest son Edward, who was created Earl of Wharncliffe in 1876. Lady Wharncliffe survived her husband by almost 30 years and died in August 1884.

=== Ancestry ===
Ancestors of John Stuart-Wortley, 2nd Baron Wharncliffe

16. James Stuart, 2nd Earl of Bute
8. John Stuart, 3rd Earl of Bute
17. Lady Anne Campbell
4. James Stuart-Wortley-Mackenzie
18. Sir Edward Wortley Montagu
9. Mary Wortley Montagu
19. Lady Mary Pierrepont
2. James Stuart-Wortley, 1st Baron Wharncliffe
20. Sir David Cunynghame, 1st Baronet
10. Sir David Cunynghame, 3rd Baronet
21. Hon. Elizabeth Baird
5. Hon. Margaret Cunynghame
22. Alexander Montgomerie, 9th Earl of Eglinton
11. Lady Mary Montgomerie
23. Lady Anne Gordon
1. John Stuart-Wortley, 2nd Baron Wharncliffe
24. David Creighton
12. Abraham Creighton, 1st Baron Erne
25. Catherine Southwell
6. John Creighton, 1st Earl Erne
26. Hon. John Rogerson
13. Elizabeth Rogerson
27. Elizabeth Ludlow
3. Lady Elizabeth Crichton
28. John Hervey, 2nd Baron Hervey
14. Frederick Hervey, 4th Earl of Bristol
29. Mary Lepell
7. Lady Mary Hervey
30. Sir Jermyn Davers, 4th Baronet
15. Hon. Elizabeth Davers
31. Margaretta Green

== Works ==
- Abolition of the Vice-Royalty of Ireland (1850)

Parliament of the United Kingdom
Preceded by Sir Compton Domvile; John Ward	Member of Parliament for Bossiney; 1823–1830; With: Sir Compton Domvile 1823–1826; Edward Rose Tunno 1826–1830	Succeeded by Edward Rose Tunno; Charles James Stuart-Wortley
Preceded by Hugh Lindsay	Member of Parliament for Perth Burghs; 1830–1831	Succeeded by Francis Jeffrey
Preceded by Edward Rose Tunno; Charles James Stuart-Wortley	Member of Parliament for Bossiney; 1831–1832; With: Edward Rose Tunno	Constituency abolished
Preceded by Viscount Morpeth; Sir George Strickland	Member of Parliament for the West Riding of Yorkshire; 1841–1845; With: Edmund Beckett Denison	Succeeded by Edmund Beckett Denison; Viscount Morpeth
Political offices
Preceded by George Bankes	Secretary to the Board of Control; 1830	Succeeded by Viscount Sandon
Preceded by Sir George Grey	Under-Secretary of State for War and the Colonies; 1834–1835	Succeeded by William Ewart Gladstone
Peerage of the United Kingdom
Preceded by James Archibald Stuart-Wortley	Baron Wharncliffe; 1845–1855	Succeeded by Edward Montagu-Stuart-Wortley-Mackenzie
