= Alan Montagu-Stuart-Wortley-Mackenzie, 4th Earl of Wharncliffe =

British landowner and hereditary peer

Alan Montagu-Stuart-Wortley-Mackenzie, 4th Earl of Wharncliffe (23 March 1935 – 3 June 1987), known as Viscount Carlton from birth until 1953, was a British landowner and hereditary peer who was a member of the House of Lords from 1956 until his death.

== Early life and education ==
Wharncliffe was the only son of Archibald Montagu-Stuart-Wortley-Mackenzie, 3rd Earl of Wharncliffe and his wife Lady Elfrida Wentworth Fitzwilliam, daughter of William Wentworth-Fitzwilliam, 7th Earl Fitzwilliam. He was educated at Eton. He had four older sisters, one of whom married Henry Pelham-Clinton-Hope, 9th Duke of Newcastle.

== Career ==
In 1953, as Lord Carlton joined the Royal Navy as an able seaman, serving until later in that year when he succeeded his father in the earldom and viscountcy.

He was subsequently a drummer in a rock band, a motor mechanic, a publican and a salesman.

Although his father had sold Wortley Hall, Wharncliffe inherited the Wharncliffe estate.

== Personal life ==
Wharncliffe was banned from the roads for three years after being caught drink-driving in 1976.

He was jailed for six months in 1980 for causing death by reckless driving, 15 days after getting his licence back in April 1979.

43-year-old mother-of-three June Deakin was killed when Wharncliffe crashed into her car after drinking double brandies.

Mrs Deakin's husband Terry was driving the car and suffered serious injuries.

== Marriage and children ==
On 25 July 1957, Wharncliffe married Aline Margaret Bruce, a daughter of Robert Fernie Dunlop Bruce. They had two daughters:

- Lady Joanna Margaret Montagu-Stuart-Wortley-Mackenzie (15 July 1959 – 8 March 1981), who was killed in a road accident at the age of 21; she was killed at Caenby Corner in Lincolnshire on a Sunday afternoon; she had attended the local Riseholme College. The Volkswagen Golf GTI had left the road, with her boyfriend from Blyborough.
- Lady Rowena Montagu-Stuart-Wortley-Mackenzie (born 14 June 1961), who in 1986 married John Hunt, son of Dr G H Hunt. They took the name of Wortley-Hunt and have two children, Somerset Carlton Gerald Wortley-Hunt (born 1987) and Fleur Aline Isabel Montagu Stuart Wortley-Hunt (born 1989), but later divorced.

== Death ==
Lord Wharncliffe died on 3 June 1987 at Wharncliffe House, Wortley, South Yorkshire, and was buried at St Leonard's Church, Wortley. He was succeeded in the earldom and viscountcy by an American cousin Richard Montagu Stuart Wortley, 5th Earl of Wharncliffe, a grandson of Ralph Granville Montagu-Stuart-Wortley (1864–1927), a younger brother of the second earl. However, he separated the peerages from the estate, leaving that to his immediate family. The estate was ultimately inherited by Lady Rowena Wortley-Hunt, who took it over on her mother’s death in 2001.

In July 1987, the 5th Earl, a construction foreman from Cumberland, Maine, arrived in Yorkshire as a tourist to visit the family seat which he had never seen. He commented “I am just an ordinary guy.”

== Notes ==
Peerage of the United Kingdom
Preceded by Alan Montagu-Stuart-Wortley-Mackenzie	Earl of Wharncliffe; 1953–1987	Succeeded by Richard Montagu Stuart Wortley
