= Significs =

Linguistic and philosophical term

Significs (Dutch: significa) is a linguistic and philosophical term introduced by Victoria, Lady Welby in the 1890s. It was later adopted by the Dutch Significs Group (or movement) of thinkers around Frederik van Eeden, which included L. E. J. Brouwer, founder of intuitionistic logic, and further developed by Gerrit Mannoury and others.

== Overview ==
Significs, intended to be a theory of signs, was developed by Lady Welby in quite close connection with the work of Charles Sanders Peirce, her correspondent. There is no scholarly consensus on its precise placing as an influence on later developments: on the ground now occupied by semantics, semiotics and semiology, it is closer to semiology than to the two others. While significs is a possible precursor of later semiology, the extent of the connection between the two remains a matter of debate.

At a personal level Lady Welby did have some effect, particularly on C. K. Ogden. A mediating figure, she has not until quite recently been given great attention.

== Significs topics ==
The following sections are taken directly from the 1911 Encyclopædia Britannica article written by Lady Welby.

=== Definition ===
The term "Significs" may be defined as the science of meaning or the study of significance, provided sufficient recognition is given to its practical aspect as a method of mind, one which is involved in all forms of mental activity, including that of logic. In Baldwin's Dictionary of Philosophy and Psychology (1901–1905) the following definition is given:

1. Significs implies a careful distinction between

(a) sense or signification,
(b) meaning or intention and
(c) significance or ideal worth.

It will be seen that the reference of the first is mainly verbal (or rather sensual), of the second volitional, and of the third moral (e.g. we speak of some event ' the significance of which cannot be overrated, and it would be impossible in such a case to substitute the ' sense ' or the ' meaning ' of such event, without serious loss). Significs treats of the relation of the sign in the widest sense to each of these.

2. A proposed method of mental training aiming at the concentration of intellectual activities on that which is implicitly assumed to constitute the primary and ultimate value of every form of study, i.e. what is at present indifferently called its meaning or sense, its import or significance.... Significs as a science would centralise and co-ordinate, interpret, inter-relate and concentrate the efforts to bring out meanings in every form, and in so doing to classify the various applications of the signifying property clearly and distinctly." Since this dictionary was published, however, the subject has undergone further consideration and some development, which necessitate modifications in the definition given. It is clear that stress needs to be laid upon the application of the principles and method involved, not merely, though notably, to language, but to all other types of human function. There is need to insist on the rectification of mental attitude and increase of interpretative power which must follow on the adoption of the significal view-point and method, throughout all stages and forms of mental training, and in the demands and contingencies of life.

=== Scope ===
In so far as it deals with linguistic forms, Significs includes "Semantics," a branch of study which was formally introduced and expounded in 1897 by Michel Breal, the distinguished French philologist, in his Essai de semantique. In 1900 this book was translated into English by Emmeline Cust, the daughter of Lady Welby, with a preface by Professor Postgate. M. Breal gives no more precise definition than the following: "Extraire de la linguistique ce qui en ressort comme aliment pour la réflexion et - je ne crains pas de l'ajouter - comme règle pour notre propre langage, puisque chacun de nous collabore pour sa part a l'évolution de la parole humaine, voila ce qui mérite d'être mis en lumière, voila ce qui j'ai essayé de faire en ce volume." In the Dictionary of Philosophy and Psychology Semantics is defined as "the doctrine of historical word-meanings; the systematic discussion of the history and development of changes in the meanings of words." It may thus be regarded as a reform and extension of the etymological method, which applies to contemporary as well as to traditional or historical derivation. As human interests grow in constantly specialized directions, the vocabulary thus enriched is unthinkingly borrowed and reborrowed on many sides, at first in definite quotation, but soon in unconscious or deliberate adoption. Semantics may thus, for present purposes, be described as the application of Significs within strictly philological limits; but it does not include the study and classification of the "Meaning" terms themselves, nor the attainment of a clear recognition of their radical importance as rendering, well or ill, the expressive value not only of sound and script but also of all fact or occurrence which demands and may arouse profitable attention.

=== Objectives ===
The first duty of the Significian is, therefore, to deprecate the demand for mere linguistic reform, which is indispensable on its own proper ground, but cannot be considered as the satisfaction of a radical need such as that now suggested. To be content with mere reform of articulate expression would be fatal to the prospect of a significantly adequate language; one characterized by a development only to be compared to that of the life and mind of which it is or should be naturally the delicate, flexible, fitting, creative, as also controlling and ordering, Expression.

The classified use of the terms of expression-value suggests three main levels or classes of that value - those of Sense, Meaning and Significance.

(a) The first of these at the outset would naturally be associated with Sense in its most primitive reference; that is, with the organic response to environment, and with the essentially expressive element in all experience. We ostracize the senseless in speech, and also ask "in what sense" a word is used or a statement may be justified.

(b) But "Sense" is not in itself purposive; whereas that is the main character of the word "Meaning," which is properly reserved for the specific sense which it is intended to convey.

(c) As including sense and meaning but transcending them in range, and covering the far-reaching consequence, implication, ultimate result or outcome of some event or experience, the term "Significance" is usefully applied.

These are not, of course, the only significal terms in common use, though perhaps sense and significance are on the whole the most consistently employed. We have also signification, purport, import, bearing, reference, indication, application, implication, denotation and connotation, the weight, the drift, the tenour, the lie, the trend, the range, the tendency, of given statements. We say that this fact suggests, that one portends, another carries, involves or entails certain consequences, or justifies given inferences. And finally we have the value of all forms of expression; that which makes worthwhile any assertion or proposition, concept, doctrine or theory; the definition of scientific fact, the use of symbolic method, the construction of mathematical formulae, the playing of an actor's part, or even art itself, like literature in all its forms.

The distinctive instead of haphazard use, then, of these and like terms would soon, both as clearing and enriching it, tell for good on our thinking. If we considered that any one of them were senseless, unmeaning, insignificant, we should at once in ordinary usage and in education disavow and disallow it. As it is, accepted idiom may unconsciously either illuminate or contradict experience. We speak, for instance, of going through trouble or trial; we never speak of going through well-being. That illuminates. But also we speak of the Inner or Internal as alternative to the spatial - reducing the spatial to the External. The very note of the value to the philosopher of the "Inner" as opposed to the "Outer" experience is that a certain example or analogue of enclosed space - a specified inside - is thus not measurable. That obscures. Such a usage, in fact, implies that, within enclosing limits, space sometimes ceases to exist. Comment is surely needless.

=== Education ===
The most urgent reference and the most promising field for Significs lie in the direction of education. The normal child, with his inborn exploring, significating and comparing tendencies is so far the natural Significian. At once to enrich and simplify language would for him be a fascinating endeavour. Even his crudeness would often be suggestive. It is for his elders to supply the lacking criticism out of the storehouse of racial experience, acquired knowledge and ordered economy of means; and to educate him also by showing the dangers and drawbacks of uncontrolled linguistic, as other, adventure. Now the evidence that this last has virtually been hitherto left undone and even reversed, is found on careful examination to be overwhelming.' Unhappily what we have so far called education has, anyhow for centuries past, ignored - indeed in most cases even balked - the instinct to scrutinise and appraise the value of all that exists or happens within our ken, actual or possible, and fittingly to express this.

== Significs movement ==
The Dutch significs thinkers, besides van Eeden and Brouwer, included David van Dantzig, Herman Gorter, Jacob Israël de Haan, Henri Borel, Gerrit Mannoury and Evert W. Beth, a group with varied professional affiliations.

The Signifische Kring was founded in 1922 by Brouwer, Mannoury, van Eeden and Jacques van Ginneken. Its later Dutch institutional history included the advent of biologists Hermann Jacques Jordan and Christiaan Pieter Raven. Internationally there were set up the International Group for the Study of Significs, followed by the International Society for Significs.
