= John Platt (sculptor) =

English sculptor and architect

John Platt (9 March 1728 – 1810) was an 18th-century English sculptor and architect.

== Life ==
He was born at Thrybergh near Rotherham on 9 March 1728 the son of George Platt (1700–1743) and nephew of a local architect. In the late 18th century he took over the stone-yard and marble-works of Henry Watson in Ashford, Derbyshire.

He died in Halifax and was buried in Rotherham parish churchyard. The stone was removed in 1950.

== Works ==
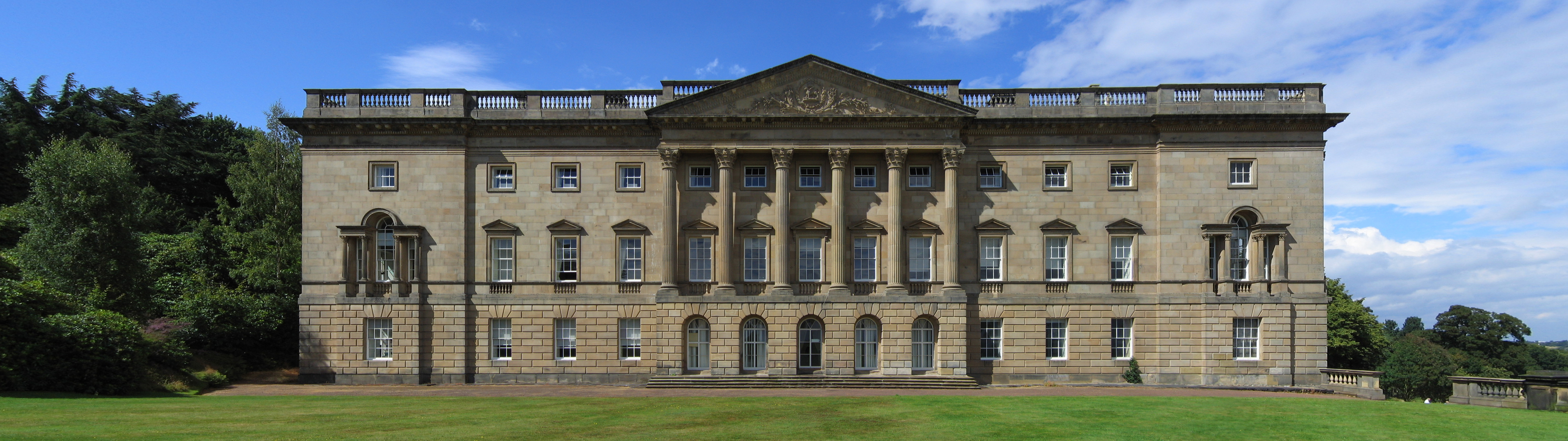
Grand portico at Wentworth Castle

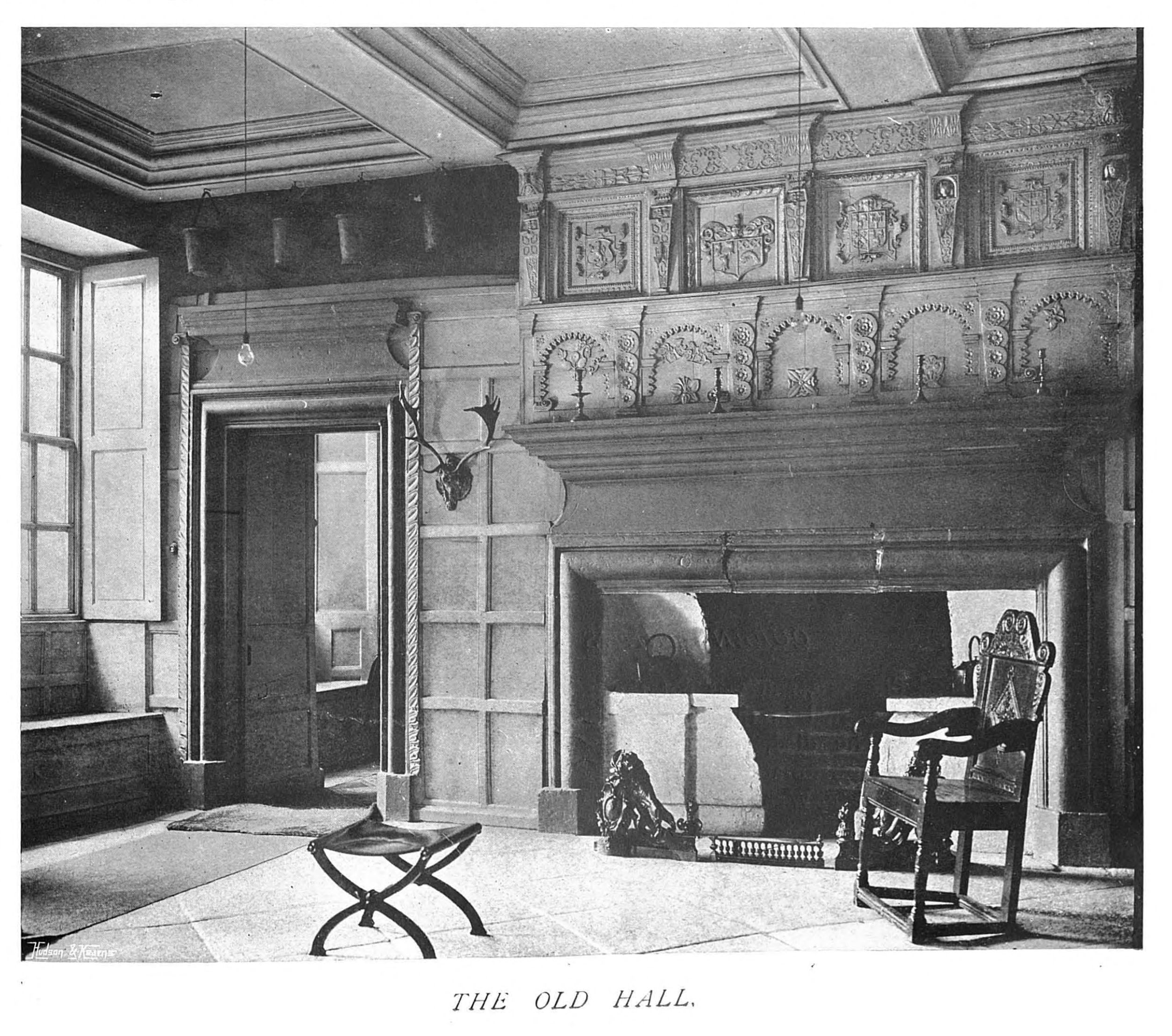
Fireplace in Wentworth Castle

- Monument to the Hopkins family at Gainsborough, Lincolnshire (1748)
- East wing of Wortley Hall (1757–1761)
- Grand portico at Wentworth Castle (1762)
- Fireplaces at Wentworth Castle (c.1764)
- Monument to Mrs Bamford in Sheffield church (1767)
- Bridge in Rotherham (c.1767–69)
- Refronting of Moorgate Hall in Rotherham (1768)
- Monument to Mr Copley at Sprotboro (1769)
- Monument to Mr Wolrich at Leeds (1769)
- Tower and interior of St Paul's Church in Sheffield (1769)
- Ferham House in Masbrough for Jonathan Walker (1775–1780)
- Marble staircase at Aston Hall in Yorkshire (1776)
- Rotherham Charity School (1776)
- Monument to Lady Bute at Wortley Chapel (1778)
- Monument to Mrs Catherine Buck in Rotherham parish church (1778)
- Monument to Mr Birk in Sheffield (1783)
- Monument to Miss Freeman in Ecclesfield Church (1783)
- Monument to Lt Col Downes in Rotherham parish church (1785) in blue john
- Large monument to Mr Foljambe of Aldwark !790)
- Monument to Ref Francis Hall in Tankersley Church (1793)
- Townhouse in Rotherham (1794) later converted into Town Chambers
- Monument to Robert Cutforthay in Rotherham parish church (1799)
- Marble staircase at Clifton Hall near Rotherham (1882)

== Family ==
He was married and had at least four sons all of whom were pushed towards sculpture. The eldest was John (1763–1832) studied both sculpture and architecture but ended in the Royal Navy. Charles Platt (1770–1817) was apprenticed to Richard Westmacott the Elder. George Platt (1779–1850) studied architecture under Rawdon of York and later joined the British Army. William (1775–1811) was apprenticed to P W Tomkins, engraver to the King and later had a business in Golden Square.
