= Evert Willem Beth =

Dutch philosopher and logician (1908–1964)

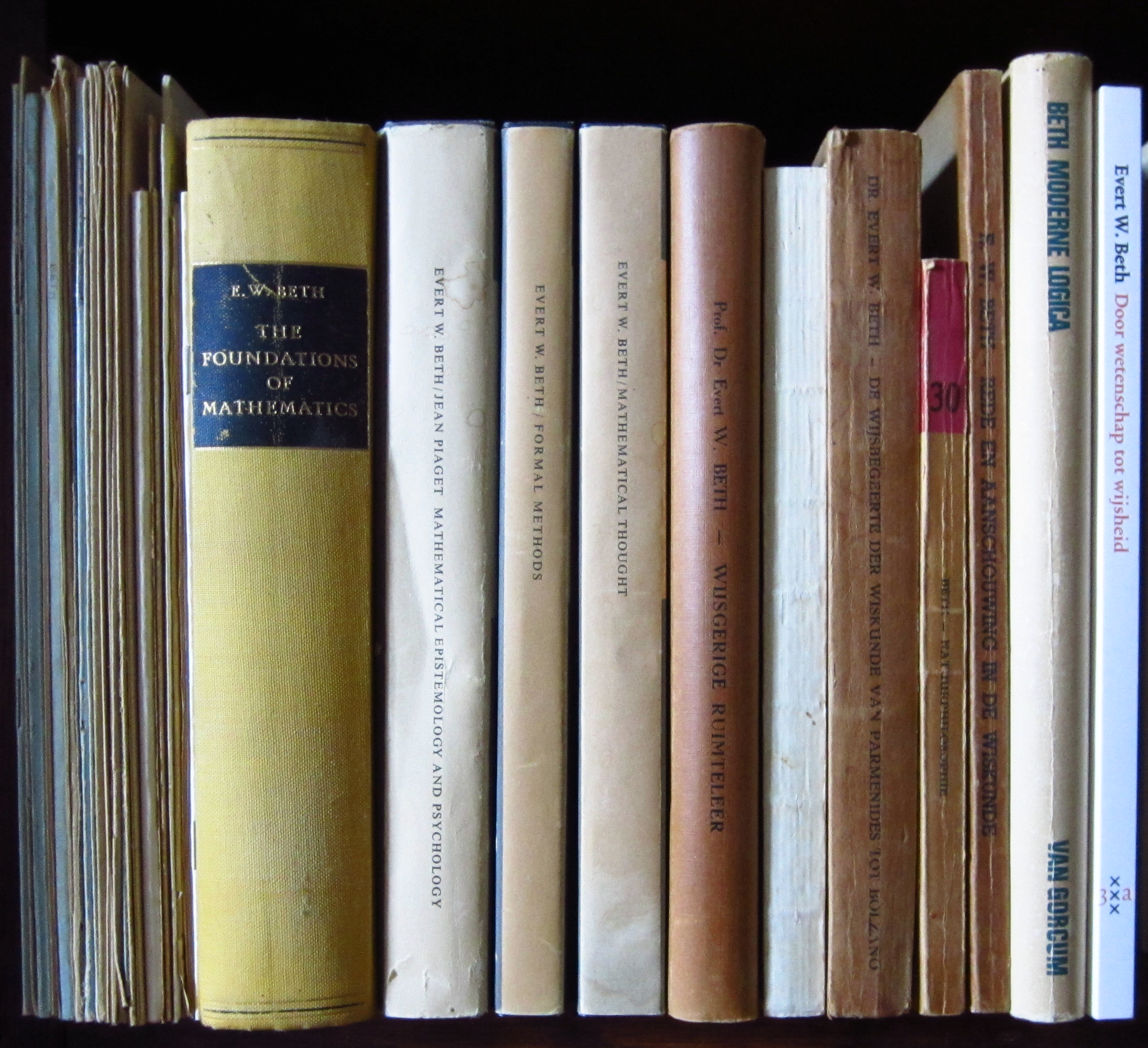
Part of Beth's publications

Evert Willem Beth (7 July 1908 – 12 April 1964) was a Dutch philosopher and logician, whose work principally concerned the foundations of mathematics. He was a member of the Significs Group.

== Biography ==
Beth was born in Almelo, a small town in the eastern Netherlands. His father had studied mathematics and physics at the University of Amsterdam, where he had been awarded a PhD. Evert Beth studied the same subjects at Utrecht University, but then also studied philosophy and psychology. His 1935 PhD was in philosophy.

In 1946, he became professor of logic and the foundations of mathematics in Amsterdam. Apart from two brief interruptions – a stint in 1951 as a research assistant to Alfred Tarski, and in 1957 as a visiting professor at Johns Hopkins University – he held the post in Amsterdam continuously until his death in 1964. His was the first academic post in his country in logic and the foundations of mathematics, and during this time he contributed actively to international cooperation in establishing logic as an academic discipline.

In 1953 he became member of the Royal Netherlands Academy of Arts and Sciences.

He died in Amsterdam.

== Contributions to logic ==
=== Beth definability theorem ===
The Beth definability theorem is a fundamental result in logic that states a property implicitly defined by a first-order theory has an explicit definition within that theory.This means that if a new symbol or property is uniquely determined across all models of a theory, there must be a formula using only the existing symbols of the theory that defines it. The theorem establishes an equivalence between implicit and explicit definability in classical first-order logic, linking its syntax (proofs) and semantics (models).

=== Semantic tableaux ===
Beth's most famous contribution to formal logic is semantic tableaux, which are decision procedures for propositional logic and first-order logic. It is a semantic method—like Wittgenstein's truth tables or J. Alan Robinson's resolution—as opposed to the proof of theorems in a formal system, such as the axiomatic systems employed by Frege, Russell and Whitehead, and Hilbert, or even Gentzen's natural deduction. Semantic tableaux are an effective decision procedure for propositional logic, whereas they are only semi-effective for first-order logic, since first-order logic is undecidable, as showed by Church's theorem. This method is considered by many to be intuitively simple, particularly for students who are not acquainted with the study of logic, and it is faster than the truth-table method (which requires a table with 2^{n} rows for a sentence with n propositional letters). For these reasons, Wilfrid Hodges for example presents semantic tableaux in his introductory textbook, Logic, and Melvin Fitting does the same in his presentation of first-order logic for computer scientists, First-order logic and automated theorem proving.

One starts out with the intention of proving that a certain set $\Gamma \,$ of formulae entail another formula $\varphi\,$, given a set of rules determined by the semantics of the formulae's connectives (and quantifiers, in first-order logic). The method is to assume the concurrent truth of every member of $\Gamma \,$ and of $\neg \varphi$ (the negation of $\varphi\,$), and then to apply the rules to branch this list into a tree-like structure of (simpler) formulae until every possible branch contains a contradiction. At this point it will have been established that $\Gamma \cup \{ \neg \varphi \}$ is inconsistent, and thus that the formulae of $\Gamma\,$ together entail $\varphi \,$.

=== Beth models ===
These are a class of relational models for non-classical logic (cf. Kripke semantics).

== Books ==
- Beth, Evert W. (1959). The Foundations of Mathematics: A Study in the Philosophy of Science. Amsterdam: North-Holland. pp. XXVI + 722.
- —; Piaget, Jean (1961). Épistémologie mathématique et psychologie. Paris: Presses Universitaires de France (P.U.F.). p. 352.
- — (1962). Formal Methods: An Introduction to Symbolic Logic and to the Study of Effective Operations in Arithmetic and Logic. Dordrecht-Holland: D. Reidel Publishing Company.
- — (1969). Moderne logica (in Dutch). Assen, Nederland: Van Gorcum & Comp. N.V. "Uitgegeven met steun van het Prins Bernhard Fonds"
- — (1971). Aspects of Modern Logic. Dordrecht-Holland: D. Reidel Publishing Company.

== See also ==
- Gerrit Mannoury
- Arend Heyting
