= Listed buildings in Wortley, South Yorkshire =

Wortley is a civil parish in the metropolitan borough of Barnsley, South Yorkshire, England. The parish contains 25 listed buildings that are recorded in the National Heritage List for England. Of these, one is listed at Grade II*, the middle of the three grades, and the others are at Grade II, the lowest grade. The parish contains the village of Wortley and the surrounding countryside. In the parish is the country house, Wortley Hall, which is listed, together with associated structures and items in the gardens and grounds. The other listed buildings include houses and cottages, two cross bases, a church, a public house, a milestone, and three mileposts.

== Key ==
Grade	Criteria
II*	Particularly important buildings of more than special interest
II	Buildings of national importance and special interest

== Buildings ==
Name and location	Photograph	Date	Notes	Grade
Base of Cundy Cross; 53.47438°N 1.53331°W		16th or 17th century	The base of the cross is in gritstone. It consults of a rough block about 0.75 metres (2 ft 6 in) square, with a socket for a shaft which is drained by a groove. The groove is flanked by two other holes.	II
Well Houses; 53.49837°N 1.54000°W		Mid 17th century	The later house dates from the mid-18th century. The houses are in sandstone with roofs of stone slate and asbestos sheet. The older house on the left has two storeys and one bay. It contains quoins, a doorway with a quoined surround, and mullioned windows. The later house on the right has two storeys and attics, three bays, and an outshut. It has quoins, a floor band, a central doorway with a projecting keystone and a hood mould band, another doorway to the left with a plain surround, and casement windows.	II
Cross base with sundial pedestal 53.49024°N 1.53840°W		1679	The sundial pedestal is dated, the cross base is older, and they are in the churchyard of St Leonard's Church. They are in sandstone, and consist of a three-stepped square plinth, with an inset square shaft and the date on one side.	II
Wortley Hall, terrace, steps and wall 53.49133°N 1.53061°W		1742–46	A country house initially designed by Giacomo Leoni, with a succession of later additions. It is in sandstone with slate roofs, mainly in two storeys, with a south front of seven bays, a five-bay rear wing on the left, and an east front of eight bays. The south front has a moulded plinth, and the middle three bays project with four attached Ionic columns and a pediment containing a coat of arms. The outer bays are flanked by Ionic pilasters. In the centre is a French window, and the other windows are sashes, some with cornices, and the others with balustraded aprons, architraves, pulvinated friezes, and dentilled pediments. On the east front is an octagonal lantern with archivolted openings under a lead-roofed dome with a finial. The front terrace has a retaining wall and steps flanked by urns.	II*
Ivy Cottage; 53.48994°N 1.53850°W	—	Mid 18th century	The house, which was extended in the 19th century, is in sandstone with a stone slate roof. There are two storeys, two bays, and a single-storey extension on the right. The doorway is in the centre of the main range, and the windows are 20th-century casements, one with a mullion.	II
Wortley Arms; 53.49008°N 1.53808°W		Mid 18th century	The public house is in sandstone, with quoins, and a Welsh slate roof with gable copings and shaped kneelers. There are two storeys and attics, five bays, and a later rear wing. The central doorway has moulded quoins and a cornice on brackets. The windows are sashes, all with cornices.	II
St Leonard's Church; 53.49041°N 1.53837°W		1753–54	The oldest part of the church is the tower, with the body of the church rebuilt in about 1811–15. It is in sandstone with a stone slate roof, and is in Gothic Revival style. The church consists of a nave and a chancel in one cell, a south porch, a north vestry, and a west tower. The tower has four stages, string courses, slit windows, clock faces on the north and south fronts, two-light bell openings, and an embattled parapet.	II
Hermit Hill Farmhouse; 53.50382°N 1.51546°W	—	1760	The farmhouse, which was extended in the 19th century, is in sandstone with quoins and a stone slate roof. There are two storeys and three bays. On the front is a porch, and a doorway with a dated lintel, and the windows are sashes.	II
Carlton House; 53.47694°N 1.53190°W		Late 18th century	The oldest part of the house is the rear wing, with the main range dating from the early 19th century. The house is in sandstone with a hipped stone slate roof. There are two storeys, a main range of five bays, a rear wing of three bays, and an extension in the angle. Steps lead up to a central doorway, with a fanlight, and a lintel grooved as voussoirs, and the windows are sashes. The rear wing has quoins, a bay window in an arched recess, a tripartite window, and a French window.	II
Milestone at junction with Bank Lane; 53.47452°N 1.53327°W		Late 18th century	The milestone at the junction of Woodhead Road with Bank Lane is in gritstone. It consists of a square pillar about 0.75 metres (2 ft 6 in) high, and is inscribed on each side with the distances to Rotherham, Huddersfield, Manchester, and Sheffield.	II
Stable block, Wortley Hall; 53.49135°N 1.53239°W	—	c.1800	The stable block is in sandstone on a plinth, with a cornice and blocking course, and a hipped slate roof. It is partly in two storeys, and is symmetrical with 13 bays The middle three bays project under a pediment with a clock in the tympanum. In the centre is a carriage entrance with a rusticated round arch with an impost band, and on the roof is an octagonal cupola with an archivolted opening in each face, a cornice, a balustrade with ball finials, and a lead dome with an apex finial. The flanking bays contain blind round-arched recesses with rusticated voussoirs, and on the roof are louvred ventilators. At the rear are doorways, sash windows, and dormers, and in the returns are blind Venetian windows.	II
Gatepiers and railings, northeast end of The Avenue; 53.49191°N 1.53294°W	—	Early 19th century	The gate piers and railings are at the northeast entrance to the grounds of the Wortley Hall estate. The piers are in sandstone, with an inner pair linked by a plinth walls with decorative ironwork to an outer pair of piers. Each pier is rusticated with a frieze block and a cornice, the inner piers with ball finials.	II
Gatepiers and railings, southwest end of The Avenue; 53.49049°N 1.53653°W		Early 19th century	The gate piers and railings are at the southwest entrance to the grounds of the Wortley Hall estate. The piers are in sandstone, with an inner pair of piers, a side gate on the left, and smaller outer piers. Each pier is square and rusticated with a cornice, and the larger inner piers also have a frieze block with festoons, and a ball finial. Outside the inner piers are iron railings.	II
Balustraded wall, Wortley Hall; 53.49169°N 1.52990°W	—	Early 19th century (probable)	The retaining wall across the east front of the hall is in sandstone. There are 18 bays of balustrading, with steps and a detached pier at the north end, and a three-sided recess at the south end. The end and alternate dies have moulded plinths, panels, and cornices, some are surmounted by decorated vases and others by ball finials.	II
Circular pool and statue, Wortley Hall; 53.49079°N 1.53019°W		Early 19th century (probable)	The circular pool is in the centre of the garden to the south of the hall. The lining is in sandstone, and it has moulded segmental copings at the level of the footpath. In the middle of the pool is a circular pedestal with a moulded base, surmounted by the statue of a male figure on three entwined dolphins, the arms broken.	II
Outbuilding and Garden Cottage, Wortley Hall; 53.49118°N 1.53252°W	—	Early 19th century	The stable block with hayloft and the cottage are in sandstone with a hipped stone slate roof. There are two storeys, four bays, and two lean-to outshuts. The cottage on the right has a doorway with a fanlight, and sash windows with lintels grooved as voussoirs. The outbuilding has a doorway with a fanlight, a sash window, and a garage door on the right, and in the upper floor are circular pitching holes.	II
Terrace steps and walls, Wortley Hall; 53.49090°N 1.52983°W		Early 19th century	The steps and walls in the garden to the south of the hall are in sandstone. There are two sets of steps to each terrace on the west side of the garden, and a double flight down to the eastern terrace. At the northeast corner of the garden is a round-ended projection that has piers with moulded coping and surmounted by gadrooned vases.	II
Arbour, Wortley Hall; 53.49021°N 1.53023°W	—	Early to mid 19th century	The arbour in the garden of the hall is in sandstone. It is surrounded on three sides by dwarf walls with balustrades on a moulded plinth, with square balusters, and moulded copings. On the front, the corners are supported by dies with scrolled brackets decorated with rose and oak leaf motifs.	II
Ice house, Wortley Hall; 53.48987°N 1.53158°W	—	Early to mid 19th century	The ice house is by a fish pond in the garden of the hall. It is in red brick and sandstone, and consists of a mound of earth on which is a coped brick upstand with pins for hatches. In the top is a rebated round hole, and on the south side is a stone feeder channel.	II
6 Halifax Road; 53.49083°N 1.53800°W	—	1840	A sandstone house with quoins, and a stone slate roof with chamfered gable copings, shaped kneelers, and an apex finial. There are two storeys, and a T-shaped plan, consisting of two bays, the right bay projecting and gabled. In the left bay is a doorway with a chamfered and quoined surround, and a Tudor arched lintel. Above is a hood mould, which continues over the window to the left. The windows are recessed, chamfered and mullioned, and in the right return is a gabled porch.	II
Milepost near Town End Farm; 53.47487°N 1.52010°W		Mid 19th century	The milepost is on the northeast side of the A629 road. It is in cast iron, and has angled sides and top. In raised lettering are indicated the distances to Sheffield and Penistone.	II
Milepost at junction with Woodhead Road; 53.48616°N 1.53553°W	—	Mid 19th century	The milepost is on the southwest side of the A629 road. It is in cast iron, and has angled sides and top. In raised lettering are indicated the distances to Sheffield and Penistone.	II
Milepost at Mill Moor Plantation; 53.49757°N 1.54811°W		Mid 19th century	The milepost is on the northeast side of the A629 road. It is in cast iron, and has angled sides and top. In raised lettering are indicated the distances to Sheffield and Penistone.	II
Top Lodge; 53.49025°N 1.53649°W	—	Mid 19th century	The lodge at the entrance to the Wortley Hall estate is in sandstone, with a band, modillions, a moulded cornice, a blocking course, and a hipped Westmorland slate roof. There is a single storey and three bays, the middle bay projecting and containing a doorway with a slab hood on shaped brackets. In the returns are casement windows with hoods.	II
The Old Vicarage, wall and gateway 53.48877°N 1.53584°W	—	1878–80	The vicarage was designed by Basil Champneys in Jacobean Revival style. It is in sandstone, and has a stone slate roof with shaped gables, moulded copings, and ball finials. There are two storeys and fronts of three and two bays, each bay gabled and with a panel in the gable. The porch contains a round-arched doorway with a moulded surround, a keystone, and a pediment with a parapet and a final. The windows are mullioned and transomed, and on the garden front are two canted bay windows. On the left return, a curtain wall encloses a single-storey outbuilding.	II
