= Archibald Montagu-Stuart-Wortley-Mackenzie, 3rd Earl of Wharncliffe =

English soldier, peer and landowner

The Right Honourable The Earl of Wharncliffe JP DL

Personal details
- Born: Archibald Ralph Montagu-Stuart-Wortley-Mackenzie; 17 April 1892
- Died: 16 May 1953 (aged 61)
- Spouse: Lady Maud Wentworth-Fitzwilliam (after 1918)
- Children: 5
- Parent(s): Francis Montagu-Stuart-Wortley-Mackenzie, 2nd Earl of Wharncliffe; Ellen Gallwey
- Education: Eton College
- Alma mater: Royal Military College, Sandhurst

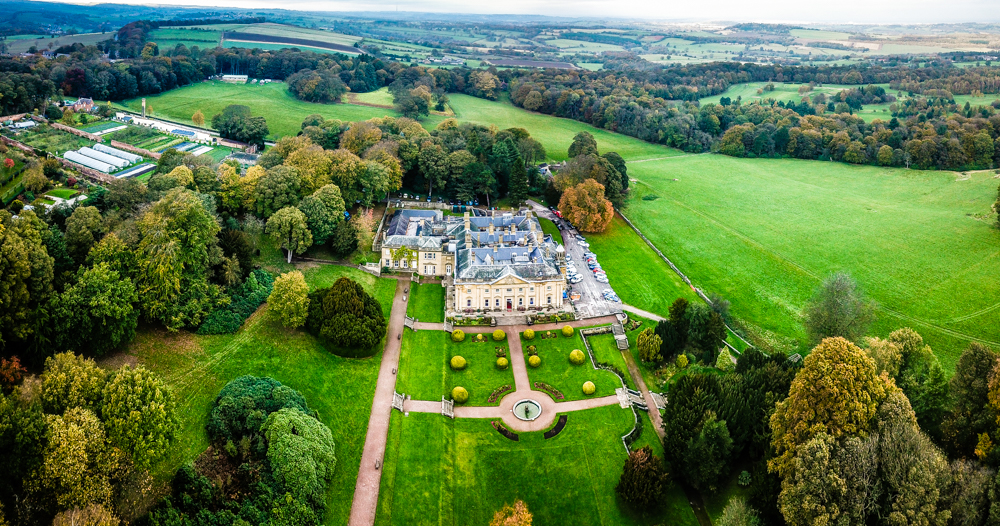
Wortley Hall

Archibald Ralph Montagu-Stuart-Wortley-Mackenzie, 3rd Earl of Wharncliffe JP DL (17 April 1892 – 16 May 1953) was an English soldier, peer, and landowner, a member of the House of Lords.

== Early life and education ==
Lord Wharncliffe was the son of Francis Montagu-Stuart-Wortley-Mackenzie, 2nd Earl of Wharncliffe and his wife Ellen Gallwey. He was educated at Eton and the Royal Military College, Sandhurst, from which he was commissioned into the Life Guards.

== Career ==
Wharncliffe was aide-de-camp to Sydney Buxton, 1st Earl Buxton, Governor-General of South Africa between 1915 and 1916, then saw active service during the First World War, rising to the rank of captain. On 8 May 1926, his father died and he succeeded as Earl of Wharncliffe and Viscount Carlton and as the owner of the Wortley Hall estate in Yorkshire.

Wharncliffe was a Justice of the Peace (JP) and a Deputy Lieutenant (DL) for the West Riding of Yorkshire.

During the Second World War, Wortley Hall was requisitioned for use by the British Army and deteriorated. In 1950, Wharncliffe sold it to be used as a training college.

== Marriage and children ==
On 24 March 1918, Wharncliffe married Lady Maud Lillian Elfreda Mary Wentworth-Fitzwilliam, a daughter of William Wentworth-Fitzwilliam, 7th Earl Fitzwilliam and Lady Maud Frederica Elizabeth Dundas, daughter of Lawrence Dundas, 1st Marquess of Zetland. They had five children:

- Lady Ann Lavinia Maud Montagu-Stuart-Wortley-Mackenzie (25 January 1919 – 2022), who married Commander Vivian Russell Salvin Bowlby in 1939.
- Lady Mary Diana Montagu-Stuart-Wortley (2 June 1920 - 19 September 1997), married as his second wife Henry Pelham-Clinton-Hope, 9th Duke of Newcastle.
- Lady Barbara Maureen Montagu-Stuart-Wortley-Mackenzie (26 August 1921 - 13 December 2014), married David Cecil Ricardo in 1943.
- Lady Mary Rosemary Marie-Gabrielle Montagu-Stuart-Wortley-Mackenzie (11 June 1930 - 7 September 2017), married Sir David Courtenay Mansel Lewis, the last Lord Lieutenant of Carmarthenshire.
- Alan James Montagu-Stuart-Wortley-Mackenzie, 4th Earl of Wharncliffe (23 March 1935 - 3 June 1987), married Aline Margaret Bruce in 1957.

== Death ==
Lord Wharncliffe died on 16 May 1953 and was succeeded in his titles by his only son, Alan.

Peerage of the United Kingdom
Preceded by Francis Montagu-Stuart-Wortley-Mackenzie	Earl of Wharncliffe; 1926–1953	Succeeded by Alan Montagu-Stuart-Wortley-Mackenzie
