= Lady Emmeline Stuart-Wortley =

English poet and writer

Lady Emmeline Stuart-Worley
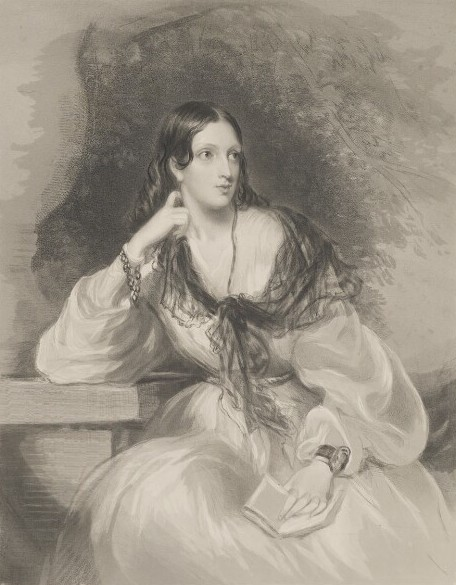
- Portrait by Frederick Christian Lewis Sr (1779–1856), after Sir Francis Grant (1803–1878)
- Born: Lady Emmeline Charlotte Elizabeth Manners; 1806
- Died: 20 October 1855 (aged 48–49)
- Occupations: Poet, writer
- Spouse: Charles Stuart-Wortley-Mackenzie (m. 1831; died 1844)
- Children: Victoria, Lady Welby
- Parents: John Manners, 5th Duke of Rutland; Lady Elizabeth Howard

Lady Emmeline Charlotte Elizabeth Stuart-Wortley (née Manners; 1806 – 20 October 1855) was an English poet and writer, best known for her Travels in the United States, etc. During 1849 and 1850. She was editor of The Keepsake volumes for 1837 and 1840.

She was a daughter of John Manners, 5th Duke of Rutland, and his wife, the former Lady Elizabeth Howard. On 17 February 1831, married Hon. Charles Stuart-Wortley-Mackenzie, a son of James Stuart-Wortley-Mackenzie, 1st Baron Wharncliffe. They had a daughter, Victoria, Lady Welby.

After the death of her husband in 1844, she began to travel as a wealthy Victorian widow, along with her daughter, Victoria. In October 1855, she died of dysentery in the area between Antioch and Beirut, while travelling through Ottoman Empire regions following the history of the early Christians.

== Bibliography ==
- Poems (London: John Murray, 1833)
- London at Night, and other Poems (London: Longman, Rees, Orme, Brown, Green, and Longman, 1834)
- Unloved of Earth, and other Poems (Murray, 1834)
- The Knight and the Enchantress, with other Poems (Longman [etc.], 1835)
- The Village Churchyard; And Other Poems (Longman [etc.], 1835)
- Travelling Sketches in Rhyme (Longman [etc.], 1835)
- The Visionary, a Fragment, with other Poems (Longman [etc.], 1836–1839)
- Fragments and Fancies (London: Saunders and Otley, 1837)
- Hours at Naples, and other Poems (Saunders and Otley, 1837)
- Impressions of Italy and Other Poems (Saunders and Otley, 1837)
- Lays of Leisure Hours, 2 vols. (London: Thomas Hookham, 1838)
- Queen Berengaria's Courtesy, and other Poems, 3 vols. (London: J. Rickerby, J. Hatchard and Son, 1838)
- The Visionary. Canto III (Joseph Rickerby, 1839)
- Sonnets, written chiefly during a tour through Holland, Germany, Italy, Turkey, and Hungary (Joseph Rickerby, 1839)
- Jairah, A Dramatic Mystery, and Other Poems (Joseph Rickerby, 1840)
- Eva: Or, The Error. A Play In Five Acts (Joseph Rickerby [etc.], 1840)
- Lillia-Bianca. A Tale of Italy (Joseph Rickerby, 1841)
- Alphonzo Algarves. A play in five acts in verse (Joseph Rickerby [etc.], 1841)
- Angiolina Del' Albano; Or, Truth And Treachery. A Play, In Five Acts (London: How and Parsons [etc.], 1841)
- The Maiden of Moscow: A Poem (How and Parsons, 1842)
- Moonshine. A Comedy (London: W. S. Johnson, 1843)
- Adelaida. Or Letters &c. of Madame Von Regenburg. To which are added Poems (London: Printed by Moyes and Barclay, 1843)
- Ernest Mountjoy, a comedietta in three acts and in prose (London, 1844)
- Little Bo-peep, with variations and illustrations (London: Joseph Cundall, 1846)
- The Great Exhibition. Honour to labour, a Lay of 1851 (W. N. Wright, 1851)
- On the approaching close of The Great Exhibition. And other poems (W. N. Wright, 1851)
- Travels in the United States, etc.,: during 1849 and 1850, 3 vols. (London: Richard Bentley, 1851)
- [Victoria Welby] A young traveller's journal of a tour in North and South America during the year 1850 (London: T. Bosworth, 1852)
- &c. (London: Thomas Bosworth, 1853)
- La Estrella. Romanza, sheet music, the words and music by Lady E.S. Wortley (London [1853])
- Al arma. Una cançion de guerra, sheet music, the words and music by Lady E.S. Wortley (London [1853])
- The New Crystal Palace march founded on the song England for ever, sheet music, arranged by T.W. Naumann (London [1854])
- A Visit to Portugal and Madeira (London: Chapman and Hall, 1854)
- The sweet South, 2 vols. (London: Printed for private circulation by G. Barclay, 1856) – Vol. I; Vol. II

=== On Lady Emmeline Stuart-Wortley ===
- Mrs. Henry Cust, with a preface by Sir Ronald Storrs, Wanderers: Episodes from the Travels of Lady Emmeline Stuart-Wortley and her daughter Victoria 1849-1855 (London: Jonathan Cape, 1928)
