= Emmeline Cust =

English writer, editor, translator and sculptor

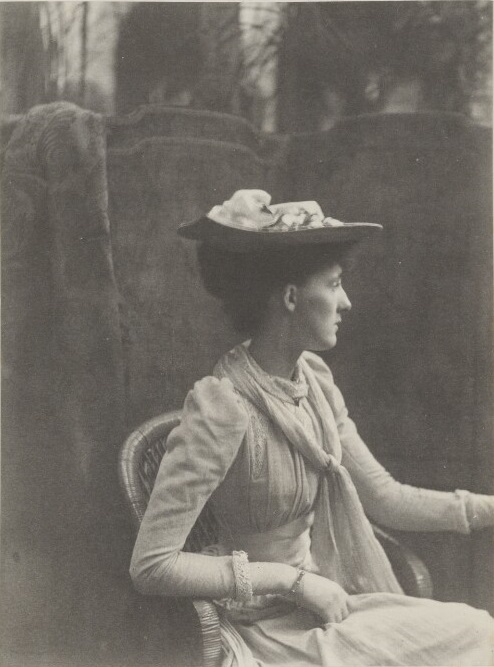
- Cust in the 1890s; photo by Cyril Flower
- Born: Emmeline Mary Elizabeth Welby; 5 August 1867; Denton, Lincolnshire
- Died: 29 September 1955 (aged 88)
- Spouse: Harry Cust (m. 1893; died 1917)
- Parents: Sir William Earle Welby-Gregory (father); Victoria Stuart-Wortley (mother)

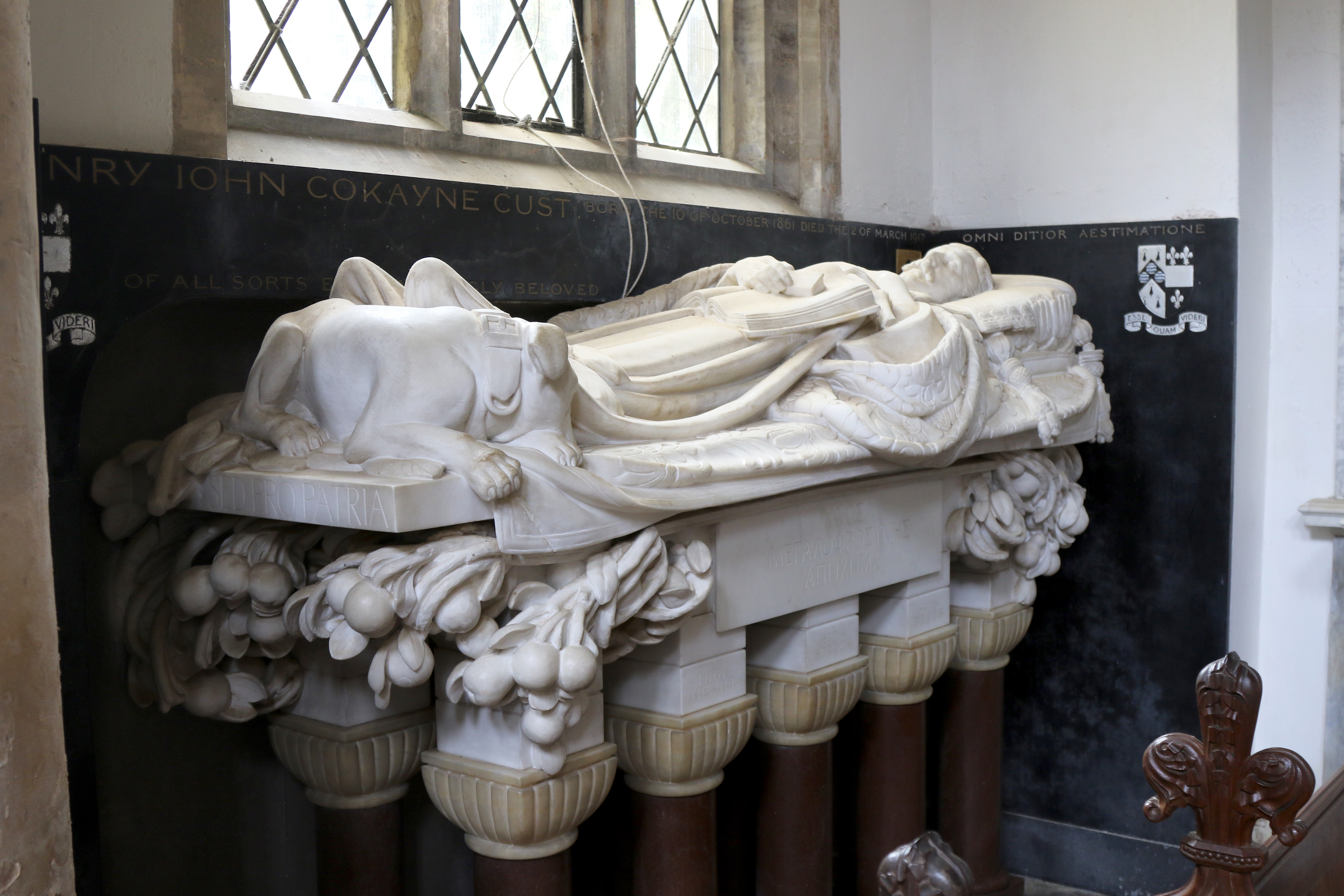
Nina Cust's memorial to Henry John Cockayne Cust in St Peter and St Paul's Church, Belton

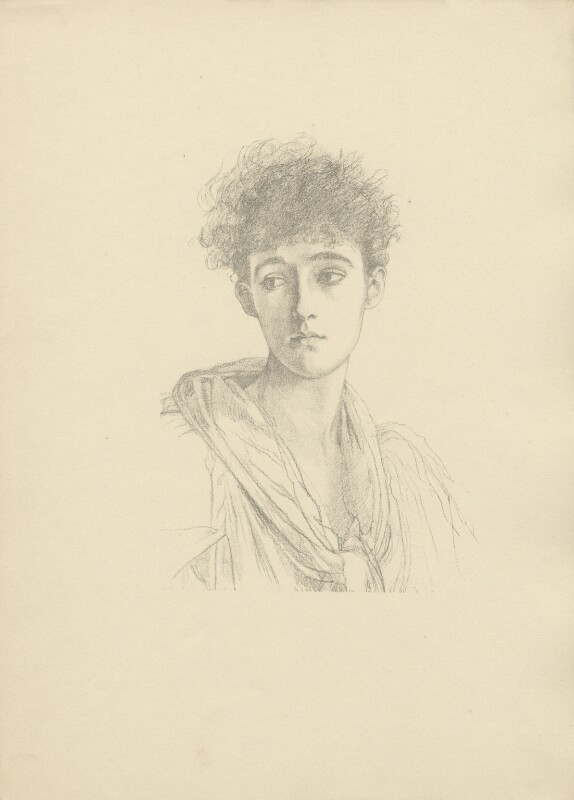
Emmeline Mary Elizabeth ('Nina') Cust (née Welby-Gregory) after Violet Manners, Duchess of Rutland lithograph, 1890s

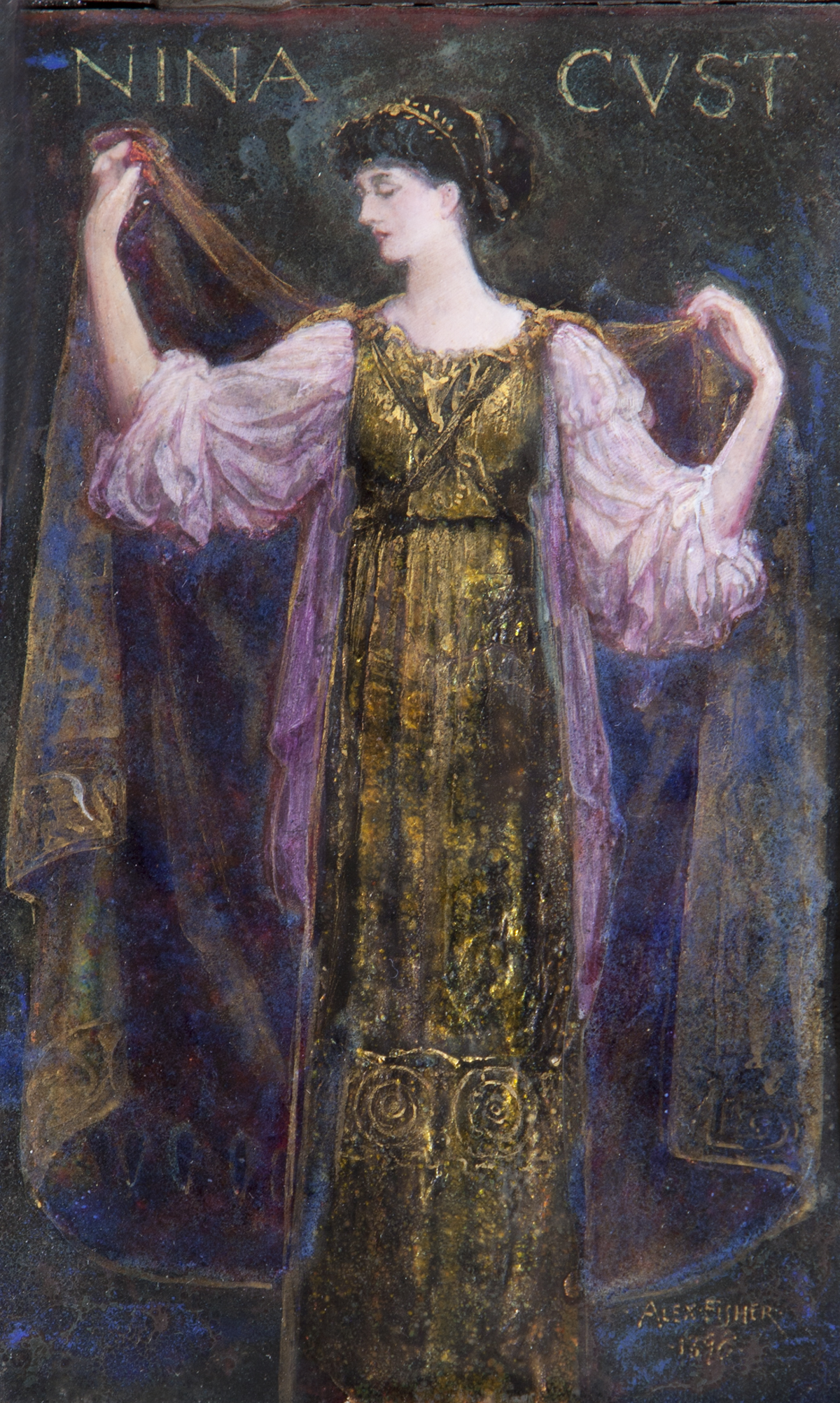
An enamelled portrait by Alexander Fisher, 1898

Emmeline 'Nina' Cust (1867–1955) was an English writer, editor, translator and sculptor. She was a member of The Souls, an upper class circle that challenged the conventions and attitudes of their class in the late nineteenth and early twentieth centuries.

== Personal life ==
Cust was born at Denton Hall to Victoria, Lady Welby, a philosophical writer and Sir William Earle Welby-Gregory, a politician and landowner. Her maternal grandmother, Lady Emmeline Stuart-Wortley was a renowned Victorian poet and travel writer.

In 1893, Cust married another member of The Souls, Henry John Cockayne-Cust known as Harry. She supported her husband in much of his work, including correspondence for the Central Committee for National Patriotic Organisations. Cust was devoted to her husband, despite a reputedly unhappy marriage that lasted until his death in 1917. A detailed look at Nina and Harry, as individuals and as a married couple, can be found in 'Tangled Souls: Love & Scandal among the Victorian Aristocracy' by Jane Dismore (pub. The History Press, 2022).

Cust was a direct neighbour of sculptor Jacob Epstein when they both lived at Hyde Park Gate in London.

== Writing and translation ==
Cust wrote a biography of her mother, Victoria, Lady Welby's first thirty years, Wanderers: episodes from the travels of Lady Emmeline Stuart-Wortley and her daughter Victoria, 1849-1855. She also published accounts of her grandmother's travels. Cust contributed shorter pieces to contemporary periodicals including the journal of the English Association.

Virginia Woolf is known to have reviewed at least one of Cust's published books, probably 'Gentleman Errant'.

Cust's translation of 'Semantics; studies in the science of meaning' by Michel Jules Alfred Bréal presented the text's first appearance in English.

=== Other published works include ===
- Gentlemen Errant: being the journeys and adventures of four noblemen in Europe during the fifteenth and sixteenth centuries, first published by John Murray, London, in 1909
- Not all the suns; poems, 1917-1944, first published by Nicholson & Watson, London, in 1944
- A Tub of Gold Fishes, first published by James Bain, London
- Dilectissimo, first published by Macmillan and Co., London, in 1932

== Artwork ==
Cust may have attended the Académie Julian in Paris, although it is unclear which art forms she trained in. It is also possible that she studied sculpture in London.

Cust exhibited her sculpture at the Royal Academy in 1906 showing a bust of her niece and in 1927, part of a model of her husband. She exhibited both in the United Kingdom and abroad, with works shown in Manchester, Liverpool, Birmingham and Paris.

In 1884, Cust was the subject of a portrait bust by Alfred Gilbert. Alexander Fisher produced an enamelled portrait of Cust in 1898.

== Works held in collections ==
Cust's sculpture is represented in British collections including the following works,

Title	Year	Medium	Gallery no.	Gallery	Location
Adelbert Wellington Brownlow Cust (1844–1921), 3rd Earl Brownlow	1908	bronze	436816	National Trust, Belton House	Lincolnshire, England
Adelbert Wellington Brownlow Cust (1844–1921), 3rd Earl Brownlow	1908	marble	436814	National Trust, Belton House	Lincolnshire, England
Henry John Cockayne Cust (1861–1917)	c.1905	plaster	436783	National Trust, Belton House	Lincolnshire, England
Henry John Cockayne Cust (1861–1917)	1905	marble	436777	National Trust, Belton House	Lincolnshire, England
Self-portrait	1900–1955	marble	436834	National Trust, Belton House	Lincolnshire, England
The Hand of Katherine Hariet Kinloch (d.1952), Lady Brownlow	1952	marble	436781	National Trust, Belton House	Lincolnshire, England
