= Wortley Hall =

Former stately home in Wortley, Yorkshire, England

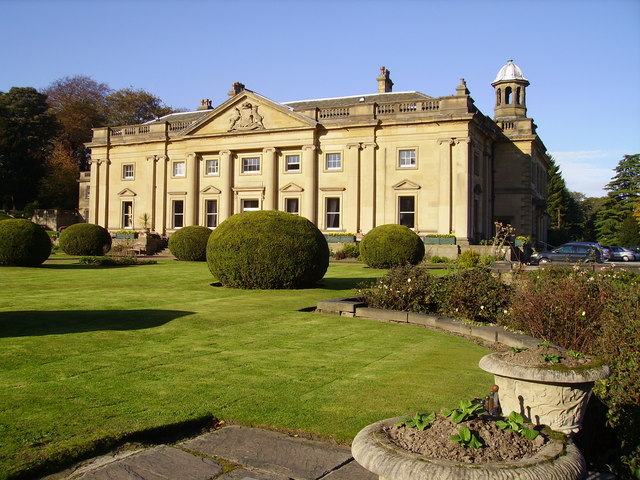
- Wortley Hall seen from the gardens

- Location within South Yorkshire

General information
- Type: Stately home
- Location: Wortley, South Yorkshire, England
- Coordinates: 53.4912°N 1.5306°W

Website
- www.wortleyhall.org.uk

Listed Building – Grade II*
- Official name: Wortley Hall
- Designated: 25 April 1969
- Reference no.: 1192585

Wortley Hall is a former stately home in the small village of Wortley, located south of Barnsley, Yorkshire. It has been owned by individuals and organisations associated with British trade unions and the wider labour movement since 1951. It operates as a non-profit co-operative and is registered under the 2014 Co-operative and Community Benefit Societies Act (Registration Number 14116R).

The Grade II* listed building was built from 1731 to 1761 on the site of the previous hall, and is constructed of sandstone ashlar with graduated slate roofs to an irregular floor plan, mostly in two storeys with a seven-bay south front. The hall has formal gardens and is encircled by approximately 26 acres of ancient grounds and woodlands that are Grade II listed.

The society is currently used by several trade unions and other organisations as a venue for residential training courses and other meetings. The house and grounds are open to visitors, can be booked by the public for social gatherings, and is a licensed venue for weddings. Yearly highlights include the South Yorkshire Festival and the Vintage Car Show, which attract over 2000 visitors.

Shareholders elect a management board, composed of twelve volunteers, at the Annual General Meeting. The board appoint the General Manager who oversees the day-to-day running of the Hall. The current General Manager is Johnathan da Rosa, the President is Brian Steele, the Political Secretary is Michael Bailey, and the two Vice Presidents are Kath Sims and Jess Whyke.

== History ==
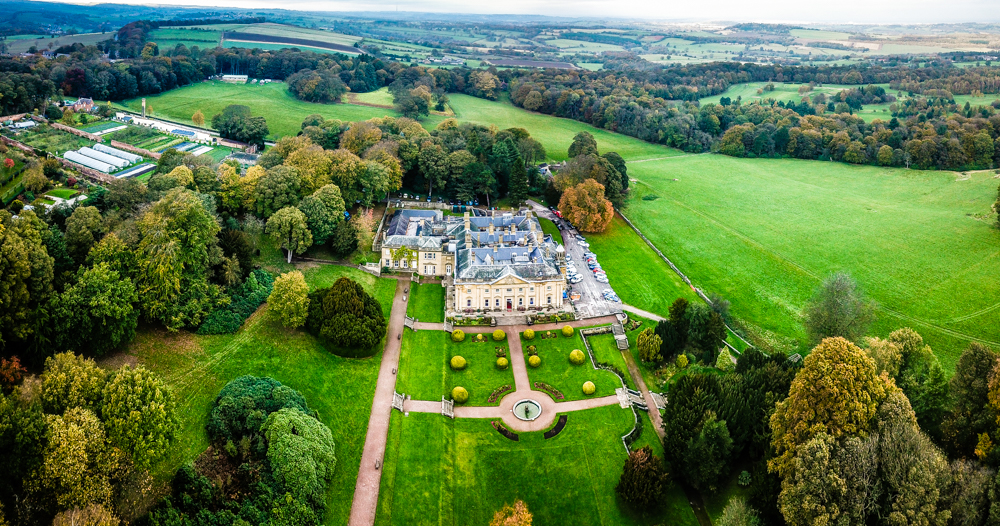
Aerial view of Wortley Hall and surroundings

A manor house at Wortley was rebuilt by Sir Richard Wortley in 1586. During the English Civil War his son Sir Francis Wortley, 1st Baronet, like his powerful ally Sir Thomas Wentworth of Wentworth Woodhouse, was a Royalist and fought for the King, allowing Wortley Hall to be used as a garrison for 150 dragoons. However, in 1644 Sir Francis was captured and imprisoned in the Tower of London and on his release in 1649 obliged to pay a heavy fine to recover his property. Wortley then eventually descended to an illegitimate daughter who married Sidney Montagu, second son of Edward Montagu, 1st Earl of Sandwich, c. 1670.

The Hall was significantly remodelled by Giacomo Leoni in 1742–46 and the East Wing added in 1757–61 for Sir Edward Wortley Montagu, MP and Ambassador to the Ottoman Empire who died in 1761. The builder of this section was John Platt of Rotherham.

Montagu left the Wortley Hall estate to his daughter Mary. In 1735 she had eloped with John Stuart, 3rd Earl of Bute, who later became prime minister. From her it passed in 1794 to their son, Colonel James Archibald Stuart (1747–1818), who added the surname Wortley to his own and later also added Mackenzie. He left the estate to his son Colonel James Archibald Stuart-Wortley-Mackenzie (1776–1845) who was one of the two MPs for Yorkshire from 1818 to 1826, when he was created Baron Wharncliffe.

Edward Montagu-Stuart-Wortley-Mackenzie, 3rd Baron Wharncliffe, was created Earl of Wharncliffe in 1876. The Hall was the seat of the Earls of Wharncliffe until the Second World War, when it was used by the British Army, after which its structural condition deteriorated.

In 1950, a group of local trade union activists identified the hall as a possible educational and holiday centre, and established a co-operative which succeeded in purchasing the hall for those purposes. It was formally opened on 5 May 1951.

== In popular culture ==
In 1980, the hall was used as the setting of the country estate in the Ken Loach TV film The Gamekeeper.

The hall was highlighted in series six, episode 12 of Great British Railway Journeys by Michael Portillo on BBC Two on 20 January 2015. Michael Portillo described its current role, met the general manager and stayed the night. He showed the links to trade unionism.

== See also ==
- Grade II* listed buildings in South Yorkshire
- Listed buildings in Wortley, South Yorkshire
- Earl of Wharncliffe
