= Wortley, South Yorkshire =

Village and civil parish in South Yorkshire, England

Coordinates: 53.4833°N 1.5333°W

Wortley
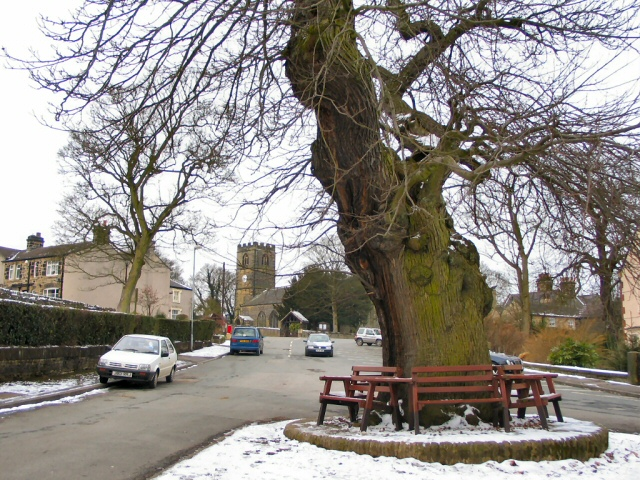
- Village centre

- Location within South Yorkshire
- Population: 626 (2011 census)
- Civil parish: Wortley
- Metropolitan borough: Barnsley
- Metropolitan county: South Yorkshire
- Region: Yorkshire and the Humber
- Country: England
- Sovereign state: United Kingdom
- Post town: SHEFFIELD
- Postcode district: S35
- Dialling code: 0114
- Police: South Yorkshire
- Fire: South Yorkshire
- Ambulance: Yorkshire
- UK Parliament: Barnsley West and Penistone

Wortley is a village and civil parish in the Metropolitan Borough of Barnsley, South Yorkshire, England. At the 2001 census it had a population of 579, increasing to 626 at the 2011 Census. Wortley is mentioned in the 1086 Domesday Book as Wirtleie.

== History ==
The name Wortley derives from the Old English wyrtlēah meaning 'plant/vegetable wood or clearing'.

Wortley grew up as a settlement where the Sheffield to Halifax road crossed the Cheshire to Rotherham route. In 1250, a Sunday market was briefly established, but this was quickly suppressed by the monks who owned the right to hold markets in Barnsley. In 1307, the village finally received a Royal Charter to hold a weekly Thursday market and an annual three-day fair at Whitsun. The market and fair both soon ceased, and an eighteenth-century attempt to revive the fair was unsuccessful.

St. Leonard’s Church in Wortley forms part of the United Benefice of Tankersley, Thurgoland and Wortley within the Diocese of Sheffield.

Historically there is evidence that there has been a church in Wortley, dedicated to St. Leonard, since at least 1268 and probably even earlier though little if anything exists of that building and many records have been lost. However, an examination of the church as it is today indicates that much of the building dates from the 18th century.

There was a chapel on the site in 13th century, although the present building is post medieval. The oldest part is the tower, rebuilt in 1753–54. The rest of the building is the result of various rebuilding works from 1815.

Wortley is known for the nearby Wortley Top Forge, at Thurgoland, it dates back to at least the 1640's, but is most famous for the notorious highwayman Swift Nick (John Nevison, 1639–1684) who was born and raised there. It was really he (and not Dick Turpin) who made the famous ride on horseback from London to York in order to establish an alibi for a robbery. Wharncliffe House, Wortley, was home of the Earl of Wharncliffe until his death in 1987.

Wortley is home to Wortley Mens Club, the winner of the Campaign for Real Ale (CAMRA) club of the year 2014 for the entire Yorkshire region and subsequent super regional winner for the North East, making it one of the best four clubs in the UK. It has now been voted the best club in Britain by CAMRA for 2015 beating 28,000 other entrants. It hosts a variety of events including an annual charity beer festival held on or around 1 August every year to coincide with Yorkshire Day.

Located in Wortley is Wortley Hall, a Grade II listed building since 1990. The parish contains the hamlet of Bromley and Howbrook.

Wortley was historically a chapelry in the ancient parish of Tankersley, in the Wapentake of Staincross, West Riding of Yorkshire, 5 miles south-west from Barnsley.

Wortley itself became a parish in 1746. The parish covers about 35 square miles and includes some small hamlets nearby.

Wortley gave its name to the Wortley Rural District, which was abolished on 1 April 1974.

== Notable persons ==
Wortley was the birthplace of the late Sergeant Ian McKay VC of the Parachute Regiment, awarded a posthumous Victoria Cross as a result of his actions during the Falklands War, the last action to be recognised by a Victoria Cross in the 20th century.

== See also ==
- Listed buildings in Wortley, South Yorkshire
