= Edward Montagu-Stuart-Wortley-Mackenzie, 1st Earl of Wharncliffe =

British peer and railway executive (1827-1899)

Edward Montagu-Stuart-Wortley-Mackenzie
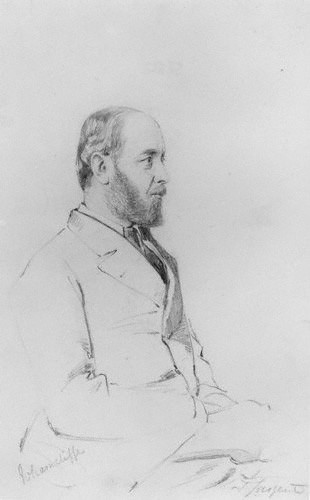
- Edward Montagu Stuart Granville Montagu-Stuart-Wortley-Mackenzie, 1st Earl of Wharncliffe
- Born: 15 December 1827
- Died: 13 May 1899 (aged 71)
- Spouse: Lady Susan Charlotte (m. 1855)
- Children: 0
- Parents: John Stuart-Wortley (father); Lady Georgiana Elizabeth Ryder (mother)
- Relatives: James Stuart-Wortley (brother); Charles James Stuart-Wortley (uncle); James Stuart-Wortley (paternal grandfather); Dudley Ryder (maternal grandfather); Henry Douglas-Scott-Montagu (brother-in-law); Henry Lascelles (father-in-law)

Edward Montagu Stuart Granville Montagu-Stuart-Wortley-Mackenzie, 1st Earl of Wharncliffe (15 December 1827 – 13 May 1899), was a British peer and railway executive.

== Early life ==
A member of the Stuart family headed by the Marquess of Bute, Wharncliffe was the eldest son of John Stuart-Wortley-Mackenzie, 2nd Baron Wharncliffe, and his wife Lady Georgiana Elizabeth, daughter of Dudley Ryder, 1st Earl of Harrowby.

== Career ==
He succeeded his father in the barony in 1855. He was Chairman of Manchester, Sheffield and Lincolnshire Railway, which under his leadership became the Great Central Railway. In 1876 he was created Viscount Carlton, of Carlton in the West Riding in the County of York, and Earl of Wharncliffe, in the West Riding of the County of York, with remainder to his younger brother the Hon. Francis Dudley Stuart-Wortley-Mackenzie. In 1880 he assumed by Royal licence the additional surname of Montagu.

== Personal life ==
Lord Wharncliffe married Lady Susan Charlotte, daughter of Henry Lascelles, 3rd Earl of Harewood, in 1855. They had no children.

Lord Wharncliffe died in May 1899, aged 71, and was succeeded (in the viscountcy and earldom according to the special remainder) by his nephew Francis. The Countess of Wharncliffe died in May 1927.

== Notes ==
Peerage of the United Kingdom
New creation	Earl of Wharncliffe; 1876–1899	Succeeded by Francis Montagu-Stuart-Wortley-Mackenzie
Preceded by John Stuart-Wortley	Baron Wharncliffe; 1855–1899	Succeeded by Francis Montagu-Stuart-Wortley-Mackenzie
