= Gerrit Mannoury =

Dutch philosopher (1867–1956)

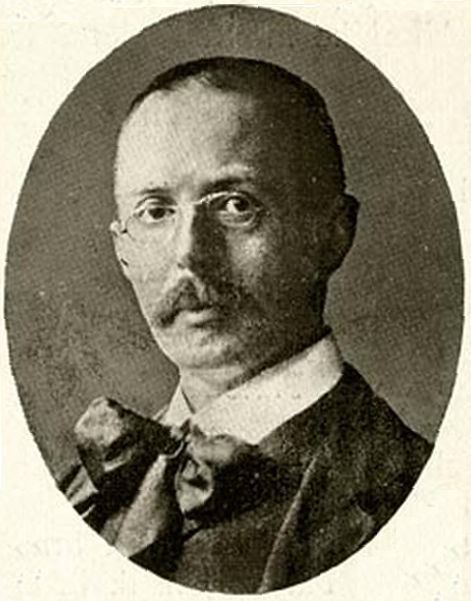
Gerrit Mannoury, 1917

Gerrit Mannoury (17 May 1867 – 30 January 1956) was a Dutch philosopher and mathematician, professor at the University of Amsterdam and communist, known as the central figure in the signific circle, a Dutch counterpart of the Vienna circle.

== Biography ==
Gerrit Mannoury was born on 17 May 1867 in Wormerveer. On 8 August 1907 he married Elizabeth Maria Berkelbach van der Sprenkel, with whom he had three daughters and a son, Jan Mannoury. His father Gerrit Mannoury, a sea-captain, had died in China when he was three years old. He attended the Hogere Burgerschool (HBS) in Amsterdam, where he graduated in 1885. The same year he received a Teacher's Degree in Accounting and in Mechanics. In 1902 he also received a Teacher's Degree in Mathematics. Mannoury was a self-educated mathematician. Because he was a teacher he couldn't attend lessons at the University of Amsterdam. He did receive private lessons from Diederik Korteweg. He was awarded a PhD in Mathematics late in life, in 1946, with L. E. J. Brouwer as his promotores.

Mannoury was a committed socialist throughout his life. In 1901 he helped to found the scientific bureau of the Social Democratic Workers' Party (SDAP), of which he was secretary until 1906. In 1909 Mannoury left the SDAP with Orthodox Marxist opposition, and took a seat on the party board of the newly founded Social Democratic Party (SDP). After the Russian October Revolution, the SDP renamed itself in 1918 to the Communist Party of Holland (CPH) (later the Communist Party of the Netherlands).

Mannoury started working in primary education in Amsterdam, Bloemendaal and Helmond. In 1910 he started teaching at the Hoogere Burger School (HBS) at Vlissingen. In 1902 he had been appointed privaatdocent at the University of Amsterdam and in 1917 he was made professor there. In 1932 Mannoury was disbarred from the Communist Party for supporting the exiled Leon Trotsky. Following this event, Mannoury's political activity was mostly centered for the abolition of the death penalty.

He retired in 1937. He lectured on the philosophy of mathematics, and on mechanics, analytics and descriptive and projective geometry.

Mannoury was, with Diederik Korteweg, one of the most important teachers of Luitzen Egbertus Jan Brouwer at Amsterdam University, Mannoury especially philosophically. The first appearance of the names "formalism" and "intuitionism" in Brouwer's writings, were in a review of Gerrit Mannoury's book Methodologisches und Philosophisches zur Elementar-Mathematik (Methodological and philosophical remarks on elementary mathematics) from 1909. Two other Dutch scientists he inspired were philosopher and logician Evert W. Beth and psychologist Adriaan de Groot.

He died in Amsterdam in 1956.

== Work ==
Mannoury's main inspirations were G. W. F. Hegel, G.J.P.J. Bolland and F. H. Bradley. He was also inspired by the work of Friedrich Nietzsche, Baruch Spinoza, the French mathematician philosopher of science Henri Poincaré and the English positivism of Bertrand Russell. Mannoury combined a logical-mathematical way of thinking with a deep insight into the human soul.

== Publications ==
Mannoury was a prolific and polymathic writer who published books, articles, reviews, and pamphlets.

- 1903. Over de beteekenis der wiskundige logica voor de philosophie
- 1907. Het Boeddhisme: Overzicht van leer en geschiedenis
- 1909. Methodologisches und Philosophisches zur Elementar-Mathematik
- 1910. Methodologiese aantekeningen over het dubbel-boekhouden
- 1917. Over de betekenis van de wiskundige denkvorm, Inaugural lecture held at the University of Amsterdam, 8 Oct 1917.
- 1919. Wiskunst, filosofie en socialisme: overdrukken
- 1925. Mathesis en mystiek: Een signifiese studie van kommunisties standpunt
- 1927. Willen en weten: overdrukken
- 1930. Heden is het keerpunt: een onuitgesproken verdedigingsrede
- 1931. Woord en gedachte: een inleiding tot de signifika, inzonderheid met het oog op het onderwĳs in de wiskunde
- 1938. Zur Enzyklopädie der Einheitswissenschaft. Vorträge, with Otto Neurath, E. Brunswik, C. Hull, and J. Woodger.
- 1946. Relativisme en dialektiek: schema ener filosofisch-sociologische grondslagenleer
- 1947. Les fondements psycho-linguistiques des mathématiques
- 1947. Handboek der analytische significa, deel I: Geschiedenis der begripskritiek
- 1948. Handboek der analytische significa, deel II: Hoofdbegrippen en methoden der significa: Ontogenese en fylogenese van het verstandshoudingsapparaat
- 1948. De dood als zegepraal : opstellen over de massa-edukatieve zĳde van het doodstrafprobleem
- 1949. Signifika: een inleiding
- 1953, Polairpsychologische begripssynthese
