= Victoria, Lady Welby =

British philosophical writer (1837–1912)

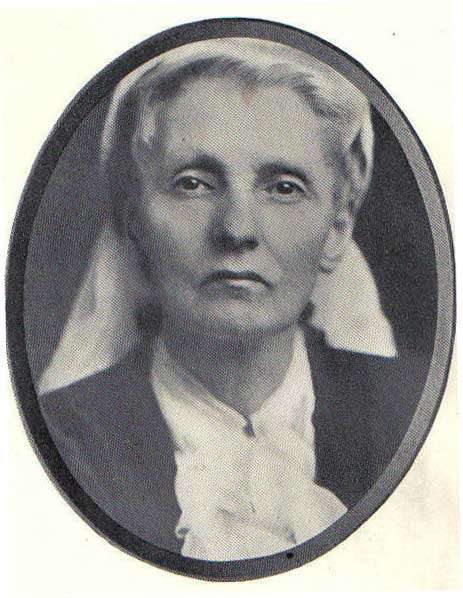
- Photograph by G.C. Beresford
- Born: 27 April 1837; London, England
- Died: 29 March 1912 (aged 74); London Borough of Harrow, England
- Spouse: William Earle Welby-Gregory (m. 1863; died 1898)
- Children: 3, including Nina
- Parents: Charles Stuart-Wortley-Mackenzie (father); Lady Emmeline Stuart-Wortley (mother)

Philosophical work
- Era: 19th-century philosophy
- Region: Western philosophy
- School: British pragmatism
- Main interests: Philosophy of language, logic
- Notable ideas: Significs

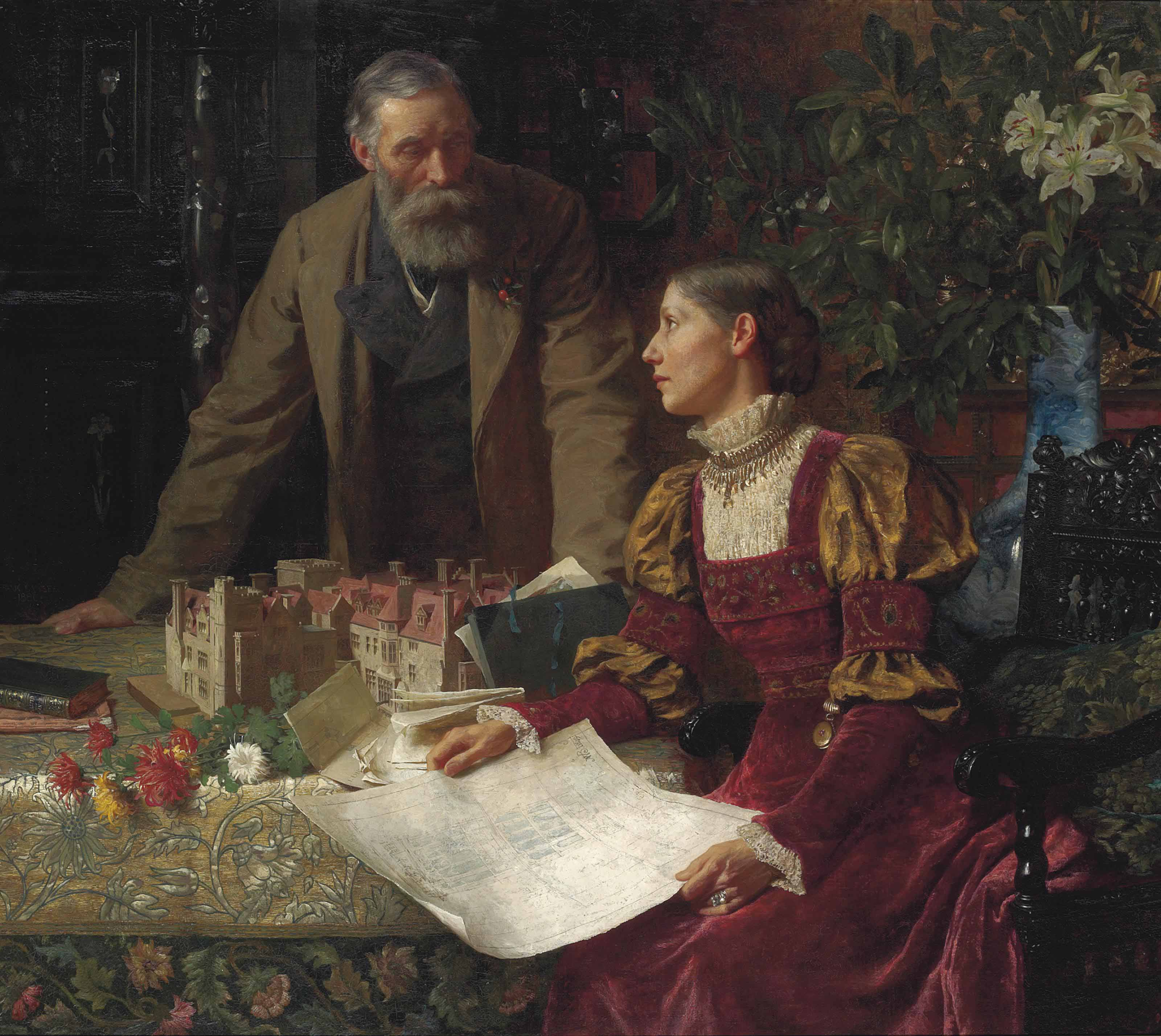
The House Builders (Portraits of Sir W.E. & The Hon. Lady Welby-Gregory). Painting (1880) by Frank Dicksee

Victoria, Lady Welby (27 April 1837 – 29 March 1912), more correctly Lady Welby-Gregory, was a self-educated British philosopher of language, musician and watercolourist.

== Early life ==
Welby was born to the Hon. Charles Stuart-Wortley-Mackenzie and Lady Emmeline Stuart-Wortley, and christened Victoria Alexandrina Maria Louisa Stuart-Wortley. Following the death of her father in 1844, she travelled widely with her mother, and recorded her travel experiences in her diary. When her mother died on their travels in Syria in 1855, she returned to England to stay with her grandfather, John Manners, the 5th Duke of Rutland, at Belvoir Castle. In 1858 she moved to Frogmore to live with a friend of her mother's – the Duchess of Kent, Princess Victoria of Saxe-Coburg-Saalfeld, Queen Victoria's mother. On the death of the duchess she was appointed a maid of honour to her godmother, the Queen herself.

In 1863 she married Sir William Earle Welby-Gregory, 4th baronet (1829–1898), who was active in British politics. She and Sir William lived together at Denton Manor in Lincolnshire. They had three children, including a daughter, Nina, who married Edwardian rake and publisher Harry Cust.

== Academic career ==
Once her children were grown and had moved out of the house, Welby, who had had little formal education, began a fairly intense process of self-education. This included mixing, corresponding, and conversing with some of the leading British thinkers of her day, some of whom she invited to the Manor. It was not unusual for Victorian Englishmen of means to become thinkers and writers (e.g. Darwin, Lord Acton, J. S. Mill, Charles Babbage). Welby is one of the few women of her place and time to do the same.

Her early publications were on Christian theology, and particularly addressed the interpretation of the Christian scriptures. The first, Links and Clues, was published in 1881, but like several that followed was little read and noticed. The process of wondering why this was so led Welby to become interested in language, rhetoric, persuasion, and philosophy. By the late 19th century, she was publishing articles in the leading English language academic journals of the day, such as Mind and The Monist. She published her first philosophical book, What Is Meaning? Studies in the Development of Significance in 1903, following it with Significs and Language: The Articulate Form of Our Expressive and Interpretive Resources, in 1911. That same year, "Significs", the name she gave to her theory of meaning, was the title of a long article she contributed to the Encyclopædia Britannica. Her writings on the reality of time culminated in her article Time As Derivative (1907).

What Is Meaning? was sympathetically reviewed for The Nation by the founder of American pragmatism, Charles Sanders Peirce, which led to an eight-year correspondence between them, one that has been published three times, most recently as Hardwick (2001). Welby and Peirce were both academic outsiders, and their approaches to language and meaning had some things in common. But most of the correspondence consists of Peirce elaborating his related theory of semiotics. Welby's replies did not conceal that she found Peirce hard to follow, but by circulating copies of some of Peirce's letters to her, she did much to introduce Peirce to British thinkers. Contemporary Peircians have since returned the favour by being sympathetic students of Welby's ideas.

C. K. Ogden began corresponding with Welby in 1910, and his subsequent writings were very much influenced by her theories, although he tried to minimise this fact in his best-known book, The Meaning of Meaning (1923). She also corresponded with William James, F. C. S. Schiller, Mary Everest Boole, the Italian pragmatists Giovanni Vailati and Mario Calderoni, F.H. Bradley, Bertrand Russell, J. Cook Wilson and Henri Bergson.

Welby's varied activities included founding the Sociological Society of Great Britain and the Decorative Needlework Society, and writing poetry and plays.

== Significs ==
"...every one of us is in one sense a born explorer: our only choice is what world we will explore, our only doubt whether our exploration will be worth the trouble. [...] And the idlest of us wonders: the stupidest of us stares: the most ignorant of us feels curiosity: while the thief actively explores his neighbour's pocket or breaks into the "world" of his neighbour's house and plate-closet". ("Sense, meaning, and interpretation (I)" Mind N.S. V; 1898)

Welby's concern with the problem of meaning included (perhaps especially) the everyday use of language, and she coined the word significs for her approach (replacing her first choice of "sensifics"). She preferred "significs" to semiotics and semantics, because the latter were theory-laden, and because "significs" pointed to her specific area of interest, which other approaches to language had tended to ignore.

She distinguished between different kinds of sense, and developed the various relations between them and ethical, aesthetic, pragmatic, and social values. She posited three main kinds of sense: sense, meaning, and significance. In turn, these corresponded to three levels of consciousness, which she called "planetary", "solar", and "cosmic", and explained in terms of a sort of Darwinian theory of evolution. The triadic structure of her thinking was a feature she shared with Peirce.

Welby's theories on signification in general were one of a number of approaches to the theory of language that emerged in the late 19th century and anticipated contemporary semantics, semiotics, and semiology. Welby had a direct effect on the Significs group, most of whose members were Dutch, including Gerrit Mannoury and Frederik van Eeden. Hence she indirectly influenced L. E. J. Brouwer, the founder of intuitionistic logic.

== Legacy ==
Following her death in 1912, Sir Charles Welby presented her collection of books to the University of London Library.

In March 2023, she was one of a number of notable women with a connection to Grantham honoured by South Kesteven District Council.

== Bibliography ==
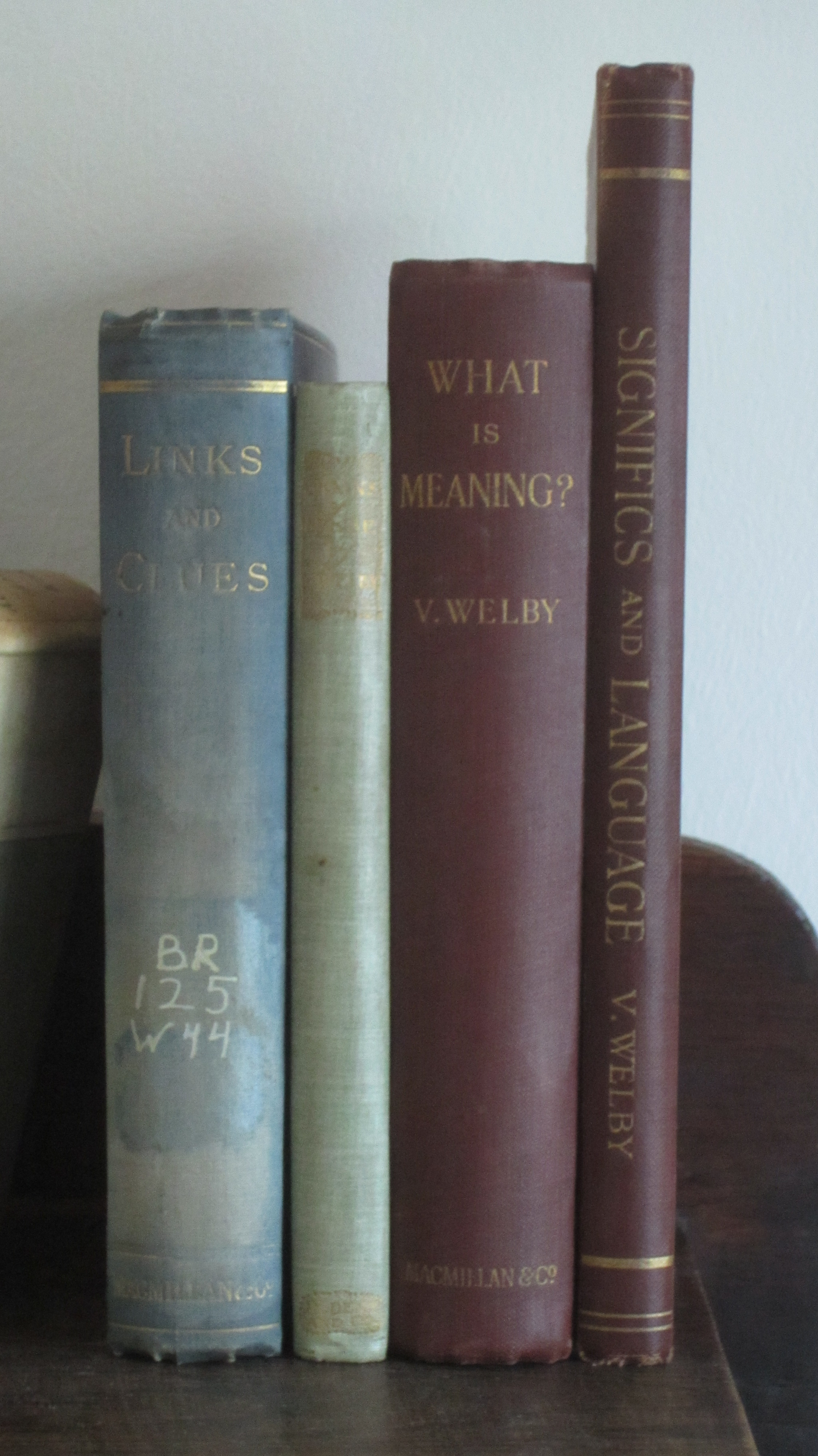
First editions of works by Victoria Welby

- 1852 A Young Traveller's Journal of a Tour in North and South America During the Year 1850 T. Bosworth.
- 1881. Links and Clues (under the pen name 'Vita'). Macmillan & Co. Second [altered] edition (under the name 'Hon. Lady Welby-Gregory') 1883.
- 1893. "Meaning and metaphor," Monist 3: 510–525. Reprinted in Welby (1985).
- 1896. "Sense, meaning, and interpretation I" Mind 5: 24–37. Reprinted in Welby (1985). Extract in M. Warnock, ed., 1996. Women Philosophers. London: Everyman. ISBN 0-460-87721-6.
- 1896. "Sense, meaning, and interpretation II" Mind 5: 186–202. Reprinted in Welby (1985).
- 1897. Grains of Sense. J. M. Dent & Co.
- 1901, "Notes on the 'Welby Prize Essay," Mind 10: 188–209.
- 1903. What Is Meaning? Studies in the Development of Significance. London: Macmillan & Co.
- 1909. "Mr. McTaggart on the "Unreality of Time"" Mind 18: 326-9.
- 1911. Significs and Language. The Articulate Form of Our Expressive and Interpretative Resources. London: Macmillan & Co.
- 1929. Echoes of Larger Life. A Selection from the Early Correspondence of Victoria Lady Welby. Edited by her daughter Mrs. Henry Cust. London: Jonathan Cape.
- 1931. Other Dimensions. A Selection from the Later Correspondence of Victoria Lady Welby. Edited by her daughter Mrs. Henry Cust. With an Introduction by L. P. Jacks, M.A., D.D., LL.D., D.Litt. London: Jonathan Cape.
- 1983 (1903). What Is Meaning? Studies in the Development of Significance. Reprint of the edition London, 1903, with an Introductory essay by Gerrit Mannoury and a Preface by Achim Eschbach. Foundations of Semiotics, Volume 2. John Benjamins Publishing Company.
- 1985 (1911). Significs and Language. The Articulate Form of Our Expressive and Interpretative Resources. Reprint of the edition London, 1911, and of two articles by V. Welby. Edited and introduced by H. Walter Schmitz. Foundations of Semiotics, Volume 5. John Benjamins Publishing Company.
- 2001 (1977). Semiotic and Significs: Correspondence between Charles S. Peirce and Victoria Lady Welby. Edited by Charles S. Hardwick, with the assistance of James Cook. Texas Tech University Press.

Lectures

- "An address delivered by the Hon. Mrs. Welby to the married women of Newton on the first Thursday in Lent, 1872"
