= James Stuart-Wortley, 1st Baron Wharncliffe =

British soldier and politician

The Right Honourable The Lord Wharncliffe PC
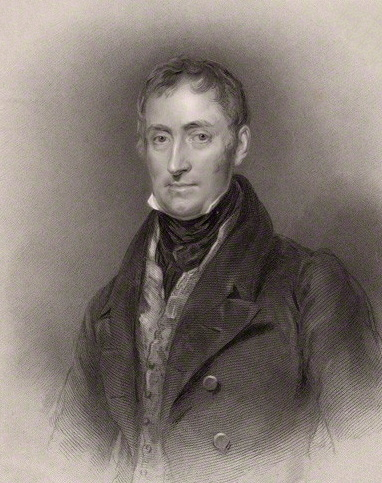

Lord Privy Seal
- In office 15 December 1834 – 8 April 1835
- Monarch: William IV
- Prime Minister: Sir Robert Peel, Bt
- Preceded by: The Earl of Mulgrave
- Succeeded by: Viscount Dungannon

Lord President of the Council
- In office 3 September 1841 – 19 December 1845
- Monarch: Victoria
- Prime Minister: Sir Robert Peel, Bt
- Preceded by: The Marquess of Lansdowne
- Succeeded by: The Duke of Buccleuch

Personal details
- Born: 6 October 1776
- Died: 19 December 1845 (aged 69)
- Party: Tory
- Spouse: Lady Elizabeth Crichton (1779–1856)
- Children: 5, including John, Charles, and James
- Parent(s): James Stuart-Wortley-Mackenzie; Margaret Cunynghame

Colonel James Archibald Stuart-Wortley-Mackenzie, 1st Baron Wharncliffe, PC (6 October 1776 – 19 December 1845), was a British soldier and politician. A grandson of Prime Minister the 3rd Earl of Bute, he held office under Sir Robert Peel as Lord Privy Seal between 1834 and 1835 and as Lord President of the Council between 1841 and 1845.

== Background and education ==
Stuart-Wortley was the son of Colonel James Stuart-Wortley-Mackenzie, son of John Stuart, 3rd Earl of Bute, and his wife Mary Wortley-Montagu, Baroness Mountstuart in her own right, daughter of Edward Wortley Montagu and Lady Mary Pierrepont. His father had assumed the additional surname of Wortley as heir to his mother, taking later also that of Mackenzie (which his son in later life discarded) as heir to his great-uncle James Stuart-Mackenzie of Rosehaugh. Stuart-Wortley's mother was Margaret, daughter of Lieutenant-General Sir David Cunynghame, 3rd Baronet. He was educated at Charterhouse School.

== Military career ==
Stuart-Wortley was commissioned into the 48th Foot in 1790, transferred to the 7th Foot in 1791, and purchased a captaincy in the 72nd Foot in 1793. He was promoted lieutenant-colonel in 1797 and became colonel of the 12th Foot six months later. In 1797 he transferred to the Grenadier Guards, but resigned his commission in 1801.

== Political career ==
Stuart-Wortley sat as Tory Member of Parliament for the rotten borough of Bossiney in Cornwall between 1802 and 1818, when he was returned for Yorkshire.

His attitude on various questions became gradually more liberal, and his support of Catholic Emancipation lost him his seat in 1826. He was then raised to the peerage as Baron Wharncliffe, of Wortley in the County of York, a recognition both of his previous parliamentary activity and of his high position among the country gentlemen.

In 1831, as political tempers ran high over the issue of Reform, Wharncliffe succeeded in opening channels of communication between the Government and the Opposition. Greville noted in his diary on 19 November 1831 that:

”Wharncliffe has neither wealth, influence, nor superior abilities, nor even popularity with his own party. He is a spirited, sensible, zealous, honorable, consistent country gentleman; their knowledge of his moderation and integrity induced Ministers to commit themselves to him, and he will thus be in all probability enabled to render an essential service to his country…”

He at first opposed the 1832 Reform Bill but, having come to see the undesirability of a popular conflict, separated himself from the Tories (with a number of colleagues, collectively known as "the Waverers") and took an important part in modifying the attitude of the peers and helping to pass the bill, though his attempts at amendment only resulted in his pleasing neither party. He became Lord Privy Seal in Sir Robert Peel's short 1834 to 1835 ministry, and again joined him in 1841 as Lord President of the Council, a post he held until 1845.

In 1834, he was sworn of the Privy Council.

In 1837 Lord Wharncliffe brought out an edition of the writings of his ancestress, Lady Mary Wortley Montagu.

The 1833 steam locomotive, Lord Wharncliffe, was named after him; it ran on the Dundee and Newtyle Railway, of which he was a director.

== Family ==
The future Lord Wharncliffe married Lady Elizabeth Caroline Mary Creighton (1779–1856), daughter of the 1st Earl Erne and his second wife Lady Mary Hervey, on 30 March 1799. They had five children:

- John Stuart-Wortley-Mackenzie, 2nd Baron Wharncliffe (1801–1855)
- Hon. Charles Stuart-Wortley-Mackenzie (1802–1844)
- Hon. Caroline Mary Stuart-Wortley (1803–1806)
- Hon. James Archibald Stuart-Wortley (1805–1881), Solicitor-General
- Hon. Caroline Jane Stuart-Wortley-Mackenzie (1809–12 June 1876), married on 30 August 1830 Hon. John Chetwynd-Talbot (1806–1852)

Lord Wharncliffe died in December 1845, aged 69, and was succeeded in the barony by his eldest son, John, whose son Edward, 3rd Baron Wharncliffe, was created Earl of Wharncliffe in 1876. Lady Wharncliffe died in April 1856.

Parliament of the United Kingdom
Preceded by Parliament of Great Britain	Member of Parliament for Bossiney; 1802–1818	Succeeded by Hon. John Ward; Sir Compton Pocklington Domvile
Preceded by Viscount Milton; Viscount Lascelles	Member of Parliament for Yorkshire; 1818–1826; With: Viscount Milton	Succeeded by Viscount Milton; Hon. William Duncombe; Richard Fountayne-Wilson; John Marshall
Political offices
Preceded by The Earl of Mulgrave	Lord Privy Seal; 1834–1835	Succeeded by Viscount Duncannon
Preceded by The Marquess of Lansdowne	Lord President of the Council; 1841–1845	Succeeded by The Duke of Buccleuch
Honorary titles
Preceded by The Earl of Harewood	Lord Lieutenant of the West Riding of Yorkshire; 1841–1845	Succeeded by The Earl of Harewood
Peerage of the United Kingdom
New creation	Baron Wharncliffe; 1826–1845	Succeeded by John Stuart-Wortley
