= Charles James Stuart-Wortley =

British politician (1802–1844)

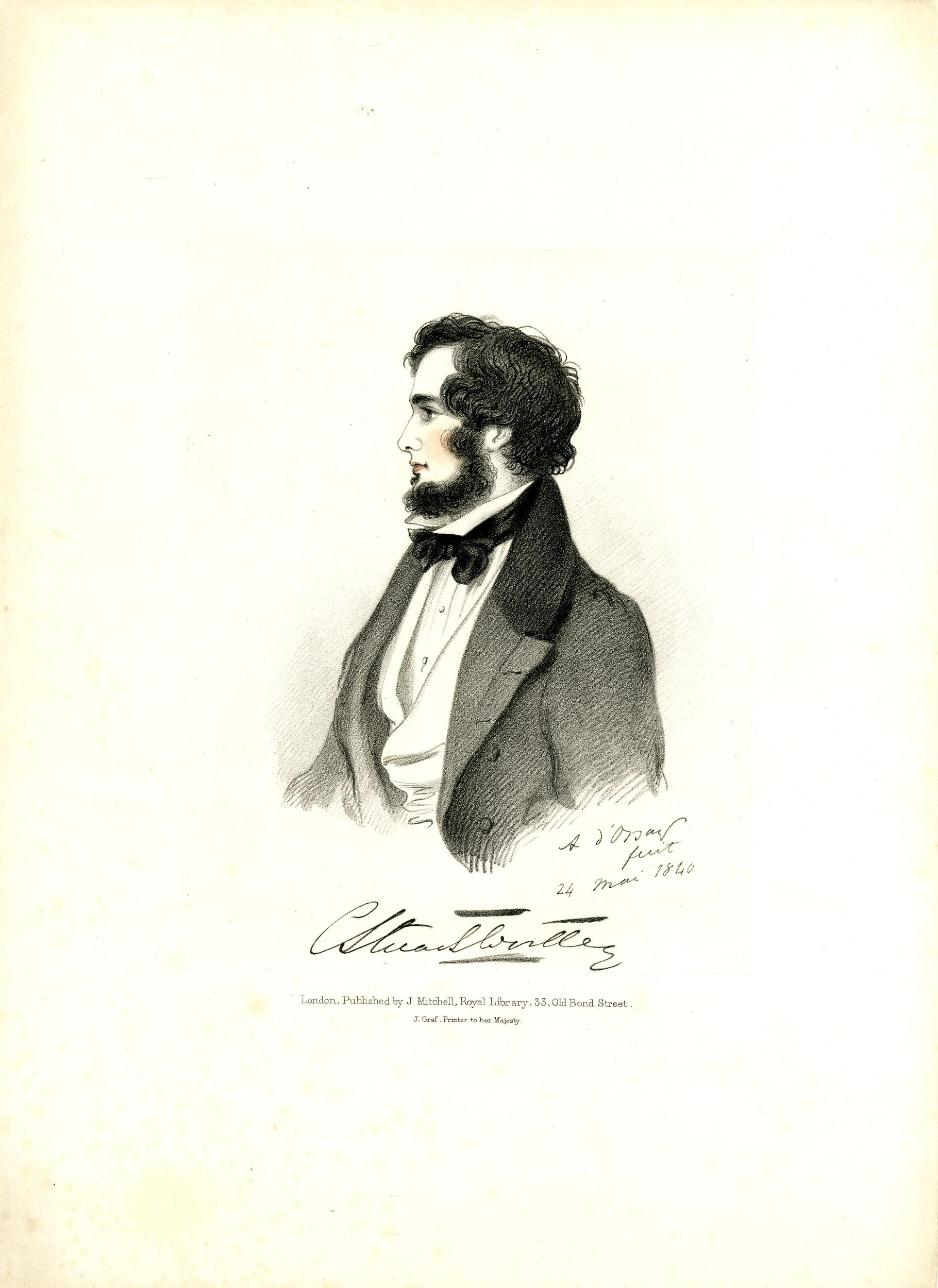
- Portrait by Alfred d'Orsay, 1840

Member of Parliament for Bossiney
- In office 1830–1832 Serving with Edward Rose Tunno
- Preceded by: John Stuart-Wortley-Mackenzie; Edward Rose Tunno
- Succeeded by: Constituency abolished

Personal details
- Born: 3 June 1802
- Died: 22 May 1844 (aged 41)
- Cause of death: Hunting accident
- Spouse: Lady Emmeline Manners (m. 1831)
- Children: 3
- Parent: James Stuart-Wortley-Mackenzie (father)
- Relatives: John Manners, 5th Duke of Rutland (father-in-law); Archibald Henry Plantagenet Stuart-Wortley (son); Victoria Alexandrina Stuart-Wortley (daughter); Sir William Earle Welby-Gregory (son-in-law)

Charles James Stuart-Wortley (3 June 1802 – 22 May 1844) was a British politician, the second son of James Stuart-Wortley-Mackenzie, 1st Baron Wharncliffe.

He was an observer at the French siege of Antwerp in 1832, and wrote an account of the affair.

On 17 February 1831 he married Lady Emmeline Manners (d. 1855), daughter of John Manners, 5th Duke of Rutland, by whom he had three children:

- Archibald Henry Plantagenet Stuart-Wortley (26 July 1832 – 30 April 1890), married on 15 June 1879 Lavinia Rebecca Gibbins (d. 1937)
- Adelbert William John Stuart-Wortley (d. 1847)
- Victoria Alexandrina Stuart-Wortley (d. 29 March 1912), married on 4 July 1863 Sir William Earle Welby-Gregory, 4th Baronet

He died in 1844 of the effects of a hunting accident suffered earlier in life.

Parliament of the United Kingdom
Preceded by John Stuart-Wortley-Mackenzie; Edward Rose Tunno	Member of Parliament for Bossiney; 1830–1832; With: Edward Rose Tunno	Constituency abolished
