= South Muskham =

Village and civil parish in Nottinghamshire, England

Coordinates: 53.1068°N 0.8203°W

- Village and civil parish
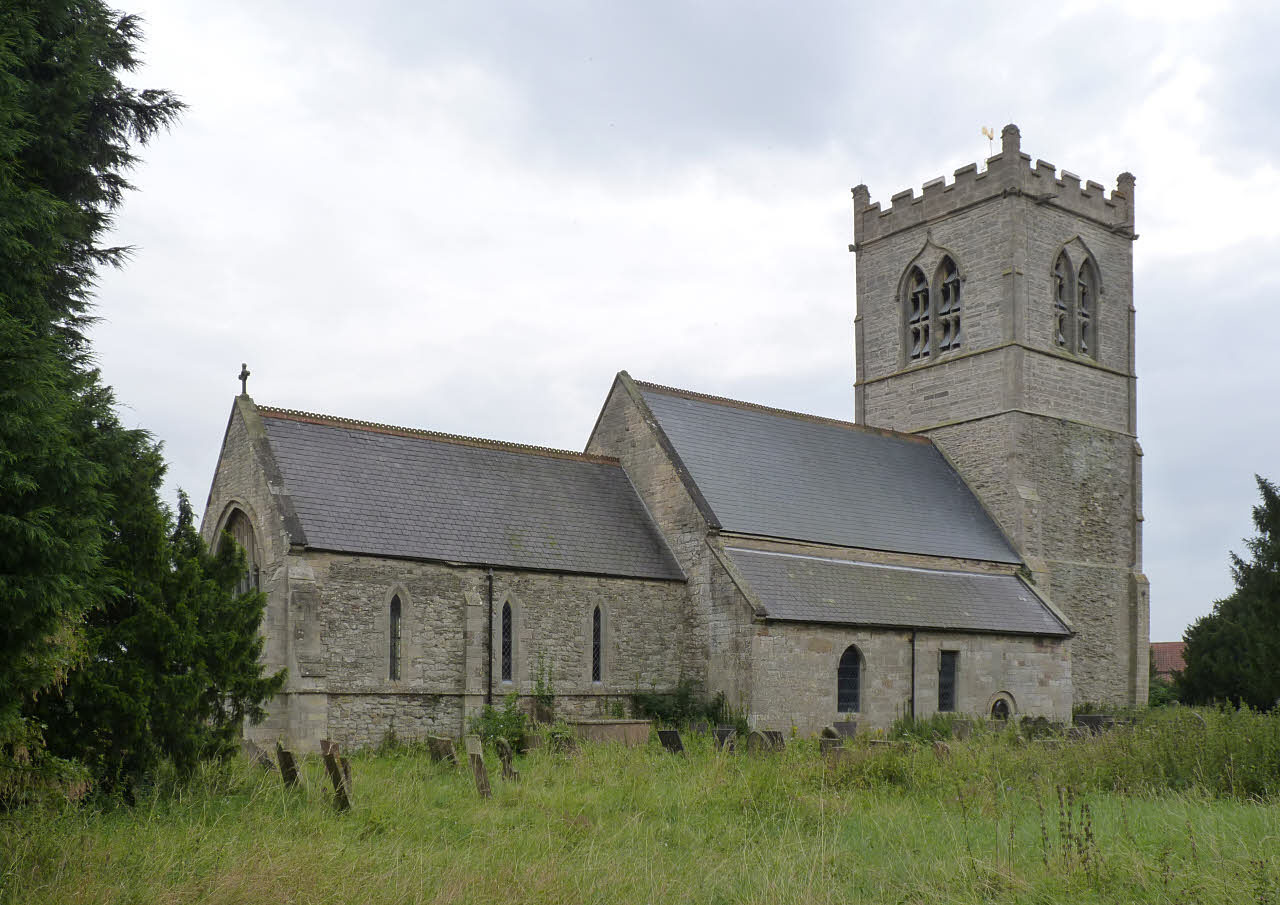
- St Wilfred’s Church

- Location within Nottinghamshire
- Interactive map of South Muskham
- Area: 4.39 sq mi (11.4 km^{2})
- Population: 469 (2021)
  - Density: 107/sq mi (41/km^{2})
- OS grid reference: SK 789572
  - London: 115 mi (185 km) SSE
- District: Newark and Sherwood
- Shire county: Nottinghamshire
- Region: East Midlands
- Country: England
- Sovereign state: United Kingdom
- Settlements: South Muskham; Little Carlton
- Post town: NEWARK
- Postcode district: NG23
- Dialling code: 01636
- Police: Nottinghamshire
- Fire: Nottinghamshire
- Ambulance: East Midlands
- UK Parliament: Newark
- Website: www.smlcpc.org

South Muskham is a village and civil parish in Nottinghamshire, England, close to the border with Lincolnshire. It is located west of the River Trent and the A1 road, 2 miles (3 km) north of Newark-upon-Trent. The parish includes the hamlet of Little Carlton. The population of the parish was 494 in the 2011 census, falling to 469 at the 2021 census.

The village lies on the historic route of the A1 Great North Road. When the Newark Bypass was built in 1964, the old Great North Road through the village became the A6065. In 1989 the road south of the village became part of the A616, and the road through the village became the B6325. South of the village the old Great North Road passes over a causeway built in 1770 by John Smeaton, and then crosses the River Trent at Muskham Bridge.

St Wilfrid's Church is a Grade I listed building. Parts of the church date back to the 13th century.

== See also ==
- Listed buildings in South Muskham
- North Muskham
