= Robert Sutton, 1st Baron Lexinton =

Robert Sutton, 1st Baron Lexinton (21 December 1594 – 13 October 1668) was a Royalist MP in 1625 and 1640.

== Biography ==
In 1624 he was elected Knight of the Shire (MP) for Nottinghamshire and re-elected in April and November 1640. He was disabled as a Royalist from sitting in 1643.

He served Charles I of England during the English Civil War, making great monetary sacrifices for the royal cause. He was commissioned as Colonel of a regiment of Nottinghamshire Trained Bands defending Newark-on-Trent. In 1645 the king created him Baron Lexinton, this being a variant of the name of the Nottinghamshire village of Laxton. His estate suffered during the time of the Commonwealth, but some money was returned to him by Charles II of England.

He commissioned the building of the first Kelham Hall. He died on 13 October 1668 at the age of 74. There is a wall monument to him in Church of St. Michael and All Angels, Averham.

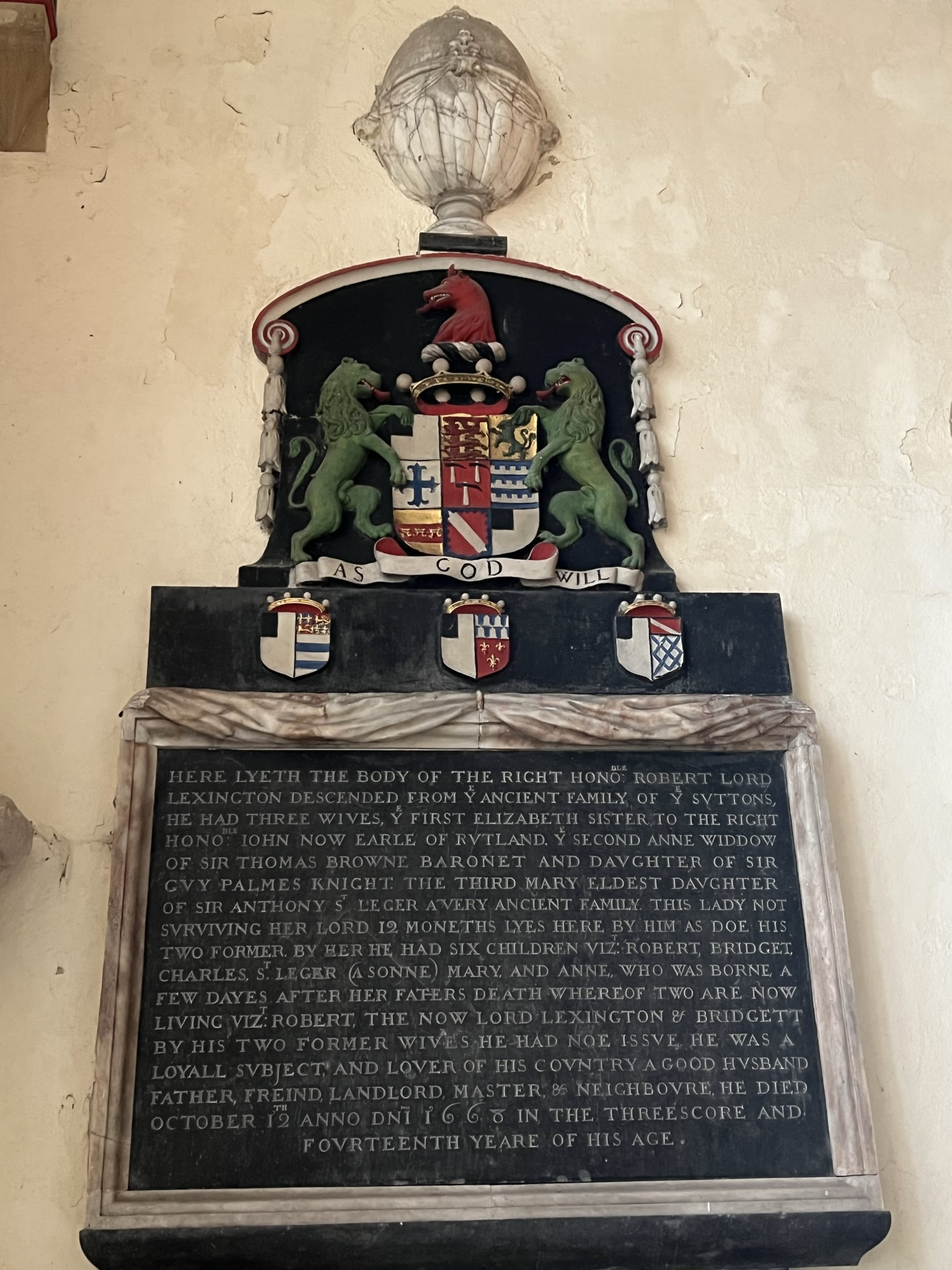
Wall monument to Robert Sutton, to the right of the altar in St. Michael and All Angels, Averham.

== Family ==
He was the son of Sir William Sutton of Averham, Nottinghamshire,

Lord Lexinton married three times.

- On 14 April 1616, he married Elizabeth Manners, the sister of John Manners, 8th Earl of Rutland, who died childless.
- His second wife was Anne Palmes, widow of Sir Thomas Browne, 2nd Baronet, who also died childless.
- On 21 February 1660, he married Mary St. Leger, by whom he had six children:
  - Robert, 2nd Baron Lexington (1662–1723)
  - Bridget
  - Charles
  - St. Leger (a son)
  - Mary
  - Anne (born a few days after her father's death)

In 1675, when she was aged only ten, Bridget Sutton was abducted and married by John Darcy, Lord Conyers. They later had five sons, including Robert Darcy, 3rd Earl of Holderness, and two daughters.

== Arms ==
Coat of arms of Robert Sutton, 1st Baron Lexinton
Crest A Wolf's Head erased proper Escutcheon Argent a Canton Sable Supporters On either side a Wolf proper

Peerage of England
New title	Baron Lexinton; 1645–1668	Succeeded by Robert Sutton
