= Listed buildings in South Muskham =

South Muskham is a civil parish in the Newark and Sherwood district of Nottinghamshire, England. The parish contains nine listed buildings that are recorded in the National Heritage List for England. Of these, one is listed at Grade I, the highest of the three grades, two are at Grade II*, the middle grade, and the others are at Grade II, the lowest grade. The parish contains the villages of South Muskham and Little Carlton, and the surrounding area. The listed buildings consist of a church and associated structures, farmhouses and farm buildings, cottages, two viaducts and a road bridge.

== Key ==
Grade	Criteria
I	Buildings of exceptional interest, sometimes considered to be internationally important
II*	Particularly important buildings of more than special interest
II	Buildings of national importance and special interest

== Buildings ==
Name and location	Photograph	Date	Notes	Grade
St Wilfrid's Church; 53.10719°N 0.81557°W		13th century	The church has been altered and extended through the centuries. It is built in stone with Welsh slate roofs, and consists of a nave, north and south aisles, a south porch, a chancel and a west tower. The tower has four stages, buttresses, a deep moulded plinth, three string courses, a coved eaves band with four gargoyles, an embattled parapet with four truncated pinnacles, and a weathercock. It contains lancet windows, on the west side is a clock face, and in the top stage are double bell openings with ogee hood moulds and finials, the one on the west with a statue in the spandrel.	I
The Gables; 53.10540°N 0.83762°W		Mid 13th century	The farmhouse originated as an aisled hall house, with cross-wings added in the mid-16th century, forming an H-shaped plan. It has a timber framed core with brick nogging, on plinths of brick and stone, it is partly rendered with remains of pargeting, and has tile hanging, and tile roofs with a single coped gable and kneelers. There are two storeys and a hall range of three bays, and projecting wings to the north with applied timber framing.	II*
Grange Farmhouse and farm buildings 53.10410°N 0.82328°W		17th century	The farm buildings have been extended. The earlier buildings are timber framed with rendered brick cladding, the later ones are in brick with dentilled eaves, and the roofs are pantiled with a single coped gable with kneelers. The buildings have one or two storeys, they form a U-shaped plan, and have fronts of two and three bays. Most of the windows are horizontally-sliding sashes. The buildings consist of a farmhouse with a service room, a stable with a granary above, and a pigsty.	II
Boundary wall, St Wilfrid's Church; 53.10758°N 0.81592°W		17th century	The churchyard boundary wall is in stone with stepped gabled coping and some flat coping. It contains two wooden gates and posts, two square stone gate piers with pyramidal caps, and two 19th-century octagonal cast iron gate posts with finials, and a pair of wrought iron gates. In the wall is an inscribed and dated stone tablet.	II
Manor Farm Cottages; 53.10697°N 0.84288°W	—	18th century	A house, later extended and subsequently divided. It is in brick with dentilled eaves and some cogged eaves, and a pantile roof with plain tile verges. There are two storeys and an L-shaped plan, with a front range of four bays. On the front is a porch and a doorway with a segmental head. The windows are a mix of casements, and sashes, most of these horizontally-sliding, some windows with segmental rubbed brick heads.	II
Viaduct 150 metres south of Muskham Bridge; 53.09539°N 0.82453°W		1770	The viaduct was designed by John Smeaton to carry the Great North Road. It is in red brick and consists of 18 round arches with buttresses between. The brick parapets have stone coping, and scrolled and ramped ends with round brick piers.	II
Viaduct 300 metres south of Muskham Bridge; 53.09469°N 0.82404°W		1770	The viaduct was designed by John Smeaton to carry the Great North Road. It is in red brick and consists of seven round arches with buttresses between. The brick parapets have stone coping, and scrolled and ramped ends with round brick piers.	II
Lamp post, St Wilfrid's Church; 53.10715°N 0.81596°W	—	c. 1870	The lamp post in the churchyard is in cast iron. It has a tapered round shaft, with bands of Romanesque decoration and a foliate capital. The ladder rests have foliate ends, and there is a square tapered oil lamp.	II
Winthorpe Bridge; 53.10167°N 0.79874°W		1964	The bridge carries the A1 road over the River Trent, and was built by Christiani & Nielsen. It is in concrete, and consists of three spans with reinforced concrete piers and abutments, and has nine box girders.	II*
