= Listed buildings in Kelham =

Kelham is a civil parish in the Newark and Sherwood district of Nottinghamshire, England. The parish contains 18 listed buildings that are recorded in the National Heritage List for England. Of these, two are listed at Grade I, the highest of the three grades, one is at Grade II*, the middle grade, and the others are at Grade II, the lowest grade. The parish contains the village of Kelham and the surrounding countryside. The most important buildings in the parish are St Wilfrid's Church and Kelham Hall, which are both listed at Grade I. Most of the other listed buildings are in the village and include structures associated with Kelham Hall, houses, farmhouses and associated structures, and outside the village are a causeway and a viaduct on the Great North Road.

== Key ==
Grade	Criteria
I	Buildings of exceptional interest, sometimes considered to be internationally important
II*	Particularly important buildings of more than special interest
II	Buildings of national importance and special interest

== Buildings ==
Name and location	Photograph	Date	Notes	Grade
St Wilfrid's Church; 53.09016°N 0.84609°W		14th century	The church has been altered and extended through the centuries, and was restored in 1874 by C. Hodgson Fowler. It is built in stone, with embattled parapets and slate roofs. The church consists of a nave with a clerestory, north and south aisles, north and south porches, a chancel, a south chapel and a west tower. The tower has four sages, a moulded plinth, buttresses, three string courses, a moulded eaves band, four gargoyles, an embattled parapet, and four crocketed pinnacles. In the northeast corner is an octagonal stair turret.	I
4, 6 and 8 Blacksmith Lane; 53.09349°N 0.84405°W	—	17th century	A range of three houses, Nos. 4 and 6 being the earlier, and No. 8 added in the 18th century. The earlier houses have a timber framed core with brick nogging, encased in brick and partly rendered with a roof of tile and pantile. There are two storeys and an L-shaped plan, with a front of three bays. No. 8, to the north, has a floor band, partly dentilled eaves, and coped gables with kneelers. Most of the windows in all the houses are casements.	II
Blacksmith Cottage; 53.09311°N 0.84425°W		17th century	The house has a timber framed core with brick nogging, it is encased in brick and rendered, and has a pantile roof. There are two storeys and three bays, a continuous rear outshut, and to the left is a single-storey single-bay extension with rebated eaves and coped gables with kneelers. The windows are a mix of casements, and horizontally-sliding sashes.	II
6 Main Street; 53.09327°N 0.84594°W	—	Mid 18th century	The house is in brick with a floor band, an eaves band, and a pantile roof with brick coped gables and kneelers. There are two storeys and attics, a main range of four bays, and a single-storey single-bay extension on the left. The windows are casements, and some of the openings have segmental heads. At the rear is a stair turret with a hipped roof, a flat-roofed extension, and a single-storey outbuilding with an L-shaped plan.	II
Stable, 6 Main Street; 53.09340°N 0.84613°W	—	Mid 18th century	The stable is in red brick with rebated eaves and a pyramidal pantile roof. There are two storeys, a square plan, and a single bay. On the south front is a doorway and a window, each with a segmental head, and on the east front are slit vents.	II
Causeway arches 53.09146°N 0.82184°W	—	1770	The causeway, designed by John Smeaton, carries the Great North Road over part of the flood plain of the River Trent. It consists of 13 arches with intermediate pilasters, in brick with stone dressings. The parapet walls are coped, and have ramped curved ends with round piers.	II
Viaduct; 53.09340°N 0.82316°W		1770	The viaduct was designed by John Smeaton to carry the Great North Road over part of the flood plain of the River Trent. It consists of nine round arches in red brick with buttresses between. The parapets have stone coping, and the ends are scrolled and ramped with round brick piers.	II
Farm Buildings, Home Farm; 53.09299°N 0.84700°W		Late 18th century	The farm buildings were remodelled in the late 1850s by George Gilbert Scott, and have since been converted for residential use. They are in brick with blue brick diapering, dentilled eaves, and tile roofs with coped gables and kneelers. There are in one and two storeys, and have an H-shaped plan, with a main range of eleven bays. In the main range is a carriage entrance, over which is a shingled gable. To its right is a square tower with three stages, the bottom stage containing openings with segmental heads. In the middle stage is a mullioned casement window, over which are dentilled eaves, and the top stage is timber framed, containing an octagonal panel with a gabled hood, and this is surmounted by a pyramidal roof with a wind vane. Elsewhere, there are casement windows and gabled dormers.	II
Manor Farm House; 53.09370°N 0.84567°W	—	Late 18th century	The farmhouse is in red brick, with a floor band, dentilled and rebated eaves, and a pantile roof with coped gables and kneelers. There are two storeys and attics, and an L-shaped plan, with a main range of four bays, the left bay projecting, and later additions to the west. The doorway has a fanlight, the windows are sashes, and all the openings have segmental heads.	II
Kelham Hall; 53.09131°N 0.84520°W		1844–46	The oldest surviving part of the country house is the service wing by Anthony Salvin, the rest of the house was built in 1859–61 and designed by George Gilbert Scott. It is in red Retford brick and Ancaster stone, with stone dressings and slate roofs. There are three storeys and attics, and all the fronts are asymmetrical, with sides of nine and three bays. Most of the windows are lancets or mullioned and transomed casements, and there are three towers.	I
Gazebo and garden wall, Kelham Hall; 53.09150°N 0.84396°W		c. 1844–46	The gazebo is in brick, with stone dressings, a string course, moulded and dentilled eaves, and a lead octagonal dome with a finial and a wind vane. There is an octagonal plan, a single storey, and a single bay. On the front is a three-bay round-arched arcade with keystones, two marble columns at the front, and two granite columns at the rear. Above it is a shaped moulded balustrade with round-headed coped panels, finials, and a pierced obelisk finial on a stem. The adjoining wall is in brick with a moulded stone plinth and ramped stone coping. It contains a pair of cruciate gate piers with stepped Renaissance Revival finials.	II*
Garden boundary wall, Kelham Hall; 53.09095°N 0.84405°W	—	Mid 19th century	The garden wall on the river front extends for about 200 metres (660 ft). It is in brick with a moulded plinth and coping. The wall has tapering external buttresses, and square intermediate piers, and is pierced with decorative openings.	II
Railing piers, Kelham Hall; 53.09265°N 0.84482°W	—	Mid 19th century	Along the north boundary wall of the hall grounds is a foundation wall, on which are 36 square brick piers. These have blue brick bands and chequerwork, cogged eaves, and a moulded brick cornice. Between the piers is timber paling.	II
Garden urns, Kelham Hall; 53.09120°N 0.84495°W		Mid 19th century	The seven garden urns run along the east front of the hall, and each has a cruciform moulded stone plinth. On this is a foliate terracotta base, and an urn with a cruciform foot, a cabled stem, and a cusped tulip-shaped bowl with foliate decoration.	II
Kelham Bridge; 53.09249°N 0.84260°W		1857	The bridge carries the A617 road over the River Trent. It is in brick with stone dressings, and consists of five segmental arches of differing sizes, on four canted piers. The bridge has chamfered stone soffits and hood moulds, a chamfered string course, corbelled pedestrian refuges, and plain stone coping.	II
Lodge and gateway, Kelham Hall; 53.09290°N 0.84580°W		c. 1858	The lodge is in red brick on a chamfered plinth, with dressings in blue brick and stone, diapering, chamfered eaves, and slate roofs, partly hipped, and partly gabled with moulded copings. There is a single storey and attics, and an L-shaped plan, with a main range of two bays. On the west front is a projecting doorway with a rebated pointed arched head and octagonal responds with moulded bases and capitals. The north front has a square bay window, and most of the windows are casements. To the west of the lodge are walls with moulded stone and ramped brick coping, containing a pair of rectangular gate piers with moulded corners, blue brick bands and crocketed stone caps. Between the piers is a pair of timber gates with iron cresting, and there is a wicket gate to the left.	II
Railing and gate, 6 Main Street; 53.09317°N 0.84578°W	—	Late 19th century	The pairs of octagonal cast iron gate piers have moulded caps. They contain single and double gates in wrought iron, and the boundary hairpin railings extend for about 75 metres (246 ft).	II
Former Monastic buildings, Kelham Hall; 53.09172°N 0.84598°W		1927–29	The monastic buildings form three ranges around a quadrangle, completed by a chapel to the north, and have since been converted for other uses. They are in brick and concrete, with tile roofs. The south range has two storeys and seven bays, and the main west range has three storeys and attics, with ten bays, and contains a round-arched entrance. Most of the windows are cross-casements, and there are dormers. The central space of the chapel has a high brick-lined dome, and most of its openings have round-arched heads.	II
