= Staythorpe =

Coordinates: 53.076896°N 0.875851°W

- Civil parish
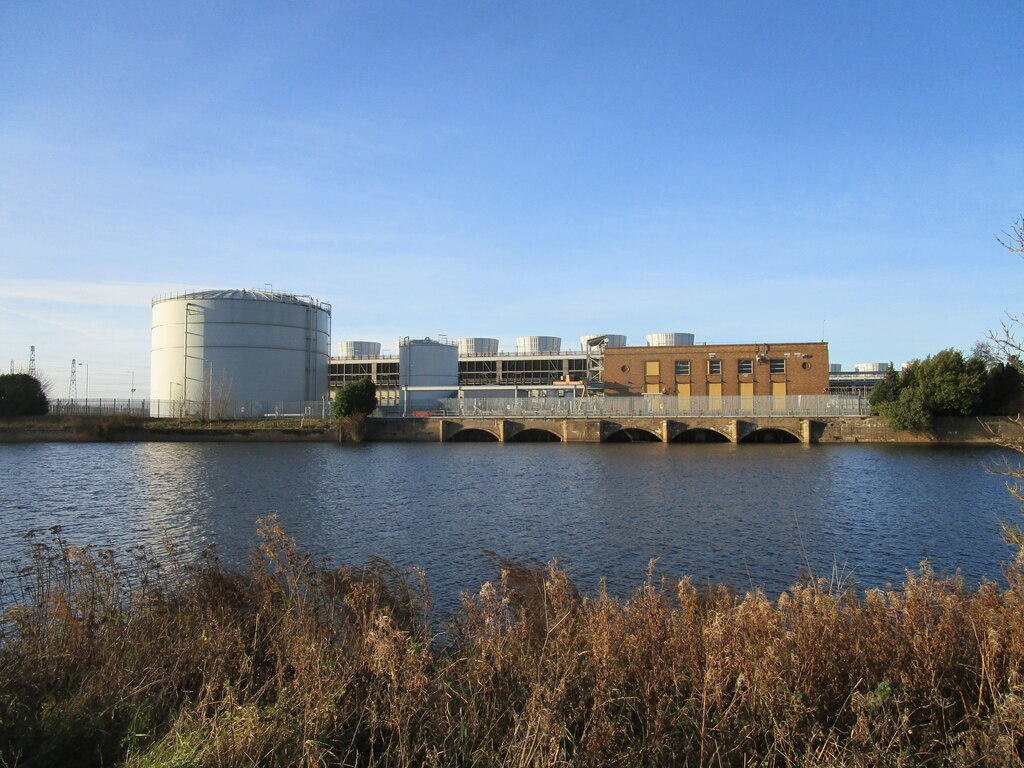
- Staythorpe Power Station

- Location within Nottinghamshire
- Interactive map of Staythorpe
- Area: 2.67 km^{2} (1.03 sq mi)
- Population: 93
  - Density: 35/km^{2} (91/sq mi)
- OS grid reference: SK 75351 53961
- District: Newark and Sherwood
- Shire county: Nottinghamshire
- Region: East Midlands
- Country: England
- Sovereign state: United Kingdom
- Post town: NEWARK
- Postcode district: NG23
- Dialling code: 01636
- Police: Nottinghamshire
- Fire: Nottinghamshire
- Ambulance: East Midlands
- UK Parliament: Newark and Sherwood
- Website: www.akspc.org.uk

Staythorpe is a hamlet and civil parish in the Newark and Sherwood district of Nottinghamshire, England. During the 2021 census, the population was recorded as 93 residents.

== History ==
=== Toponymy ===
Staythorpe was listed in the Domesday Book in 1086; it was then called Startorp, meaning 'Stari 's village'.

=== Developments ===
There is evidence of human activity from the Late Mesolithic/Early Neolithic period, with sherds of pottery recovered from ditch fills, as well as worked flint fragments. From the Bronze Age finds include worked animal bone, while larger artefacts from a pot were also discovered dating from the Roman era. Staythorpe recorded twelve villagers at the time of the Domesday Survey, the land was owned by Swein at the time of the Norman Conquest, but by Domesday was held by Gilbert Tison.

The core settlement was for centuries based around Pingley Lane, which branched off the Nottingham-Newark route. In medieval times it belonged to the monastery of Newstead but, when King Henry VIII renounced the Catholic Church and dissolved the monasteries, he gave the land to Trinity College, Cambridge. For centuries it was a township in Averham parish.

The bridge over Pingley Dyke exists from medieval times, being built up over some centuries. It's thought the current bridge was built over a single arch brick-built structure with the earliest parts not dating before c.1780, with rebuilds and extensions in c.1800, the late 19th century and the 1960s-70s. A new road alignment immediately east of the bridge, Averham Bypass was completed in 1997.

During WWII, an aircraft crashed east of the village.

In 1946, a large area of riverside land was sold to the Derbyshire and Nottinghamshire Electric Power Company; the building of Staythorpe Power Station was begun and the first turbine unit was put into service in March 1950. Thirteen cottages were built for the managers and chemists of the new plant in 1947, which greatly increased the size of the village.

The housing development was commissioned by its successor British Electricity Authority, the initials (BEA) phonetically forming the name of the estate Behay Gardens. The cottages were designed by local architect Thomas Cecil Howitt, OBE, who was a British provincial architect of the 20th century and is chiefly remembered for designing prominent public buildings, such as the Council House and Processional Way in Nottingham.

A larger power station, Staythorpe B, was built alongside the first, construction commenced in 1956 and was officially opened in May 1962. The first or 'A' station was decommissioned in 1983 and demolition was started in 1986 and finished in 1988. Staythorpe B closed in 1994. Staythorpe C opened in 2010.

The Hugh's Close estate was built in the middle 1990s, and was the only new development in the parish after Behay Gardens, which has since been sold off to the general public.

== Geography ==
=== Locality ===
The settlement is situated 3 miles (4.8 km) west of Newark-on-Trent and lies alongside the banks of the River Trent. The village is primarily rural in nature, with much farmland but very little in way of amenities.

Staythorpe's neighbours include

- Averham to the north;
- Upton to the west;
- Rolleston to the south;
- Farndon to the east.

Rundell and Pingley Dykes are two streams which run through the parish.

The land is very low-lying and level, varying little in elevation between 12–14 metres (39–46 ft) throughout.

=== Communities ===
There are three distinct residential areas in Staythorpe parish:

- The historic village area by Pingley Lane
- Behay Gardens
- The Hughs Close gated community alongside the Nottingham to Lincoln railway level crossing.

== Governance and demographics ==
The population of Staythorpe as recorded for the 2021 UK census is 93 residents. Averham, nearby Kelham and Staythorpe, although each are parished, they are grouped together to form a parish council for administrative efficiency due to their small populations.

== Economy ==
Other than farming, electricity generation and distribution are the only large scale local industries:

- Staythorpe Power Station is located by the riverside and owned by RWE
- There is a large substation operated by the National Grid.

== Landmarks ==
The long distance Trent Valley Way walking path passes through the parish and follows the River Trent.

There is one listed building, the Manor House based in the core village area and is designated at Grade II. It dates from the end of the 18th century.

== Transport ==
The Nottingham-Lincoln line passes through the parish west to east. The nearest National Rail station to the town is 1 mile (1.6 km) away at Rolleston; it lies adjacent to Southwell Racecourse. East Midlands Railway provides a two-hourly service between Crewe and Newark Castle; direct trains also connect to Leicester, Lincoln and Nottingham.
