= Kelham =

Village and civil parish in Nottinghamshire, England

Coordinates: 53.091°N 0.845°W

- Village and civil parish
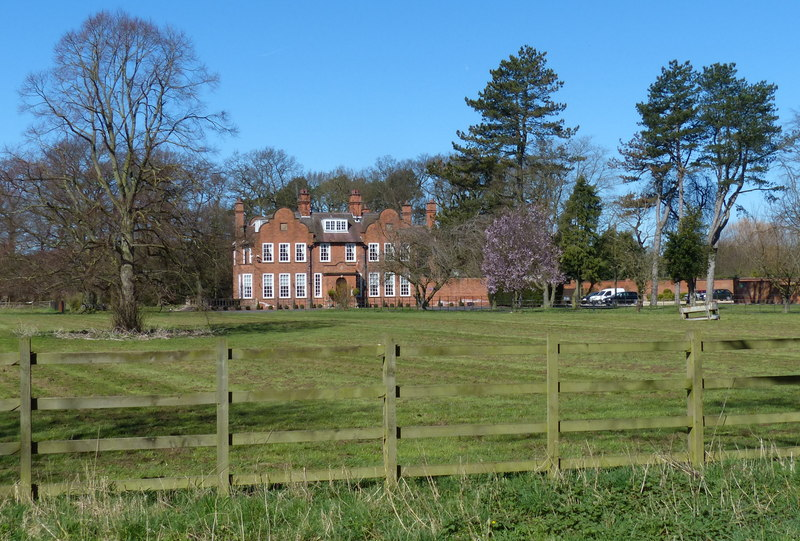
- Kelham House

- Location within Nottinghamshire
- Interactive map of Kelham
- Area: 2.64 sq mi (6.8 km^{2})
- Population: 203 (2021)
  - Density: 77/sq mi (30/km^{2})
- OS grid reference: SK 7755
  - London: 115 mi (185 km) SSE
- District: Newark and Sherwood
- Shire county: Nottinghamshire
- Region: East Midlands
- Country: England
- Sovereign state: United Kingdom
- Post town: Newark
- Postcode district: NG23
- Dialling code: 01636
- Police: Nottinghamshire
- Fire: Nottinghamshire
- Ambulance: East Midlands
- UK Parliament: Newark
- Website: https://www.hugofox.com/community/averham-kelham-and-staythorpe-parish-council-15064/your-parish-council/

Kelham is a small village and civil parish in Nottinghamshire, England. It is about 3 miles (4.8 km) northwest of Newark on a bend in the A617 road near its crossing of the River Trent. The population of the civil parish taken at the 2011 census was 207, falling slightly to 203 at the 2021 census.

== Historical ==
Kelham was described in 1853 in White's Directory of Nottinghamshire as "a small but pleasant village and parish, upon the Worksop Road, and on the west bank of the Trent, 2 miles (3.2 km) north-west of Newark. Its parish contains 208 inhabitants and 1,800 acres (7.3 km^{2}) of land, of which 484 acres (1.96 km^{2}) are on the island formed by the two rivers betwixt it and Newark. It has long been the seat and property of the Suttons, who once held the title of Lord Lexington. It is now the property of John Henry Manners Sutton Esq., who resides at the Hall, which is a plain but elegant building, with a centre and wings of brick, with stone corners and window frames, standing in a handsome lawn, near the Trent.

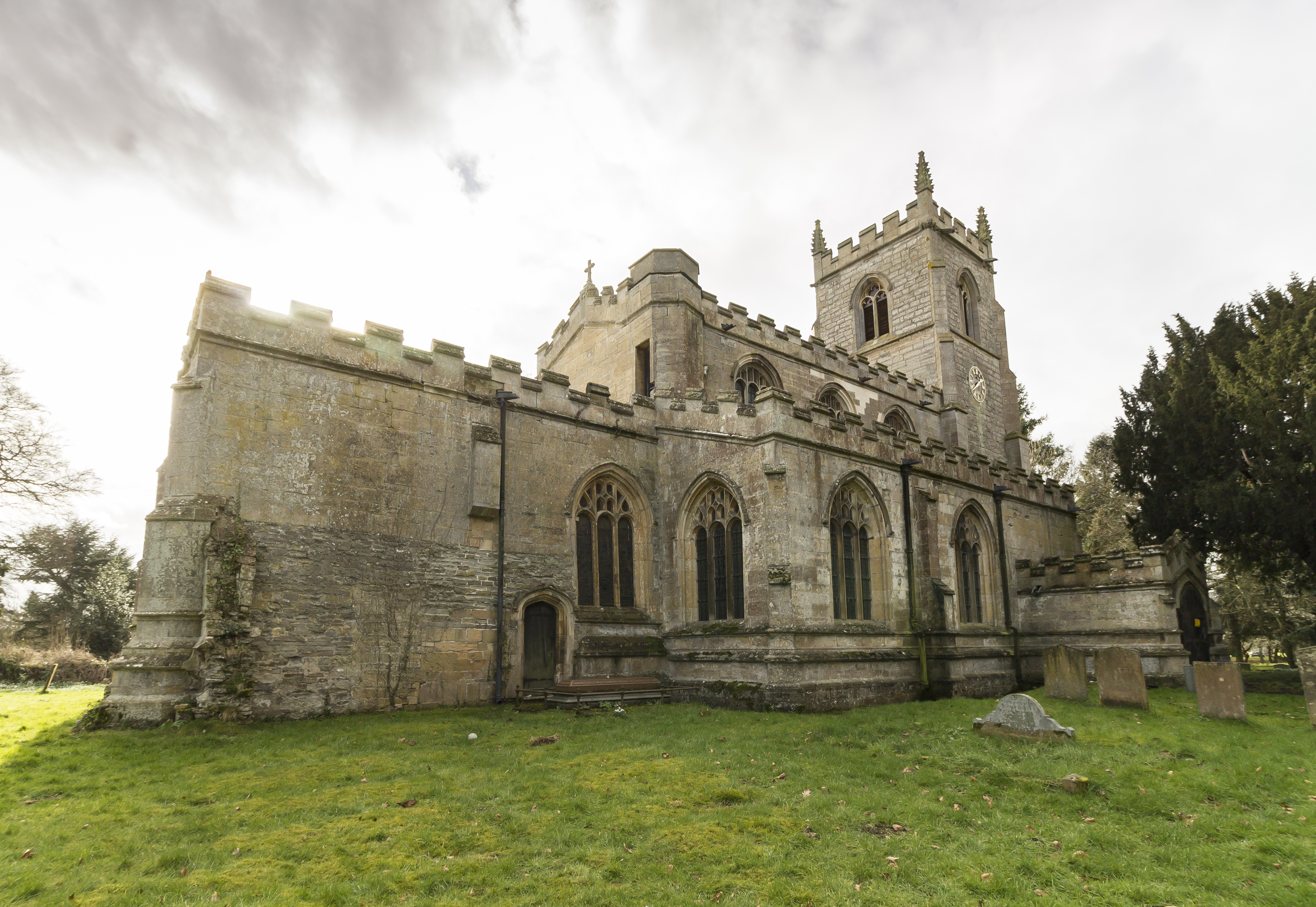
St Wilfred’s Church

"A curious wooden bridge which crosses the river close to the lawn has been taken down, and a light but substantial iron bridge erected in its place at a cost of £3,000. The church dedicated to St. Wilfred, had a handsome tower and three bells. It was new-roofed and completely renovated in 1844. Here is a richly wrought monument of the last Lord Lexington and his Lady, of fine statuary marble, but the figures are strangely placed back-to-back. The living is a rectory, valued in the King's books at £19 8s 4d, annexed to that of Averham, being in the same patronage and incumbency. The poor have the interest of £25 left by an unknown donor."

== Kelham Hall ==
Kelham Hall was originally the home of the Manners-Sutton family (a family connected to the Dukes of Rutland, the Marquess of Granby, and Viscount Canterbury) of Averham. It is a Grade I listed building standing in 52 acres of parkland. The listing (1973, updated in 1990) included this summary: "Gothic revival style. 1859-61 ... Incorporates service range, 1844-46 by A. Salvin ... Service range in Renaissance revival style. Brick and ashlar with ashlar dressings, gabled, hipped and pyramidal slate roofs" and that it had been modified in the 19th and 20th century. The "Former monastic buildings and chapel", adjoining Kelham Hall, which "had been converted to offices and function room", have been Grade II listed since 1990.

The third and present Kelham Hall "is considered a masterpiece of high Victorian Gothic architecture, entirely asymmetrical, with a gloriously irregular skyline, and crowning 'grandiloquent' towers." It was designed by Sir George Gilbert Scott and completed in 1863. Not long after the fire, "a new Kelham Hall, of magnificent proportions, and of an architectural beauty far superior to that possessed by its predecessors, either at Kelham or Averham was erected in the Italian style... and is justly said to be one of (Scott's)...most successful works." In 1865 Gilbert Scott reused many of the design details of Kelham Hall on a much larger scale for the façade of the Midland Grand Hotel at St Pancras railway station in London, completed in 1876.

The Manners-Sutton family then ran into financial difficulties and the Hall was sold to the Society of the Sacred Mission in 1903 and run as a theological college. It was occupied by military forces during World War I. The Great Chapel "was dedicated in 1928 and was a masterpiece. It was almost square with a great central dome, (62 feet across and 68 feet (21 m) high), the second largest concrete dome in England. A few visitors said it reminded them of Stonehenge – massive, austere and mysterious."

The Society of the Sacred Mission theological college closed in 1972 due to declining numbers. The chapel was desanctified.

=== Recent history ===
In 1973, the Hall became the head office of Newark and Sherwood District Council.

Kelham Hall was sold to Jonathan Pass in 2014 who formed a private company, Kelham Hall Ltd; he had previously held a temporary leasehold on the ground floor. In May 2015 Newark and Sherwood Concert Band moved its rehearsal base to Kelham Hall and now rehearses there weekly in the Dome.

The new owner took full possession after Newark & Sherwood District Council moved out of Kelham Hall into a new building close to Newark town centre in 2017.

The Hall was to become a prestigious hotel, conference centre and health spa, according to Jonathan Pass, managing director of Kelham Hall Ltd. Initially, Pass began redeveloping Kelham Hall & Country Park into a venue for weddings and conferences; that use commenced after planning consent was obtained. No overnight accommodation was offered.

The conversion to a hotel was not completed; an October 2019 news item indicated that Averham, Kelham and Staythorpe Parish Council had some objections to such a large hotel, since the previous application had proposed 71 bedrooms. By June 2020, however, another news source stated that the building was "ready to be used as a 103-bed hotel and spa with full planning consent to do so". Also in June 2020, the Corporate Hotels division of Christie & Co began to market Kelham Hall for sale with a guide price of £10 million, as a development opportunity: "a chance to create what could be one of the best hotels in the country".

After the former operators of the wedding and entertainments venue went into administration in June 2021 with cancellations of weddings due to COVID-19 restrictions, in September 2021 the Hall was being promoted as being under new ownership, renamed as The Renaissance at Kelham Hall, continuing as a wedding and entertainments venue.

== Notable people ==
- Robert Sutton (1813-1885), first-class cricketer and reverend

== See also ==
- Listed buildings in Kelham
