= North Water Viaduct =

19th century bridge in Aberdeenshire, Scotland

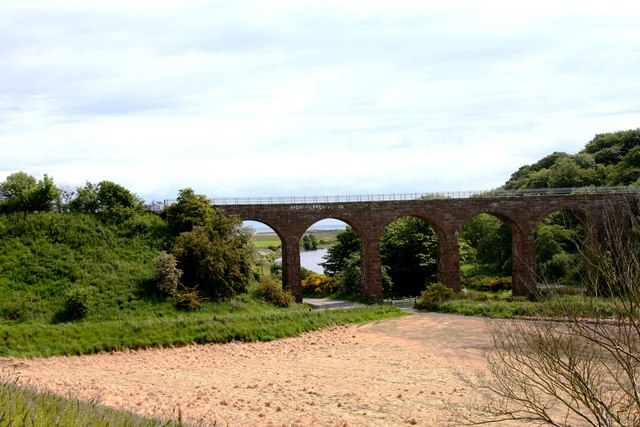
- Side view of the viaduct
- Coordinates: 56.75103°N 2.45125°W
- OS grid reference: NO 72503 62247
- Carries: 1
- Crosses: River North Esk
- Locale: Aberdeenshire
- Preceded by: Lower North Water Bridge

History
- Opened: 1865

Listed Building – Category B
- Official name: Bervie Branch Railway Viaduct Over North Esk
- Designated: 10 June 1971
- Reference no.: LB16331

Location
- Interactive map of North Water Viaduct

The North Water Viaduct is a disused railway viaduct located north of Montrose, Scotland. It was built by Blyth and Blyth Appointed Engineers for the Montrose and Bervie Railway and crosses the River North Esk. It has eleven spans. It is located adjacent to the older Lower North Water Bridge which carries the A92 road.

The railway opened in 1865. It closed to passenger services in 1951 and to freight in 1966. In 1986, British Rail applied for permission to demolish the viaduct, but was refused. In 1996, it was announced that a grant from Historic Scotland would be available for refurbishing the viaduct.

The viaduct now forms part of the National Cycle Network. It is Category B listed.

== See also ==
- List of bridges in Scotland
