= North Muskham =

Village and civil parish in Nottinghamshire, England

Coordinates: 53.1167°N 0.8167°W

- Village and civil parish
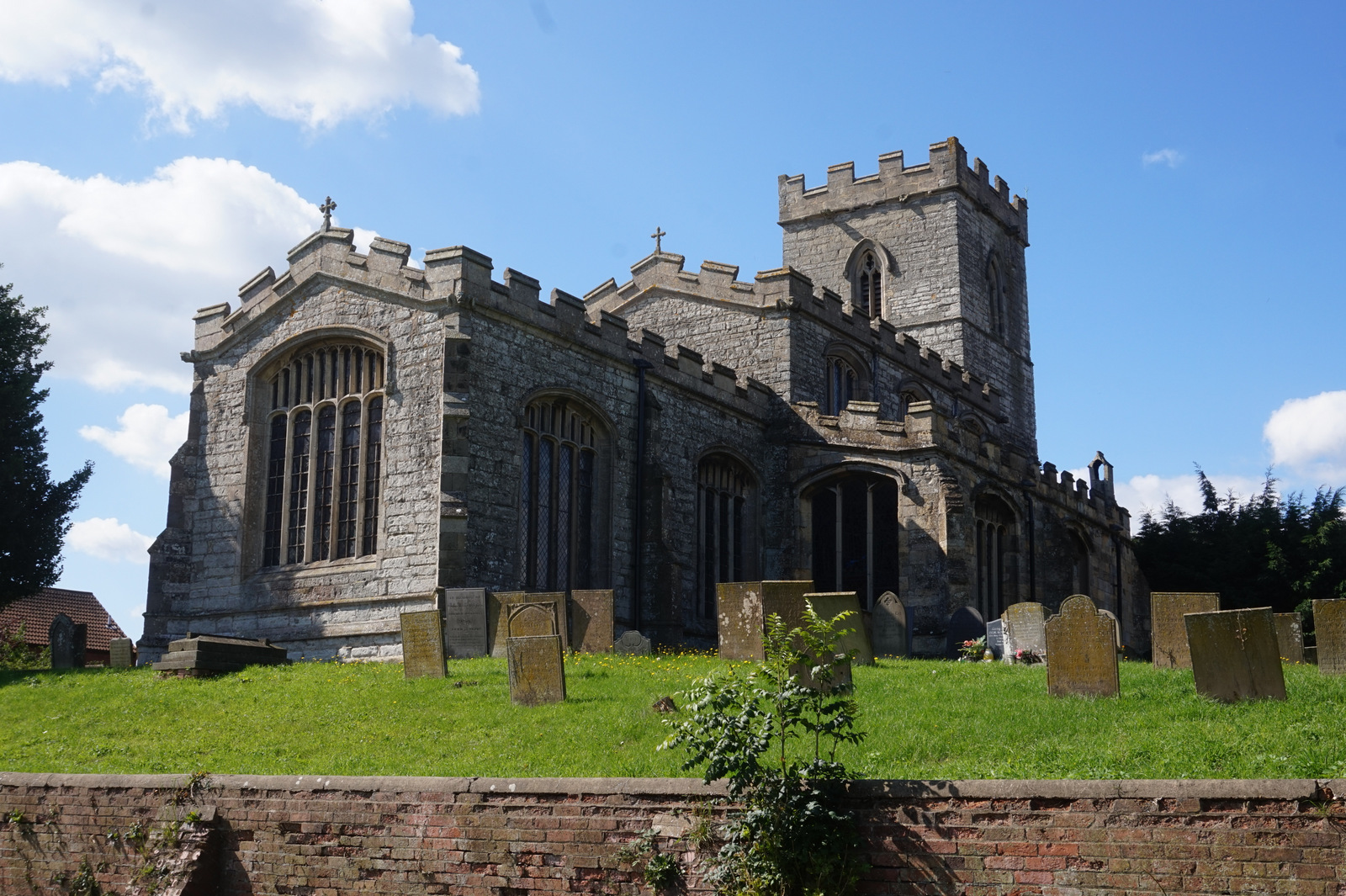
- St Wilfred’s Church

- Location within Nottinghamshire
- Interactive map of North Muskham
- Area: 1.5 sq mi (3.9 km^{2})
- Population: 980 (2021)
  - Density: 653/sq mi (252/km^{2})
- OS grid reference: SK 798588
  - London: 115 mi (185 km) SSE
- District: Newark and Sherwood
- Shire county: Nottinghamshire
- Region: East Midlands
- Country: England
- Sovereign state: United Kingdom
- Post town: NEWARK
- Postcode district: NG23
- Dialling code: 01636
- Police: Nottinghamshire
- Fire: Nottinghamshire
- Ambulance: East Midlands
- UK Parliament: Newark
- Website: www.hugofox.com/community/north-muskham-parish-council-10135/home

North Muskham is a village and civil parish in Nottinghamshire, England, close to the border with Lincolnshire. It is located between the River Trent and the A1 road, 3 miles (5 km) north of Newark-upon-Trent. The parish has a population of 943 (2001 census) with around 360 properties, increasing to 985 at the 2011 census, and reducing slightly to 980 at the 2021 census.

St Wilfrid's Church is the parish church, a medieval building which is Grade I listed. It was restored during 1906 and 1907.

There is currently one public house: 'The Muskham Ferry'.

== History ==
The village appears in the Domesday Book as Muscham in the hundred of Lythe.

North Muskham was a large ancient parish, which also included the villages of Bathley and Holme. Until about 1575 the River Trent ran further east, but there was then a cataclysmic flood which changed the course of the river. Holme was therefore separated by the river from the rest of the parish. In 1866 Holme and Bathley became separate civil parishes.

Between 1870 and 1872 John Marius Wilson's Imperial Gazetteer of England and Wales recorded the parish as having 194 houses with a real estate value of £5,161, with a manor belonging to Mr J. T. Edge.

== Population ==
In the 1801 census the parish of North Muskham (then including Bathley and Holme) had a population of 361. In 1861 according to official census records North Muskham had a total of inhabited permanent residences with a total population of 614 residents. In the 1911 census the parish was smaller (without Bathley and Holme), with an area of 1,203 acres and a population of 526 persons, 262 males and 254 females. The 1921 census saw the population drop with a total of 491 persons registered, but during the next decade the population increased very marginally to a total of 509. The 2001 census reports showed that the parish had a population of 943 with around 360 properties, increasing to 985 at the 2011 census, and reducing slightly to 980 at the 2021 census.

== See also ==
- Listed buildings in North Muskham
- South Muskham
