= Winthorpe Bridge =

Box girder bridge in Nottinghamshire, England

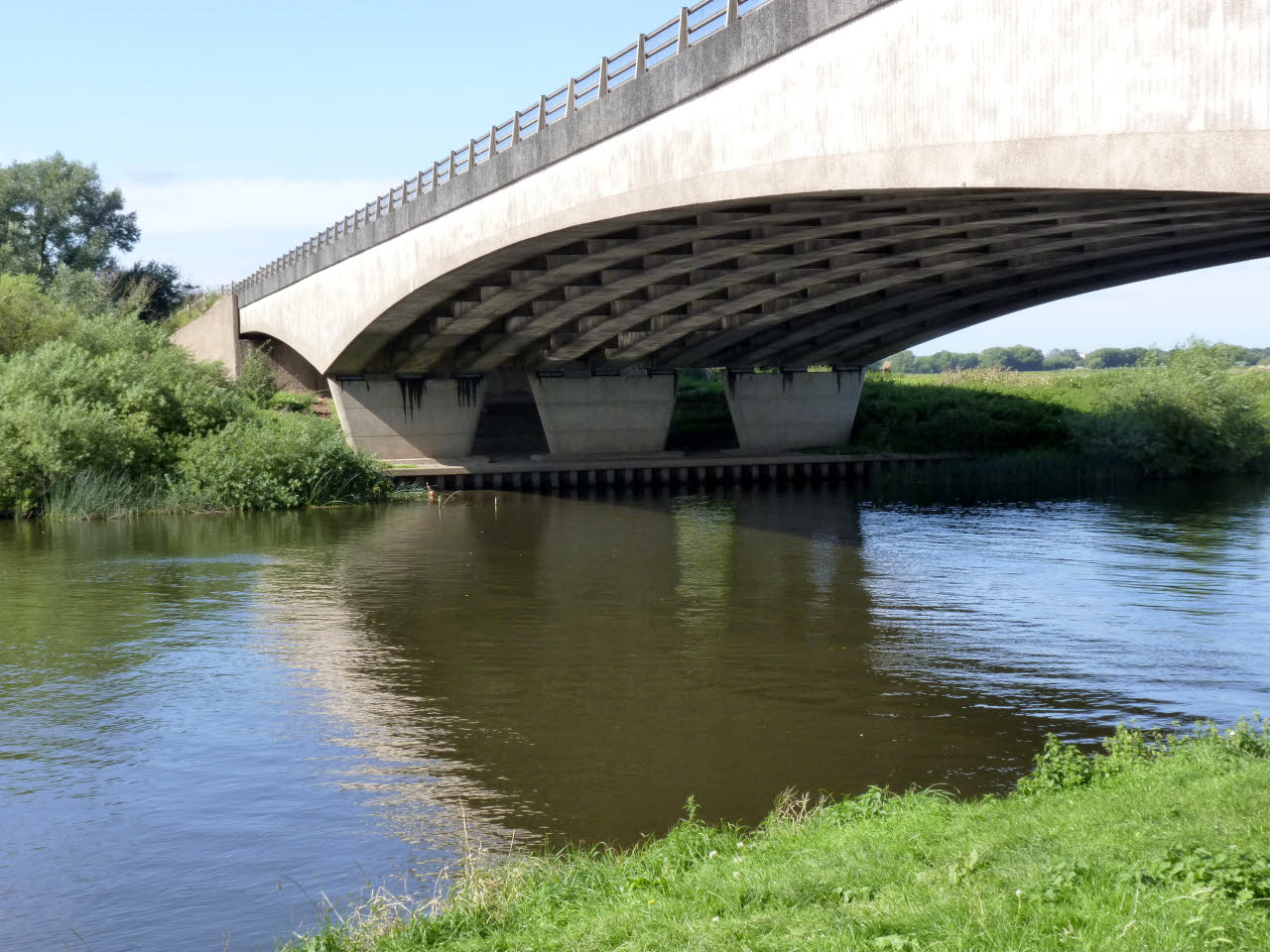
- View in September 2012
- Coordinates: 53.10°N 0.80°W
- OS grid reference: SK805567
- Carries: A1
- Crosses: River Trent
- Locale: Winthorpe, Nottinghamshire, England
- Maintained by: National Highways
- Heritage status: Grade II* listed

Characteristics
- Material: Reinforced concrete
- Total length: 520 ft (160 m)
- Width: 82 ft (25 m)
- Longest span: 260 ft (79 m)

History
- Constructed by: Christiani & Nielsen
- Construction start: March 1962
- Construction cost: £465,695
- Opened: 27 July 1964

Statistics
- Daily traffic: A1 dual carriageway on the Newark bypass

Winthorpe Bridge is a concrete box girder bridge, carrying the A1 road over the River Trent in Winthorpe, Nottinghamshire, England.

== History ==
The contracts for the bridge were awarded on 20 March 1962 for £495,695, and construction began on 16 July that year. The 6-mile (9.7 km) bypass was to cost £3,250,000. It was opened on 27 July 1964, by Ernest Marples.

The bridge was constructed by the Danish bridge-builder Christiani & Nielsen. Another Danish civil engineering company Bierrum built the nearby cooling towers, along the River Trent to the north. The Newark bypass was built by Robert McGregor & Sons who would have laid the concrete pavement on the bridge. The north-bound surface had the concrete pavement laid in forty days, with three concrete-batching sites along the bypass preparing the concrete.

The bridge was Grade II* listed on 29 May 1998.

== Structure ==
The bridge crosses the River Trent in Winthorpe, Nottinghamshire, which is the third-longest river in England, at 185 miles (298 km). It is a reinforced-concrete bridge made out of nine box girders.

== See also ==
- Grade II* listed buildings in Nottinghamshire
- Listed buildings in South Muskham
