= Robert Sutton, 2nd Baron Lexinton =

English diplomat

Robert Sutton, 2nd Baron Lexington PC (6 January 1662 – 19 September 1723) was an English diplomat.

== Family ==
He was the son of Robert Sutton, 1st Baron Lexington and his third wife Mary St. Leger.

On 14 September 1691, he married Margaret, (d. April 1703), the daughter of Sir Giles Hungerford of Coulston, Wiltshire, by whom he had three children:

- William George Sutton (1697 – October 1713), died in Madrid while his father was ambassador there
- Bridget Sutton (30 Nov 1699 – 1734), married John Manners, 3rd Duke of Rutland
- Leonora Cordelia Margueretta (c. 1700 – October 1715)

== Career ==
He served as a captain of a troop of horse, resigning his commission in 1686. He was appointed a gentleman of horse to the Prince and Princess of Denmark (Princess Anne, later Queen Anne), in 1690; a position he resigned in February 1692/3. Lord Lexington supported in the House of Lords the elevation of William of Orange to the throne, and was employed by that king at court and on diplomatic business, being sent as envoy extraordinary to the Elector of Brandenburg in 1689.

He was appointed a Privy Counsellor on 17 March 1692, and was a Gentleman of the Bedchamber to King William from 1692 until 1702. Lexington was again sent abroad in 1694 as envoy extraordinary to the Court in Vienna, and served until the Treaty of Ryswick was concluded in 1697. He was a Lord of Trade from 1699 to 1702, and ambassador to the Court of Madrid from 1712 until 1713, during negotiations for the Treaty of Utrecht.

His appointment to the Privy Council was not renewed upon the accession of George I in 1714. He was sent abroad for the last time in 1718, as minister at Vienna. He died on 10 September 1723.

His letters from Vienna, selected and edited by H. M. Sutton, were published as the Lexington Papers (1851). Lexington's barony became extinct on his death, but his estates descended to Lord Robert and Lord George Manners-Sutton, the younger sons of his daughter Bridget and her husband John Manners, 3rd Duke of Rutland.

== Memorial ==
A memorial to him and his wife is in St Wilfrid's Church, Kelham, Nottinghamshire.

Diplomatic posts
Vacant Last known title holder: Sir Robert Southwell	English envoy-extraordinary to Brandenburg; 1689	Succeeded by James Johnson
Preceded by George Stepney as Agent	English envoy in Vienna; 1694–1697	Succeeded by Robert Sutton as Secretary
Preceded by The Duke of Argyll	British ambassador to Spain; 1712–1713	Vacant Title next held by George Bubb as Envoy extraordinary and plenipotentiary
Peerage of England
Preceded by Robert Sutton	Baron Lexinton; 1668–1723	Extinct
