= Listed buildings in North Muskham =

North Muskham is a civil parish in the Newark and Sherwood district of Nottinghamshire, England. The parish contains twelve listed buildings that are recorded in the National Heritage List for England. Of these, one is listed at Grade I, the highest of the three grades, and the others are at Grade II, the lowest grade. The parish contains the village of North Muskham and the surrounding area, and all the listed buildings are in the village. Most of these are houses and associated structures, and the others consist of a church and a village cross.

== Key ==
Grade	Criteria
I	Buildings of exceptional interest, sometimes considered to be internationally important
II	Buildings of national importance and special interest

== Buildings ==
Name and location	Photograph	Date	Notes	Grade
St Wilfrid's Church; 53.11862°N 0.80874°W		Late 12th century	The church has been altered and extended through the centuries. It consists of a nave, north and south aisles, a south porch, a chancel and a west tower. The tower has two stages, a chamfered plinth, corner buttresses, a string course, lancet windows, a clock face, paired bell openings with hood moulds, an eaves band with masks and eight gargoyles, and a moulded embattled parapet. There are also embattled parapets and gargoyles on the body of the church.	I
Village cross 53.12572°N 0.81158°W		14th century (probable)	The village cross stands in an enclosure by the roadside. It is in stone and about 1.5 metres (4 ft 11 in) high. The cross has a square base with chamfered corners, and a broken octagonal shaft, tapering towards the top.	II
The Old Hall; 53.11821°N 0.81050°W		c. 1679	Alterations were made, and the west front was remodelled, in about 1820. The house is in stone and brick, it is whitewashed, on a partial plinth, and has rebated eaves, and roofs of pantile and slate. The main block has two storeys and attics, and three bays, and there are wings, including a service wing with two storeys and wo bays. On the main front is a porch with iron columns, and a doorway with a moulded surround. The windows are a mix of casements and sashes, some with rubbed brick segmental heads, and one with Gothic glazing.	II
Cherry Cottage; 53.12190°N 0.81238°W	—	18th century	Two houses, later combined, in brick, rendered and colourwashed, with rebated eaves and a pantile roof. There are two storeys, four bays, a lean-to at the west, and an outshut at the rear. The windows are a mix of casements and horizontally-sliding sashes, and there is a dormer.	II
North Road House; 53.12358°N 0.81531°W	—	Mid 18th century	The house, originally a vicarage, was extended in the 19th century. It is in whitewashed brick, with a floor band, a parapet with cross-shaped holes, and a pantile roof with stone coped gables. There are two storeys and attics, a main range of four bays, a single storey single-bay extension with a shaped coped wall, and a lean-to addition. The doorway has a fanlight, there is a French window and a canted bay window, and the other windows, which have stuccoed reeded lintels with keystones, are a mix of sashes and casements, some with flat heads, some with round-arched heads, and others with pointed arched heads.	II
The Shades; 53.12591°N 0.81162°W		Late 18th century	A brick house with cogged and dentilled eaves, and a pantile roof with coped gables and kneelers. There are two storeys and attics, and an L-shaped plan, with a front range of three bays, and a rear wing with two storeys and a single bay. The central doorway has reeded jambs, and the windows on the front are sashes with rubbed brick segmental heads. Elsewhere, there are casement windows and horizontally-sliding sashes.	II
Stable, outhouse and pump, The Shades; 53.12589°N 0.81129°W	—	Late 18th century	The stable and outhouse are in brick with dentilled eaves and pantile roofs. The stable has two storeys and two bays, and contains stable doors and round openings. The outhouse has a single storey and a single bay, and contains garage doors. At the west gable end is a lead pump with a curved iron handle in a rectangular wooden case, and in front is a round stone trough.	II
Trent Bank House; 53.12011°N 0.80903°W		Late 18th century	A brick house with dentilled eaves, and a pantile roof with coped gables and kneelers. There are three storeys and three bays, to the left is a single-storey three-bay service wing, and at the rear is a lean-to. The central doorway has a reeded surround, a fanlight and a dentilled hood on curved brackets. The windows on the front are sashes with rubbed brick segmental heads, and elsewhere there are casement windows and horizontally-sliding sashes.	II
Outbuilding, North Road House; 53.12369°N 0.81529°W	—	Early 19th century	The outbuilding, which has an ornamental design, is in whitewashed brick, with an eaves band, a coped parapet with cross-shaped holes, and a lean-to pantile roof. There is a single storey and a single bay. It contains a small casement window, a door with a timber lintel, and two diamond-shaped vents.	II
Railings and gate, North Road House; 53.12348°N 0.81557°W	—	Early 19th century	Enclosing the garden is a dwarf brick wall with stone coping, and wrought iron railings with cast iron finials. It contains square and octagonal gate piers with ball finials, and gates matching the railings.	II
Edgefield House Hotel and wall 53.12792°N 0.81524°W	—	1863	A vicarage, later a hotel, designed by G. E. Street, in brick with stone dressings, a string course, and tile roofs. There are three storeys, an L-shaped plan with a main range of four bays, and a two-storey single-bay outbuilding to the east. The windows are a mix of sashes and casements, some mullioned and transomed. To the north is a brick boundary wall with shaped brick coping and a gateway with stepped coping.	II
Coach house and wall, Edgefield House Hotel; 53.12806°N 0.81540°W	—	1863	The coach house, designed by G. E. Street, is in brick with stone dressings, and has a half-hipped tile roof. There is a single storey and attics, and two bays, and it contains doorways and casement windows. At the south end is a brick boundary wall with two stepped buttresses and shaped brick coping extending for 1 metre (3 ft 3 in).	II
