= Baron Lexinton =

Extinct barony in the Peerage of England

Baron Lexinton (sometimes referred to as Baron Lexington), Aram (Averham) in the County of Nottingham, was a title in the Peerage of England. It was created on 21 November 1645 for Robert Sutton. The barony became extinct upon the death of his son Robert, the second Baron, in 1723. The family estates passed to Lord Robert Manners-Sutton and subsequently to his brother Lord George Manners-Sutton (see Baron Manners and Viscount Canterbury).

== Barons Lexinton (1645) ==
- Robert Sutton, 1st Baron Lexinton (1594–1668)
- Robert Sutton, 2nd Baron Lexinton (1662–1723)

== See also ==
- Baron Manners
- Viscount Canterbury
