= Listed buildings in Averham =

Averham is a civil parish in the Newark and Sherwood district of Nottinghamshire, England. The parish contains seven listed buildings that are recorded in the National Heritage List for England. Of these, one is listed at Grade I, the highest of the three grades, one is at Grade II*, the middle grade, and the others are at Grade II, the lowest grade. The parish contains the village of Averham and the surrounding countryside, and the listed buildings consist of houses, and a church and its lychgate.

== Key ==
Grade	Criteria
I	Buildings of exceptional interest, sometimes considered to be internationally important
II*	Particularly important buildings of more than special interest
II	Buildings of national importance and special interest

== Buildings ==
Name and location	Photograph	Date	Notes	Grade
Church of St Michael and All Angels; 53.08105°N 0.85476°W		c. 1000	The church, which incorporates Saxon material, has been altered and extended through the centuries, including restorations in 1857 by Charles Baily, and in 1907 by C. Hodgson Fowler. It is built in stone with some rendered brick, and has a tile roof with some lead. The church consists of a nave, a south porch, a chancel with a north chapel, and a west tower. The tower has two stages, a chamfered plinth, diagonal buttresses, a coved string course, a south clock face, a coved eaves band with eight gargoyles, and an embattled parapet with shield in the panels, and eight crocketed pinnacles. The porch has a gabled embattled parapet with a cross, and a doorway with a moulded surround, above which are coats of arms and a pilaster with an angel corbel.	I
Averham Park House; 53.09981°N 0.89096°W	—	1718–20	A hunting lodge, later a private house, it is in red brick on a plinth, with a floor band and a tile roof. There are two storeys and attics, a double-pile plan, and a front of nine bays. On the south front is a projecting gabled bay, and most of the windows are sashes. To the right is a service wing with two storeys and two bays.	II*
South Farm; 53.09971°N 0.89132°W	—	c. 1720	Originally the service wing for Averham Park House, it was later considerably enlarged into a house. This is in brick with a floor band, dentilled eaves, and a hipped roof of tile and pantile. There are two storeys and a C-shaped plan, with a north front of six bays. The windows on the front are sashes, those in the upper floor in oval openings with keystones, and elsewhere are casement windows and a French window.	II
Rectory Cottage; 53.08131°N 0.85671°W	—	18th century	The house is in brick, partly rendered, with rebated and dentilled eaves and a tile roof. There are two storeys, and an L-shaped plan, with three bays and a wing on the south front. The windows are sashes, some horizontally-sliding, and some with segmental heads.	II
Yew Tree Cottage; 53.08224°N 0.85931°W	—	18th century	A pair of cottages, later combined into one house, in brick on a stone plinth, with dentilled eaves, and a pantile roof with coped gables and kneelers. There are two storeys and four bays, and an outshut at the rear left. The doorway at the rear has a timber lean-to porch, and the windows are a mix of casements and horizontally-sliding sashes, all with segmental heads.	II
The Old Rectory; 53.08097°N 0.85563°W		1838–39	The rectory is in stuccoed brick on a stone plinth, with deep eaves and a slate roof. There are three storeys, and an L-shaped plan, with a main block of six unequal bays. The west front has a projecting wing to the right, a two-storey porch tower with a pyramidal roof, and at the ends are lean-to porches. The porch tower has a doorway with pilasters and a moulded architrave, and above it is a panel containing a coat of arms and the date. On the east front are two hip roofed bays, each with a canted bay window, and in the centre is a conservatory. Elsewhere, the windows are a mix of casements and horizontally-sliding sashes.	II
Lychgate, Church of St Michael and All Angels; 53.08076°N 0.85509°W		19th century	The lychgate is in timber and has a hipped tile roof. It has a square plan, and four strutted posts with a chamfered rail and herringbone board infill. There are arched braces to the moulded tie beams, and the roof has a centre post and arch braces.	II
