= Church of St Michael and All Angels, Averham =

Anglican church in Nottinghamshire, England

St. Michael and All Angels, Averham
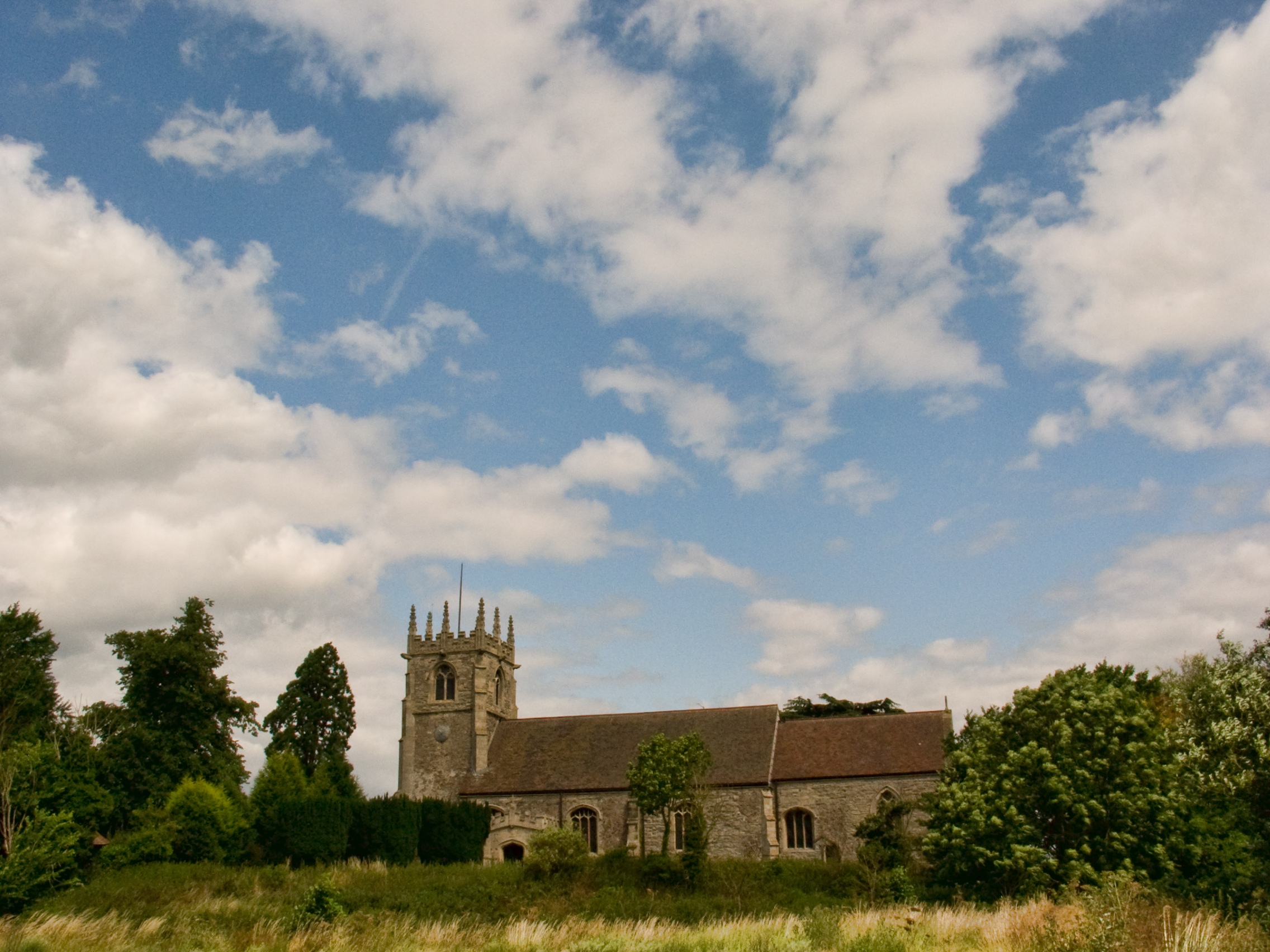
- St. Michael and All Angels, Averham
- 53°04′52″N 00°51′44″W
- Denomination: Church of England
- Churchmanship: Broad Church
- Website: www.riversideparishes.co.uk

History
- Dedication: St Michael and All Angels

Administration
- Province: York
- Diocese: Southwell and Nottingham
- Parish: Averham

Clergy
- Vicar: Revd Myra Shackley

The Church of St. Michael and All Angels, Averham is a parish church in the Church of England in Averham, Nottinghamshire.

The church is Grade I listed by the Department for Digital, Culture, Media and Sport as a building of outstanding architectural or historic interest.

== Parish structure ==
The Church of St. Michael and All Angels is part of a joint parish which includes the churches of St. Wilfrid's Church, Kelham, St. Wilfrid's Church, North Muskham and St. Wilfrid's Church, South Muskham.

== Description ==
The style of masonry in parts of the tower, nave and chancel prove that the structure is of Norman date though the tower arch is later. Also added later were the buttresses and pinnacles of the tower and the south porch (containing letters and shields referring to Sir Thomas Sutton, died 1525, and his wife). There is a fine east window in the chancel and the screen is simple early Perpendicular.

The north window contains some fragments of glass found in Kelham Hall and put together by Frederick Heathcote Sutton, rector of St. Helen's Church, Brant Broughton in Lincolnshire. Additionally, there is some late Victorian stained glass by Heaton, Butler and Bayne.

There is a wall monument to Robert Sutton, 1st Baron Lexinton who died in 1668. There are also two medieval memorials, a foliated cross and an effigy of a layman (poorly preserved).

The church was the site of inspiration for the fourth movement of T.S Eliot's poem Burnt Norton, part of his Four Quartets.

== See also ==
- Grade I listed buildings in Nottinghamshire
- Listed buildings in Averham
