= St Wilfrid's Church, North Muskham =

Coordinates: 53°07′08″N 00°48′32″W

St. Wilfrid's Church, North Muskham
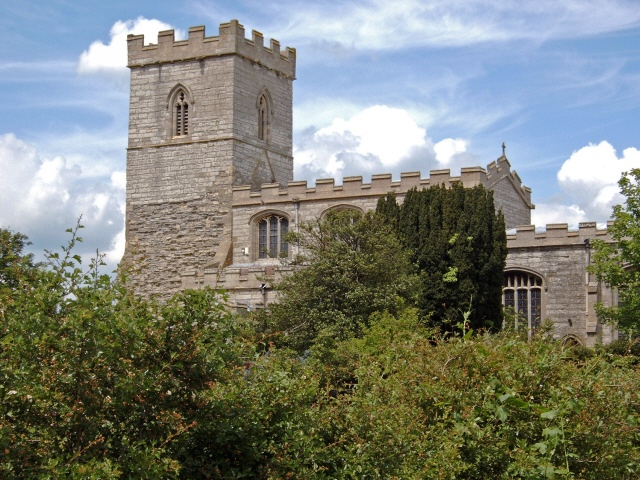
- St. Wilfrid's Church, North Muskham
- Denomination: Church of England
- Churchmanship: Broad Church
- Website: www.riversideparishes.co.uk

History
- Dedication: St Wilfrid

Administration
- Province: York
- Diocese: Southwell and Nottingham
- Parish: North Muskham

Clergy
- Vicar: Revd Georgina Hadley

St. Wilfrid's Church, North Muskham is a parish church in the Church of England in North Muskham, Nottinghamshire.

The church is Grade I listed by the Department for Digital, Culture, Media and Sport as a building of outstanding architectural or historic interest.

== History ==
The church is medieval and was restored in 1906 and 1907.

It is recorded by Dr. Thoroton that a flood which occurred about 1600 the River Trent changed its course, and separated the parish of North Muskham from the hamlet of Holme. At about the same time, Sir Thomas Barton, the descendant of a wealthy merchant, owned a large house and a great amount of property at Holme, and North Muskham Church benefited from his wealth.

The Barton family coat of arms with impalements and rebus (a bear and a tun), is displayed in various places in the church.

== Description ==
The oldest parts of the church are the lower part of the tower and the north arcade, the piers of which are octagonal and may be the earliest of this type in the county. The piers of the south arcade are Perpendicular and are similar to those of St Mary's, Nottingham. The nave has a clerestory and is covered by a contemporary timber roof. The chancel is impressive and has a five light east window. The pulpit is probably late 17th century and may be contemporary with the altar rails; Nikolaus Pevsner describes the screen as "exceptionally fully cusped".

== Parish structure ==
St. Wilfrid's Church, North Muskham is part of a joint parish which includes the churches of

- Church of St. Michael and All Angels, Averham
- St. Wilfrid's Church, Kelham
- St. Wilfrid's Church, South Muskham

== See also ==
- Grade I listed buildings in Nottinghamshire
- Listed buildings in North Muskham

== Sources ==
- The Buildings of England, Nottinghamshire. Nikolaus Pevsner
