= St Wilfrid's Church, Kelham =

Coordinates: 53°05′25″N 0°50′47″W

St. Wilfrid's Church, Kelham
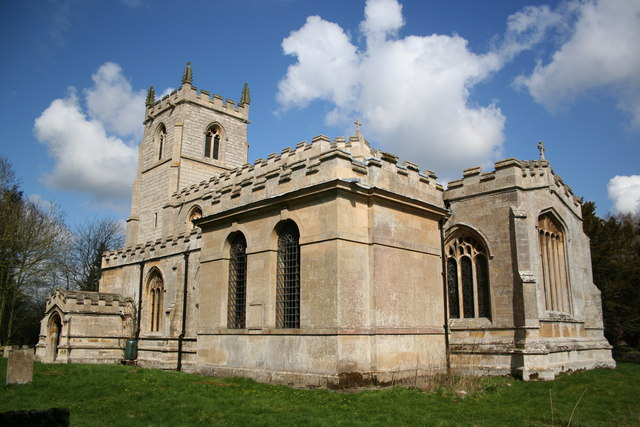
- St. Wilfrid's Church, Kelham
- Denomination: Church of England
- Churchmanship: Broad Church
- Website: www.riversideparishes.co.uk

History
- Dedication: St Wilfrid

Administration
- Province: York
- Diocese: Southwell and Nottingham
- Parish: Kelham

Clergy
- Vicar(s): Area Dean Of Newark & Southwell

St. Wilfrid's Church, Kelham is a parish church in the Church of England in Kelham, Nottinghamshire.

The church is Grade I listed by the Department for Digital, Culture, Media and Sport as a building of outstanding architectural or historic interest.

== History ==
The church is medieval and was restored in 1874 by the Durham-based architect Charles Hodgson Fowler.

== Parish structure ==
The Church of St. Wilfrid, Kelham is part of a joint parish which includes the churches of

- Church of St. Michael and All Angels, Averham
- St. Wilfrid's Church, North Muskham
- St. Wilfrid's Church, South Muskham

== Memorials ==
There is a memorial on the south side of the chancel to Robert Sutton, 2nd Baron Lexinton who died in 1723 and his wife Margaret who died in 1703.

== See also ==
- Grade I listed buildings in Nottinghamshire
- Listed buildings in Kelham

== Sources ==
- The Buildings of England, Nottinghamshire. Nikolaus Pevsner
