= St Wilfrid's Church, South Muskham =

Coordinates: 53°06′25″N 00°48′56″W

St. Wilfrid's Church, South Muskham
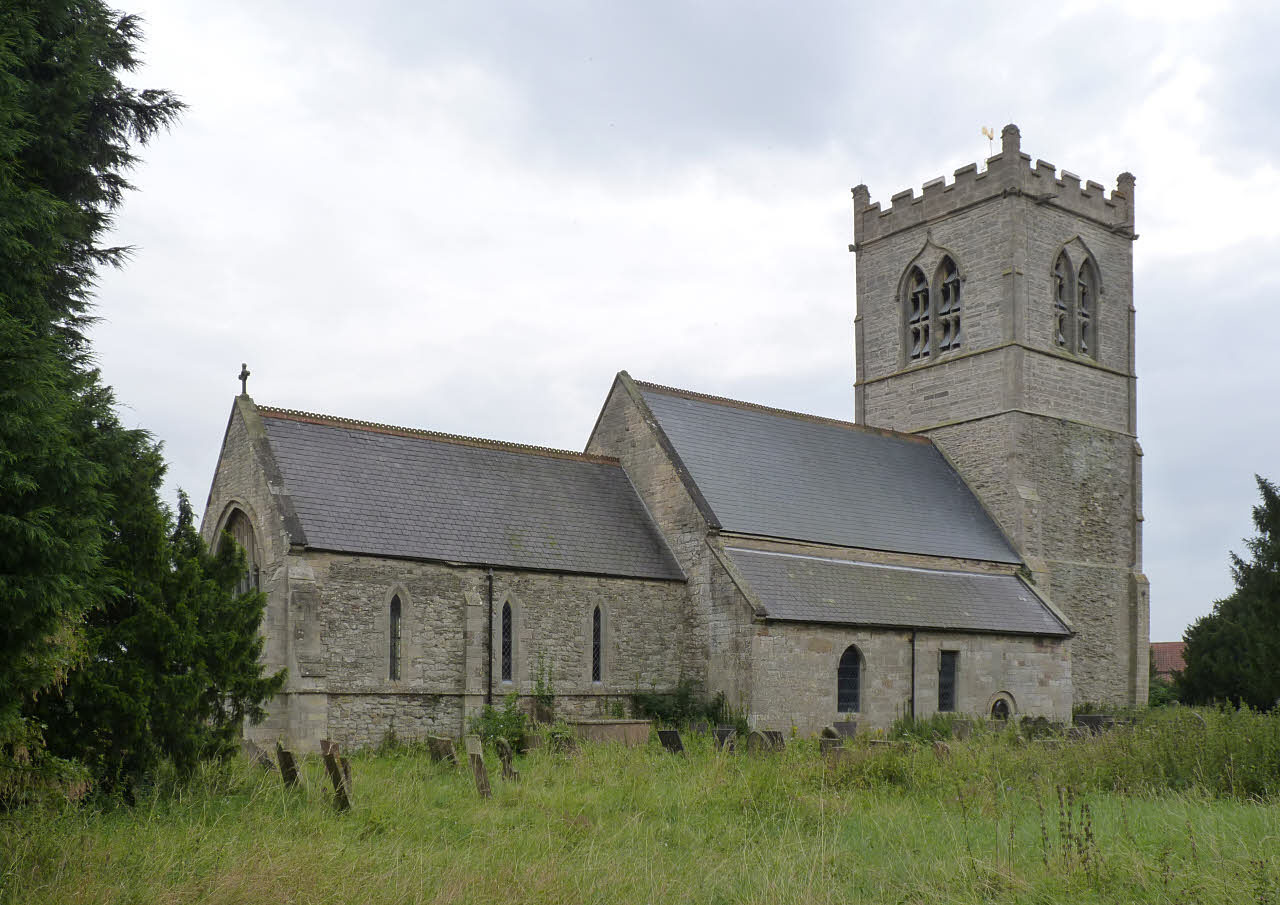
- St. Wilfrid's Church, South Muskham
- Denomination: Church of England
- Churchmanship: Broad Church
- Website: www.riversideparishes.co.uk

History
- Dedication: St Wilfrid

Administration
- Province: York
- Diocese: Southwell and Nottingham
- Parish: South Muskham

Clergy
- Vicar: Revd Myra Shackley

St. Wilfrid's Church, South Muskham is a parish church in the Church of England in South Muskham, Nottinghamshire.

The church is Grade I listed by the Department for Digital, Culture, Media and Sport as a building of outstanding architectural or historic interest.

== History ==
The church is medieval but seems to have been subject to additions over a long period. The Tower shows three separate periods of construction. The lowest section is 13th century, the middle section is 14th century and the top is 15th century.

== Parish structure ==
St. Wilfrid's Church, South Muskham is part of a joint parish which includes the churches of Church of St. Michael and All Angels, Averham, St. Wilfrid's Church, Kelham and St. Wilfrid's Church, North Muskham.

== Organ ==
=== List of organists ===
- James Harston 1870 - 1889

== See also ==
- Grade I listed buildings in Nottinghamshire
- Listed buildings in South Muskham

== Sources ==
- The Buildings of England, Nottinghamshire. Nikolaus Pevsner
