= Lower North Water Bridge =

18th century bridge in Aberdeenshire, Scotland

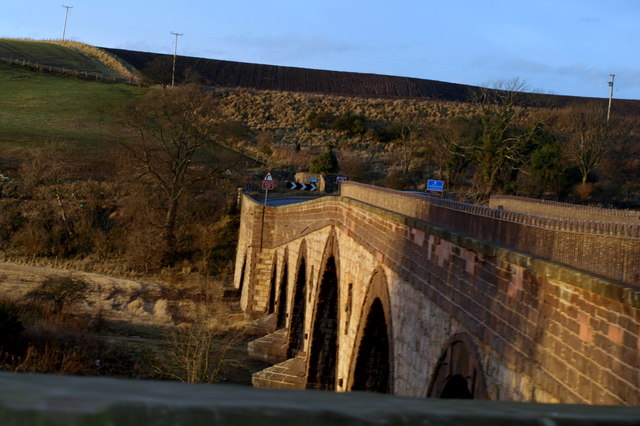
- Bridge in 2009
- Coordinates: 56.75041°N 2.45198°W
- OS grid reference: NO 72458 62178
- Carries: A92
- Crosses: River North Esk
- Locale: Aberdeenshire
- Preceded by: Marykirk Bridge
- Followed by: North Water Viaduct

Characteristics
- Design: Arch
- Material: Stone

History
- Designer: John Adam; John Smeaton; Andrew Barrie
- Construction start: 1770
- Construction end: 1775

Listed Building – Category A
- Official name: Lower North Water Bridge Over North Esk, Including Approaches
- Designated: 10 June 1971
- Reference no.: LB16330

Location
- Interactive map of Lower North Water Bridge

The Lower North Water Bridge is a road bridge north of Montrose, Scotland. It carries the A92 over the River North Esk. It is situated on the border between Angus and Aberdeenshire. It is adjacent to the North Water Viaduct which previously carried the Montrose and Bervie Railway and is now a footpath.

It is a Category A listed building.

== History ==
The bridge was constructed from 1770 to 1775. John Adam, John Smeaton, and Andrew Barrie of Montrose worked on the project. The bridge was formerly tolled, and a ruined octagonal toll house remains standing.

In 2008, the bridge underwent a £700,000 restoration.

== See also ==
- List of bridges in Scotland
