= Robert Sutton (cricketer, born 1813) =

English cricketer and reverend

Personal information
- Full name: Robert Sutton
- Born: 1 May 1813; Kelham, Nottinghamshire, England
- Died: 10 March 1885 (aged 71); Scawby, Lincolnshire, England
- Batting: Unknown

Career statistics
Competition	First-class
Matches	1
Runs scored	5
Batting average	5.00
100s/50s	–/–
Top score	5
Catches/stumpings	–/–
- Source: Cricinfo, 31 March 2019

Robert Sutton (1 May 1813 – 10 March 1885) JP was an English first-class cricketer and reverend.

The son of Robert Nassau Sutton and his wife, Mary Georgiana Manners-Sutton, at Kelham and was educated at Eton College. He made a single appearance in first-class cricket for the Gentlemen of Southwell against England at Southwell in 1846. He batted once in the match, scoring 5 runs in the Gentlemen of Southwell's first-innings before he was dismissed by Jemmy Dean. The following year he married Charlotte Nelthorpe, with the couple having eight children. He was the rector at Bilsthorpe, as well as serving as a Justice of the Peace in Lindsey, Lincolnshire.

He died in March 1885 at Scawby, Lincolnshire. His wife had predeceased him thirteen years previously.
