= Little Carlton, Nottinghamshire =

Coordinates: 53.108643°N 0.834038°W

Little Carlton
- Hamlet
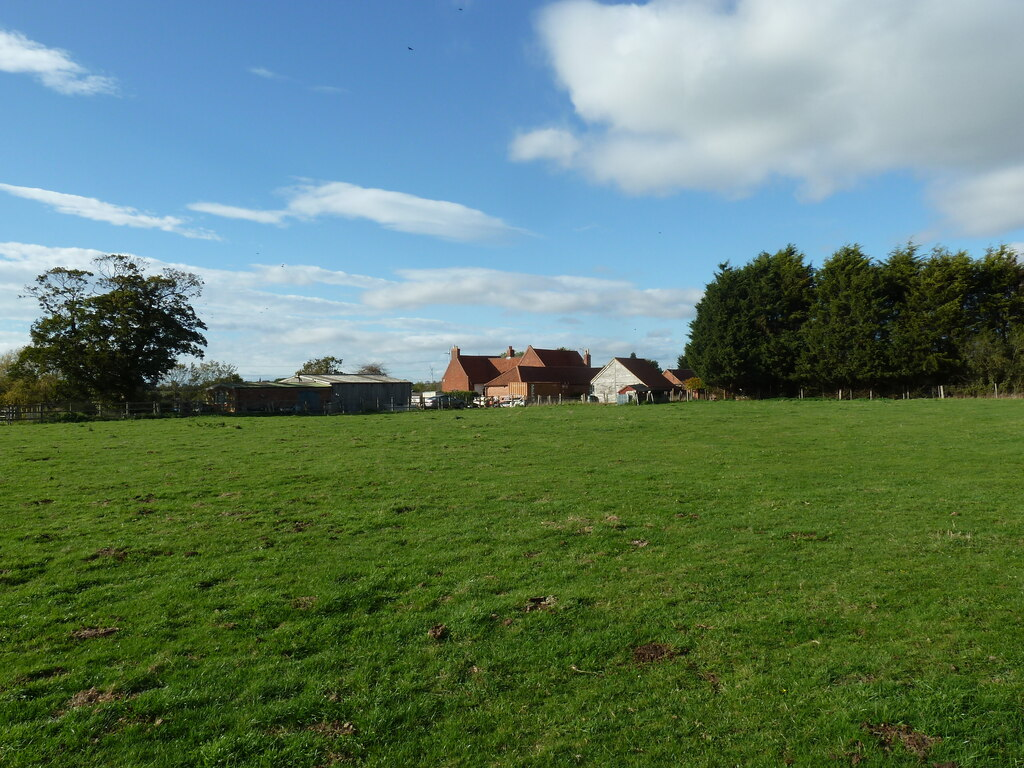
- A view of the hamlet

- Location within Nottinghamshire
- OS grid reference: SK781574
- District: Newark and Sherwood
- Shire county: Nottinghamshire
- Region: East Midlands
- Country: England
- Sovereign state: United Kingdom
- Post town: NOTTINGHAM
- Postcode district: NG23
- Police: Nottinghamshire
- Fire: Nottinghamshire
- Ambulance: East Midlands
- UK Parliament: Newark

Little Carlton is a hamlet in the Newark and Sherwood district of Nottinghamshire, England, north-west of Newark-on-Trent. Little Carlton was recorded in the Domesday Book in 1086.

== History ==
=== Middle Ages ===
Little Carlton was originally a medieval village and part of the meadow field system. At the time of its first entry in the Domesday Book, the village was owned by the Archbishop of York. This entry in the book also documents a mill, 66 acres of meadow and 80 acres of underwood. During this time, the village was referred to as "Carleton", "South Carlton" or "Carlton by Newark". In 1180, the village was recorded as being called Karlet or Karletun; in 1278 as Sutkarleton; in 1332 as South Carlton Juxta Bathele and in 1425 as Lytel Carleton.

The areas of Little Carlton used during the Middle Ages are now only earthworks or buried remains including sunken gulleys. Some rectangular earthworks remain (some of which are believed to be footprints of houses) though continuous ploughing of such areas has led to their degrading.

There is evidence of two medieval ponds in Little Carlton, though only one still holds water. One is a roughly circular indent in the ground which was partially filled in during construction of a house directly to its east; the other (which still holds water) is larger and further to the west, on the north border of one of the medieval field enclosures.

The northernmost of these enclosures features more gulleys along with a series of ridges resembling cultivation strips, however, slight differences in their shape (namely having flat tops and being straight) lead many to believe they fulfilled a different - unknown - purpose.

=== Second World War ===
During the Second World War, Little Carlton was used to hold prisoners of war at Bathley Lane Farm. Some barns and sheds used for the POW camp that were returned to farming use can still be seen.

== See also ==
- Listed buildings in South Muskham
