= Staythorpe Power Station =

Gas-fired power station in Nottinghamshire, England

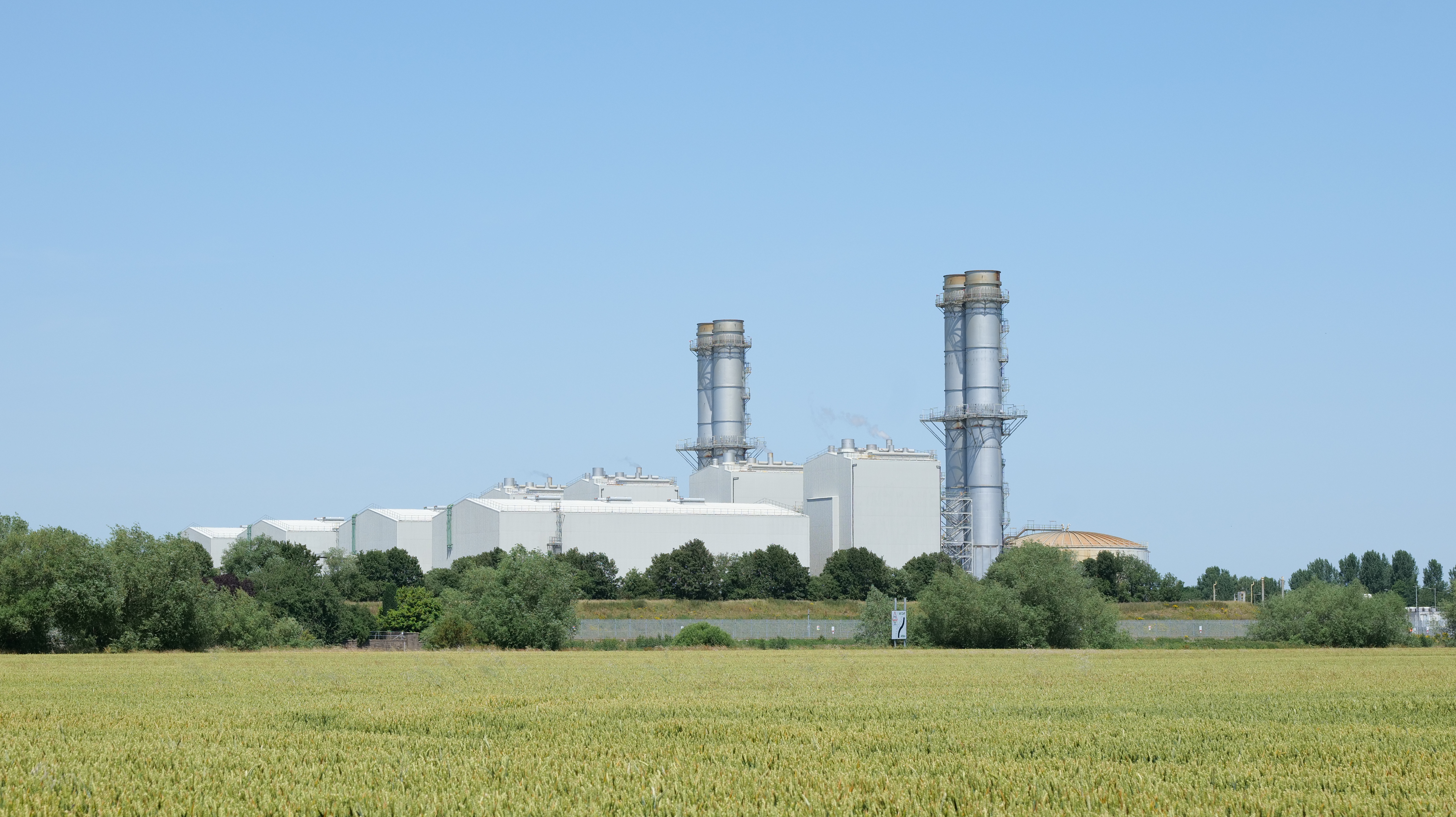
- Staythorpe power station in 2026
- Country: England
- Location: Staythorpe, Nottinghamshire, East Midlands
- Coordinates: 53.07482°N 0.85573°W
- Status: Operational
- Construction began: 2008
- Commission date: 2010
- Construction cost: £600 million
- Owner: RWE AG
- Operators: RWE Generation UK (2010–present)

Thermal power station
- Primary fuel: Natural gas

Power generation
- Nameplate capacity: 1,850 MW

External links
- Commons: Related media on Commons

Staythorpe C Power Station is a 1,735 MWe gas-fired power station at Staythorpe between Southwell and Newark-on-Trent in Nottinghamshire, England, between the River Trent and Nottingham to Lincoln railway line. The station was handed over to the owner RWE Generation UK from Alstom Power with full commercial operation being achieved in December 2010. The official opening ceremony attended by Charles Hendry, Minister of State took place on 9 May 2011.

The £680 million plant is owned by the German energy company, RWE Generation UK. It is the second largest gas-fired power station in the UK and the third largest in Europe, by generating capacity, as of 2021. It has an overall efficiency in excess of 58%.

== History ==
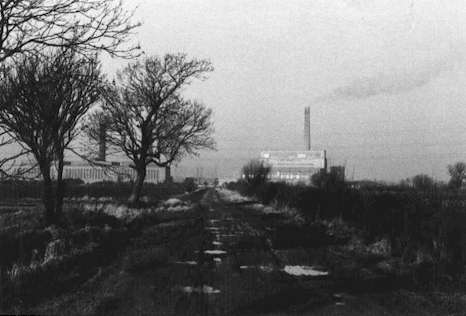
Photograph of Farndon taken in 1973 from the north end of Marsh Lane looking west showing Staythorpe A and B power stations in the distance

Staythorpe C was built on the site of two former CEGB coal-fired power stations, the 360 MW Staythorpe A and the 360 MW Staythorpe B.

=== Staythorpe A (1950–1983) ===
Staythorpe A was authorised in 1946 and commenced by Derbyshire and Nottinghamshire Electric Power Company. In 1948, electricity supply was nationalised, and the station became the responsibility of the British Electricity Authority (1948-1955) then the Central Electricity Authority (1955-1957) and finally the Central Electricity Generating Board (1958-1990). Staythorpe A was first commissioned in March 1950. It had six 60 MW British Thomson-Houston turbo-alternators giving a gross capability of 360 MW and a net generating capability of 336 MW. The second set was commissioned in July 1950, followed by the other units in April 1952, December 1953, December 1955 and August 1956. The 16 coal-fired Babcock and Wilcox CTM Highhead spreader stoker boilers produced a maximum of 480 kg (1,060 lb) per second of steam delivered to the turbines at 62.1 bars (901 psi) and 482 °C (900 °F). Cooling of the station was by river water. The station had three chimneys.The architect was T. Cecil Howitt FRIBA and the consulting engineers Balfour, Beatty & Co Ltd.

The electricity output, in GWh, is shown in the graph and the installed capacity and output of the power station are shown in the table.

Electricity output, in GWh

Staythorpe A electricity capacity and output
Year	1954	1955	1956	1957	1958	1961	1962	1963	1967	1971	1979	1981	1982
Installed capacity, MW	224	224	284	336	336	336	336	360	360	360	360	336	112
Electricity output, GWh	963.651	1,406	1,531	1,782	2,079	1,731	1,718	1,692	1,515	854	282	98	35

The station was closed on 31 October 1983 and had a generating capacity of 112 ;MW.

=== National Grid history ===
On 15 July 1953, the first 42-mile (68 km) 275 kW line was switched on to West Melton. The transmission line acquired planning permission in February 1950. Construction began around June 1950, with four pylons per mile. Each pylon was 90 ft (27 m) high, and 120 ft (37 m) wide. The line of pylons went through The Dukeries.

The pylons had been tested for six months in a laboratory in Leatherhead in Surrey, of the BEA. For the first time, the pylons carried a double circuit.

The 275 kW pylon route went through Wellow, Nottinghamshire, Bothamsall, west of Barnby Moor, passes to the south-west of Blyth, Nottinghamshire, entering South Yorkshire at Styrrup with Oldcotes, then passes south of Stainton, South Yorkshire, Braithwell.

The 140-ton transformer for Staythorpe left BTH, at Rugby, in January 1953, to travel 70 miles (110 km). It travelled through Leicester.

=== Staythorpe B (1962–1994) ===
Staythorpe B was commissioned in May 1962 by the Central Electricity Generating Board. It had three 120 MW Metropolitan Vickers turbo-alternators giving a gross generating capability of 360 MW and a net capability of 336 MW. The John Brown pulverised fuel boilers produced a maximum of 324 kg (714 lb) per second of steam delivered to the turbines at 103.4 bars (1,500 psi) and 538 °C (1,000 °F). Staythorpe B was one of the CEGB’s twenty steam power stations with the highest thermal efficiency; the thermal efficiency was 33.28 per cent in 1963–1964, 33.54 per cent in 1964–1965, and 33.83 per cent in 1965–1966. Cooling of the station was by river water and cooling towers constructed by Davenport Engineering. The station had a single chimney. The annual electricity output of Staythorpe B was:

Electricity output of Staythorpe B
Year	1960–61	1961–62	1962–63	1963–64	1964–65	1965–66	1966–67	1971–72	1978–79	1980–81	1981–82
Electricity output, GWh	379	1,191	2,438	2,455	2,211	2,192	2,530	2,203	1,967	1,962.6	1,811

Staythorpe B closed in 1994, with a generating capacity of 354 MW.

There is still a large substation next to the site of the former power stations, and a monument. Staythorpe B power station was supplied with coal via a branch off the adjacent Nottingham and Lincoln railway line. Rail facilities included a west-facing junction on the mainline, eleven sidings, a coal hopper, a locomotive shed and a run-round loop.

The cooling water system enabled the abstraction of up to 104,600 m^{3} (23,000,000 imperial gallons) of water per hour from the River Trent.

== Staythorpe C ==
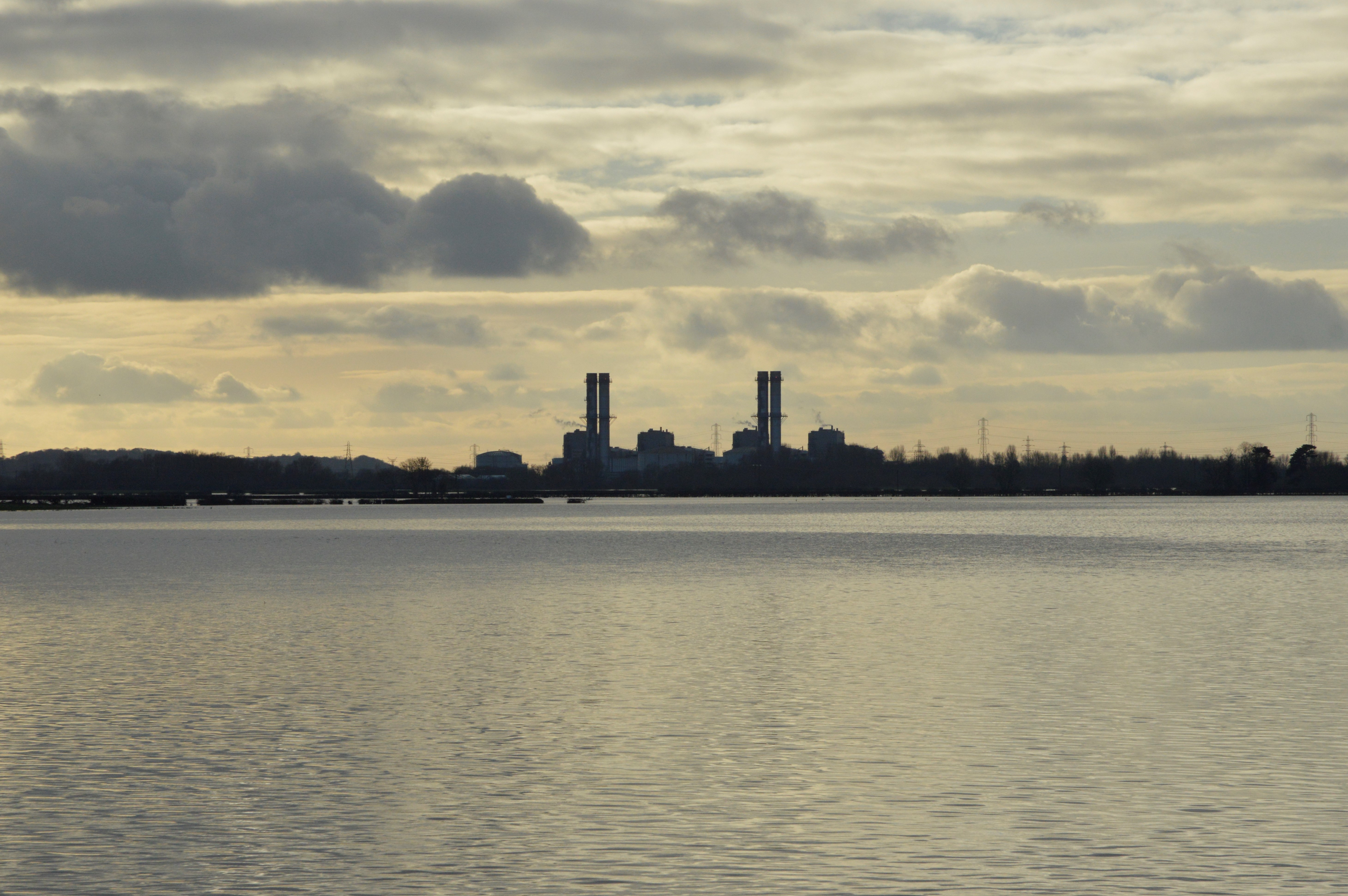
Staythorpe C viewed from the Great North Road in 2024

=== Planning process ===
Planning permission was given for the gas-fired power station as early as 1993, and construction originally began in 1998 by the previous owner National Power, temporarily ceasing in 2000 due to market saturation and low returns on electricity generation (high gas costs versus low electricity prices). Construction restarted in early 2008, after RWE decided to proceed with Staythorpe in May 2007 in preference to development at an alternate site at Pembroke Power Station in Wales. The Pembroke site was given the go ahead to proceed alongside Staythorpe in February 2009 once environmental conditions were assured to be met. The project at Staythorpe will be constructed under an Engineering, procurement and construction (EPC) contract by Alstom Power.

The electricity 400 kV ZA transmission line from Staythorpe to Grendon, Northamptonshire was upgraded for the new power station.

=== Resourcing of construction labour ===
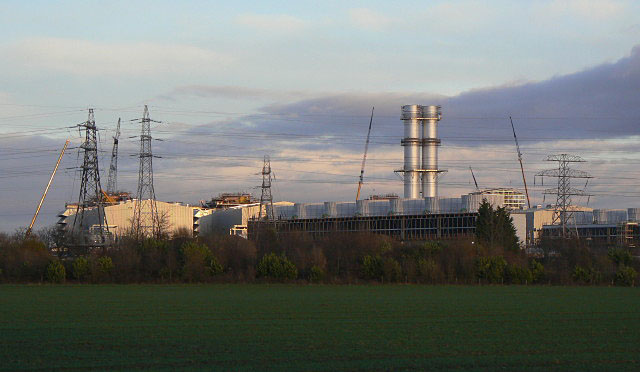
Staythorpe Power Station unit A

The GMB and Unite trade unions demonstrated at the station when Alstom recruited non-UK contract labour to build the power station.

=== Specification ===
Staythorpe is a CCGT power station that runs primarily on natural gas, but has the theoretical (not commissioned) option to switch to (distillate) light fuel oil. It was designed to generate enough electricity for two million homes with four KA26-1 modules each generating around 430 MWe, each with an Alstom 288 MWe GT26B gas turbine, triple-pressure heat recovery steam generator and steam turbine. Electricity is generated using Alstom TOPGAS hydrogen-cooled generators. The plant was designed for a thermal efficiency of around 58%.
