= John Smeaton =

English engineer (1724–1792)

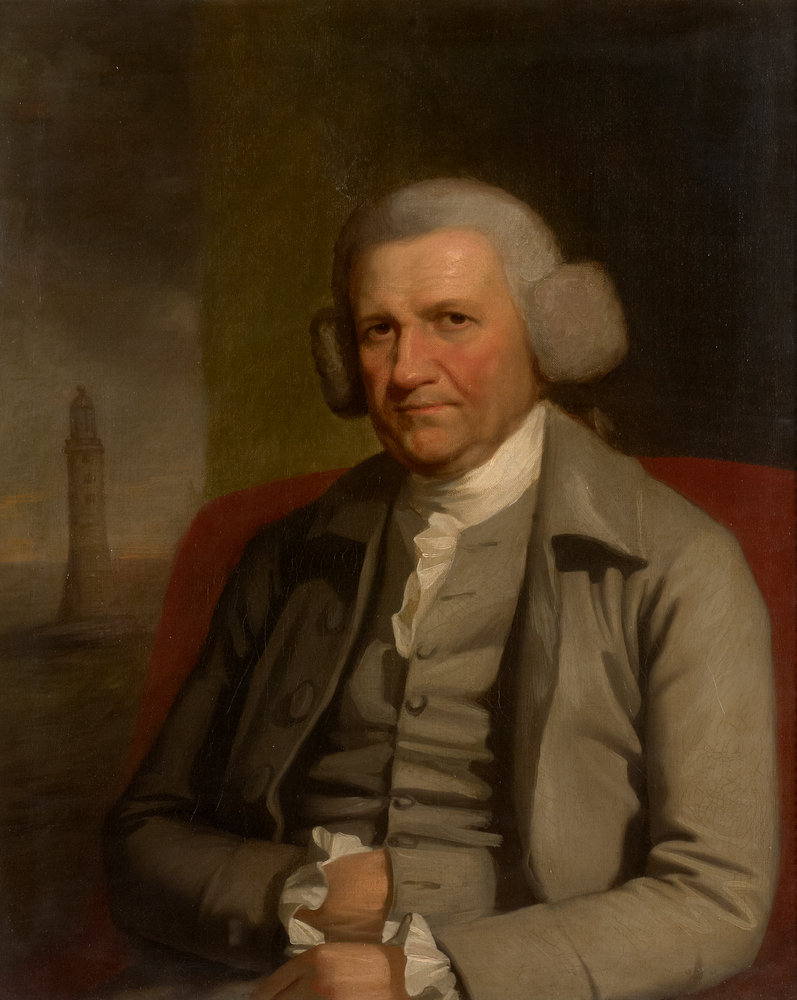
- Portrait by Mather Brown
- Born: 8 June 1724; Austhorpe, West Riding of Yorkshire
- Died: 28 October 1792 (aged 68); Austhorpe, West Riding of Yorkshire
- Resting place: St Mary's Church, Whitkirk
- Occupation: Civil engineer
- Awards: Copley Medal (1759)

John Smeaton (8 June 1724 – 28 October 1792) was an English civil engineer responsible for the design of bridges, canals, harbours and lighthouses. He was also a capable mechanical engineer and an eminent scholar, who introduced various scientific methodologies into engineering. Smeaton was the first self-proclaimed "civil engineer", and is often regarded as the "father of civil engineering". He pioneered the use of hydraulic lime in concrete, using pebbles and powdered brick as aggregate. Smeaton was associated with the Lunar Society.

== Law and physics ==
Smeaton was born in Austhorpe, Leeds, England. After studying at Leeds Grammar School he joined his father's law firm, but left to become a mathematical instrument maker (working with Henry Hindley), developing, among other instruments, a pyrometer to study material expansion. In 1750, his premises were in the Great Turnstile in Holborn.

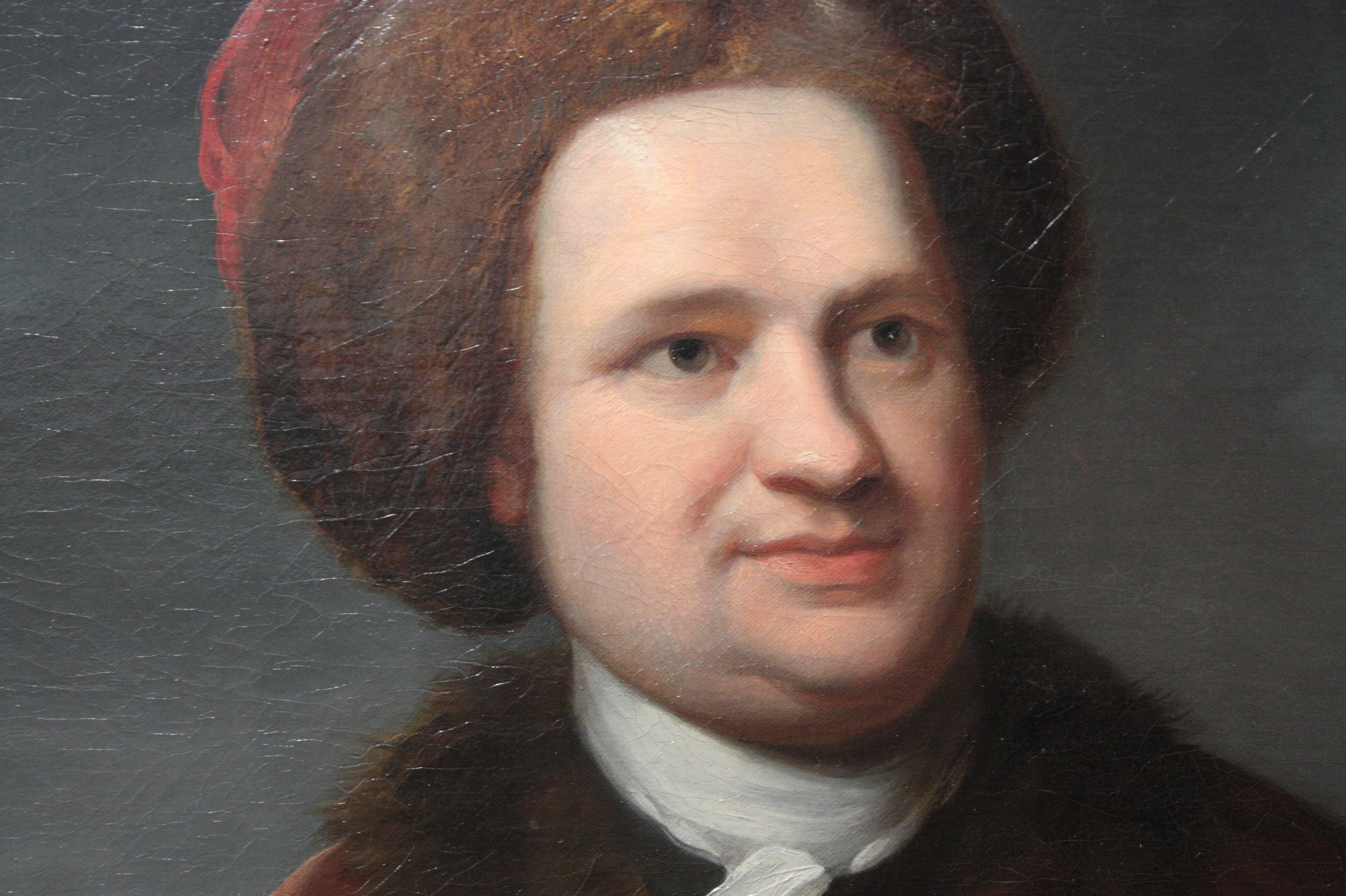
John Smeaton by George Romney, 1779 (detail), National Portrait Gallery, London

He was elected a Fellow of the Royal Society in 1753 and in 1759 won the Copley Medal for his research into the mechanics of waterwheels and windmills. His 1759 paper "An Experimental Enquiry Concerning the Natural Powers of Water and Wind to Turn Mills and Other Machines Depending on Circular Motion" addressed the relationship between pressure and velocity for objects moving in air (Smeaton noted that the table doing so was actually contributed by "my friend Mr Rouse" "an ingenious gentleman of Harborough, Leicestershire" and calculated on the basis of Rouse's experiments), and his concepts were subsequently developed to devise the 'Smeaton Coefficient'. Smeaton's water wheel experiments were conducted on a small scale model with which he tested various configurations over a period of seven years. The resultant increase in efficiency in water power contributed to the Industrial Revolution.

Over the period 1759–1782 he performed a series of further experiments and measurements on water wheels that led him to support and champion the vis viva theory of German Gottfried Leibniz, an early formulation of conservation of energy. This led him into conflict with members of the academic establishment who rejected Leibniz's theory, believing it inconsistent with Sir Isaac Newton's conservation of momentum.

== Smeaton coefficient ==
In his 1759 paper "An Experimental Enquiry Concerning the Natural Powers of Water and Wind to Turn Mills and Other Machines Depending on Circular Motion" Smeaton developed the concepts and data which became the basis for the Smeaton coefficient, the lift equation used by the Wright brothers. It has the form:

$$L = k V^2 A C_l \,$$

where:

$L$ is the lift
$k$ is the Smeaton coefficient (see note below)
$V$ is the velocity
$A$ is the area in square feet
$C_l$ is the lift coefficient (the lift relative to the drag of a plate of the same area)

The Wright brothers determined with wind tunnels that the Smeaton coefficient value of 0.005 was incorrect and should have been 0.0033. In modern analysis, the lift coefficient is normalised by the dynamic pressure instead of the Smeaton coefficient.

== Civil engineering ==
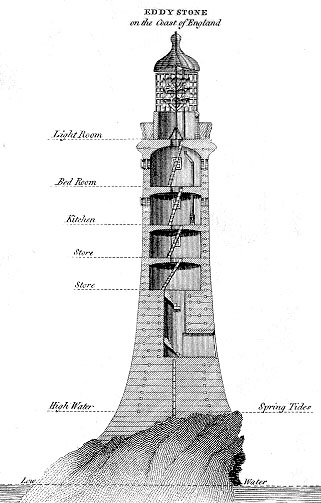
Smeaton's Lighthouse

Smeaton is important in the history, rediscovery of, and development of modern cement, identifying the compositional requirements needed to obtain "hydraulicity" in lime; work which led ultimately to the invention of Portland cement. Portland cement led to the re-emergence of concrete as a modern building material, largely due to Smeaton's influence.

Recommended by the Royal Society, Smeaton designed the third Eddystone Lighthouse (1755–59). He pioneered the use of 'hydraulic lime' (a form of mortar that will set under water) and developed a technique involving dovetailed blocks of granite in the building of the lighthouse. In designing the lighthouse, Smeaton combined different types of knowledge from separate fields, including geology, electrical research, meteorology, and classical learning.

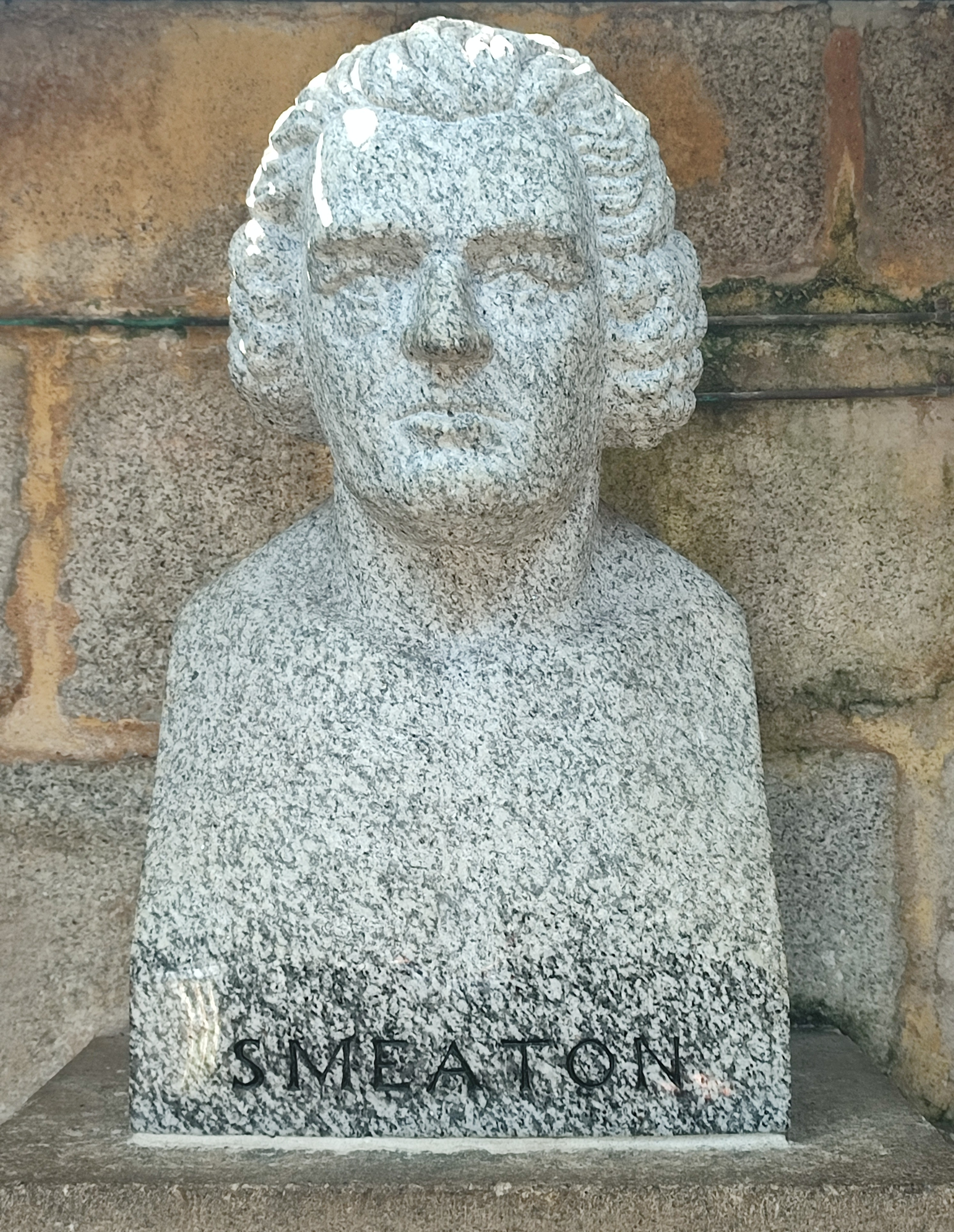
Granite bust by Philip Chatfield in Smeaton's Tower Plymouth

His lighthouse remained in use until 1877 when the rock underlying the structure's foundations had begun to erode; it was dismantled and partially rebuilt at Plymouth Hoe where it is known as Smeaton's Tower. In 2020 a Cornish granite bust of Smeaton by Philip Chatfield, commissioned by The Box, Plymouth, and funded by Trinity House, was installed in the tower's lantern chamber before its reopening. The bust is based on a plaster one donated by the Institution of Civil Engineers in about 1980, but later removed for safety reasons.

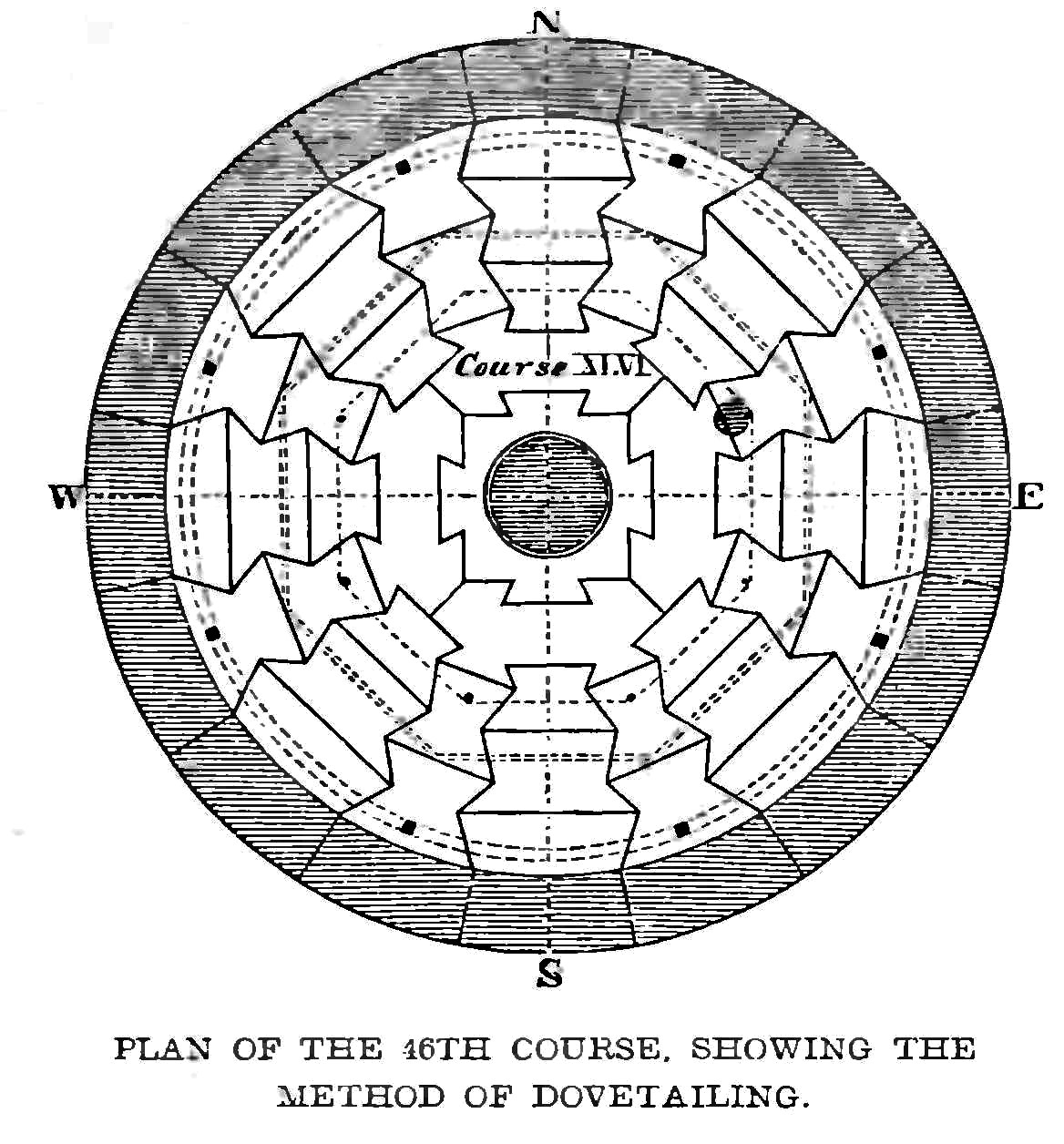
Cross section of the Eddystone Lighthouse showing the method of dovetailing

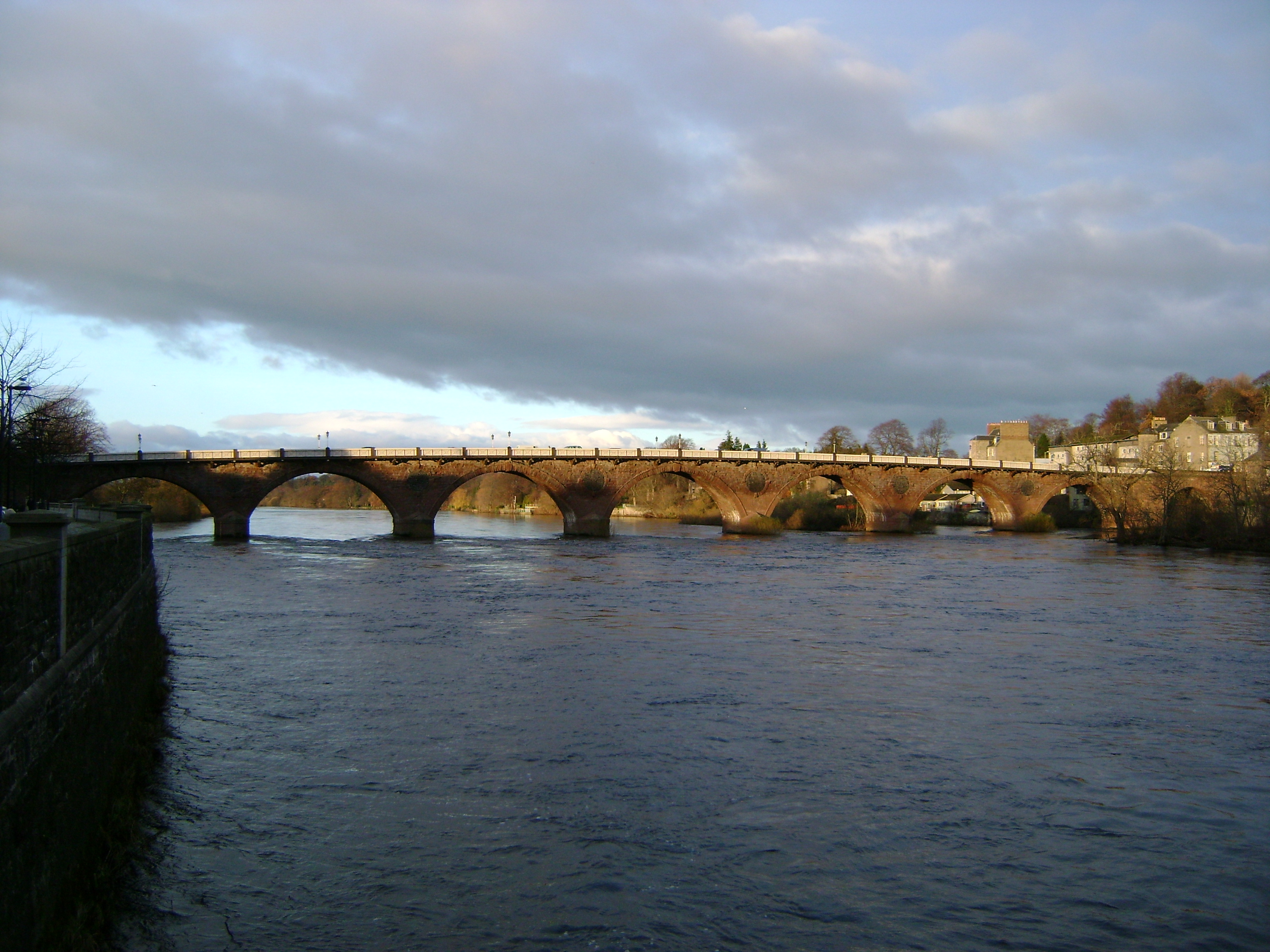
Perth Bridge, over the Tay

Deciding that he wanted to focus on the lucrative field of civil engineering, he commenced an extensive series of commissions, including:

- the Calder and Hebble Navigation (1758–70)
- Coldstream Bridge over the River Tweed (1763–66)
- Improvements to the River Lee Navigation (1765–70)
- Smeaton's Pier in St Ives, Cornwall (1767–70)
- Perth Bridge over the River Tay in Perth (1766–71)
- Ripon Canal (1766–1773)
- Smeaton's Viaduct, which carries the A616 road (part of the original Great North Road) over the River Trent between Newark and South Muskham in Nottinghamshire (1768–70)
- the Forth and Clyde Canal from Grangemouth to Glasgow (1768–77)
- Langley on Tyne smelt mill, with Nicholas Walton, acting as receivers to the Greenwich Hospital, London (1768)
- Banff harbour (1770–75)
- Lower North Water Bridge (1770–75)
- Aberdeen bridge (1775–80)
- Peterhead harbour (1775–1881)
- Nent Force Level (1776–77)
- Cardington Bridge (1778)
- Harbour works at Ramsgate (retention basin 1776–83; jetty 1788–1792)
- Hexham Bridge (1777–90); completed by Robert Mylne in 1793
- the Birmingham and Fazeley Canal (1782–89)
- St Austell's Charlestown harbour in Cornwall (1792)

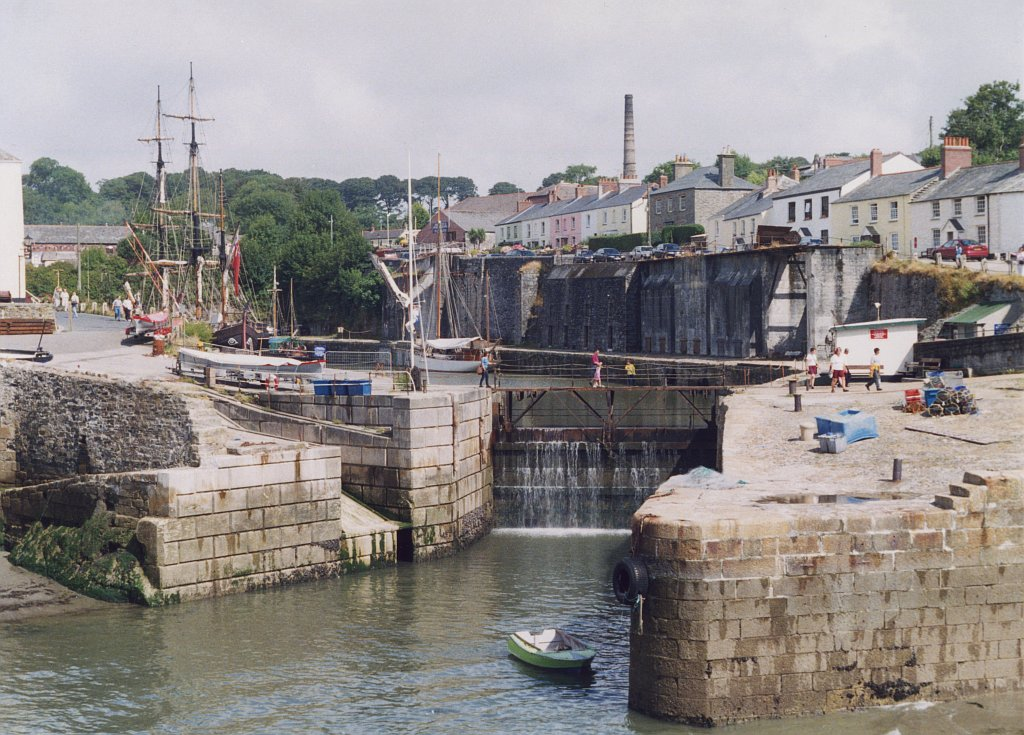
The impounded harbour at Charlestown, Cornwall

Smeaton is considered to be the first expert witness to appear in an English court. Because of his expertise in engineering, he was called to testify in court for a case related to the silting-up of the harbour at Wells-next-the-Sea in Norfolk in 1782. He also acted as a consultant on the disastrous 63-year-long New Harbour at Rye, designed to combat the silting of the port of Winchelsea. The project is now known informally as "Smeaton's Harbour", but despite the name his involvement was limited and occurred more than 30 years after work on the harbour commenced. It closed in 1839.

== Mechanical engineer ==
Employing his skills as a mechanical engineer, he devised a water engine for the Royal Botanic Gardens at Kew in 1761 and a watermill at Alston, Cumbria in 1767 (he is credited by some with inventing the cast-iron axle shaft for water wheels). In 1782 he built the Chimney Mill at Spital Tongues in Newcastle upon Tyne, the first 5-sailed smock mill in Britain. He also improved Thomas Newcomen's atmospheric engine, erecting one at Chacewater mine, Wheal Busy, in Cornwall in 1775 which was both highly efficient and the most powerful at the time.

In 1789 Smeaton applied an idea by Denis Papin, by using a force pump to maintain the pressure and fresh air inside a diving bell. This bell, built for the Hexham Bridge project, was not intended for underwater work, but in 1790 the design was updated to enable it to be used underwater on the breakwater at Ramsgate Harbour. Smeaton is also credited with explaining the fundamental differences and benefits of overshot versus undershot water wheels. Smeaton experimented with the Newcomen steam engine and made marked improvements around the time James Watt was building his first engines (c. late 1770s).

== Legacy ==
Smeaton died after suffering a stroke while walking in the garden of his family home at Austhorpe, and was buried in the parish church at Whitkirk, West Yorkshire. His surviving daughters erected a memorial to him and his wife which is on the chancel wall of the church.

Due to the decay of the rock beneath the Eddystone Lighthouse the structure needed to be replaced. When the upper section of Smeaton's lighthouse (which included the lantern, store and living and watch room) was about to be removed, it was suggested that some of it be brought to Whitkirk and set up as a memorial to him. Unfortunately, the project was deemed too expensive as it was estimated that it would cost around £1800.

He is highly regarded by other engineers, having contributed to the Lunar Society and founded the Society of Civil Engineers in 1771. He coined the term civil engineers to distinguish them from military engineers graduating from the Royal Military Academy at Woolwich. The Society was a forerunner of the Institution of Civil Engineers, established in 1818, and was renamed the Smeatonian Society of Civil Engineers in 1830. His pupils included canal engineer William Jessop and architect and engineer Benjamin Latrobe.

The pioneering constant of proportionality describing pressure varying inversely as the square of the velocity when applied to objects moving in air was named Smeaton's coefficient in his honour. Based on his concepts and data, it was used by the Wright brothers in their pursuit of the first successful heavier-than-air aircraft.

Between 1860 and 1894 the design of the reverse side of the old penny coin showed (behind Britannia) a depiction of Smeaton's Eddystone lighthouse.

Smeaton is one of six civil engineers depicted in the Stephenson stained glass window, designed by William Wailes and unveiled in Westminster Abbey in 1862. A memorial stone commemorating Smeaton himself was unveiled in the Abbey on 7 November 1994, by Noel Ordman, President of the Smeatonian Society of Civil Engineers.

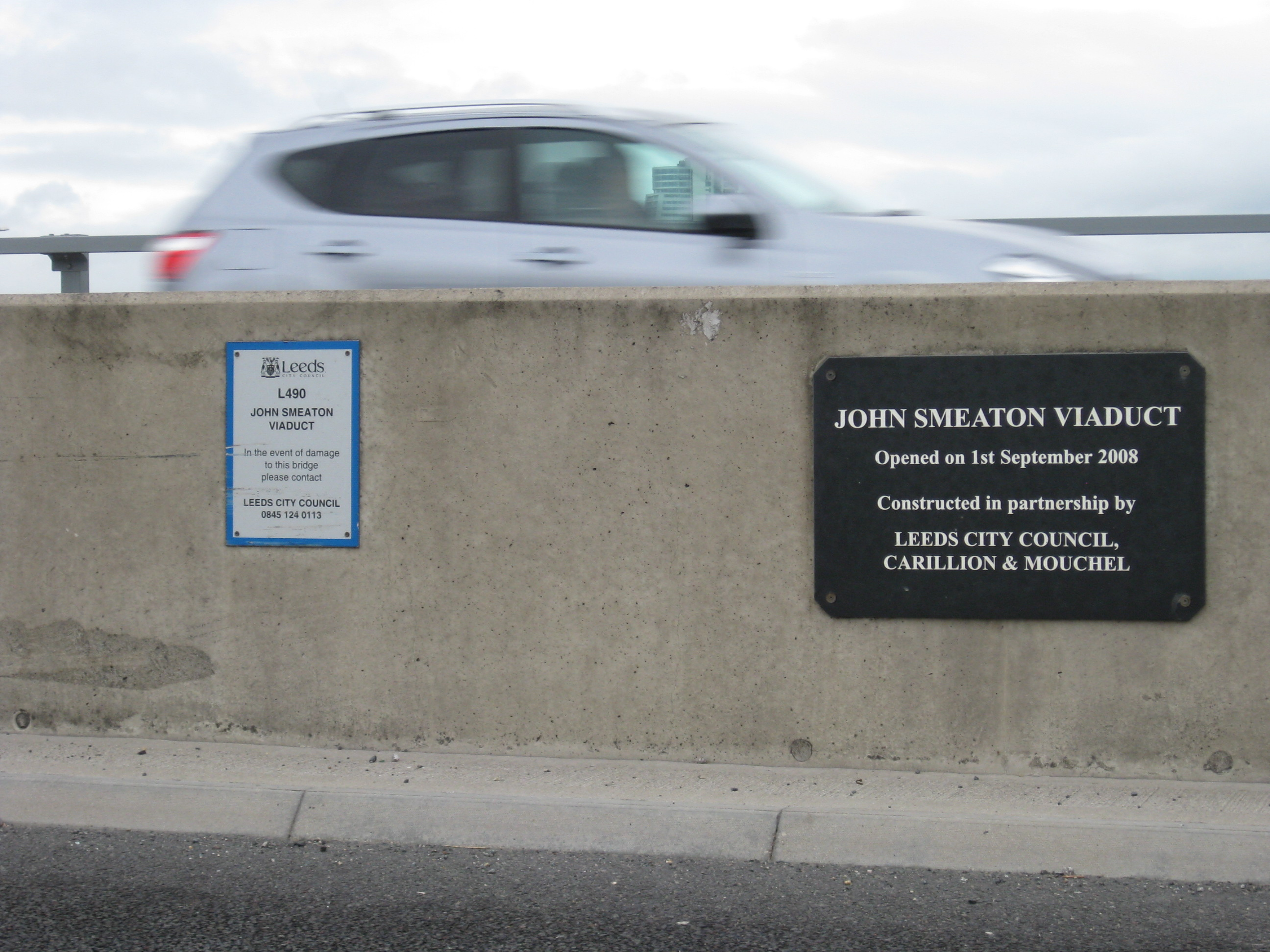
Signs on the John Smeaton Viaduct

John Smeaton Academy, a secondary school in the suburbs of Leeds adjacent to the Pendas Fields estate near Austhorpe, is named after Smeaton. He is also commemorated at the University of Plymouth, where the Mathematics and Technology Department is housed in a building named after him. A viaduct in the final stage of the Leeds Inner Ring Road, opened in 2008, was named after him.

Smeaton is mentioned in the song "I Predict a Riot" (as a symbol of a more dignified and peaceful epoch in Leeds history; and in reference to a Junior School House at Leeds Grammar School, which lead singer Ricky Wilson attended) by the indie rock band Kaiser Chiefs, who are natives of Leeds.

== Works ==
- Experimental enquiry concerning the natural powers of wind and water to turn mills and other machines depending on a circular motion. Paris: Louis Courcier. 1810.
- A Narrative Of The Building And A Description Of The Construction Of The Edystone Lighthouse With Stone. London: H. Hughs. 1791.
- An Account of Some Improvements of the Mariners Compass, in Order to Render the Card and Needle, Proposed by Doctor Knight, of General Use, by John Smeaton, Philosophical Instrument-Maker, Philosophical Transactions of the Royal Society of London, Series I, vol 46 (1749), p. 513-517
- A Letter from Mr. J. Smeaton to Mr. John Ellicott, F. R. S. concerning Some Improvements Made by Himself in the Air-Pump, Philosophical Transactions of the Royal Society of London, Series I, vol 47 (1751), p. 415-428
- An Engine for Raising Water by Fire; Being an Improvement of Savery's Construction, to Render It Capable of Working Itself, Invented by Mr. De Moura of Portugal, F. R. S. Described by Mr. J. Smeaton, Philosophical Transactions of the Royal Society of London, Series, vol 47 (1751), p. 436-438
- A Description of a New Tackle or Combination of Pullies, by Mr. J. Smeaton, Philosophical Transactions of the Royal Society of London, Series I, vol 47 (1751), p. 494-497
- An Account of Some Experiments upon a Machine for Measuring the Way of a Ship at Sea. By Mr. J. Smeaton, F. R. S., Philosophical Transactions of the Royal Society of London, Series I, vol 48 (1753), p. 532-546
- Description of a New Pyrometer, with a Table of Experiments Made Therewith. By Mr. J. Smeaton, F. R. S., Philosophical Transactions of the Royal Society of London, Series I, vol 48 (1753), p. 598-613
- An Account of the Effects of Lightning upon the Steeple and Church of Lestwithiel, Cornwall; In a Letter to the Right Honourable the Earl of Macclesfield, President of the R.S. By Mr. John Smeaton, F.R.S., Philosophical Transactions of the Royal Society of London, Series I, vol 50 (1757), p. 198-204
- Remarks on the Different Temperature of the Air at Edystone, from That Observed at Plymouth, between the 7th and 14 July 1757. By Mr. John Smeaton, F. R. S., Philosophical Transactions of the Royal Society of London, Series I, vol 50 (1757), p. 488-490
- An Experimental Enquiry concerning the Natural Powers of Water and Wind to Turn Mills, and Other Machines, Depending on a Circular Motion. By Mr. J. Smeaton, F. R. S., Philosophical Transactions of the Royal Society of London, Series I, vol 51 (1759), p. 100-174
- A Discourse concerning the Menstrual Parallax, Arising from the Mutual Gravitation of the Earth and Moon; Its Influence on the Observations of the Sun and Planets; With a Method of Observing It: By J. Smeaton, F. R. S., Philosophical Transactions of the Royal Society of London, Series I, vol 58 (1768), p. 156-169
- Description of a New Method of Observing the Heavenly Bodies out of the Meridian: By J. Smeaton, F. R. S., Philosophical Transactions of the Royal Society of London, Series I, vol 58 (1768), p. 170-173
- Observation of a Solar Eclipse the 4th of June, 1769, at the Observatory at Austhorpe, Near Leeds, in the County of York. By J. Smeaton, F. R. S., Philosophical Transactions of the Royal Society of London, Series I, vol 59 (1769), p. 286-288
- Description of a New Hygrometer: By Mr. John Smeaton, F. R. S., Philosophical Transactions of the Royal Society of London, Series I, vol 61 (1771), p. 198-211
- An Experimental Examination of the Quantity and Proportion of Mechanic Power Necessary to be Employed in Giving Different Degrees of Velocity to Heavy Bodies from a State of Rest. By Mr. John Smeaton, F. R. S., Philosophical Transactions of the Royal Society of London, Series I, vol 66 (1776), p. 450-475
- New Fundamental Experiments upon the Collision of Bodies. By Mr. John Smeaton, F. R. S. in a Letter to Sir Joseph Banks, Bart. P. R. S., Philosophical Transactions of the Royal Society of London, Series I, vol 72 (1782), p. 337-354
- Observations on the Graduation of Astronomical Instruments; With an Explanation of the Method Invented by the Late Mr. Henry Hindley, of York, Clock-Maker, to Divide Circles into any Given Number of Parts. By Mr. John Smeaton, F. R. S.; Communicated by Henry Cavendish, Esq. F. R. S. and S. A., Philosophical Transactions of the Royal Society of London, Series I, vol 76 (1786), p. 1-47
- Account of an Observation of the Right Ascension and Declination of Mercury out of the Meridian, Near His Greatest Elongation, Sept. 1786, Made by Mr. John Smeaton, F. R. S. with an Equatorial Micrometer, of His Own Invention and Workmanship; Accompanied with an Investigation of a Method of Allowing for Refraction in Such Kind of Observations; Communicated to the Rev. Nevil Maskelyne, D. D. F. R. S. and Astronomer Royal, and by Him to the Royal Society, Philosophical Transactions of the Royal Society of London, Series I, vol 77 (1787), p. 318-343
- Description of an Improvement in the Application of the Quadrant of Altitude to a Celestial Globe, for the Resolution of Problems Dependant on Azimuth and Altitude. By Mr. John Smeaton, F. R. S.; Communicated by Mr. William Wales, F. R. S., Philosophical Transactions of the Royal Society of London, Series I, vol 79 (1789), p. 1-6

== See also ==
- Canals of the United Kingdom
- History of the British canal system
