= Averham =

Village and civil parish in Nottinghamshire, England

Coordinates: 53.08°N 0.86°W

- Village and civil parish
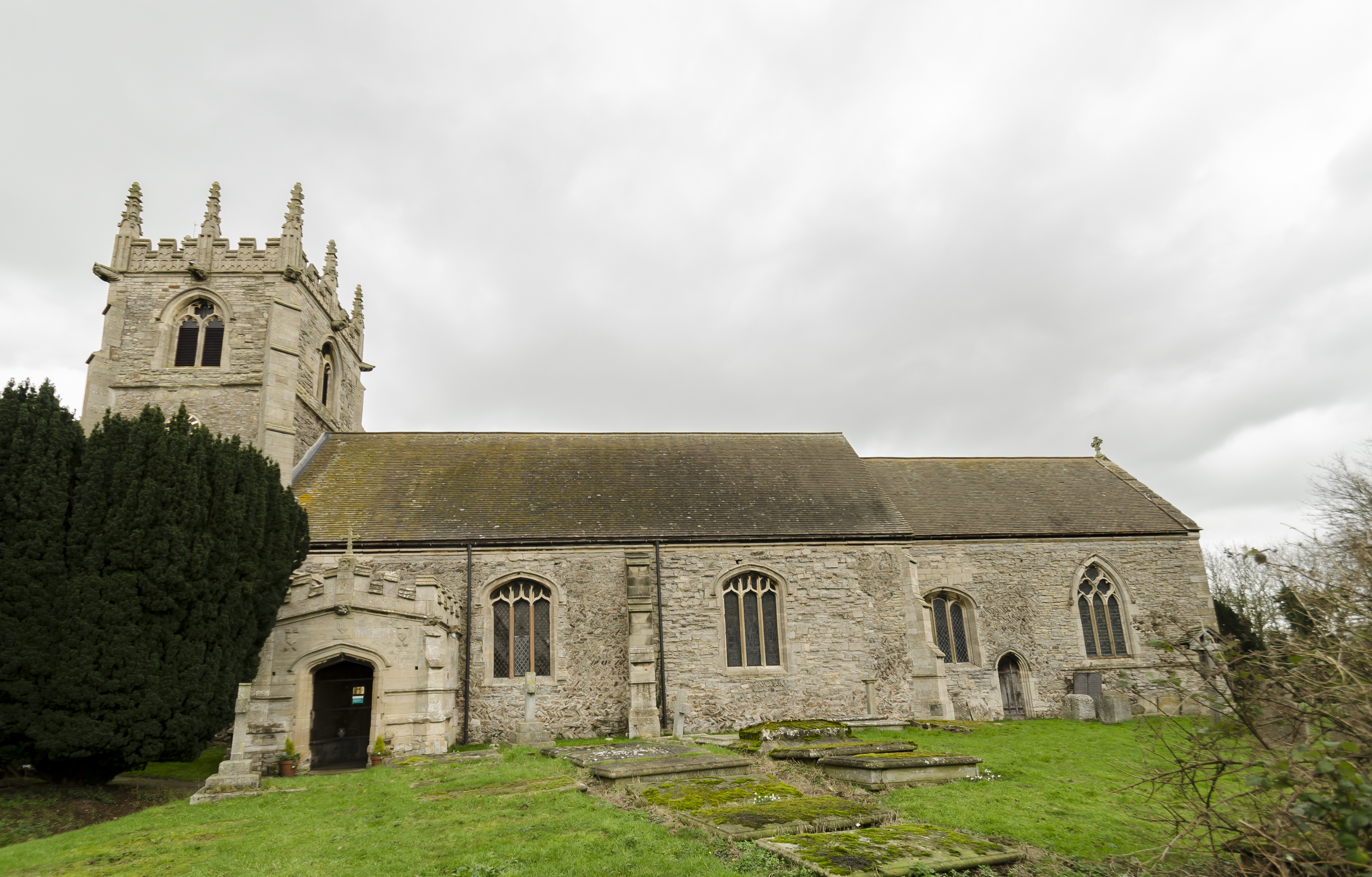
- St.Michael's Church

- Location within Nottinghamshire
- Interactive map of Averham
- Area: 3.27 sq mi (8.5 km^{2})
- Population: 215 (2021)
  - Density: 66/sq mi (25/km^{2})
- OS grid reference: SK 7654
  - London: 110 mi (180 km) SSE
- District: Newark and Sherwood
- Shire county: Nottinghamshire
- Region: East Midlands
- Country: England
- Sovereign state: United Kingdom
- Post town: NEWARK
- Postcode district: NG23
- Dialling code: 01636
- Police: Nottinghamshire
- Fire: Nottinghamshire
- Ambulance: East Midlands
- UK Parliament: Newark
- Website: www.hugofox.com/community/averham-kelham-and-staythorpe-parish-council-15064/your-parish-council/

Averham /ˈɛərəm/ is a village and civil parish in the Newark and Sherwood district of Nottinghamshire, England. According to the 2001 census it had a population of 187, increasing to 294 at the 2011 census (which included Staythorpe), however Averham alone reported 215 residents at the 2021 census. The village is just west of Newark-on-Trent. Staythorpe Power Station is south-west of the village.

== Church ==
Averham is the location of Church of St. Michael and All Angels, Averham, which is a Grade I listed building.

== Theatrical tradition ==
For many decades, the village has been famous locally for the Robin Hood Theatre. The 150-seat theatre was designed by built Reverend Joseph Cyril Walker and built on the grounds of Averham Rectory, in 1913, by the village carpenter, Robert Lee. Its original name was Robin Hood Opera House. The Youth section of the Robin Hood Theatre has become an important part of its function, and performs regularly in the Nottingham And Nottinghamshire Drama Association Festival.

The theatre closed in 1951, then reopened 1n 1961 as a public theatre under a charitable trust. After a financial struggle, the County Council took over the trusteeship in 1981. In 2007, the theatre was closed by the county because of safety concerns.

In 2014, the theatre group, which had been performing in schools and village halls, announced that they had raised more than £50,000 toward renovation of the theatre. Contributors include Ian McKellen, Judi Dench, and Sylvia Syms.

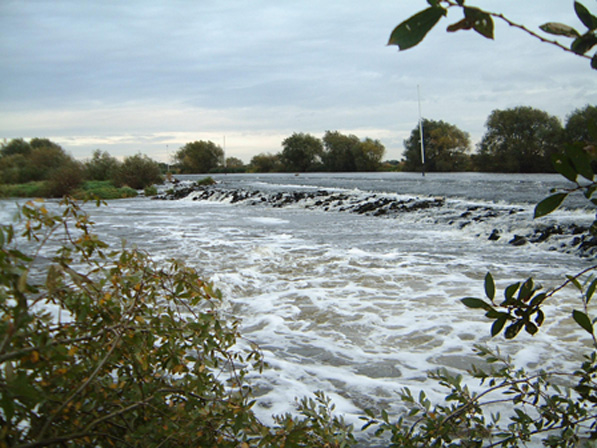
Averham weir at high water

== See also ==
- Listed buildings in Averham
