= Andrew Miller (engraver) =

English mezzotint engraver

- Born: c. 1717
- Died: September 1763 (aged c. 46); Dublin, Ireland

Andrew Miller (c. 1717 - September 1763) was an English mezzotint engraver.

== Life ==
Miller was reputedly born in London, from a Scottish background. He was a pupil of John Faber the younger, and the earliest date on his own plates is 1737.

After working for some years in London, Miller went to Dublin and settled there. He was invited to do so by John Brooks and they initially worked together, trying to break a London monopoly on mezzotint engraving. Together they had a strong group of pupils—James McArdell, Richard Houston, Richard Purcell, and Charles Spooner—and the main burden of training them may have been Miller's. In 1746 the "Dublin group" broke up, with Brooks returning to England in company with McArdell and Houston. Miller's Dublin plates, which are dated from 1743 to 1756, were mostly published by himself "on Hog Hill, near the Round Church", and some bear also the address of Michael Ford.

Miller is said to have shortened his life by drinking. He died in Dublin in September 1763.

== Works ==
Miller's portraits numbered more than 60. They included:

- Jonathan Swift, after Francis Bindon (1743);
- Robert Boyle, after Johann Kerseboom;
- Philip Stanhope, 4th Earl of Chesterfield, after William Hoare;
- Prince William, Duke of Cumberland, after Thomas Hudson;
- Queen Elizabeth I;
- David Garrick as Richard III, after William Hogarth;
- John Hampden;
- Archbishop William King, after Charles Jervas;
- John Churchill, Duke of Marlborough, after Godfrey Kneller;
- Joe Miller as Teague, after Charles Stoppelaer;
- Archbishop James Ussher, after Peter Lely;
- John Warburton, after Benjamin Vandergucht; and
- George Whitefield, after M. Jenkin.

An engraving of Charles Lucas, after William Jones, saw Miller in political trouble. Lucas was an opposition figure, and Miller also supported him in print, in the newsletter of James Esdall. In late 1649 the government reacted, and Miller spent some time in Newgate Prison. Some of Miller's portraits are copies of prints by Jacobus Houbraken, George Vertue, and others: he was known for plagiarism. He also produced some subjects after Jacques Courtin, Rosalba Carriera, Paolo Veronese and others.

== Notes ==
Attribution

This article incorporates text from a publication now in the public domain: Lee, Sidney, ed. (1894). "Miller, Andrew". Dictionary of National Biography. Vol. 37. London: Smith, Elder & Co.
