= The Marquis of Granby Relieving a Sick Soldier =

Painting by Edward Penny

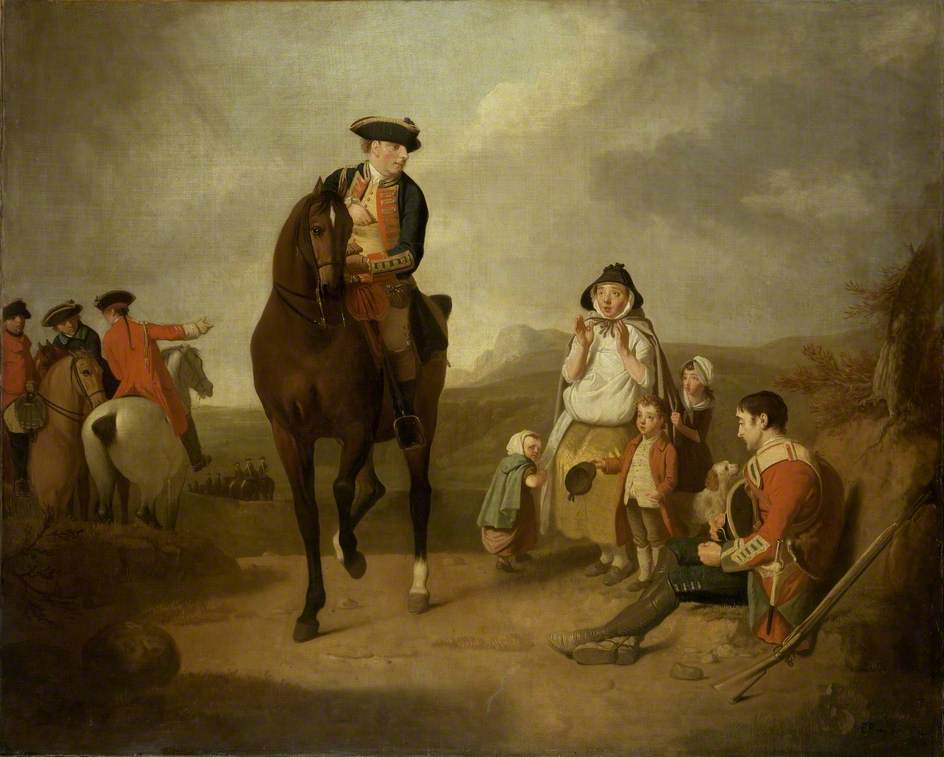
- Artist: Edward Penny
- Year: 1764
- Type: Oil on canvas, history painting
- Dimensions: 101 cm × 127 cm (40 in × 50 in)
- Location: Ashmolean Museum, Oxford

The Marquis of Granby Relieving a Sick Soldier is a 1764 oil painting by the British artist Edward Penny. It depicts a scene on an English roadside where John Manners, Marquess of Granby has reigned in his horse to give alms to an ill-looking veteran soldier with his family. Granby commanded the British contingent during the war in Germany during the Seven Years' War at battles such as Minden and Warburg, and it is implied the soldier man is a veteran of these campaigns.

The painting was displayed at the Exhibition of 1765 staged by the Society of Artists in London. Versions of the painting are now in the Ashmolean Museum in Oxford, the Royal Academy of Arts and the National Army Museum in Chelsea.

== Bibliography ==
- Furneaux, Holly. Military Men of Feeling: Emotion, Touch, and Masculinity in the Crimean War. Oxford University Press, 2016.
- Hoock, Holger. Empires of the Imagination: Politics, War, and the Arts in the British World, 1750–1850. Profile Books, 2010.
- McNairn, Alan. Behold the Hero: General Wolfe and the Arts in the Eighteenth Century. McGill-Queen's Press, 1997
- Shaw, Phillip. Suffering and Sentiment in Romantic Military Art. Routledge, 2017.
