= Thomas Prior =

Irish writer (1680–1752)

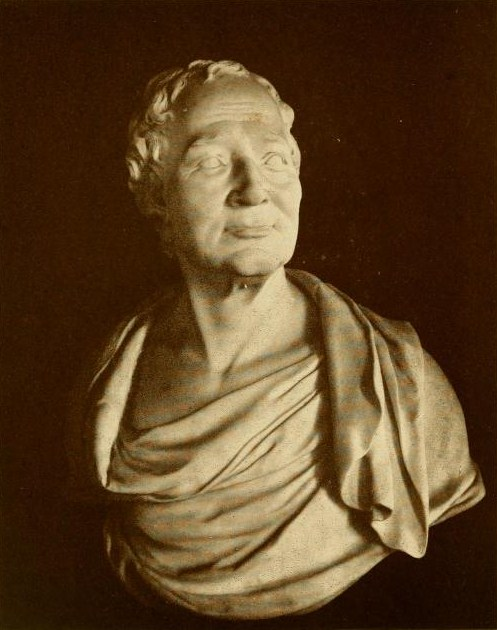
- Bust of Thomas Prior by John van Nost the younger
- Born: 1680; Rathdowney, Ireland
- Died: 21 October 1752 (aged 71–72)
- Education: Trinity College Dublin (BA)
- Known for: Founder of the Royal Dublin Society

Thomas Prior (1680 – 21 October 1751) was an Irish author, known as the founder of the Royal Dublin Society.

== Life ==
He was born at Rathdowney, County Laois, He entered the public school at Kilkenny College in January 1697, and stayed there until April 1699; among his school-fellows was George Berkeley, with whom he formed a lifelong friendship. He entered Trinity College Dublin, obtained a scholarship in 1701, and graduated B.A. in 1703.

In 1729, Prior published his 'List of Absentees of Ireland' which condemned absentee Irish landlords, named those he considered delinquent and garnered himself some notoriety in doing so. Prior subsequently devoted himself to economic promotion, working among the Protestant population in Ireland. With Samuel Madden and eleven other friends, Prior in 1731 established the Dublin Society for the Promotion of Agriculture, Manufactures, Arts, and Sciences, at a meeting of held in Trinity College, 25 June 1731; others involved included Francis Bindon, Patrick Delany, and Sir Thomas Molyneux. It was incorporated, and received a grant from Parliament in 1749 of £500 a year; many years later, in 1820, it renamed itself as the Royal Dublin Society.

Prior died on 21 October 1751, and was buried at Rathdowney, A monument was erected by subscription to his memory in Christ Church Cathedral, Dublin, with an inscription in Latin by Berkeley, who styled him "Societatis Dubliniensis auctor, institutor, curator". A portrait of him in mezzotint by Charles Spooner was published in Dublin in 1752.

== Works ==
In 1729, appeared at Dublin Prior's List of the Absentees of Ireland, and in the following year he published Observations on Coin. To Lord Chesterfield, who had met him as Lord-Lieutenant of Ireland, Prior in 1746 dedicated An Authentic Narrative of the Success of Tar-water in Curing a great number and variety of Distempers. This publication included two letters from Berkeley. An essay by Prior, advocating the encouragement of linen manufacture in Ireland, was published at Dublin in 1749.
