= 71st Regiment of Foot (disambiguation) =

Five regiments of the British Army have been numbered the 71st Regiment of Foot:

- 71st Regiment of Foot (1745), raised in 1745 and disbanded in 1746
- 71st Regiment of Foot (Invalids), raised as the 81st Regiment of Foot in 1758, re-numbered as the 71st Regiment of Foot in 1764 and disbanded in 1769
- 71st Regiment of Foot (1758), raised by re-designation of the 2nd Battalion, 32nd Regiment of Foot in 1758 and disbanded in 1763
- 71st Regiment of Foot, Fraser's Highlanders, raised in 1775 for service in the revolted American colonies and disbanded in 1786
- 71st (Highland) Regiment of Foot, raised in 1777 as the 73rd (Highland) Regiment of Foot (MacLeod's Highlanders) and re-numbered in 1786. They served in India and the Mediterranean, including Gibraltar.
