= Mary Benwell =

British artist (1739–after 1800)

Mary Benwell Codd
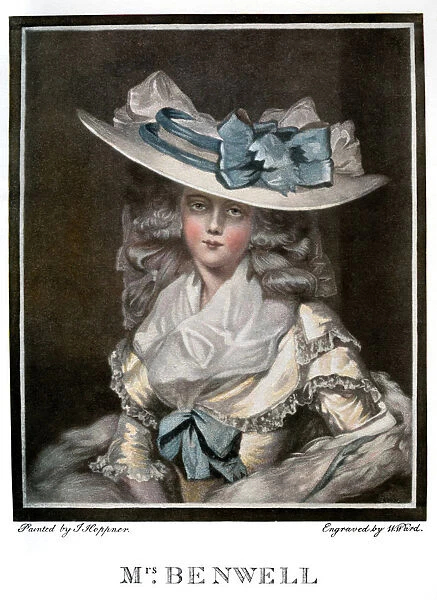
- Born: Mary Benwell; 1739
- Died: unknown, after 1800
- Known for: Miniaturist, Pastel

Mary Benwell (1739–after 1800), married name Codd, was an English artist, a miniaturist and pastellist.

== Life ==
Benell's teachers may have included John Russell or Catherine Read.

Benwell resided in Warwick Court, London, and exhibited crayon portraits and miniatures at the Incorporated Society of Artists and the Royal Academy between the years 1761 and 1791 and at The Society of Artists from 1762 to 1774. She worked also in oil colours and made a reputation in her profession, but she retired from it on her marriage about 1762 with a military officer named Codd (also Coode, Coade).

She was still living in Paddington in 1800.

== Works ==
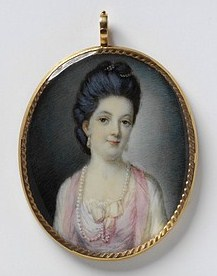
1772 miniature on ivory.

There is a portrait of Queen Charlotte of Mecklenburg-Strelitz, engraved after her by Richard Houston; and another of Miss Brockhurst, by J. Saunders. Other works were The Studious Fair (said to be a portrait of Queen Charlotte), engraved by Charles Spooner, and Cupid Disarmed, engraved by Charles Knight.
