= Abraham Janssen =

Abraham Janssen may refer to:

- Sir Abraham Janssen, 2nd Baronet (c. 1699 – 1765) MP for Dorchester 1720-1722
- Abraham Janssen (chess player) (1720–1795) British chess player

== See also ==
- Abraham Janssens, painter
