= John van Nost the younger =

British sculptor

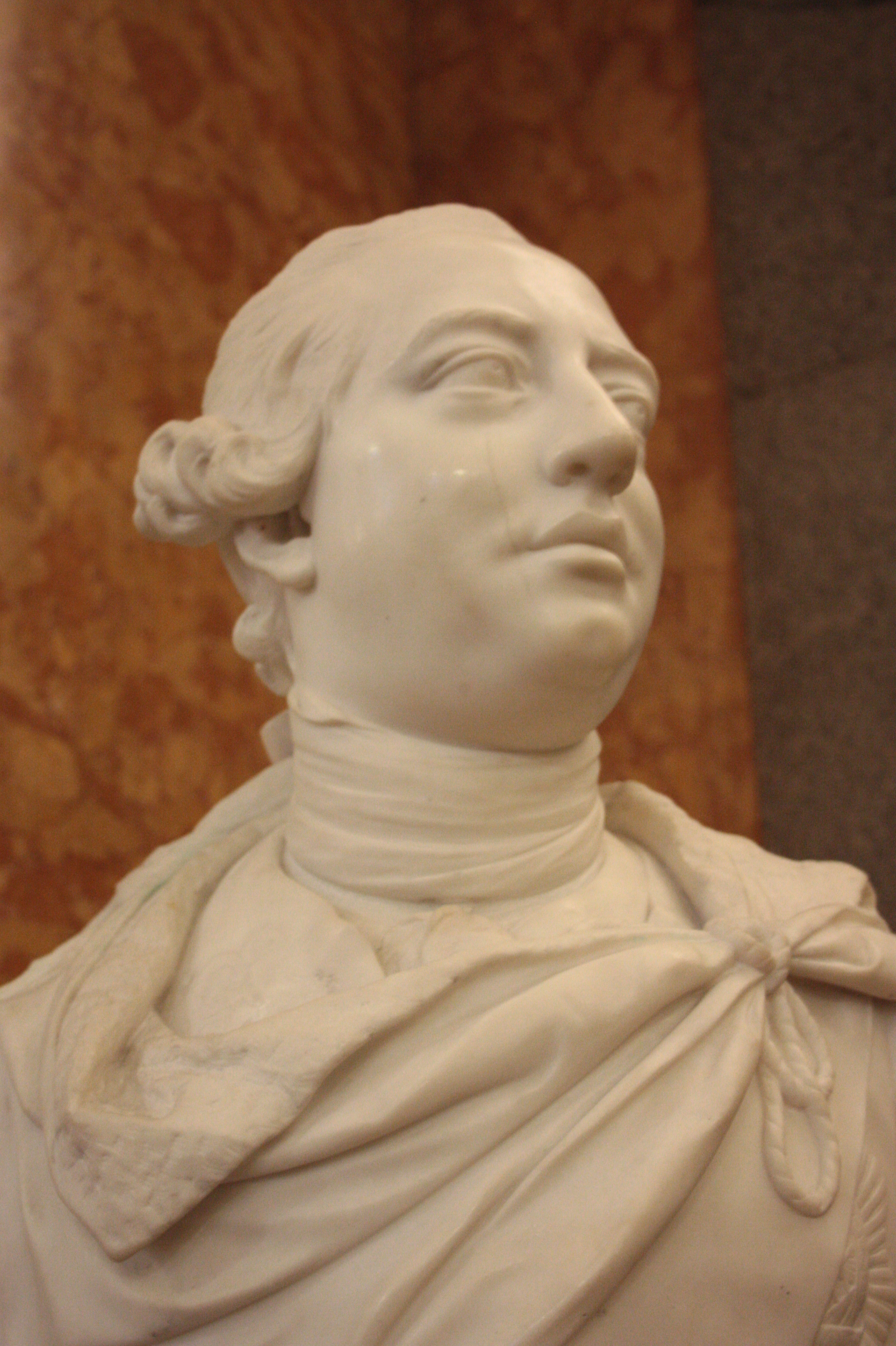
George III by John van Nost the younger, 1764, British Museum

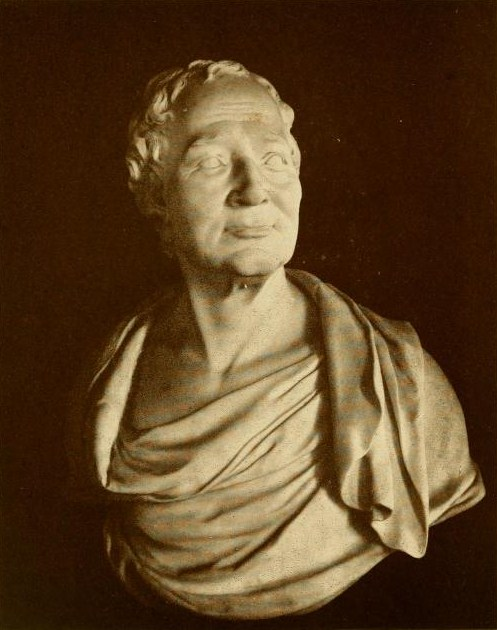
Bust of Thomas Prior by John van Nost the younger

John van Nost the younger (1713–1780) was likely the son or the nephew of the noted Flemish-born British sculptor John van Nost and a noteworthy sculptor in his own right.

== Life ==
He was born around 1712 in Piccadilly, London and was apprenticed to Henry Scheemakers in 1726. It is also highly likely that some training was at the direct hand of his father or uncle. It is probable that they worked together on pieces during his time in London from 1725 to 1729.

Little is known of his time from 1729 to 1749, but it is presumed that he worked in Britain, continuing on his uncle's name and reputation.

In 1750, he moved to Dublin in Ireland and, having little competition, appeared to have had a monopoly of commissions in the area. In 1763, he was known to have a studio in a garden on the south side of St Stephen's Green in Dublin.

He made various trips to London, staying there from 1776 until 1780.

It is likely he died around 1780 in Dublin and he is last recorded living at Mecklenburgh Street.

== Works ==
- Statue of George II, St Stephen's Green (1756) (erected 2 January 1758)
- Statue of George II at the front of Weavers' Hall, Dublin
- Bust of George III (1764) (now in the British Museum)
- Statue of George III, Dublin City Hall (1765) (now in the National Gallery of Ireland)
- Monument to Viscount Loftus, New Ross, County Wexford, Ireland (1768)
- Bust of Thomas Prior
- Bust of Samuel Madden
- Bust of David Garrick (much copied)
- Statue of George, Earl of Bristol, Down Hill, Northern Ireland (1778)
- Often attributed to him is a metal bust of the Prussian king Frederick the Great created by his apprentice Patrick Cunningham, installed in a niche on a house for the renaming of the former Cabragh Lane to Prussia Street in Stoneybatter, Dublin.
