= James Gwim =

Irish artist

- Born: c. 1720; County Kildare, Ireland
- Died: 26 April 1769 (aged 68–69); London, England

James Gwim or Gwinn (c. 1720 - 26 April 1769) was an Irish artist.

== Life ==
James Gwim or Gwinn or Gwin was born in County Kildare around 1700. He first worked as a coach-painter before taking up engraving in Dublin. For a large part of his career he was employed by the Dublin publisher George Grierson. Around 1753, Gwim left Dublin for London where he was employed as a designer of snuff-box lids at the Battersea Enamel Works which was managed by John Brooks.

Gwim is recorded as an eccentric man, who devoted his spare time to study science and mathematics, and lived in seclusion. He lived in lodgings at an alehouse in Westminster, Three Tuns, and later in the Buffalo in Bloomsbury where he shared his lodging with Brooks for a period. He would refuse to leave his room, with a servant leaving his meals at his door. A fellow Irish artist, Charles Spooner, had a bet with Gwim to try to coerce him into leaving his room, during which a fight broke out between them and they both rolled down the stairs. Two weeks after this, on 26 April 1769, Gwim was found dead in his room.

Spranger Barry as Hamlet, watchpaper engraved by Ravenet after Gwim, published by John Smith, London, September 8, 1752 (Folger Shakespeare Library)

== Selected works ==
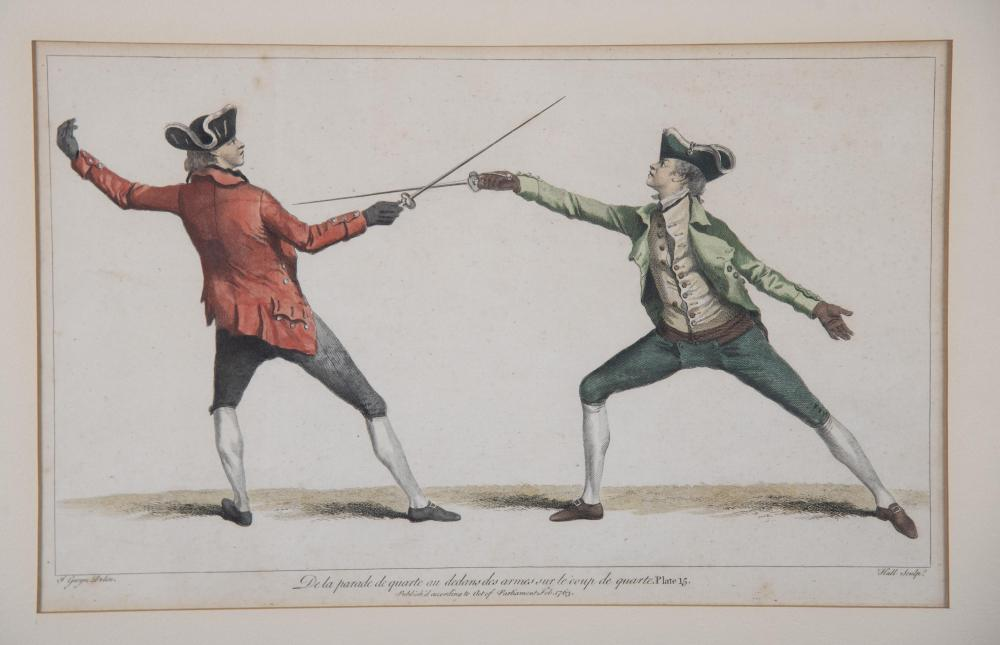
One of a set of four Fencing Scenes, hand coloured engravings, published 1763

- Frontispiece of History of Ecclesiastical Writers by L.E. Du Pin (1723)
- A portrait of Milton for Paradise Lost' (1724)
- Frontispiece of the Book of Common Prayer (1750)
- Frontispiece of the Map of the World for Modern History (1750)
- Portrait of Edward V for Smollett's History of England (1757-65)
