= George Bower =

George Bower may refer to:

- George Bower (footballer) (1884–1964), Australian rules footballer
- George Bower (medallist) (fl. 1664–1689), English medallist
- George Bower (priest) (1748–1800), Archdeacon of Richmond
- George Bower (rugby union) (born 1992), New Zealand rugby player
- George Bower (ironfounder) (1827–1911), English inventor
