= The Gossiping Blacksmith =

Painting by Edward Penny

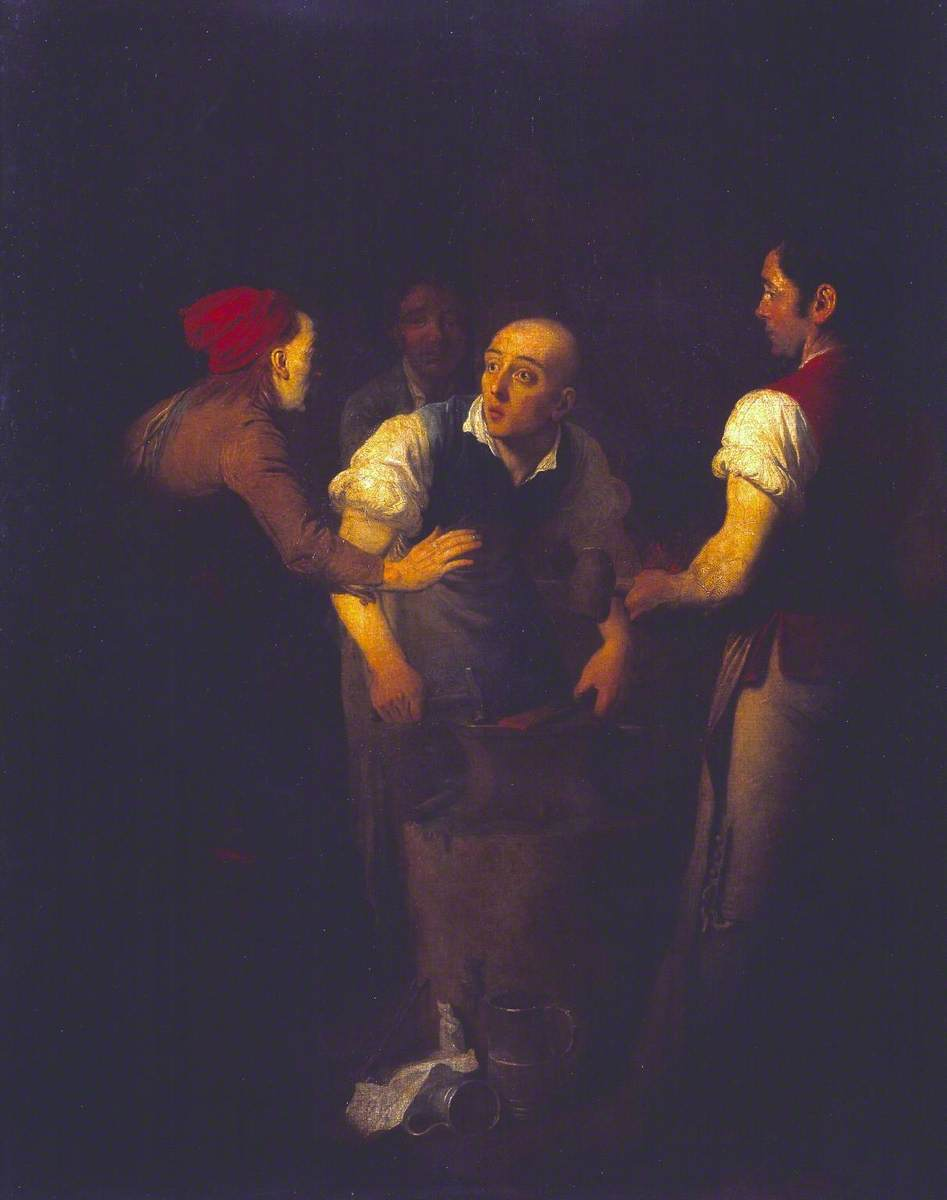
- Artist: Edward Penny
- Year: 1769
- Type: Oil on canvas, genre painting
- Dimensions: 101 cm × 125.7 cm (40 in × 49.5 in)
- Location: Tate Britain, London

The Gossiping Blacksmith is a 1769 oil painting by the British artist Edward Penny. It is inspired by a passage from William Shakespeare's play King John. It depicts a scene where a blacksmith is shown gossiping to his neighbours.

Penny was a founder member of the Royal Academy of Arts and he displayed this painting at the inaugural Royal Academy Exhibition of 1769 held in Pall Mall. The picture is now in the collection of the Tate Britain, having been acquired in 1964. The painting was engraved and became a popular print associated with the Radical supporters of John Wilkes. A mezzotint by Richard Houston based on Penny's painting is held by the British Museum.

== Bibliography ==
- McCormack, Helen. William Hunter and His: Eighteenth-Century Cultural Worlds: The Anatomist and the Fine Arts. Taylor & Francis, 2017.
- Solkin, David H. Painting Out of the Ordinary: Modernity and the Art of Everyday Life in Nineteenth-century Britain. Yale University Press, 2008.
