= Richard Houston =

Irish mezzotint engraver (1721?–1775)

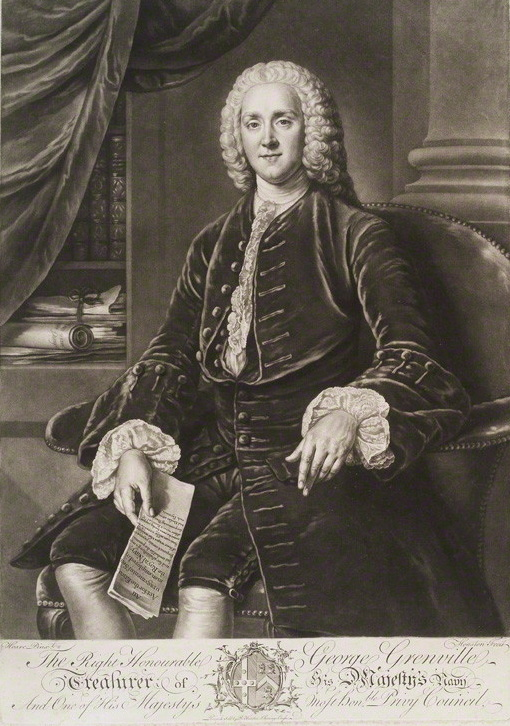
Mezzotint print of George Grenville, after a portrait by William Hoare.

Richard Houston (1721?–1775) was an Irish mezzotint engraver, whose career was mostly in London.

== Life ==
Born in Dublin about 1721, he became a pupil of John Brooks, who was also the master of James McArdell and Charles Spooner. He came to London about 1747, and some of his early plates bear the address "near Drummond's at Charing Cross".

In debt to Robert Sayer the print-seller, he was arrested and confined to the Fleet prison; according to Sayer this in order that he might know where to find the dissipated Houston. He was released in 1760, on the accession of George III. As a free agent he was commissioned by Henry Carrington Bowles.

Houston died in Hetton Street, London, on 4 August 1775, aged 54.

== Works ==
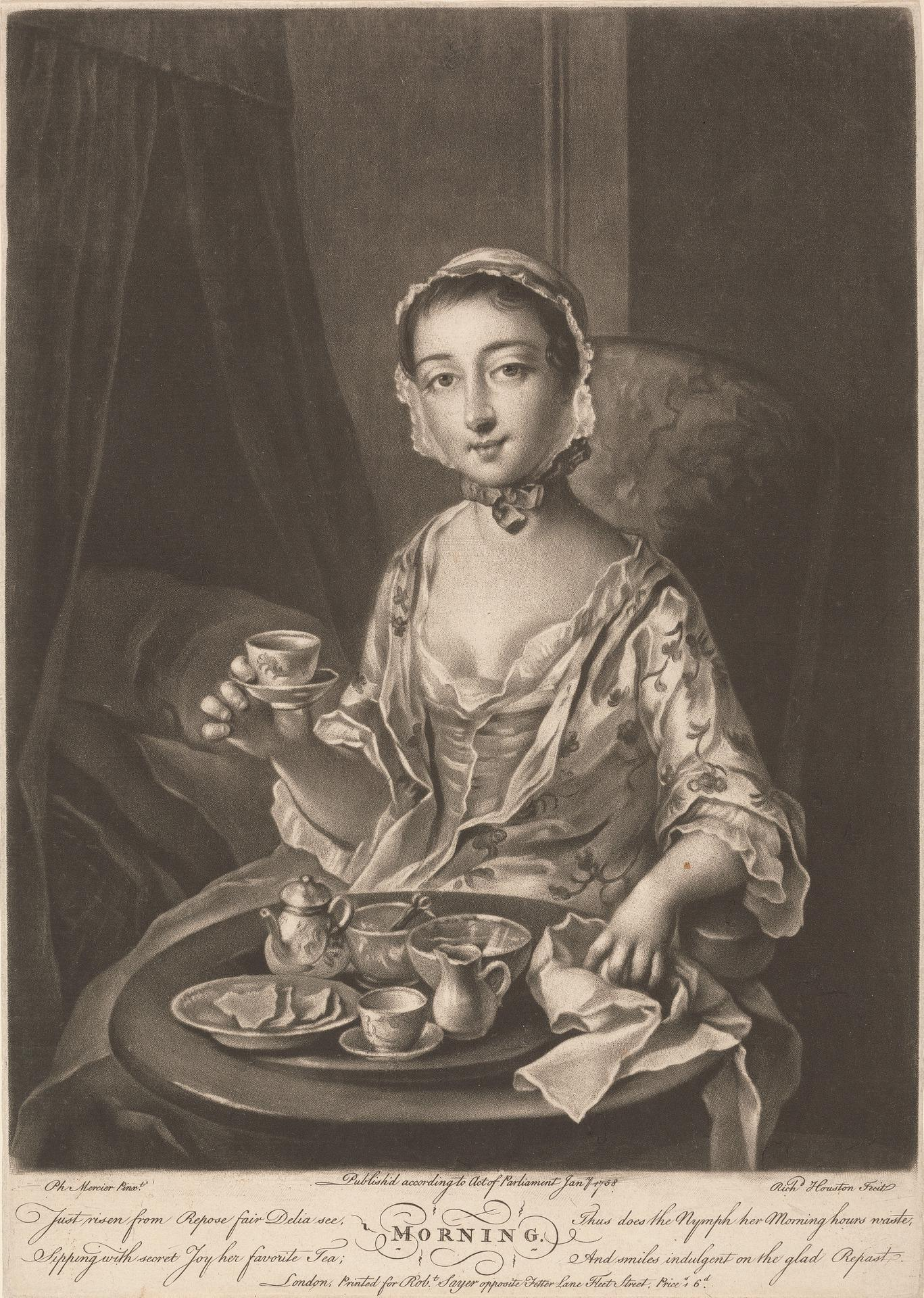
Mezzotint of Morning, from a set

Houston's major works are engravings after Sir Joshua Reynolds, which include portraits of:

- Elizabeth Percy, Duchess of Northumberland, full-length;
- Caroline, Duchess of Marlborough, and child;
- Mary, Duchess of Ancaster;
- Maria, Countess Waldegrave, later Duchess of Gloucester, with her daughter;
- Elisabeth, Duchess of Argyll, and her son;
- Lady Selina Hastings;
- Charles Spencer, 3rd Duke of Marlborough;
- Philip Dormer Stanhope, 4th Earl of Chesterfield; and
- Richard Robinson, archbishop of Armagh.

He engraved also:

- seven portraits of George III, of which four were after Zoffany;
- six of Queen Charlotte of Mecklenburg-Strelitz, after Mary Benwell, Thomas Frye, Zoffany, and others;
- two, after Antoine Pesne, of Frederick II, King of Prussia, one full-length, the other on horseback;
- John Manners, Marquess of Granby, on horseback, after Edward Penny; and full-lengths of
- General Wolfe, after Schaak;
- Pasquale Paoli, after Pietro Gherardi;
- Voltaire, after Sen;
- Julines Beckford, after Nathaniel Dance; and
- Catharine Wodhull and master James Sayer, both after Zoffany.

A series of portraits by him is in Richard Rolt's Lives of the Principal Reformers, London, 1759. Besides portraits, he executed a number of subject plates, such as:

- 'The Virgin and Child,' after Raphael;
- 'The Temptation of St. Anthony,' after Teniers;
- 'The Death of General Wolfe,' after Edward Penny;
- 'The Senses,' five plates after Francis Hayman;
- 'The Sciences,' six plates after Jacopo Amiconi;
- 'Avarice' and 'Innocence,' after Philip Mercier;
- 'The Elements,' four plates, and 'The Times of the Day,' two different sets of four plates, also after Mercier;
- the 'Miraculous Onyx Stone;' and
- plates of running horses, in which he excelled.

Houston's early work included his series of portraits of politicians after William Hoare, as well as plates after Rembrandt. For Bowles he engraved religious figures. He painted a few miniatures.

== Notes ==
Attribution

This article incorporates text from a publication now in the public domain: "Houston, Richard". Dictionary of National Biography. London: Smith, Elder & Co. 1885–1900.
