= John Brooks (engraver) =

Irish mezzotint engraver

- Born: c. 1710; Ireland
- Died: 1756; England, Great Britain

John Brooks (c. 1710 - 1756) was an Irish engraver and inventor, and referred to as the "father of Irish mezzotint tradition".

== Life ==
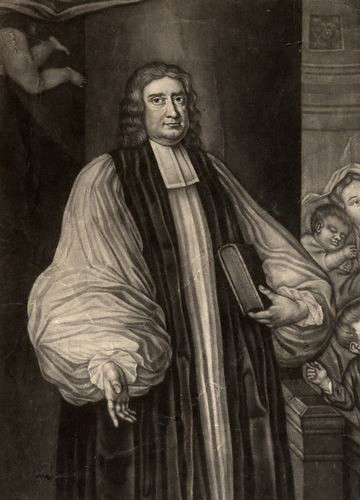
Mezzotint by Brooks of Hugh Boulter, after Francis Bindon.

John Brooks was born circa 1710 in Dublin, the son of John Brooks. The family was possibly of Dutch descent, as van der Brooks, and he may have been related to other printers and printmakers. In 1736, he was admitted as an engraver to the Goldsmiths' Corporation.

Around 1746 he settled in London, managing a business at Battersea for the enamelling of china in colours by a process which he had devised using copper plates to apply designs to enamel objects. The articles produced were ornamented with subjects chiefly from Homer and Ovid. He was unsuccessful in a patent application. After a period of success manufacturing decorated enamel objects such as snuffboxes and étuis known as "Battersea ware", the business folded on the bankruptcy of its chief proprietor, Stephen Theodore Janssen, Lord Mayor of London for 1754–5. He was also associated with James Gwim at this time.

Brooks stayed in London as an engraver and enameller of china, living "rather disreputably in various inns". He died after 1756, and was buried by an innkeeper whom he had led to believe that he was a wealthy man and that the innkeeper would inherit from him.

Some of Brooks' pupils worked as engravers in mezzotint, among them Andrew Miller, Richard Houston, Michael Ford, Charles Spooner, Richard Purcell, and James MacArdell, and he is credited with founding the Anglo-Irish school of mezzotint engraving.

== Career ==
Brooks' first known work was executed in line-engraving at Dublin in 1730, a depiction of the Boyne obelisk as frontispiece of the 1730 Odes and Satyrs of Horace published by Samuel Fuller. The earliest engraved portrait of Peg Woffington is that by Brooks, dated June 1740, at which time he was working from Dick's Coffee House, Skinners Row. Between 1741 and 1746 Brooks produced at Dublin mezzotint portraits and engravings, having learnt the technique in London possibly under John Faber, working from and selling from Sir Isaac Newton's Head on Cork Hill.

A catalogue of his works of Brooks was for the first time published by John Thomas Gilbert, and additions were made by John Chaloner Smith British Mezzotinto Portraits (1878).
