= Memoirs of the Twentieth Century =

1733 speculative fiction by Samuel Madden

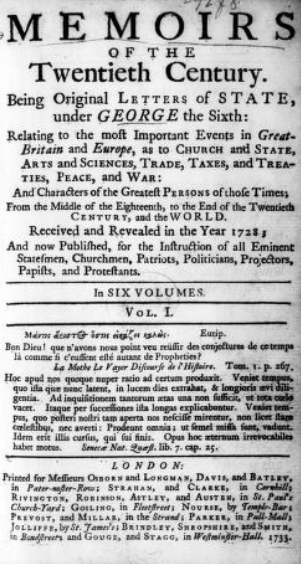
- Title page for Memoirs of the Twentieth Century (1733)
- Author: Samuel Madden
- Language: English
- Genre: speculative fiction, science fiction
- Set in: 20th century
- Publication date: 1733
- Publication place: Ireland
- Media type: book
- Text: Memoirs of the Twentieth Century at Wikisource

Memoirs of the Twentieth Century is an early work of speculative fiction by Irish writer Samuel Madden. This 1733 epistolary novel takes the form of a series of diplomatic letters written in 1997 and 1998. The work is a satire, perhaps modeled after Jonathan Swift's Gulliver's Travels (1726). Madden was an Anglican clergyman, and the book is focused on the dangers of Catholicism and Jesuits, depicting a future where they dominate.

The book was published anonymously. Soon after it was published, Madden seems to have had most copies destroyed. Although this would mean the book had little influence in its own time (with a negligible contemporary readership and no real impact on later writers), the book is notable as an early work to feature time travel. In his 1987 work Origins of Futuristic Fiction, Paul Alkon describes the book as the earliest in English literature to feature time travel, but notes that it does not explain how it was performed. In the 2008 book Physics of the Impossible, Michio Kaku calls the work arguably the first account of time travel in fiction.

== Plot ==
The book's title page presents the work as being composed "in six volumes," of which the present book is only "Vol. I"; but in fact no more volumes were ever published.

The book is a series of letters from British representatives in the foreign cities of Constantinople, Rome, Paris, and Moscow and a smaller number of letters returned to them from the UK. The representatives address their letters to a Lord High Treasurer who is in service of King George VI. (Note: The King of England in 1733 was George II; a real George VI would later exist, and reign from 1936 to 1952.) The technology of the 20th century is unchanged from Madden's own era; the focus is instead on the political and religious state of the world in the future.

In Madden's future history, much of the world has come to be dominated by the Jesuits. In the early 19th century, a Jesuit became Pope Paul IX; (Note: The Society of Jesus was formed under Paul III in 1540; the most recent Paul in 1733 would have been Paul V (r. 1605–1621). As of 2024, the most recent real-world Pope by that name was Paul VI (r. 1963–1978), and the first Jesuit pope was Francis (r. 2013–2025).) he seized temporal control over most of Italy. The eighteenth century had been one of war between Spain, France, and the Holy Roman Empire, but weakened by conflict and mismanagement all three powers became vassals to the Pontiff by the mid-nineteenth century. Also under papal control are vast estates in Africa, China, and Paraguay.

In France, King Louis XIX (Note: The King of France in 1733 was Louis XV; the real Louis Antoine, Duke of Angoulême, would later have become Louis XIX but for the revolution of 1830.) reigns but the French state is weak and he is controlled by his Jesuit prime minister. In Constantinople, the Ottoman Empire has fallen and been replaced by a Tatar one. The new regime pursued a liberal religious policy, and by 1997 Deism and Christianity had come to dominate, with Jesuit missionaries active and powerful. Russia is an expansionist power, having annexed Finland, Poland, and parts of Persia and Turkey; while traditionally a foe of the Jesuits the late 20th century sees them growing in power there as well.
