= John Manners, 3rd Duke of Rutland =

British politician

His Grace The Duke of Rutland KG PC
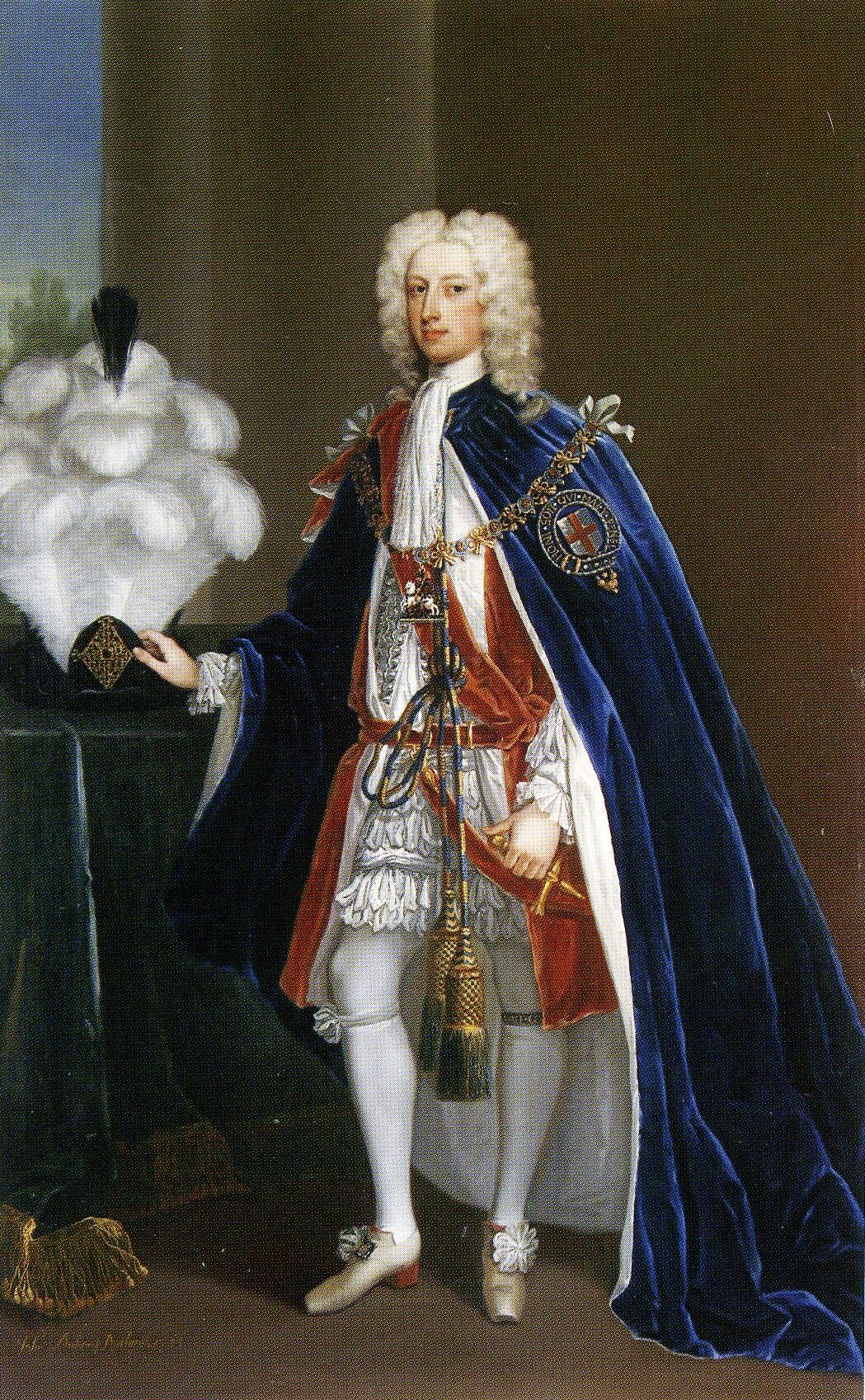
- Portrait by Charles Jervas, 1725

Lord-Lieutenant of Leicestershire
- In office 1721–1779
- Monarchs: George I George II; George III
- Preceded by: The Duke of Rutland
- Succeeded by: The Duke of Rutland

Personal details
- Born: 21 October 1696
- Died: 29 May 1779 (aged 82)
- Party: Whigs
- Spouse: Bridget Sutton (1699-1734)
- Domestic partner: Elizabeth Drake (c.1716-c.1800)
- Children: 11, including John, Robert, and George
- Parent(s): John Manners, 2nd Duke of Rutland; Catherine Russell

John Manners, 3rd Duke of Rutland KG PC (21 October 1696 – 29 May 1779) was a British politician who was the eldest son of John Manners, 2nd Duke of Rutland and Catherine Russell. Styled Marquess of Granby from 1711, he succeeded to the title in 1721, cutting short a brief career in the House of Commons, where he had represented Rutland as a Whig.

== Biography ==
John Manners (1696–1779), 3rd Duke of Rutland by Jonathan Richardson the elder (Calke Abbey)

He held a variety of government and court positions including Lord Lieutenant of Leicestershire 1721–1779, Chancellor of the Duchy of Lancaster 1727–1736, Lord Steward of the Household 1755–1761, and Master of the Horse 1761–1766.

He represented Rutland in the British Parliament from January 1719 to February 1721. He was one of the directors of the Royal Academy of Music, establishing a London opera company which commissioned numerous works from Handel, Bononcini and others.

In 1722 he became a Knight of the Order of the Garter and in 1727 was sworn of the Privy Council. He supported the creation of London's Foundling Hospital and was one of its founding governors when it received its royal charter in 1739. The city of Rutland, Vermont is named after him.

During the Jacobite rising of 1745, Lord Manners raised a Regiment of Foot, in which his son John, Marquess of Granby was appointed colonel.

== Art collection ==
Godfrey Kneller - Bridget Manners (née Sutton) 3rd Duchess of Rutland

Elizabeth Drake by Isaac Whood (Belvoir Castle, Leicestershire)

John Manners, the 3rd Duke, was a collector of art. He started buying in 1742 and for two decades bought paintings, drawings and prints at the London art auctions. Agents bought for him at other auctions and he bought privately too, through dealers. On the death of his father, John, the 2nd Duke of Rutland, in 1721, the 3rd Duke had inherited the family collection of paintings acquired by his forebears including Old Masters and an uninterrupted run of ancestral portraits.

He liked small pictures and was reported to have said that "A man did not deserve a good picture that would not carry it home himself". As a result, he spent less on his collection than other collectors who preferred bigger, more expensive paintings. For example, he did not buy on par with his grandson, Charles, the 4th Duke of Rutland, friend and patron of Sir Joshua Reynolds. Nevertheless, he was a serious collector whose eye and temperament led him to buy smaller works of all the major European painters including Raphael, Titian, Bassano, Veronese, Guido Reni, and the Italianate northerners, especially Claude and the two Poussins. He is known to have spent some £3,210 on paintings but this figure must be taken as approximate and open to revision if new records come to light. By way of comparison, the building of his London townhouse in the same period, cost some £4,432.

For an unknown reason, the Duke sold 200 paintings in 1758–1759.

== Chess variant ==
In 1747 the Duke launched into the world an expanded form of the game of chess, on a board with 140 squares (ten ranks and fourteen files), each player having, in addition to the usual array, a concubine (combining the moves of rook and knight), two crowned rooks (rooks with the added power of taking a diagonal step), two extra bishops, an extra knight, and six extra pawns. This game became popular among the leading players of the time (Abraham Janssen, for example), and is still played.

== Family ==
On 27th August 1717 he married Bridget Sutton, the 17-year-old heiress of Robert Sutton, 2nd Baron Lexinton of Aram Sutton. They had eleven children, most of whom died young:

- Lady Catherine Rachel Manners (1718–1723), died young
- Lady Caroline Manners (1719–1724)
- Lady Frances and Lady Bridget Manners (1719–1719), twins
- John Manners, Marquess of Granby (1721–1770)
- Lord Robert Manners-Sutton (1722–1762)
- Lord George Manners-Sutton (1723–1783)
- Lord William Manners (29 July 1724 – 11 March 1730)
- Lady Leonora Manners (1725–1740)
- Lady Frances Manners (1726 – 3 February 1739)
- Lord Frederick Manners (1728–1730)

On the Duchess' death at the age of 35 in 1734, the Duke took her lady's maid, Elizabeth Drake (c1716-1800), as his companion. Miss Drake remained the Duke's partner for over forty years and bore the Duke two children:

- Roosilia Thoroton (née Drake Manners) (1736–1823) (married Thomas Thoroton)
- Capt. Edward Manners (1745–1811)

The Duke died in 1779 at the age of 82 at Rutland House, Knightsbridge, London and was buried in the Belvoir Castle mausoleum.

== Coat of arms ==
Coat of arms of John Manners, 3rd Duke of Rutland
Coronet A Coronet of a Duke Crest On a Chapeau Gules turned up Ermine a Peacock in its pride proper Escutcheon Or two Bars Azure a Chief quarterly of the last and Gules, in the first and fourth, two Fleur-de-lis, and in the second and third, a Lion passant guardant, all Or Supporters On either side a Unicorn Argent armed, maned, tufted and unguled Or Motto Pour Y Parvenir ("So as to accomplish it") Orders The Garter circlet; motto: Honi soit qui mal y pense (Shame be to him who thinks evil of it).

Parliament of Great Britain
Preceded by Lord Finch; John Noel	Member of Parliament for Rutland; 1719–1721; With: Lord Finch	Succeeded by Lord Finch; Sir Thomas Mackworth, Bt
Political offices
Preceded by The Lord Lechmere	Chancellor of the Duchy of Lancaster; 1727–1736	Succeeded by The Earl of Cholmondeley
Preceded by The Duke of Marlborough	Lord Steward; 1755–1761	Succeeded by The Earl Talbot
Preceded by The Earl of Huntingdon	Master of the Horse; 1761–1766	Succeeded by The Earl of Hertford
Honorary titles
Preceded by The Duke of Rutland	Lord Lieutenant of Leicestershire; 1721–1779	Succeeded by The Duke of Rutland
Peerage of England
Preceded by John Manners	Duke of Rutland; 1721–1779	Succeeded by Charles Manners
