= Jane Shore Led in Penance to Saint Paul's =

Painting by Edward Penny

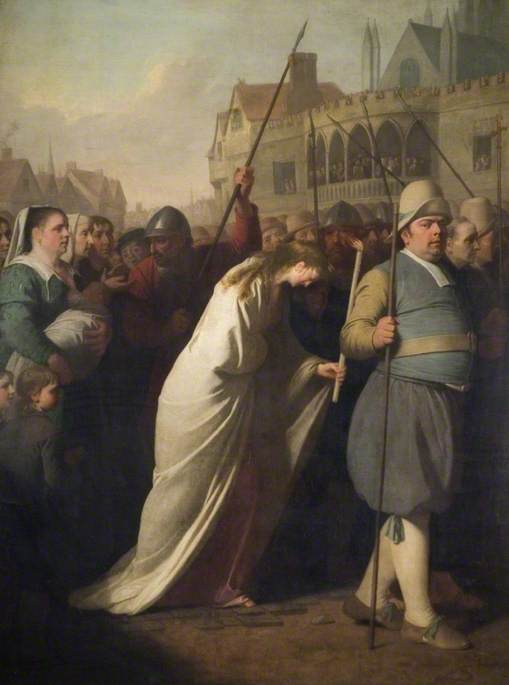
- Artist: Edward Penny
- Year: 1776
- Type: Oil on canvas, history painting
- Dimensions: 162.6 cm × 122 cm (64.0 in × 48 in)
- Location: Birmingham Museum and Art Gallery, Birmingham

Jane Shore Led in Penance to Saint Paul's is a 1776 history painting by the British artist Edward Penny. It depicts a scene in 1483 from the reign of Richard III, when Jane Shore the former mistress of his late brother Edward IV was sentenced to do Penance for adultery by walking barefoot through the streets of London. Dressed in a kirtle, Penny shows her as a dignified figure as she makes her walk of shame. The building on the right represents Old St Paul's Cathedral.

Penny was one of the founding members of the Royal Academy of Arts in 1768. British-themed history painting was rapidly developing as an important genre during this period. The painting was displayed at the Royal Academy Exhibition of 1776 held in London's Pall Mall. Today it is in the collection of Birmingham Museum and Art Gallery, which acquired it in 1960.

== Bibliography ==
- Altic, Richard Daniel. Paintings from Books: Art and Literature in Britain, 1760-1900. Ohio State University Press, 1985.
- Blunt, Anthony. The Art of William Blake. Harper & Row, 1974.
- Ellis, Andrew & Roe, Sonia. Oil Paintings in Public Ownership in Birmingham. Public Catalogue Foundation, 2008.
- Strong, Roy. Painting the Past: The Victorian Painter and British History. Pimlico, 2004.
