= John Manners, Marquess of Granby =

British Army officer and politician (1721–1770)

Lieutenant-General Marquess of Granby PC
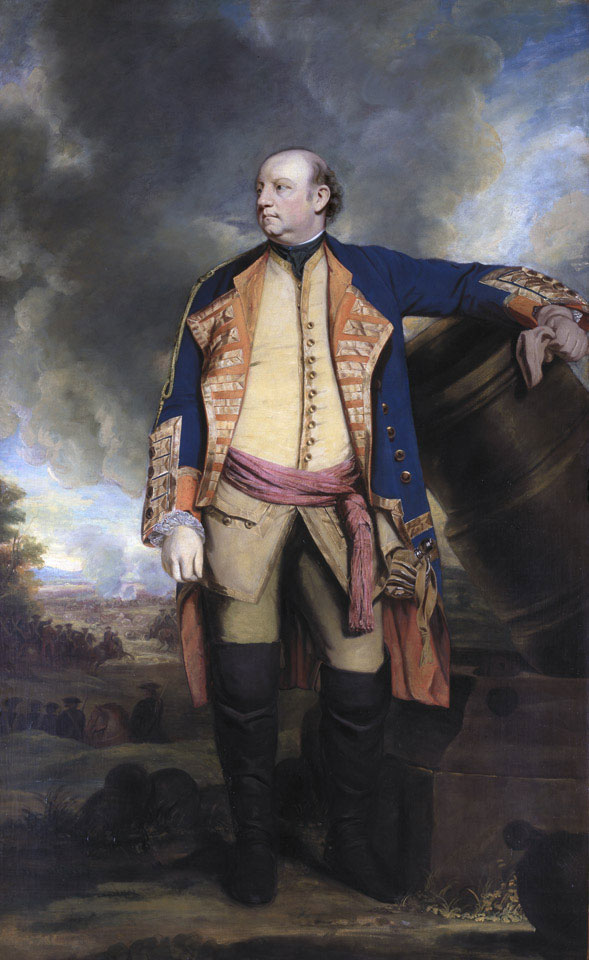
- Portrait by Sir Joshua Reynolds, c. 1773
- Born: 2 January 1721; Kelham, Nottinghamshire
- Died: 18 October 1770 (aged 49); Scarborough, North Yorkshire
- Education: Eton College; University of Cambridge
- Spouse: Lady Frances Seymour (m. 1750)
- Military career
- Allegiance: Great Britain
- Branch: British Army
- Service years: 1745–1770
- Rank: Lieutenant-general
- Commands: 71st Regiment of Foot; Royal Horse Guards; 21st Light Dragoons
- Conflicts: Jacobite rising of 1745; Battle of Culloden; Seven Years' War; Battle of Warburg; Battle of Minden

Lieutenant-General John Manners, Marquess of Granby PC (2 January 1721 – 18 October 1770) was a British Army officer and politician. The eldest son of John Manners, 3rd Duke of Rutland, as he did not outlive his father and inherit the dukedom, Manners was known by his father's subsidiary title, Marquess of Granby. He served in the military during the Jacobite rising of 1745 and the Seven Years' War, being subsequently rewarded with the post of Commander-in-Chief of the Forces. Manners was popular with the troops who served under him and many British pubs are still named after him today.

== Early life ==
John Manners was born in Kelham, Nottinghamshire on 2 January 1721. He was the eldest son of John Manners, 3rd Duke of Rutland and his wife, Lady Bridget Manners (née Sutton). Manners was educated at Eton College, graduating from there in 1732 before attending Trinity College, Cambridge, where he graduated in 1738. In 1740, Manners travelled through Europe as part of the Grand Tour, visiting Italy and the Ottoman Empire before returning in 1742.

== Political career ==
In 1741, he was elected as member of parliament for the pocket borough of Grantham. Though the municipality was a market town, its electorate was relatively small and the affairs of Grantham's council was during the Georgian era sponsored alternately by the Manners, Cust, Thorold and Heathcote families whose family seats were all nearby.

== Military career ==
=== The Jacobite rising ===
In 1745 Manners assisted his father in raising the 71st Regiment of Foot in Rutland to assist in suppressing the Jacobite rising of 1745. Although the regiment was limited to garrison duty at Newcastle upon Tyne, it was the only one of its type that raised the full quota of 780 recruits. Manners received a commission as colonel of the regiment. Even though the regiment was never moved northwards beyond Newcastle, the young Marquess of Granby went to the front as a volunteer on the Duke of Cumberland's field staff and saw active service in the last stages of the insurrection, being present at the Battle of Culloden. In Newcastle the regiment mutinied because they had not been paid but Granby paid the money owed out of his own pocket before they were due to be disbanded. Thereafter he left England for Flanders as Intelligence Officer to Cumberland.

=== Military positions ===
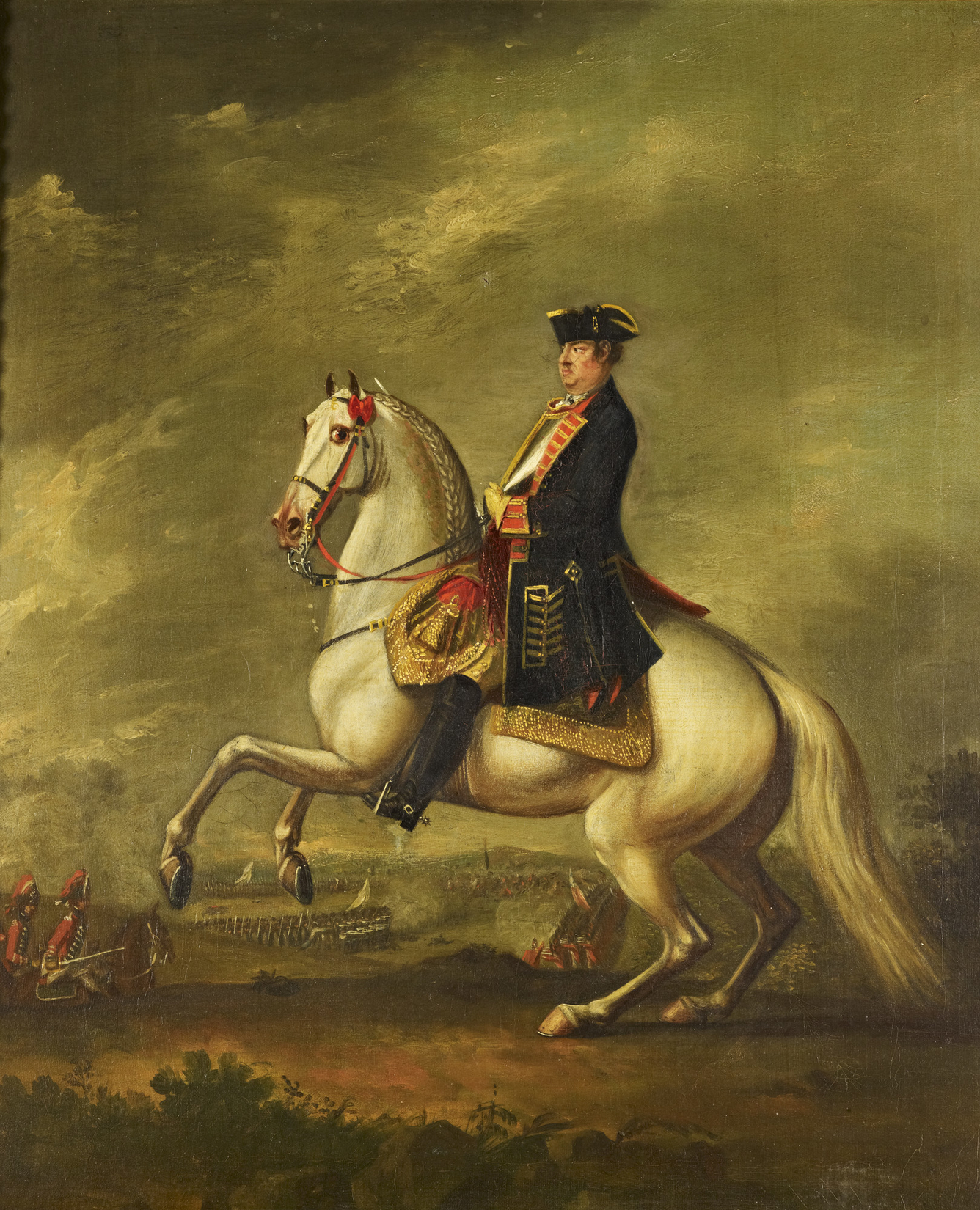
1760 portrait of Manners by David Morier

In 1752, the Government suggested to George II that Granby be appointed colonel of the prestigious Royal Horse Guards (Blues), in order to secure the parliamentary support of his family. The king initially refused to make the appointment. In the meantime, Granby advanced his parliamentary career, and was returned for Cambridgeshire in 1754.

The king came to view him more favourably as he defended the first Newcastle ministry in the House of Commons of Great Britain. He was promoted to major general on 18 March 1755, and was at last made Colonel of the Blues on 27 May 1758. On 21 August, Granby arrived at Munster as second in command to Lord George Sackville, as the aged Duke of Marlborough had recently died. The British cavalry were divided into heavy and light units and drilled under the strong influence of George Elliot and Granby himself. Accredited as the greatest colonel since the Earl of Oxford, Granby was both courageous and competent as a soldier. He was then appointed overall commander of the expedition, replacing Sackville on 21 August 1759. He became Lieutenant-General of the Ordnance on 15 September 1759.

He was one of the first who understood the importance of welfare and morale for the troops. The character of British soldiering improved and, properly led, the army was unbeatable in war. Nearly all the portraits show him mounting a horse or helping the wounded. On 7 June 1760 he wrote to Viscount Barrington, Secretary at War, receiving a reply ten days later making enquiries as to the Hospital Board accommodation for his wounded men.

=== Seven Years' War ===
Granby was sent to Paderborn in command of a cavalry brigade. While leading a charge at the Battle of Warburg, he is said to "have lost his hat and wig, forcing him to salute his commander without them". This incident is commemorated by the British Army tradition that non-commissioned officers and troopers of the Blues and Royals are the only soldiers of the British Army who may salute without wearing headdress. He was promoted to lieutenant-general in 1759 and later that year fought at the Battle of Minden as commander of the second line of cavalry under Duke Ferdinand of Brunswick-Wolfenbüttel.

Granby's success in commanding the allied cavalry required courage, control and communication, as well as skill in bringing the horse artillery to bear. The victory at the Battle of Warburg in July 1760 over an army three times the size distinguished his generalship, and marked him as a genuine British military hero. His opponent, the duc de Broglie, was so impressed that he commissioned a portrait of Granby by Sir Joshua Reynolds. Further successes came at the Battle of Emsdorf in July 1760, the Battle of Villinghausen in July 1761 and at the Battle of Wilhelmsthal in June 1762.

== Political offices ==
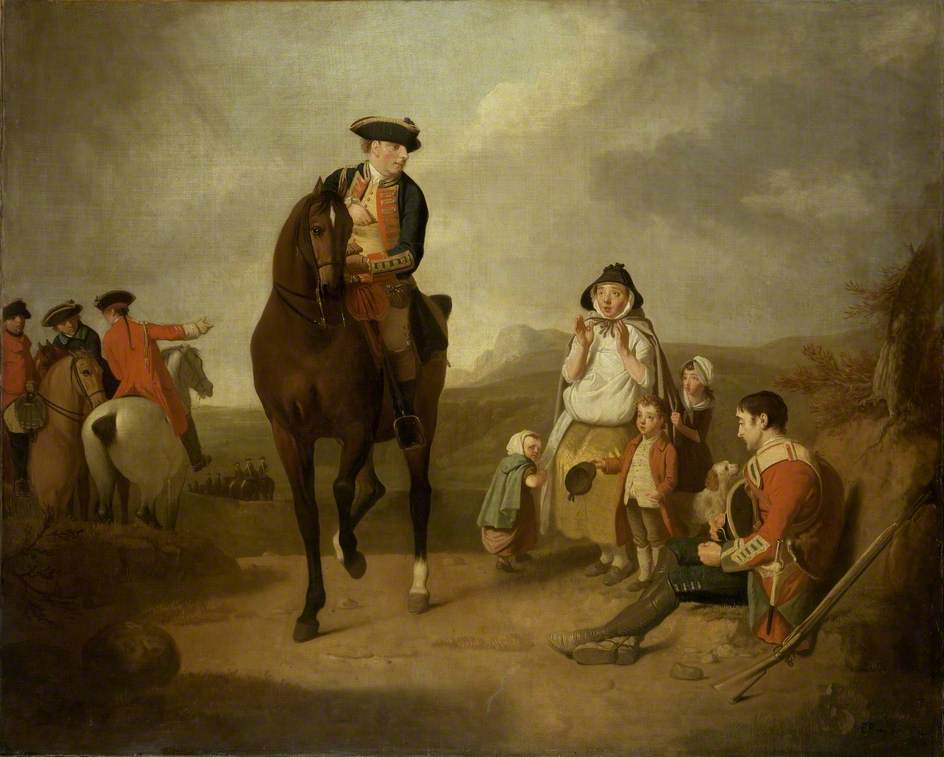
The Marquis of Granby Relieving a Sick Soldier by Edward Penny, 1764

Granby returned to England as a hero: a 1764 painting by Edward Penny, The Marquis of Granby Relieving a Sick Soldier, showed him acting as a man of charity rather than as a soldier and this assured his appeal to the people. An interesting anecdote from 1824 also alludes to his generosity shown towards soldier’s wives:

"Every person who has ever heard or read of the exploits of the late Marquis of Granby knows that his expenditure was most profuse, and his charities almost without limits. In riding along the lines of the British forces, when he was in the chief command of them on the Continent, he used to throw down ducats to every soldier's wife who asked him for them, without discrimination. He not only on these occasions spent all the money he had about his own person, but used to borrow promiscuously of every member of his staff who happened to be near him. His Lordship's generous heart could not bear to keep a person who had asked charity of him a single instant in suspense, and he in consequence drew so lavishly on the pockets of his staff, borrowing of them so hastily, that he used to forget from whom he had received these momentary loans."

He sought to steer a path independent of party politics but supported the Treaty of Paris. He trusted George Grenville who promptly appointed him Master-General of the Ordnance under his ministry on 14 May 1763. Granby was also made Lord Lieutenant of Derbyshire on 21 February 1764.

=== Master-General of the Ordnance ===
Granby supported the government's issue of general warrants and prosecution of Wilkes, but in 1765 spoke against the dismissal of army officers for voting against the government in Parliament. In May 1765, Lord Halifax attempted to persuade George III to appoint Granby Commander-in-Chief of the Forces, in the hopes that his popularity would help quell the riot of the London silk weavers. The king refused, having promised the reversion of the post to the Duke of Cumberland, but obtained Granby's retention as Master-General of the Ordnance in the new Rockingham ministry, although Granby did not co-operate with the ministry and voted against the repeal of the Stamp Act.

Under the Chatham Ministry, Granby was appointed commander-in-chief on 13 August 1766. Despite rumours of his retirement, he vigorously electioneered during the 1768 season, and increased the Rutland interests seats to seven, at some expense. With the resignation of Chatham, he found himself somewhat isolated in the Grafton Ministry. While he had opposed the attempts of the government to expel Wilkes from his seat in Middlesex, his personal dislike of Wilkes overcame his principles, and he voted in favor of the expulsion on 3 February 1769 and for the seating of Henry Luttrell afterwards. It was to prove a serious political mistake. Junius, a political writer, attacked the ministry accusing Granby of servility towards the court and personal corruption. Granby's great popularity might have let him ride out the affair, but his reversal on Wilkes provided new ammunition. Worse still, a reply to Junius by his friend Sir William Draper, intended in his defence, essentially validated the charge that the hard-drinking and personable Granby was easily imposed upon by less scrupulous acquaintances.

=== Resignation ===
Ultimately, it was not the attacks of Junius, but the return of Chatham that brought about his departure from politics. Granby had always respected Chatham, and through the mediation of John Calcraft, was eventually persuaded to break with the ministry. On 9 January 1770, he announced that he had reversed himself once more on the propriety of expelling Wilkes, and shortly thereafter resigned as commander-in-chief and Master-General of the Ordnance, retaining only the colonelcy of the Blues.

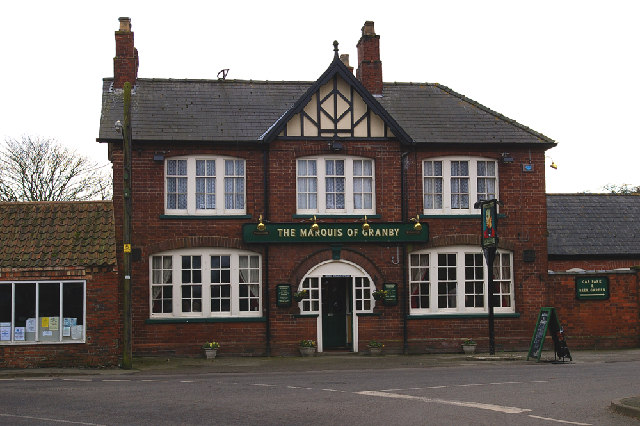
An inn in Lincolnshire, one of many named after him

Once out of office, Granby found himself hard-pressed by his creditors, and the loss of his official salaries had weakened his financial position. In the summer of 1770, he unsuccessfully campaigned for George Cockburne at the Scarborough by-election.

== Death ==
Granby died in Scarborough, North Yorkshire on 18 October 1770. The outpouring of grief was real and sustained. His friend and associate Levett Blackborne, a Lincoln's Inn barrister and Manners family adviser who frequently resided at Belvoir, was away at the time, visiting a family relation of Manners' and received the disturbing news on his return to Belvoir. He wrote to George Vernon at Clontarf on 12 February 1771, bemoaning Granby's proclivities that had brought him to ruin:

"You are no stranger to the spirit of procrastination. The noblest mind that ever existed, the amiable man whom we lament was not free from it. This temper plunged him into difficulties, debts and distresses; and I have lived to see the first heir of a subject in the Kingdom have a miserable shifting life, attended by a levee of duns, and at last die broken-hearted."

He is probably best known today for having a great number of English pubs named after him—due, it is said, to his practice of setting up old soldiers of his regiment as publicans when they were too old to serve any longer. By 1761, at forty years of age, he had already won the title of "the Father of the British Army."

== Family ==
He had two illegitimate children by a mistress Anne Mompesson:

- George Manners (1747–1772)
- Anne Manners (1750–1822) married John Manners-Sutton, her first cousin

Five months after the birth of his illegitimate daughter Anne in Lincoln he married Lady Frances Seymour (1728–1761), daughter of Charles Seymour, 6th Duke of Somerset and Lady Charlotte Finch (1693–1773), daughter of 7th Earl of Winchilsea, on 3 September 1750. According to Horace Walpole, "She has above a hundred and thirty thousand pounds. The Duke of Rutland will take none of it, but gives at present six thousand a-year." They had six children:

- John Manners, Lord Roos (29 August 1751 – 2 June 1760, London)
- Lady Frances Manners (1753 – 15 October 1792)
- Charles Manners, 4th Duke of Rutland (1754–1787)
- Lady Catherine Manners, died young
- Lord Robert Manners (1758–1782)
- Lady Caroline Manners, died young

== Sources ==
- Brumwell, Stephen; Speck, W. A. (2001). Cassell's Companion to Eighteenth Century Britain. Orion. ISBN 978-0304347964.
- Mannings, David (2000). Sir Joshua Reynolds: a complete catalogue of his paintings. New Haven, CT: Yale University Press. pp. 321–325. ISBN 0-300-08533-8.
- Massie, Alastair W. (May 2006) [2004]. "Manners, John, marquess of Granby (1721–1770)". Oxford Dictionary of National Biography. Oxford Dictionary of National Biography (online ed.). Oxford University Press. doi:10.1093/ref:odnb/17958. (Subscription, Wikipedia Library access or UK public library membership required.)
- White-Spunner, Barney (2006). Horse Guards. Macmillan. ISBN 978-1405055741.

Parliament of Great Britain
Preceded by The Viscount Tyrconnel; Sir Michael Newton, Bt	Member of Parliament for Grantham; 1741–1754; With: Sir Michael Newton, Bt 1741–1743; Sir John Cust, Bt 1743–1754	Succeeded by Sir John Cust, Bt; Lord George Manners
Preceded by Soame Jenyns; Viscount Royston	Member of Parliament for Cambridgeshire; 1754–1770; With: Viscount Royston 1754–1764; Sir John Hynde Cotton, Bt 1764–1770	Succeeded by Sir John Hynde Cotton, Bt; Sir Sampson Gideon, Bt
Military offices
New regiment	Colonel of the 21st Regiment of (Light) Dragoons (Royal Forresters); 1760	Succeeded by Lord Robert Sutton
Preceded by The Viscount Ligonier	Colonel of the Royal Horse Guards; 1758–1770	Succeeded by Hon. Henry Seymour Conway
Preceded by Lord George Sackville	Lieutenant-General of the Ordnance; 1759–1763	Succeeded by Hon. George Townshend
Preceded by The Viscount Ligonier	Master-General of the Ordnance; 1763–1770	Vacant Title next held by The Viscount Townshend
Vacant Title last held by The Viscount Ligonier	Commander-in-Chief of the Forces; 1766–1769	Vacant Title next held by The Lord Amherst
Honorary titles
Preceded by The Duke of Devonshire	Lord Lieutenant of Derbyshire; 1764–1766	Succeeded by Lord George Cavendish
