= Michael Ford (engraver) =

Irish mezzotint engraver

Michael Ford (died October 1758?), was an Irish mezzotint engraver.

A native of Dublin, Ford had been a pupil of engraver John Brooks. When Brooks left Ireland around 1747, Ford set up shop as his successor in a store on Cork Hill. There, he engraved a number of portraits in mezzotint, which on account of their scarcity are highly valued by collectors. He also painted portraits, and engraved some himself. His subjects included senior judges like Thomas Marlay and Henry Singleton.

Ford's address as publisher appears on some of the engravings by Andrew Miller and James MacArdell. With the former he seems to have been in rivalry, as they often engraved the same subjects, notably Hogarth's full-length portrait of Gustavus Hamilton, of which Ford's print seems to be the earlier of the two.

It is probable that Ford visited London, but this is not certain. On 27 October 1758 the ship Dublin Trader, Captain White, left Parkgate, Cheshire, for Dublin, and foundered in the Irish Sea; she carried 70,000 Irish pounds in money and £80,000 in goods, along with around sixty passengers, among whom were Edward, fifth Earl of Drogheda, the actor Theophilus Cibber, and others. There are grounds for supposing that Ford was also among the passengers.
