= George Bower (priest) =

English churchman and academic

George Buckley Bower (1748–c. 1800) was an English churchman and academic. He was Archdeacon of Richmond from 1797 until his death.

== Life ==
He was the son of Buckley Bower, an attorney in Stockport. He was born there, baptised there on 30 June 1848, and was educated at Manchester Grammar School. He matriculated at The Queen's College, Oxford in 1764, graduating B.A. in 1768. In 1769 he became a Fellow of Brasenose College, Oxford.

From 1787 Bower was the incumbent at Great Billing, becoming also Archdeacon of Richmond in 1797. He died at Aspenshaw Hall, Derbyshire. One source gives the date of death as 26 December 1800. Other sources state he died in 1801.

== Family ==
Bower was married, his wife dying in 1800, before he did. A daughter Frances survived them, dying in 1815.

He was the nephew of Edward Penny, who left him notes of his lectures as first professor of painting at the Royal Academy.

Church of England titles
Preceded by Thomas Breithweite	Archdeacon of Richmond; 1797 - 1801	Succeeded by John Owen
