= 71st Regiment of Foot (1745) =

- Active: 1745–1746
- Country: Kingdom of Great Britain
- Branch: British Army
- Type: Infantry
- Engagements: Jacobite rising of 1745

Commanders
- Colonel of the Regiment: John Manners, Marquess of Granby

The 71st Regiment of Foot, or Granby's Regiment, was a regiment in the British Army from 1745 to 1746.

== History ==
In response to the Jacobite rising of 1745, the regiment was raised on 4 October 1745 in Rutland by Lord John Manners, 3rd Duke of Rutland. Lord Manners' son, John, Marquess of Granby, received a commission as colonel of the regiment. Its lieutenant-colonel was John Stanwix. The new regiment was nicknamed "The Leicester Blues" and received the rank 71st.

Granby's Regiment was the only one of its type that raised the full quota of 780 recruits. It was declared "half complete" on November 4 and ready to move three days later. The ten regiment's companies were scattered: six at Leicester, two at Loughborough and two at Harborough but on November 12, the regiment was to be assembled at Newcastle upon Tyne. Then, to prevent any Jacobite attempt to reach London, it went either to Lichfield or Warwick.

In December, the regiment was part of Cumberland's Army that successfully besieged Carlisle.

On January 9, the regiment was ordered to Newcastle, as the Jacobite Army stayed in the North. Even though the regiment was never moved northwards beyond Newcastle, the young Marquess of Granby went to the front as a volunteer on the Duke of Cumberland's field staff and saw active service in the last stages of the insurrection, being present at the Battle of Culloden.

In Newcastle the regiment mutinied because they had not been paid but Granby paid the money owed out of his own pocket before they were due to be disbanded.

The regiment was ordered back to Leicester on 27 June 1746 and disbanded in the second half of August or on December 25.

== Uniform ==
A contemporary portrait of its colonel and a surviving grenadier cap indicate that Granby's Regiment had blue coats with red facings.
