= Abraham Janssen (chess player) =

British chess player

Abraham Janssen (1720 – 1795) was a British chess player who in his heyday was one of the strongest players in the world.

Janssen was most likely related to Sir Abraham Janssen, 2nd Baronet, a Member (MP) of the Parliament of Great Britain for Dorchester 1720 to 1722. The name Janssen is Flemish or Brabantic so it's also highly likely the family originated in the Southern Netherlands.

Most likely in 1747 Janssen, who was then the best player in England, played a match against Philidor in Old Slaughter's Coffee House in St Martin's Lane. Janssen won one game and lost four, so he lost the match.

Jansen is reported to have been extremely fond of a more complicated version of chess invented by the Duke of Rutland
