= Battle of Warburg =

1760 battle

Coordinates: 51°29′50.50″N 9°07′44.23″E

- Part of the Seven Years' War
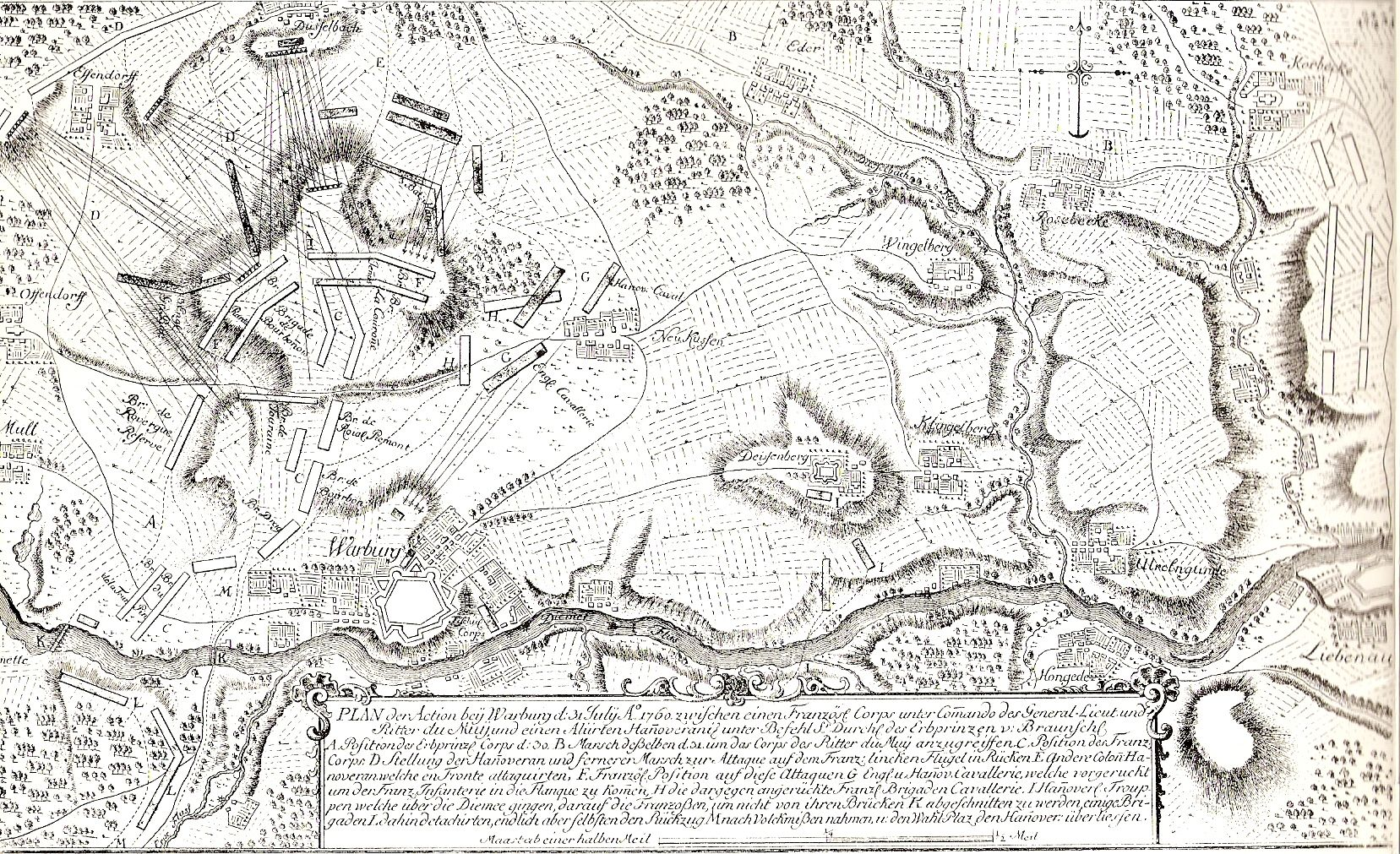
Date	31 July 1760
Location	Warburg, Prince-Bishopric of Paderborn, present-day Germany
Result	Allied victory

Belligerents
(Province of Hanover) Hanover; Great Britain; Brunswick-Wolfenbüttel; Hesse-Kassel	France

Commanders and leaders
Prince Ferdinand; Marquess of Granby	Louis de Muy

Strength
62,000 (16,000 engaged)	130,000 (20,000 engaged)

Casualties and losses
1,200 dead or wounded	1,500 dead or wounded 1,500 prisoners 12 guns lost

The Battle of Warburg was fought on 31 July 1760 during the Seven Years' War. The battle was a victory for the Hanoverians and the British against a slightly larger French army. The victory meant the Anglo-German allies had successfully defended Westphalia from the French by preventing a crossing of the Diemel River, but were forced to abandon the allied state of Hesse-Kassel to the south. The fortress of Kassel ultimately fell, and would remain in French hands until the final months of the war, when it was finally recaptured by the Anglo-German allies in late 1762.

The British general, John Manners, Marquess of Granby, became famous in the battle for charging at the head of the British cavalry and losing his hat and wig during the charge. The French lost 1,500 men, killed and wounded, around 1,500 prisoners and ten pieces of artillery.

== Bibliography ==
- Chenevix-Trench, Charles, A History of Horsemanship, (Doubleday & Co, 1970)
- Skrine, Francis, Fontenoy and Great Britain's share in the War of the Austrian Succession 1741–1748 (William Blackwood, Edinburgh, 1906)
- Williams, Basil, The Whig Supremacy (Oxford History of England Series, OUP, 1960)
