= James MacArdell =

Irish mezzotinter

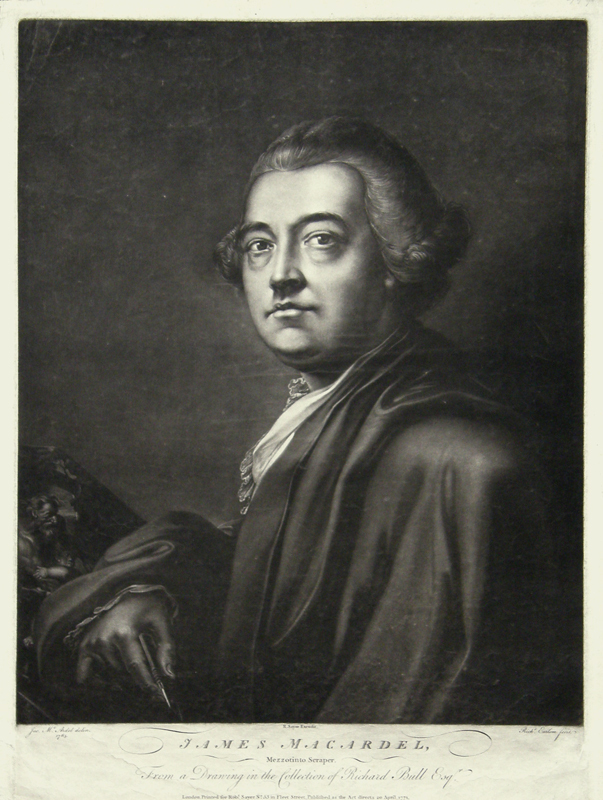
- Portrait of MacArdell, 1771 mezzotint by Richard Earlom
- Born: c. 1729; Dublin
- Died: 2 June 1765 (aged 35–36)
- Known for: Mezzotint

James MacArdell (c. 1729 – 2 June 1765) was an Irish mezzotinter who moved to London, there he was considered one of the finest mezzotint engravers in the country. He engraved portraits of many of the famous people of his time.

== Life ==
He was born in Cow Lane (later Greek Street), Dublin, around 1729. He learnt mezzotint-engraving from John Brooks. When Brooks moved to London in 1746, MacArdell and other pupils, including Charles Spooner, followed him. While in London MacArdell acquired the reputation as one of the finest mezzotint engravers in the country. He opened a print shop at the Golden Head in Covent Garden, where in 1753 he published six views of Dublin. MacArdell died on 2 June 1765 and was buried in the churchyard at Hampstead, where a stone bore an inscription to his memory.

== Works ==
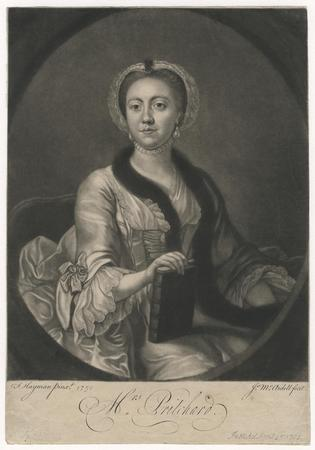
Portrait of the actress Hannah Pritchard, 1762 mezzotint by MacArdell after Francis Hayman.

His earliest work appears to be a head of Archbishop Hugh Boulter in an engraving, altered from one by Brooks of Bishop Robert Howard. A head of Dr. Birch is stated to have been done by MacArdell in London. A portrait of Bishop Thomas Secker, engraved by MacArdell, was published in London in 1767, and also a humorous plate, entitled 'Teague's Ramble.' In 1748 he engraved a portrait of John Cartwright, after S. Elmer, and a small portrait of Charles Bancks, a Swedish painter, for the Chevalier Descazeaux, an eccentric confined in the Fleet Prison, of whose portrait MacArdell made two etchings.

In 1749, he engraved the picture of Lady Boyd, after Allan Ramsay, and the portrait by William Hogarth of Thomas Coram in 1750, the Duke of Dorset, after Kneller, and 'The Sons of the Duke of Buckingham,' after Anthony van Dyck. In 1754 he engraved his first plates after Sir Joshua Reynolds; these plates were the Earl and Countess of Kildare, companion plates, published in Dublin by Michael Ford, and Lady Charlotte Fitzwilliam, published by Reynolds himself. Subsequently, MacArdell engraved thirty-four more portraits by Reynolds and twenty-five by Thomas Hudson. He engraved fine portraits of George III, Queen Charlotte, and one of George II on horseback.

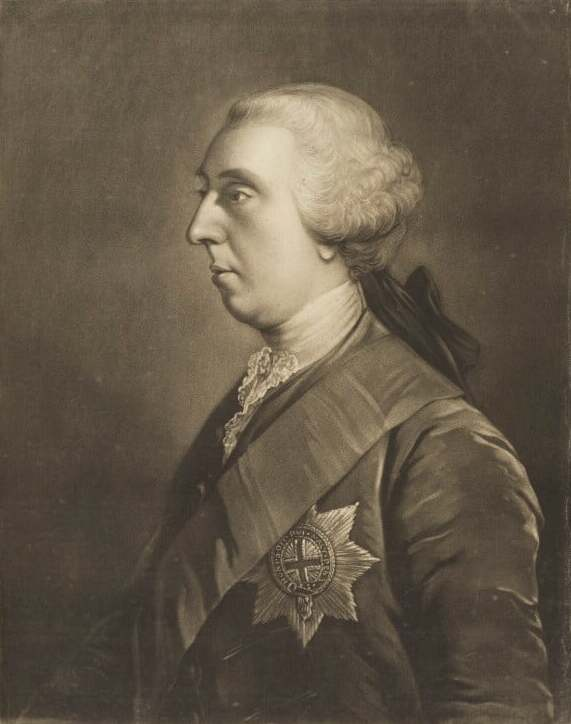
James Waldegrave, 2nd Earl Waldegrave, 1762 mezzotint after Sir Joshua Reynolds.

After Peter Paul Rubens MacArdell engraved 'The Family of Sir Balthasar Gerbier,' and 'Rubens with his Wife and Child,' from the picture once at Blenheim Palace; after Vandyck, 'Time clipping the Wings of Cupid,' 'The Finding of Moses,' and Lord John and Lord Bernard Stuart; after Rembrandt, 'Tobit and the Angel,' 'A Dutch Interior', and 'The Tribute Money.' MacArdell engraved numerous other portraits and subject pictures. Some were from his own drawings, such as those of Charles Blakes, an actor, as 'M. le Medecin,' and David Garrick as 'Peter Puff.'
