= Edward Penny =

English painter

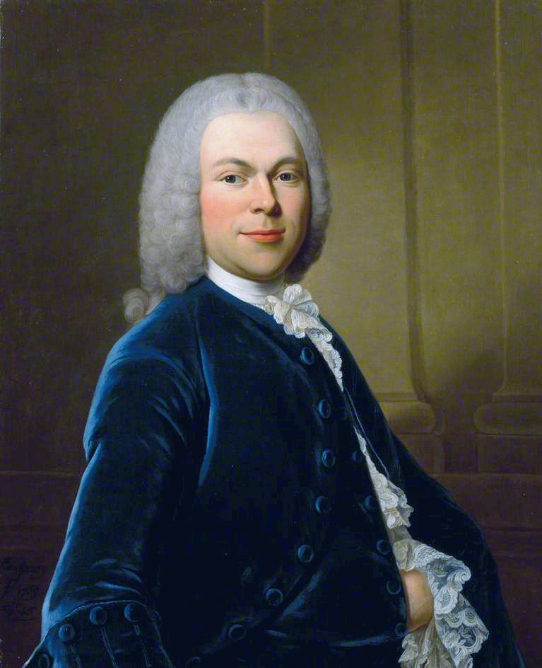
- Self-portrait, 1759. Royal Academy of Arts, London
- Born: 1 August 1714
- Died: 16 November 1791 (aged 77)

Edward Penny RA (1 August 1714 – 16 November 1791) was an English portrait and historical painter, one of the founder members of the Royal Academy.

== Life ==
He one of the twin elder sons of Robert Penny, surgeon, by Clare, daughter of William Trafford, of Swythamley, Staffordshire, and was born at Knutsford, Cheshire in 1714. He was sent to London and placed under the tuition of Thomas Hudson; later he went to Rome and studied under Marco Benefial. He returned to England about 1748, and began his professional career by painting small whole-lengths; later he painted more demanding subjects.

Penny appears to have joined the Incorporated Society of Artists in 1762; but with Benjamin West, Richard Wilson, and others, then withdrew because of internal frictions. In December 1768 he was nominated one of the foundation members of the Royal Academy of Arts, and its first professor of painting. He then ceased to exhibit, and was obliged by ill-health to resign the professorship of painting, in which he was succeeded by James Barry.

Penny died at Chiswick on 16 November 1791, and was buried with his wife at Chessington, Surrey.

== Works ==
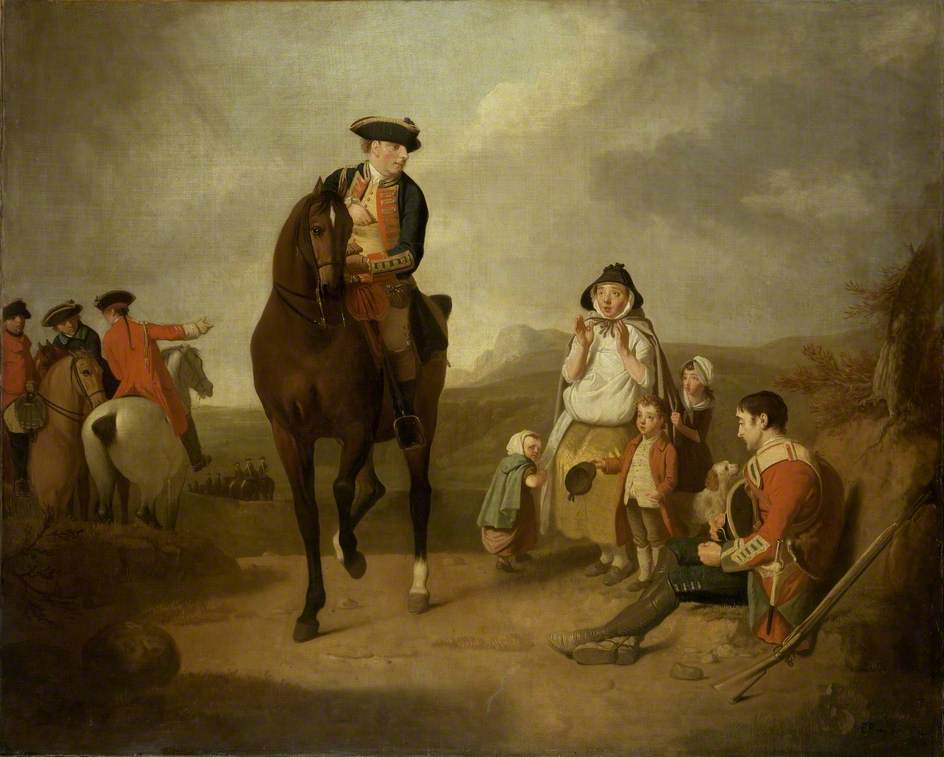
The Marquis of Granby Relieving a Sick Soldier, 1764

At the Exhibition of 1762 Penny exhibited a small whole-length of a lady and a scene in Jane Shore. In 1763 he sent to the exhibition in Spring Gardens a scene from the Aminta of Tasso, and a small whole-length of George Edwards the ornithologist; in 1764, The Death of General Wolfe, which was engraved by Richard Houston, and a scene illustrating Jonathan Swift's Description of a City Shower; in 1765, The Marquis of Granby Relieving a Sick Soldier, engraved by Richard Houston, and The Return from the Fair; in 1767, The Husbandman's Return from Work; and in 1768, The Generous Behaviour of the Chevalier Bayard, engraved by William Pether.

To the first Royal Academy Exhibition of 1769 he contributed The Gossiping Blacksmith based on the smithy scene from Shakespeare's King John, which was engraved by Houston, and to that of 1770 Imogen discovered in the Cave. In Exhibition of 1772 he exhibited Lord Clive explaining to the Nabob the Situation of the Invalids in India, and Rosamond and Queen Eleanor; in 1774, The Profligate punished by Neglect and Contempt and The Virtuous comforted by Sympathy and Attention, a pair engraved by Valentine Green; in 1776, Jane Shore led to do Penance at St. Paul's; in 1779, The Return from the Chase; in 1780, Apparent Dissolution (sold according to information in the Witt Library, London, wrongly catalogued as by Walton, 'A Mishap' by Christies, New York, USA) and Returning Animation (English private collection) a pair engraved by William Sedgwick; in 1781, Lavinia discovered gleaning; and in 1782, The Benevolent Physician, The Rapacious Quack, and Widow Costard's Cow and Goods, distrained for rent, are redeemed by the generosity of Johnny Pearmain.

He was the author of a course of lectures on the art of painting. They were never published, but were left by his will to his nephew, the Ven. George Buckley Bower, archdeacon of Richmond.

== Family ==
Penny married, after 1753 and before 1768, Elizabeth, daughter of John Simmons of Millbank, Westminster and widow of Richard Fortnam, who possessed valuable leasehold property on the Grosvenor estate in London. She died at Chiswick in 1791.

== Gallery ==
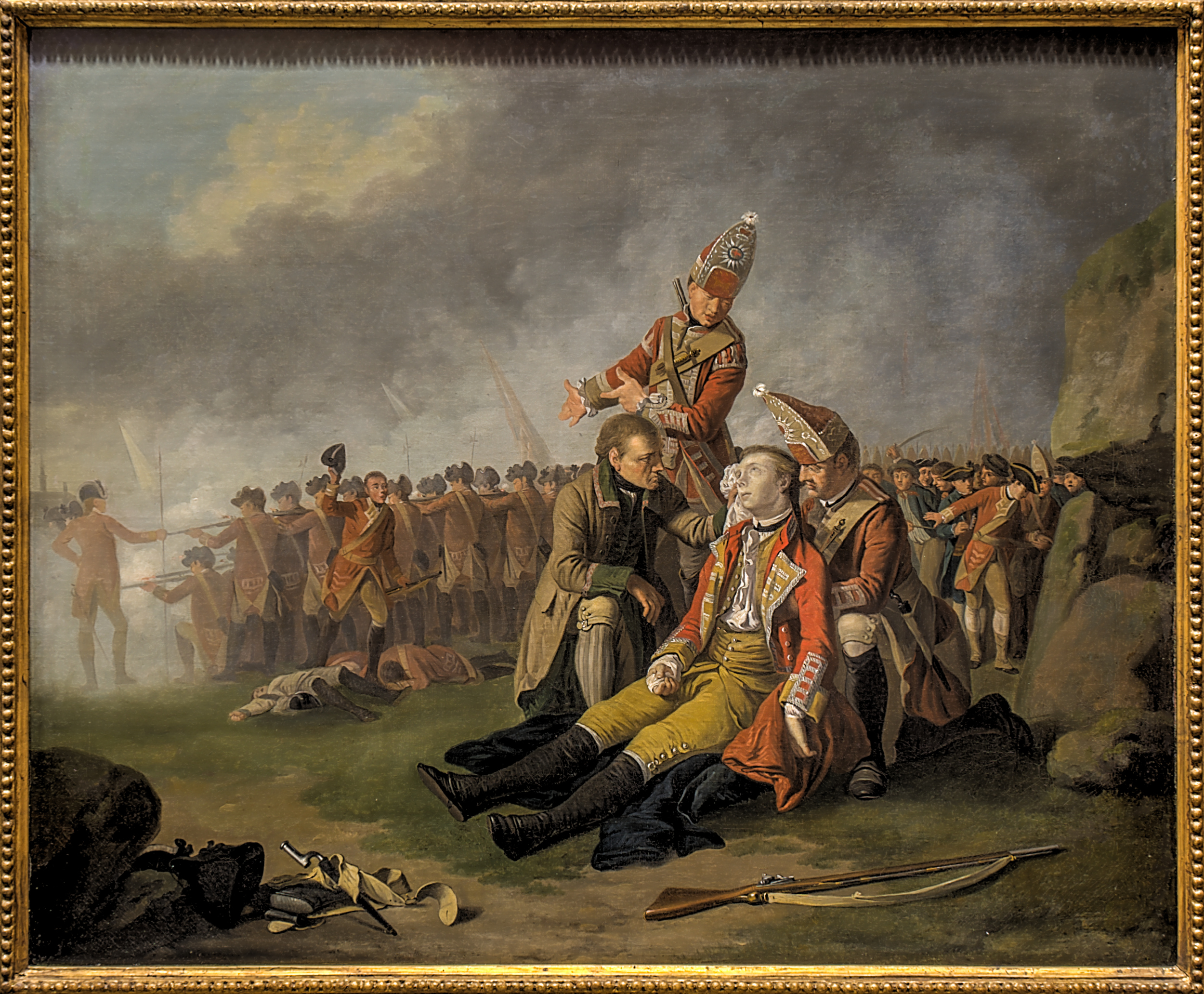
The Death of General Wolfe (c.1763) on display at Fort Ligonier

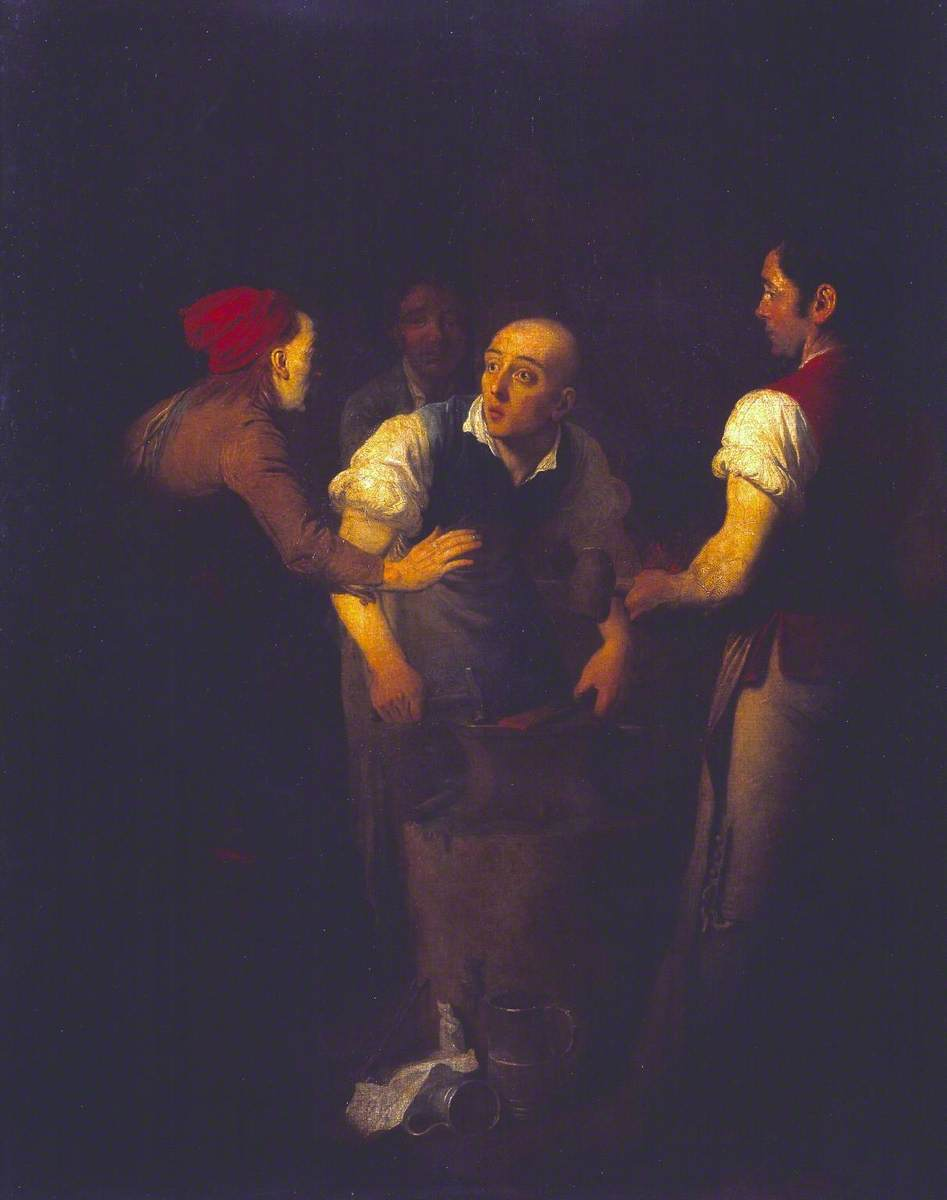
The Gossiping Blacksmith (1769)

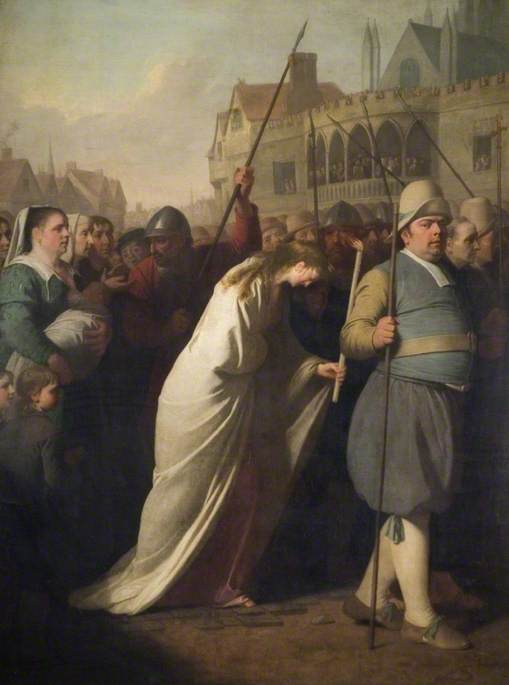
Jane Shore Led in Penance to Saint Paul's (1776)

Lavinia, Daughter of the Once Rich Acasto, Discovered Gleaning, 1781
