= Charles Spooner (engraver) =

Irish mezzotint engraver

- Born: c. 1729; Ireland
- Died: 5 December 1767 (aged c. 38); London, England, Great Britain

Charles Spooner (c. 1729 - 5 December 1767) was an Irish mezzotinter, who worked in London towards the end of his life.

== Life ==
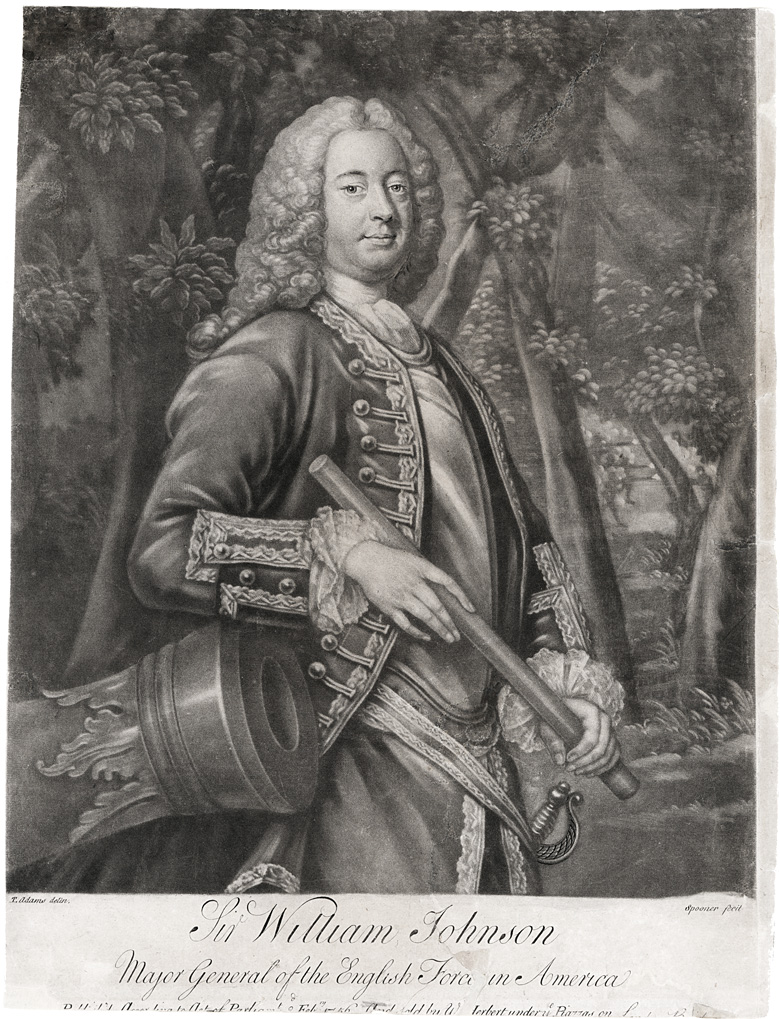
Portrait of Sir William Johnson (1756).

He was born in County Wexford, and became a pupil of John Brooks. When Brooks moved to London in 1746, Spooner worked for various Dublin print-sellers, with some works attributed to him between 1749 and 1752, including three portraits of important Dublin figures: Samuel Madden, Thomas Prior, and Anthony Malone.

He then moved to London in 1752, possibly invited by fellow pupil, James MacArdell, who helped him secure commissions but Strickland notes that "intemperate habits and wayward disposition stood in the way of his attaining the success to which his talents entitled him." He mainly worked making copies of plates by other engravers, for Robert Sayer and Carington Bowles, the print-sellers. After MacArdell's death, Spooner struggled to find work. During his time in London, only 43 prints are signed by him, in comparison to 230 by MacArdell.

Spooner died in London on 5 December 1767, his life being shortened by drink, and was buried beside his friend Macardell by Spooner's request, in Hampstead churchyard.

== Works ==
In Dublin, Spooner painted portraits of William Hogarth (1749), Anthony Malone, Samuel Madden (1752), and Thomas Prior (1752). Later he engraved some further portraits, some from his own drawings, as well as genre subjects after Rembrandt, Teniers, Schalken, Mercier, and others.
