= Samuel Madden (author) =

Irish author (1686–1765)

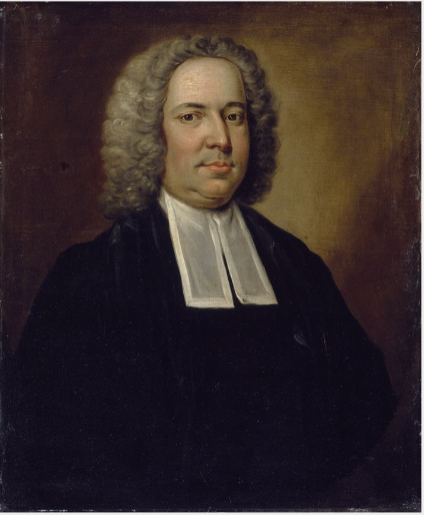
- Born: 23 December 1686
- Died: 31 December 1765 (aged 79)
- Writing career
- Notable works: Themistocles, the Lover of His Country; Memoirs of the Twentieth Century; Reflections and Resolutions Proper for the Gentlemen of Ireland

Samuel Madden (23 December 1686 – 31 December 1765) was an Irish author. His works include Themistocles; The Lover of His Country, Reflections and Resolutions Proper for the Gentlemen of Ireland, and Memoirs of the Twentieth Century. Dr. Samuel Johnson wrote of him, "His was a name which Ireland ought to honour". He suggested that the Royal Dublin Society initiate a scheme to fund improvements in agriculture and arts in Ireland via the use of premiums – the source of his nickname Premium.

== Biography ==
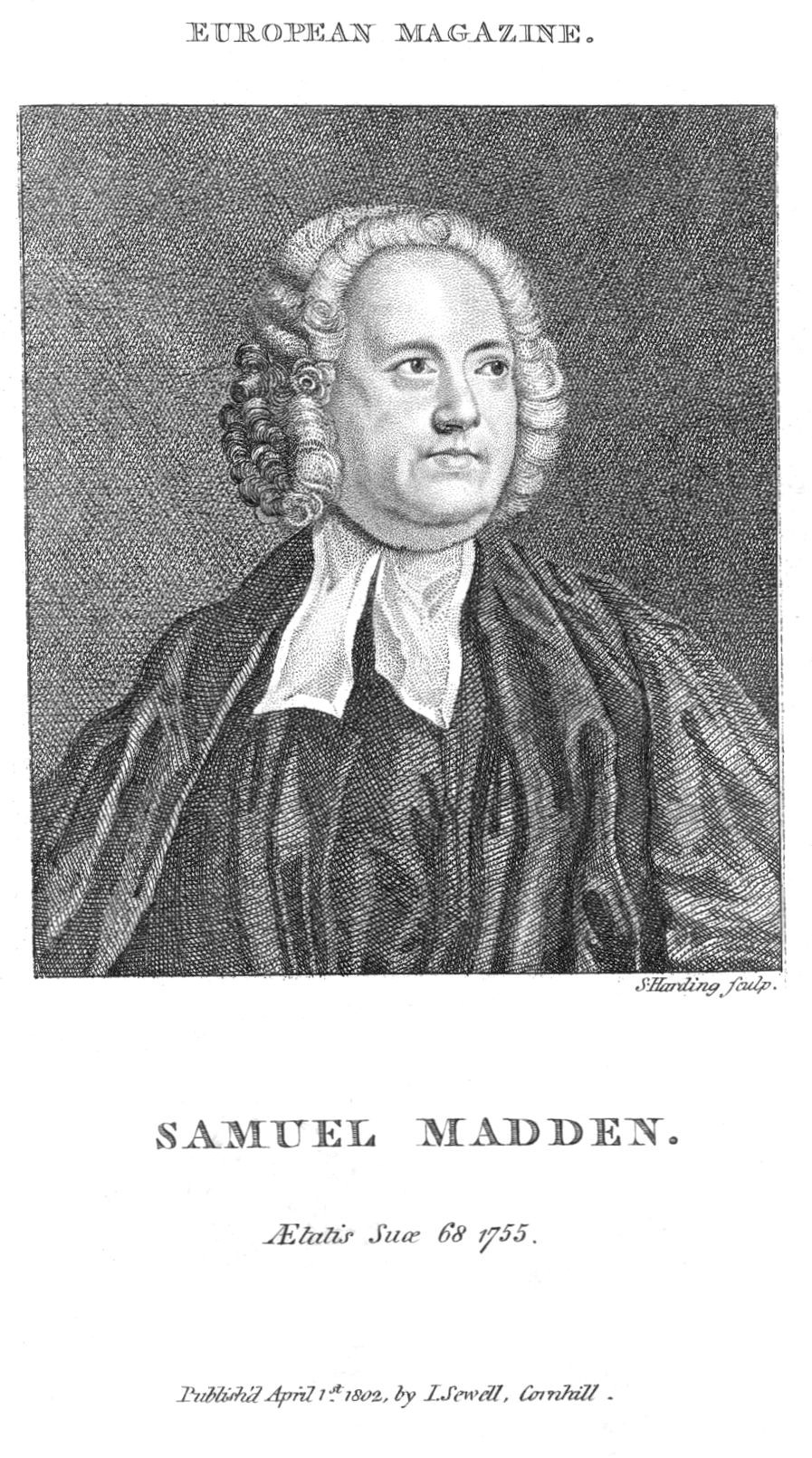
Samuel Madden

Rev. Samuel Madden, D.D., commonly called "Premium" Madden, was born on 23 December 1686 in Dublin, Ireland. His father was John Madden, and his mother was Mary Molyneux, sister of William and Thomas Molyneux.

In 1729, he wrote a tragedy entitled Themistocles, the Lover of His Country.

In 1733, he wrote Memoirs of the Twentieth Century, one of the first science fiction novels. However, it was suppressed by Sir Robert Walpole, and is now very rare. A reprint of the original sheets appeared with Garland Publishing in 1972 (ISBN 0824005708). The work was originally designed to have six volumes yet was discontinued after volume one.

In 1738, he wrote his most famous work, Reflections and Resolutions Proper for the Gentlemen of Ireland, in which he described the poor living conditions in Ireland at the time.

Samuel Madden died on 31 December 1765, at age 79. He married Jane McGill of Kirktown, County Armagh and had ten children, including Samuel Molyneux Madden (died 1798), his heir. His descendants included Dodgson Hamilton Madden, scholar and High Court judge.

== Works ==
- Themistocles, The Lover of His Country. A Tragedy. As it is Acted at the Theatre-Royal, in Lincoln's-Inn-Fields (1729)
- Memoirs of the Twentieth Century,: Being original letters of state under George the Sixth (1733)
- Reflections and Resolutions Proper for the Gentlemen of Ireland, as to their Conduct for the Service of their Country, as Landlords, as Masters of Families, as Protestants, as Descended from British Ancestors, as Country Gentlemen and Farmers, as Justices of the Peace, as Merchants, as Members of Parliament (1738)
- The reign of George VI. 1900–1925: A forecast written in the year 1763 (1763)
- A Proposal for the General Encouragement of Learning in Trinity College (publication unknown)
- Memoir of the life of the late Rev. Peter Roe: With copious extracts from his correspondence, diaries, and other remains (publication unknown)
