= Prebends of Southwell =

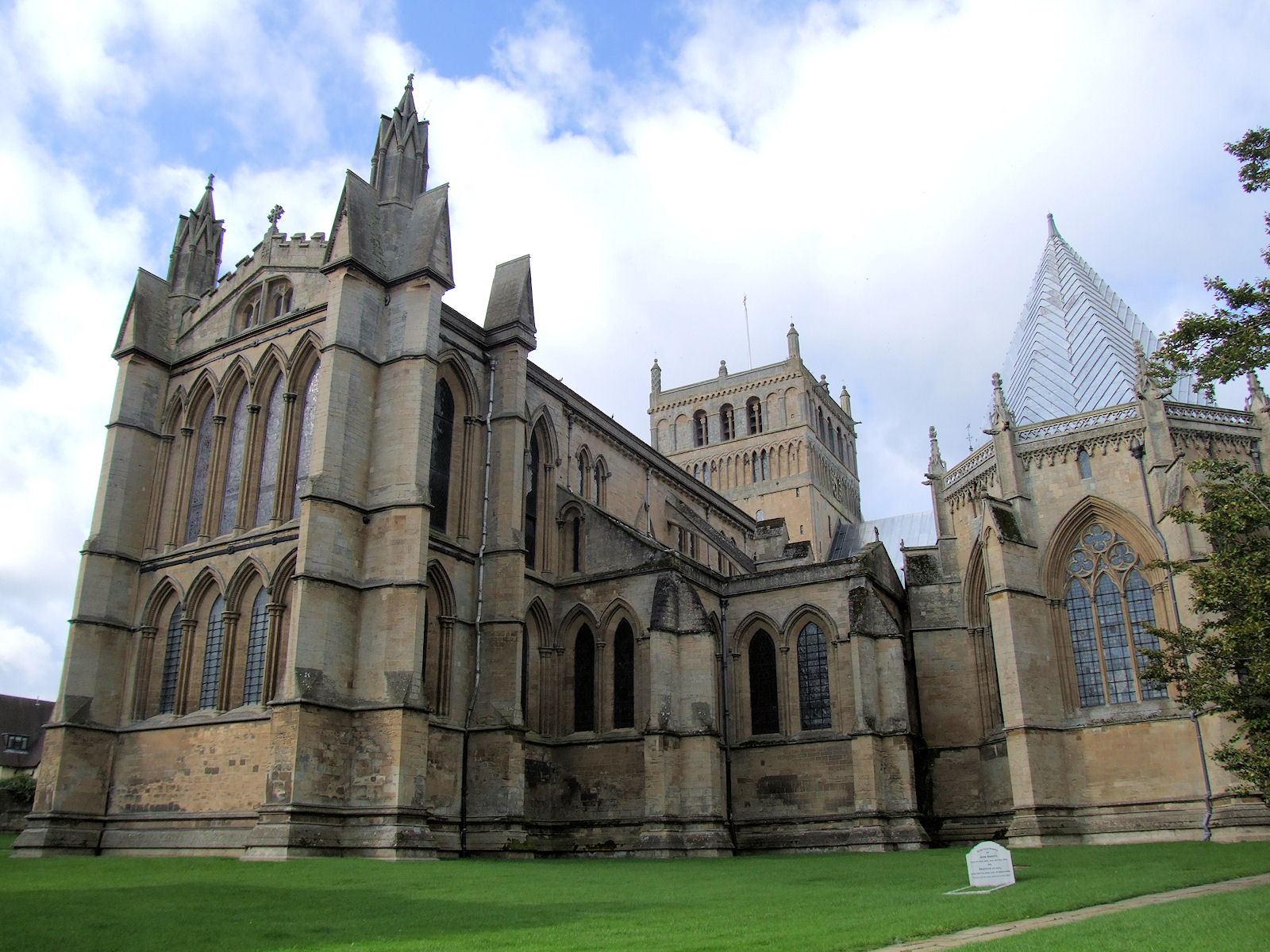
Southwell Minster

The Prebends of Southwell were the benefices held by the prebendaries, or canons, of Southwell Minster.

== History ==
The Prebends of Southwell were established from the eleventh century and by 1291, the number had grown to sixteen. In 1540 the prebends and minster were suppressed but an act of Parliament in 1543, the Southwell Collegiate Church Act 1542 (34 & 35 Hen. 8. c. 45 Pr.), re-established the college and church collegiate of Southwell. Under the Dissolution of Colleges Act 1547 (1 Edw. 6. c. 14), the prebendaries were given pensions and their estates sold. The minster continued as the parish church on the petitions of the parishioners.

By a royal charter of Philip and Mary in 1557, the minster and its prebends were restored. On 2 April 1585 a set of statutes was promulgated by Queen Elizabeth I and the chapter operated under this constitution until it was dissolved in 1841. The Ecclesiastical Commissioners made provision for the abolition of the chapter as a whole; the death of each canon after this time resulted in the extinction of his prebend. The chapter came to its appointed end on 12 February 1873 with the death of the Rev Thomas Henry Shepherd, rector of Clayworth and prebendary of Beckingham.

The Prebends of Southwell now are best known by the Prebendal houses, ten of which survive to this day, most as private residences in the town.

The sixteen Prebends of Southwell are described below:

== Sacrista Prebend ==
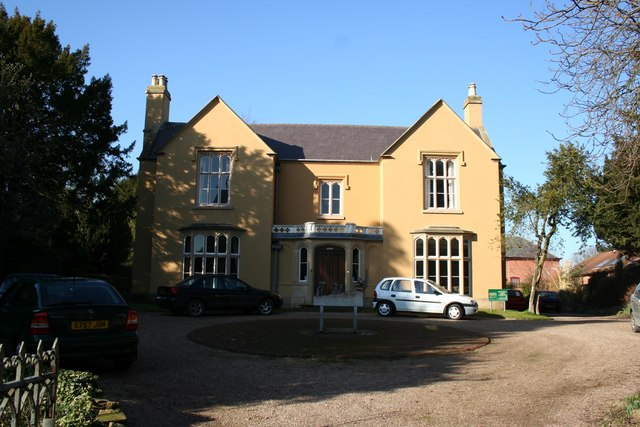
Sacrista Prebendal House

This is also known as the Sacrists Prebend or Segeston Prebend. The revenues for this prebend came from lands in Southwell and Bleasby, and 10% of the offerings at Pentecost.

This former prebendal house, served for a time as the headmaster's house for Southwell Minster School. The front range was built between 1774 and 1798 for Nicholas Hutchinson and incorporated parts of an earlier house in the rear wings. It is now a retreat centre operated by the Diocese of Southwell and Nottingham. It is Grade II listed.

=== The Prebendaries of Sacrista Prebend ===
- John de Ferrer 1299
- John de Burton 1350 - 1360
- John de Sculthorpe 1360 – 1367
- Robert Ascough until 1448
- Richard Bell 1448 – 1453
- William Ads 1453 – 1458
- John Toralde 1458 – 1472
- Edmund Chaterton 1472 – 1474
- John Barrow 1474
- John Warkworth 1474 – 1498
- Richard Burton 1498 – 1506
- John Hatton 1506 – 1516
- Thomas Edwards 1517 – 1526
- John Wilkinson 1625 – 1532
- John Keale 1532 – 1537
- John Adams 1537
- Richard Hopkins 1559 – 1575
- Robert Gibson 1575 – 1588
- Francis Whitmoer 1588 – 1598
- John Paycocke 1598 – 1599
- John Jegon 1599 – 1603
- Thomas Pettye 1603 – 1609
- Samuel Fleming 1609 – 1620
- Richard Barnard 1620
- Timothy Long 1660 – 1665
- John Garthwait 1665 – 1670
- George Masterson 1670 – 1686
- Benjamin Clay 1686 – 1692
- William Pearson 1692 – 1695
- Nathan Drake 1695 – 1705
- Benjamin Carter 1705 – 1732
- Thomas Blunt 1732 – 1733
- Andrew Matthews 1733 – 1762
- John Marsden 1762 – 1767
- Samuel Abson 1767 – 1768
- Ralph Heathcote 1768 – 1795
- Richard Sutton 1795 – 1798
- Charles Wylde 1798 – 1825
- Charles Nixon 1825 – 1837

== The Prebend of Normanton ==
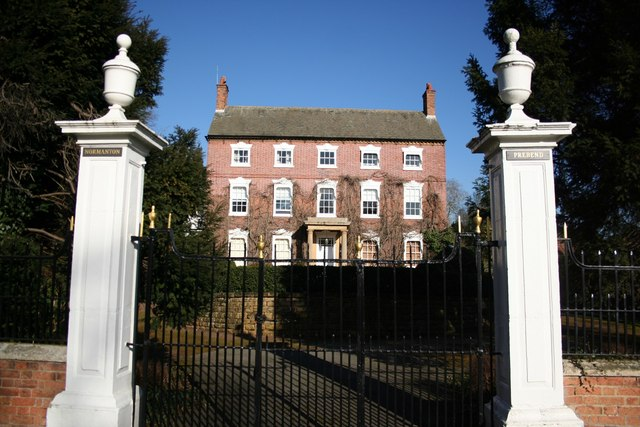
Normanton Prebendal House

The revenues for this prebend came from lands in Normanton and Southwell.

The former prebendal house of Normanton, was built for Margaretta Tibson around 1766, and probably incorporated parts of an early 18th century house. It is Grade II listed.

=== The Prebendaries of Normanton ===
- Stephen ca 1238
- Henry de Skypton ca 1266
- Robert de la Forth ca 1291
- William de Rotherfeld 1291
- John de Sandale ca 1330s
- Thomas Moore until 1421
- Thomas Wyott 1421
- John Marescall until 1461
- Thomas Worseley 1461 – 1463
- John Danvers 1463 – 1495
- Henry Horneby 1495 – 1518
- John Fraunces de Dottis 1518 – 1526
- John Allen 1526 – 1528
- John Bell 1528
- Henry Welshe 1558 – 1559
- Henry Bovell 1559 – 1562
- Walter Jones 1562 – 1577
- John Cooper 1577 – 1610
- Robert Abbot 1610 – 1615
- Bryan Atkinson 1615 – 1616
- George Barnard 1616 – 1639
- Anthony Elcock 1660 – 1670
- Samuel Drake 1670 – 1671
- William Mompesson 1671 – 1709
- George Barnardiston 1709 – 1712
- Stephen Cooper 1712 – 1736
- Joseph Atwell 1736 – 1743
- Matthew Bradford 1743 – 1750
- Claudius Daubuz 1750 – 1760
- William Rastall 1760 – 1789
- George Desmeth Kelly 1789 – 1823
- George Wilkins 1823 - 1865

== The Prebend of Norwell Overhall ==
Also known as Norwell I. The revenues for the Prebend came from estates around Norwell, Norwell Woodhouse and Carlton-upon-Trent.

=== The Prebendaries of Norwell Overhall ===
- Stephen de Ferentino until 1234
- Johannes Clericus 1234
- John Clarell ca. 1256 – 1293
- Elyas de Couton 1293 – 1329
- John de Thorseby 1329 – 1340
- William de Northwell 1340 - 1353
- William de Northwell 1353 – ca 1370
- Thomas de Oxgrave 1370, resigned April 1370
- Thomas de Moynut (Mynot) de Ikham (or Wycham) appointed 18 May 1370
- Richard de Chesterfield circa 1382 to 1404
- Robert Wolveden 1404 – 1432
- William Duffield 1432 – 1450
- William Grave 1450
- William Duffeld (again) 1451 – 1452
- William Worsley 1453 – 1499
- Henry Cranebull 1499 – 1507
- Richard Wyat 1507 – 1522
- Thomas Wynter 1522 – 1529
- John Oliver 1529
- Robert Johnson 1558 – 1559
- Thomas Willson 1559 – 1562
- Thomas Barwicke 1562 – 1580
- Richard Gerrard 1580 – 1614
- William Barlowe 1614
- Edward Dix 1660 – 1669
- John Garthwait 1669 – 1678
- Samuel Brearey 1678 – 1703
- Thomas Hawkings 1703 – 1717
- Thomas Sharpe 1717 – 1758
- Robert Gilbert 1758 – 1777
- William Cooper 1777 – 1786
- Cyril Jackson 1786 – 1787
- George Markham 1787 – 1802
- John Eyre 1802 – 1830
- Charles George Venables Vernon 1830

== The Prebend of Norwell Palishall ==
Also known as Norwell II or Norwell Palace-Hall. The revenues for the Prebend came from estates around Norwell, Norwell Woodhouse and Carlton-upon-Trent.

=== The Prebendaries of Norwell Palishall ===
- Henry le Vavsour ca. 1266 - 1280
- A. de Becks 1280
- Richard de Bamfeud or Baumfeld ca. 1290s
- Dns Lambertus Nat. Nign Camby de Florentia 1298
- John Droxford 1304 - 1309
- William de Melton 1309
- Robert de Woodhouse 1317
- John de Northwell
- William de Gunthorpe ca 1381 – 1400
- Richard de Conyngston 1400 – 1413
- John Brounesgrove 1414 – 1415
- Richard de Clifford 1415 – 1422
- Henry Bowet 1422 – 1442
- John Lathum 1442 – 1450
- John Sutton 1450 – 1451
- John Porter 1451 – 1479
- William Clifton 1479 - 1491
- Hugh Trotter 1491 – 1492
- Edmund Carter 1492 – 1505
- Martyn Colyns 1505 – 1509
- Christopher Urswick 1509 – 1521
- Thomas Wynter 1522
- Richard, Bishop of Negroponte 1522 – 1528
- Thomas Donyngton 1528 – 1532
- Thomas Byrton 1532 – 1535
- Galfrid Downes 1535
- Thomas Laken 1561 – 1575
- William Palmer 1575 – 1605
- Andrew Binge 1605
- Daniel Vivian 1660 - 1670
- Samuel Leek 1670 - 1687
- Joseph Johnson 1687 – 1720
- Robert Marsden 1720 – 1748
- Francis Wanley 1748 – 1791
- William Smelt 1791 – 1823
- Robert Chaplin 1823 - 1837

== The Prebend of Norwell Third Part ==
Also known as Norwell III. The revenues for the Prebend came from estates around Norwell, Norwell Woodhouse and Carlton-upon-Trent.

=== Prebendaries of Norwell Third Part ===
- Paul Dentayicty or Dienteaducty ca 1284
- John ca. 1311
- Henry de Ulseby until 1352
- Thomas de Brembre 1352 – 1353
- John de Northwell 1353
- John Bryde ca. 1371 – ca. 1395
- Thomas Burstall 1402
- William Newport until 1426
- John Bridde 1526
- Thomas Kyng until 1457
- Ralph Bridde 1457 – 1462 (then Oxton II)
- John Averell 1462 – 1475
- William Clayton 1475
- Edmund Chaterton 1475
- William Watson 1476 - 1501
- William Atkinson 1501 – 1509
- Walter Blount 1509 – 1517
- Richard Pygott 1517 – 1523
- John Watson 1523 – 1530
- Richard Tomyew 1530 – 1537
- Thomas Horsley 1537
- Robert Cressy 1559 – 1581
- Luke Gilpin 1581 – 1587
- Robert Grace 1587 – 1612
- John Brown 1612 – 1622
- Thomas Benson 1622
- Henry Brunsell 1660 – 1664
- Samuel Brunsell 1664 – 1687
- Richard Gibson 1687 – 1690
- Charles Palmer 1690 – 1704
- Thomas Lancashire 1704 – 1706
- Hugh Cartwright 1706 – 1721
- Humphrey Bralesford 1721 – 1733
- Edward Gregory 1733 – 1759
- John Dealtary 1759 – 1785
- William Dealtry 1785 – 1834
- Edward Denison 1834

== The Prebend of Woodborough ==
This prebend was also known as Udeborough. The revenues came from lands in the parish of Woodborough.

=== The Prebendaries of Woodborough ===
- Walter Mauclerc ca. 1220
- Simon de Curia Majori or Curte-Major ca. 1387 – ca. 1312
- Robert de Bridlington ca. 1331
- John Godwyks until 1364
- John de Quernbyll 1364 – 1410
- Robert Rolleston 1410 – 1426
- Robert Pekok 1426 – 1447
- John Sutton 1447 – 1450
- John Fisher 1450 – 1452
- John Sutton 1452
- John Lascy 1452 – 1492
- Richard Nykke 1492 – 1497
- Marke Husse or Hussie 1497 – 1499
- John Wygmore 1499
- William Carpenter 1499 – 1507
- George Dudley 1507
- Mathhew Torte 1561 – 1576
- Humphrey Fowler 1576 – 1600
- Thomas Jegon 1600 – 1604
- Edward Hatton 1604 – 1625
- John Chadwyk 1625 – 1631
- Peter Mease 1631
- Francis Leeke 1660 – 1670
- Henry Smith 1671 – 1702
- Eli Stansfield 1702 – 1719
- Robert Ayde 1719 – 1761
- Hon. Robert Sherard 1761 – 1778
- William Becher 1778 – 1821
- Edward Garrard Marsh 1821 - 1862

== The Prebend of North Muskham ==
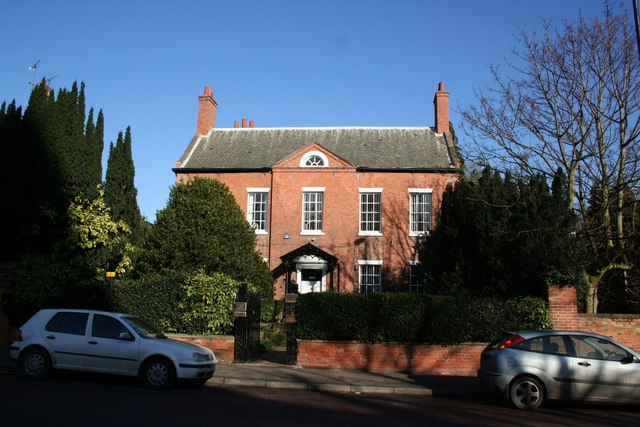
North Muskham Prebendal House

The revenues for this prebend came from lands in North Muskham, Holme and Bathley, and the tithes of the parish of Caunton.

The Prebendal House is now known as Kirkland House, and is a Grade II listed building. It was built around 1810 for the Falkner family, probably incorporating part of a house dating from 1700 in the rear wing.

=== The Prebendaries of North Muskham ===
- Henry of Lexington until 1242
- Richard de Sutton 1242
- Laurence de Brandeston 1268
- Henry of Newark until 1298
- William of Newark 1298 - 1340
- William Boniere de Dixemuth 1340 - 1350
- John de Northwell 1350 - 1353
- Thomas de Brembre 1353
- Thomas de Welton until 1366
- John Chadderton 1366
- John de Newton until 1414
- Henry Bowet 1414
- Thomas Pattesley 1414 - 1418
- Thomas Percy 1418 - 1441
- John Pakenham 1441 - 1445
- Hugh Pakenham 1445 - 1449
- Stephen Wilton 1449 - 1453
- Gervas Clyfton 1453 - 1454
- Robert Clyfton 1454
- John Harding ca. 1470 - 1485
- William Byrley 1485 - 1510
- Richard Pace (or Pacye) 1510 - 1514
- Robert Langton 1514 - 1516
- Thomas Nicholls 1516 - 1526
- William Benet 1526 - 1533
- Henry Williams 1533
- George Palmes 1558 - 1559
- George Ackworth 1559 - 1566
- John Young 1566 - 1589
- Lancelot Andrewes 1589 - 1609
- Roger Andrewes 1609 - 1631
- Henry Willis 1631 - 1678
- Samuel Crowbrow 1678 - 1690
- Thomas Laybourne 1690 - 1728
- Thomas Hayter 1728 - 1750
- Linford Caryl 1750 - 1781
- Richard Barnard 1781 - 1783
- Sir Richard Kaye, 6th Baronet 1783 - 1810
- Samuel Francis Dashwood 1810 - 1826
- Brooke Boothby 1826 - 1829
- Charles Boothby 1829 - 1846

== The Prebend of Oxton ==
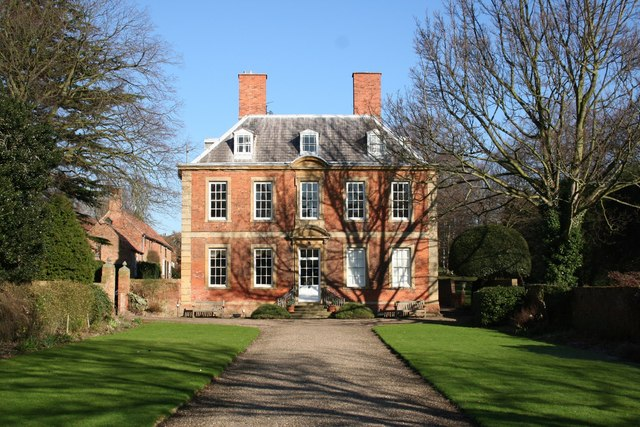
Oxton I Prebendal House

This prebend is also known as Oxton I. The revenues for this prebend came from lands in Oxton, Calverton and Cropwell Bishop, and half the tithes of the parishes of Oxton and Blidworth.

=== The Prebendaries of Oxton ===
- Stephen de Lexinton 1215
- Anglus Jacobi Barthol until 1289
- Johannes Nob. Viri Landulfi de Columna 1289
- William de Melton 1304
- John de Ebroicis 1309 - 1310
- Nicholas de Oxon 1310
- Robert de Nottingham 1323
- Philip de Daventre ca. 1355
- Richard de Norwell until 1365
- Richard de Chesterfield 1365
- Thomas de Oxgrave until 1370
- Thomas de Ikham 1370
- Robert Wolveden until 1404
- John Ixworth 1404 – 1431
- Alexander Holles 1431 – 1461
- Richard Andrew 1461 – 1476
- Edmund Chaterton 1476 – 1485
- William Talbot 1485 – 1498
- William Fitzherbert 1498 – 1514
- William Dragley 1514 – 1538
- Edward Basset 1538
- Henry Harvye 1558 – 1567
- Matthew Hutton 1567 – 1589
- Clement Holder 1589 – 1638
- John Neyle 1638 – 1675
- Richard Hook 1675 - 1688
- George Mompesson 1688 – 1732
- Richard Levett 1732 – 1749
- Hugh Thomas 1749 – 1780
- John Josias Laborde 1780 – 1788
- Nathan Haines 1788 – 1806
- Richard Sutton 1806 – 1820
- James Jarvis Cleaver 1820

== The Prebend of Oxton and Crophyll ==
This prebend is also known as Oxton and Cropwell Bishop, or Oxton II. The revenues for this prebend came from lands in Oxton, Calverton, Cropwell Bishop, and Hickling, and half the tithes of the parishes in Oxton and Blidworth.

=== The Prebendaries of Oxton and Crophyll ===
- William de Clifford ca. 1280
- John de Euroys ca. 1291
- Robert de Nova-Villa until 1327
- Henry de Edenestowe 1327 – 1351
- Henry de Ingleby 1351 – 1375
- John de Dandeby until 1397
- Thomas de Weston 1397
- Thomas de la Warre 1397
- Henry de Codyngton until 1404
- Thomas Moston 1407
- Henry Bowet 1415 – 1416
- William Bothe 1416 – 1421
- John Rider 1421
- John Pakenham until 1442
- Brandus de Castiliona 1442 - 1454
- William Brand 1454 – 1457
- Robert Stillington 1457 – 1459
- Nicholas Gosse 1459 – 1460
- John Sendale 1460 – 1462
- Ralph Brid 1462 – 1470
- John Bower 1470 – 1499
- John Fitzherbert 1499 – ca. 1540s
- Robert ‘Sedis Hullensis episcopus’ 1558 – 1559
- Goddard Kiddall 1559 – 1563
- John Pratt 1563 – 1599
- Richard Remington 1599 – 1607
- Nathaniel Sampson 1607 – 1611
- John Favour 1611 – 1623
- John Favour 1623 - 1660
- William Holder 1660 – 1664
- Thomas Wren 1664 – 1679
- William Stainforth 1679 – 1713
- Samuel Berdmore 1713 – 1742
- Joseph Atwell 1742 – 1768
- John Marsden 1768 – 1796
- Henry Forster Mills 1796 – 1827
- Frederick Anson 1827

== The Prebend of South Muskham ==
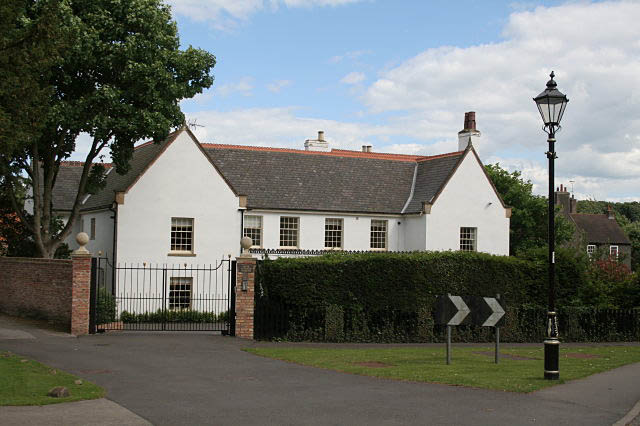
South Muskham Prebendal House

The revenues for this prebend came from lands and tithes in South Muskham.

Dating from the mid 15th century, the former prebendal house of South Muskham was remodelled in the early 18th century and around 1800. A rear addition was added in 1954. It was an old people's home, but is now converted into private apartments. It is Grade II listed.

=== The Prebendaries of South Muskham ===
- William de Markham ca. 1220 – 1240
- William de Senedon or Shendon until 1258
- Thomas 1259
- John de Peniston or Penyngston ca. 1295
- John de Thoresby 1340
- Roger Bacon until 1385
- Thomas Orgrave 1385
- John Tibbey 1396 - 1410
- Thomas Kyngston 1410
- John Cotes de Tenelby 1419
- Richard Feriby until 1443
- William Wytham 1443
- John Wraby 1449 - 1474
- Edmund Chaterton 1474 – 1475
- Thomas Chaundeler 1475 - 1485
- Thomas Stoke 1485 – 1488
- William Skelton 1488 – 1500
- Edward Basset 1500 – 1538
- Richard Lanreth 1538 – 1547
- Edward Brereley 1558 – 1559
- William Tayllor 1559 – 1560
- George Powes 1560 – 1573
- Thomas Wethered 1573 – 1584
- Thomas Wethered 1584 – 1586
- John Cooke 1586 – 1590
- Francis Burgoine 1590 – 1633
- John Neyle 1633 – 1638
- Edward Burby 1638
- Gilbert Benet 1660 – 1669
- Peter Canon 1669 – 1681
- William Foster 1681 – 1704
- John Jackson 1704 – 1706
- Thomas Lancashire 1706 – 1719
- John Lloyd 1719 – 1724
- Robert Dannye 1724 – 1730
- Francis Charleton 1730 – 1734
- Jaques Sterne 1734 – 1755
- Robert Oliver 1755 – 1784
- James Willoughby 1784 – 1816
- Brooke Boothby 1816 – 1818
- John Thomas Becher 1818

== The Prebend of Dunham ==
The revenues for this prebend came from lands and tithes in the parish of Dunham, and a part of the tithes of the parish of Morton.

=== The Prebendaries of Dunham ===
- Nicholas de Wells ca 1302
- Thomas de St Albano 1311 - 1339
- Robert Kildesby 1340 - 1341
- John Wade 1341
- William Kildisby 1341 - 1348
- Henry de Harwedon 1348 - 1349
- Thomas de Helwell 1349
- John de Waltham until 1361
- William de Wykeham 1361
- John Caumpeden until 1410
- John Morhay 1410
- Richard Prentys until 1416
- John Forest 1416 - 1442
- John Bate 1442 - 1478
- Gervas Clifton 1478 - 1479
- James Stanley 1479 - 1485
- Edmund Chaterton 1485 - 1499
- Robert Barra 1499 - 1527
- William Claiburgh 1527 - 1534
- John Brandisby 1534 - 1558
- John Rokebye 1558 - 1573
- Simon Bucke 1573 - 1585
- George Slater 1586 - 1590
- Thomas Painter 1590 - 1614
- John Brooke 1614 - 1615
- Henry Bankes 1615 - 1617
- Toby Willis 1617 - 1618
- William Humphreys 1618 - 1624
- Henry Bates 1624 - 1636
- Barnaby Barlowe 1636 - 1660
- John Fothergill 1660 - 1676
- Robert Feild 1676 - 1680
- Peter Canon 1680 - 1692
- Daniel Chadwick 1692 - 1701
- Edward Clarke 1701 - 1729
- Lewis Stephens 1729 - 1747
- William Herring 1747
- Thomas Herring 1747 - 1774
- Sir Richard Kaye, 6th Baronet 1774 - 1780
- William Jackson 1780 - 1812
- Verney Peter Littlehales 1812
- George Hutchinson 1813 - 1818
- Brooke Boothby 1818 - 1826
- Hon. John Sedley Venables Vernon 1826 - 1829
- Thomas Cozens Percival 1829

== The Prebend of Beckingham ==
The White Book of Southwell shows that Thurstan, Archbishop of York, founded the Prebend of Beckingham between 1120 and 1135. The grant was confirmed in a letter, by King Henry I at Winchester, in 1123. The Prebend of North Leverton was separated out of this in 1291.

The revenue for this prebend came from lands and tithes in Beckingham, and a quarter of the revenue from an estate in Edingley.

=== The Prebendaries of Beckingham ===
- Herbert
- William de Rotherfield
- Reginald de St Albano
- Peter de Dene
- William de Barneby until 1361
- Richard de Renhall until 1400
- John Martyn 1401 - 1404
- Henry Merston 1404 - 1433
- Thomas Chicheley 1433 - 1445
- William Crowton 1445 - 1446
- John Suthwell 1446 - 1480
- Oliver Kyng 1480 - 1492
- William Carpenter 1494 - 1496
- Nicholas Halswell 1496 - 1499
- William Symonds 1499 - 1505
- George Savage 1505 - 1535?
- John Stokes 1564 - 1568
- Thomas Wightman 1568 - 1580
- Christopher Gregory 1580 - 1592
- Christopher Gregory 1592 - 1600
- Christopher Nelson 1600 - 1620
- Henry Wickham 1620
- Robert Sanderson ca. 1642 - 1660
- Paul Hood 1660 - 1661
- Henry Parkhurst 1661 - 1669
- Benjamin Camfield 1669 - 1693
- Clement Elis 1693 - 1700
- John Pigot 1700 - 1727
- Edward Wilson 1727 - 1753
- Thomas Cockshut 1753 - 1774
- Henry Watkins 1774 - 1830
- Thomas Henry Shepherd 1830 - 1873

== The Prebend of Halloughton ==
The revenues for this prebend came from a tithe of the lands of Halloughton. It was founded ca. 1160 by Roger, Archbishop of York.

=== The Prebendaries of Halloughton ===
- Roger de Capella ca 1160
- Thomas Britton ca 1240 - 1269
- William de Grenefeld 1269 - 1272
- Adam de Bolestrede 1272
- Nicholas de Knovill until 1310
- Lambert de Trikyngham 1310
- Robert de Kildesby 1341 - 1348
- William de Hugate 1348
- James de Staunton ca 1371 - ca 1395
- John Lyott 1398
- John Messanger until 1406
- William Aston 1406
- Henry Swayne 1423 - 1425
- John Markaunt 1425
- William Grave until 1450
- Edmund Warter 1450
- Walter Waretyr until 1497
- Brian Sandford 1497 - 1520
- John Maxe (or Maxey) 1520 - 1536
- Richard Dean 1536 - 1558
- William Mowse 1559
- William Underne 1576
- Humphrey Tindall 1588 - 1599
- Robert Snoden 1599 - 1616
- Richard Johnson 1616 - 1624
- George Brittan 1624 - 1632
- Peter Titley 1632 - 1633
- Edward Quarles 1633 - 1639
- Robert Holder 1639
- William Gery 1660 - 1668
- Henry Bagshaw 1668 - 1670
- John Lake 1670 - 1682
- Barnaby Long 1682 - 1685
- Roger Altham 1685 - 1714
- Timothy Fenton 1714 - 1724
- Edward Parker 1724 - 1754
- William Caley 1754 - 1784
- James Willoughby 1784 - 1784
- Francis Herbert Hume 1785 - 1806
- Robert Philip Goodenough 1806 - 1826
- Frederick Anson 1826 - 1827
- John Rudd 1827 - 1834
- Robert Lowe 1834

== The Prebend of Rampton ==
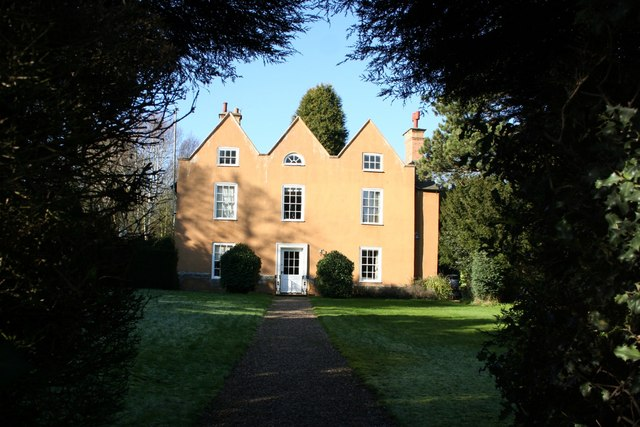
Rampton Prebendal House

The revenues for this prebend came from land and tithes in Rampton.

The former prebendal house dates from the early 17th century. It was rendered and defenestrated in the late 18th century, and includes late 19th century additions. It is Grade II listed.

=== The Prebendaries of Rampton ===
- Reginald de Stowe ca. 1263 - 1267
- Henry de Corbrigge 1267
- Galfrid de Sancto Medardo until 1291
- William Bevercotes 1314 – 1347
- Reginald de Hillington until 1374
- John Stoke 1374
- John de Waltham until 1383
- Nicholas de Heth 1383
- Thomas Haxey 1405 – 1425
- Richard Caudray 1425 – 1431
- William Gray 1431 – 1438
- Robert Thwaytes 1438
- Thomas Tonge until 1454
- John Gysburgh 1454 - 1459
- John Ranald 1459 – 1474
- Edmund Litchfield 1474
- John Doget 1474 – 1488
- William Fitzherbert 1488 - 1498
- Richard Ratcliffe 1498 – 1527
- William Clayburgh 1527 – 1535
- Thomas Westby 1527
- Thomas Marshall 1558
- Richard Drury 1559 - 1561
- Edward Roodes 1561 – 1573
- Nicholas Clayton 1573 – 1596
- Roger Acroyde 1596 – 1601
- John Hutton 1601 – 1612
- Thomas Ireland 1612 – 1614
- George Proctor 1614 – 1625
- Richard Marsh 1625 – 1663
- George Parish 1663 – 1688
- Robert Banks 1688 – 1695
- Timothy Caryl 1695 – 1721
- Henry Cooke 1721 – 1750
- Edward Chappell 1750 – 1767
- John Marsden 1767 – 1768
- Samuel Abson 1768 – 1777
- Peter Peckard 1777 – 1798
- Richard Sutton 1798 – 1806
- Edward Auriol Hay-Drummond 1806
- Fitzgerald Wintour 1830

== The Prebend of Eton ==
This prebend was also known as Eaton or Idleton. The revenues came from lands and tithes within the parish.

=== The Prebendaries of Eton ===
- Gerard de Seseriaco 1289
- John de Barneby ca 1332
- Thomas de Riplyngham until 1434
- Gilbert de Welton 1343
- Nicholas Calton 1408
- John Cleve until 1458
- Thomas Wymbish (or Wymbussch) 1458 - 1477
- John Tram 1477 - 1480
- Robert Frank 1480 - 1486
- Robert Grimston 1486 - 1501
- Thomas Fitzherbert 1501 - 1528
- William Langforth 1528 - 1533
- Matthew Witton 1533
- Robert Snell 1559 - 1570?
- John Todde 1572 - 1588
- George Higgin 1588 - 1624
- Francis Withington 1624 - 1642?
- Robert Pare 1660 - 1675
- Jeremiah Cudworth 1675 - 1704
- John Gee 1704 - 1713
- Robert Marsden 1713 - 1720 - 1749
- Scrope Berdmore 1749 - 1769
- Scrope Berdmore 1769 - 1814
- William Barrow 1815 -

== The Prebend of North Leverton ==
Originally part of Beckingham, it was separated into a separate prebend in 1291. The revenue for this prebend came from the lands and tithes in North Leverton.

=== The Prebendaries of North Leverton ===
- Benedict de Halum 1291
- Reynaldus Arnaldi de Rana 1307
- William de South Leverton ca. 1344
- John Marshall until 1365
- John de Appleby 1365
- John Stretley 1365
- John Soulby 1413
- Richard Moresbyll 1413 - 1416
- William Hayton 1416
- Elyas Holgate 1444
- John Sutton 1444
- Richard Tone until 1447
- John Porter 1447 - 1448
- Alexander Prowet 1448 - 1471
- John Barnby 1471 - 1498
- John Wygmore 1498 - 1499
- William Symonds 1499
- Thomas Gree 1499 - 1505
- Thomas Dalby 1505 - 1526
- Robert Nooke 1526 - 1529
- Nicholas Lentall 1529
- Thomas Marcer 1529
- George Lambe 1559
- John Taverham 1562 - 1573
- James Brittan 1574 - 1592
- John Barkesdale 1592
- Martin Horberie 1660 - 1672
- Edward Mason 1672 - 1678
- John Mason 1678 - 1685
- William Porter 1685 - 1715
- William Howson 1715 - 1721
- Richard Wood 1721 - 1734
- Bennet Sherard 1734 - 1753
- Granville Wheeler 1753 - 1770
- Thomas Porter 1770 - 1800
- Samuel Smith 1800 - 1807
- Henry Smith 1807
