= Norwell, Nottinghamshire =

Village and civil parish in Nottinghamshire, England

Coordinates: 53.1472°N 0.8486°W

Norwell
- Village and civil parish
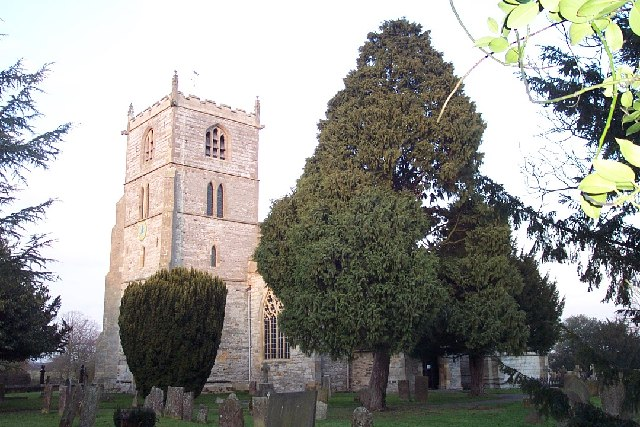
- St Laurence's Church, Norwell

- Location within Nottinghamshire
- Interactive map of Norwell
- Area: 4.71 sq mi (12.2 km^{2})
- Population: 470 (2021)
  - Density: 100/sq mi (39/km^{2})
- OS grid reference: SK 7761
  - London: 115 mi (185 km) SSE
- District: Newark and Sherwood
- Shire county: Nottinghamshire
- Region: East Midlands
- Country: England
- Sovereign state: United Kingdom
- Settlements: Norwell; Norwell Woodhouse
- Post town: Newark
- Postcode district: NG23
- Dialling code: 01636
- Police: Nottinghamshire
- Fire: Nottinghamshire
- Ambulance: East Midlands
- UK Parliament: Newark
- Website: www.hugofox.com/community/norwell-parish-council-20448/home

Norwell is a village and civil parish about 6 miles (9.7 km) from Newark-on-Trent, in central Nottinghamshire, England. The population (including Norwell Woodhouse) at the 2011 census was 490, this declined to 470 at the 2021 census. It is close to the border with Lincolnshire and the River Trent, and lies approximately 1.5 miles (2.4 km) from the A1 road and 1 mile (1.6 km) from the East Coast Main Line.

== History ==
=== Early history ===
"Nortwelle" is mentioned in the Domesday Book of 1086; it then had a church, a priest and a watermill. The parish consists of Norwell, Norwell Woodhouse, and the now deserted village of Willoughby. For nearly a thousand years the parish of Norwell was owned by the church. Rents from land and houses were used to finance three canons (or prebendaries) of Southwell. The canons were the principal landlords and lived in moated manor houses: Overhall, Palishall and Tertia Pars. In the Middle Ages some prebendaries were national figures, such as Robert de Wodehouse (died 1346) who became treasurer of England.

=== Farming ===
In other respects Norwell was a typical farming community. Traces of the medieval open fields, with their ridge and furrow, may still be seen. Major changes followed parliamentary enclosure (1832) when the land was divided into small fields. Many small farms, possibly 28, were established, some in the village centre and others in outlying fields. Today there are a few large farms and no working farms in the village centre. Some old farmyards in the village like Church, Willoughby and Hill farms have been developed for new homes.

=== Self-sufficiency ===
19th century Norwell was almost self-sufficient. Blacksmiths, wheelwrights, stonemasons, and builders were often grouped together in yards leading off the main street. There were two windmills, two steam mills and a watermill. For a time Norwell had its own brickworks. Personal needs were met by General stores, bakers and butchers, shoemakers and a tailor. There were at least three public houses; The Black Horse, The Crown (later The Elephant and Castle) and The Plough. Norwell has had a school since 1727.

=== Buildings ===
The medieval church of St Laurence is Grade I listed and has features from the 12th to the 20th century. Almost all of the buildings are of red brick with pantiles. There are many timber-framed buildings originally with mud and stud between the timbers. Most are now entirely encased in brick but the timber can still be seen internally. There are a few striking 19th-century houses, most of which were built by Henry Clipsham, the Norwell builder who also restored the Church. A windmill and distinctive circular pinfold can still be seen.

=== Norwell now ===
The population of the parish is about 470, much as it was around 1250 and 1700. It reached its peak in the 1860s when it was nearly 800.

== Norwell Buildings ==
=== St. Laurence Church ===
==== Brief history ====
The first church in Norwell was almost certainly a wooden one, probably erected as a chapel attached to an Anglo-Saxon manor house standing on or near where a later moated manor house was built, immediately to the south of the present church. This may have been the church, with its priest, mentioned in the Domesday Book, but no traces of that chapel or church remain. Shortly after 1100 it was certainly replaced by a small rectangular building like that surviving at Littleborough, Nottinghamshire. Fragmented masonry associated with this first stone church has been identified in the north aisle.

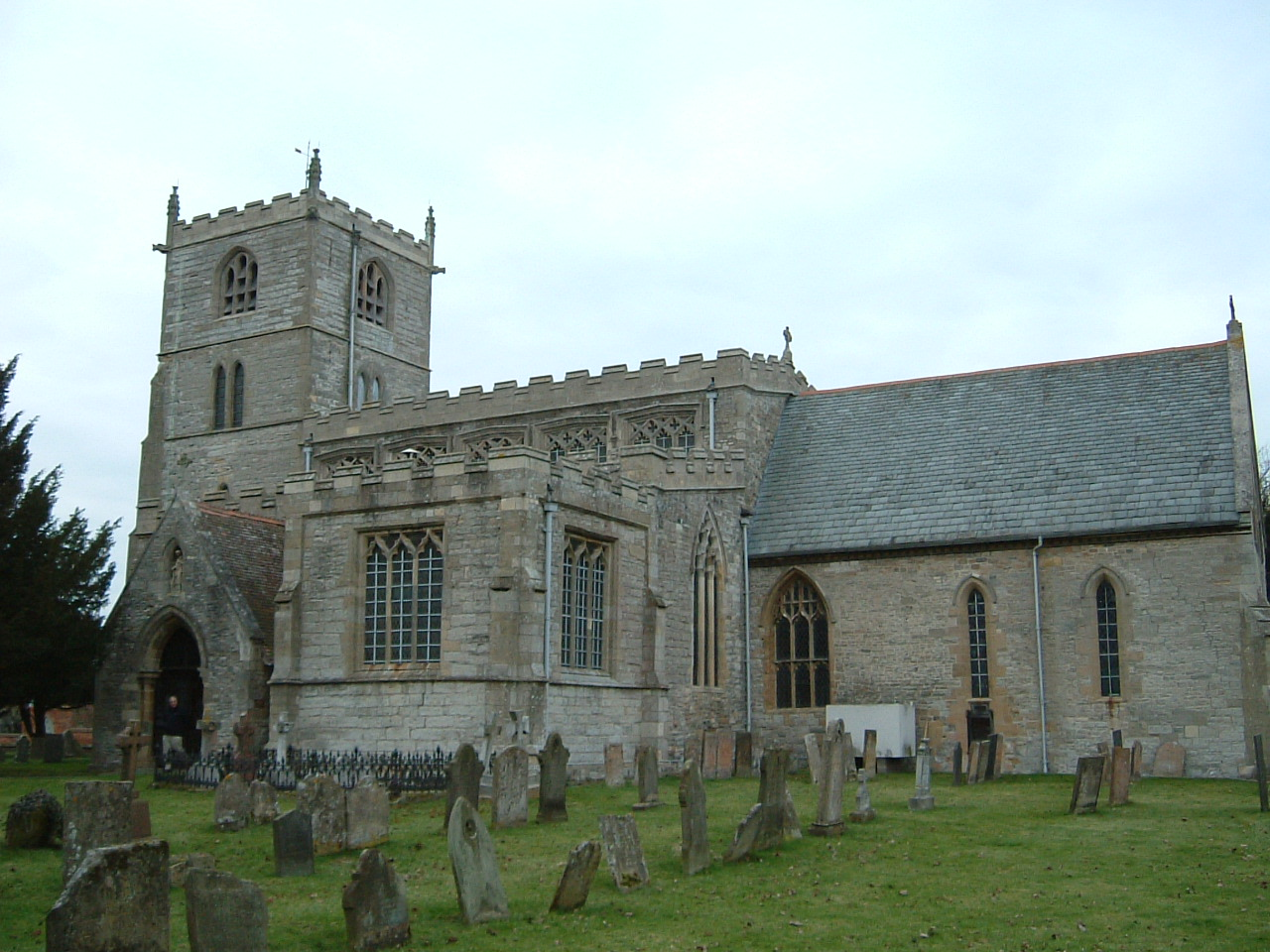
St Laurence's Church, Norwell

During the 12th and 13th centuries other traces were lost through major work creating the church we now see. Around 1180–1200, the south aisle was added and the south door moved to its present position. A tower with three storeys was built shortly after 1200 and by 1250 the north aisle was added. A further expansion took place around 1300, partly paid for by a legacy from Mr John Clarell, prebendary of Overhall (d.1295). The north and south transepts were added, the Chancel lengthened and, a few years later, the south porch built. Finally between about 1450 and 1500, the nave was heightened with a clerestory (a row of flat-headed windows) inserted, the transepts and Chancel were re-roofed, and a fourth storey with battlements and gargoyles was added to the tower. The 19th-century, largely sympathetic, restoration (Chancel, 1857-8, rest of church, 1872-5) by Ewan Christian faithfully preserves St Laurence's medieval appearance. The only major structural change was that Christian restored the Chancel to its 13th-century form by removing the low-pitched roof that was part of the 15th-century refurbishment.

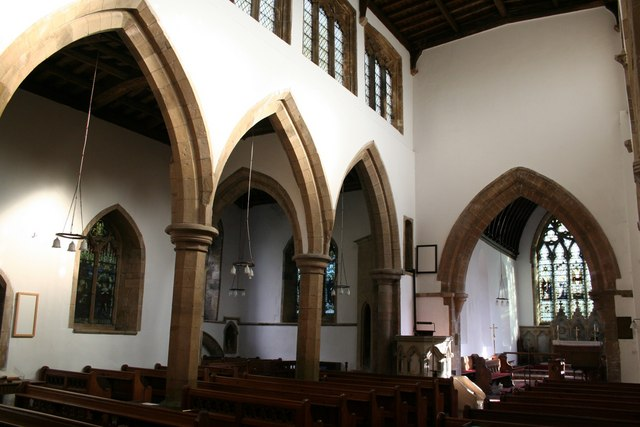
St Laurence's Church, Norwell

Evidence from the church shows the wide variety of stone available in medieval Norwell. Much of the building is constructed in skerry, a form of pale grey sandstone, quarried locally at Tuxford, Laxton, Kneesall and Maplebeck. Magnesium limestone was brought from Mansfield and other limestone came from Ancaster in Lincolnshire, whilst local lias from Collingham and a light porous tufa, which outcrops in The Beck between Norwell and Caunton, has been identified. For high-quality monuments like tombs and effigies, stone was sometimes imported over much longer distances, like the Purbeck marble and Caen stone also present.

=== Methodist Chapel ===
The Primitive Methodist Chapel was built on land donated by Revd W.Sturtevant in 1827. In 1843 this chapel was bought by the Wesleyans, who re-opened it on 6 November. This flourished and was enlarged in 1909, with a school room built by Henry Clipsham & Sons at a cost of £337. It became a private house in 1991.

=== The Pinfold ===
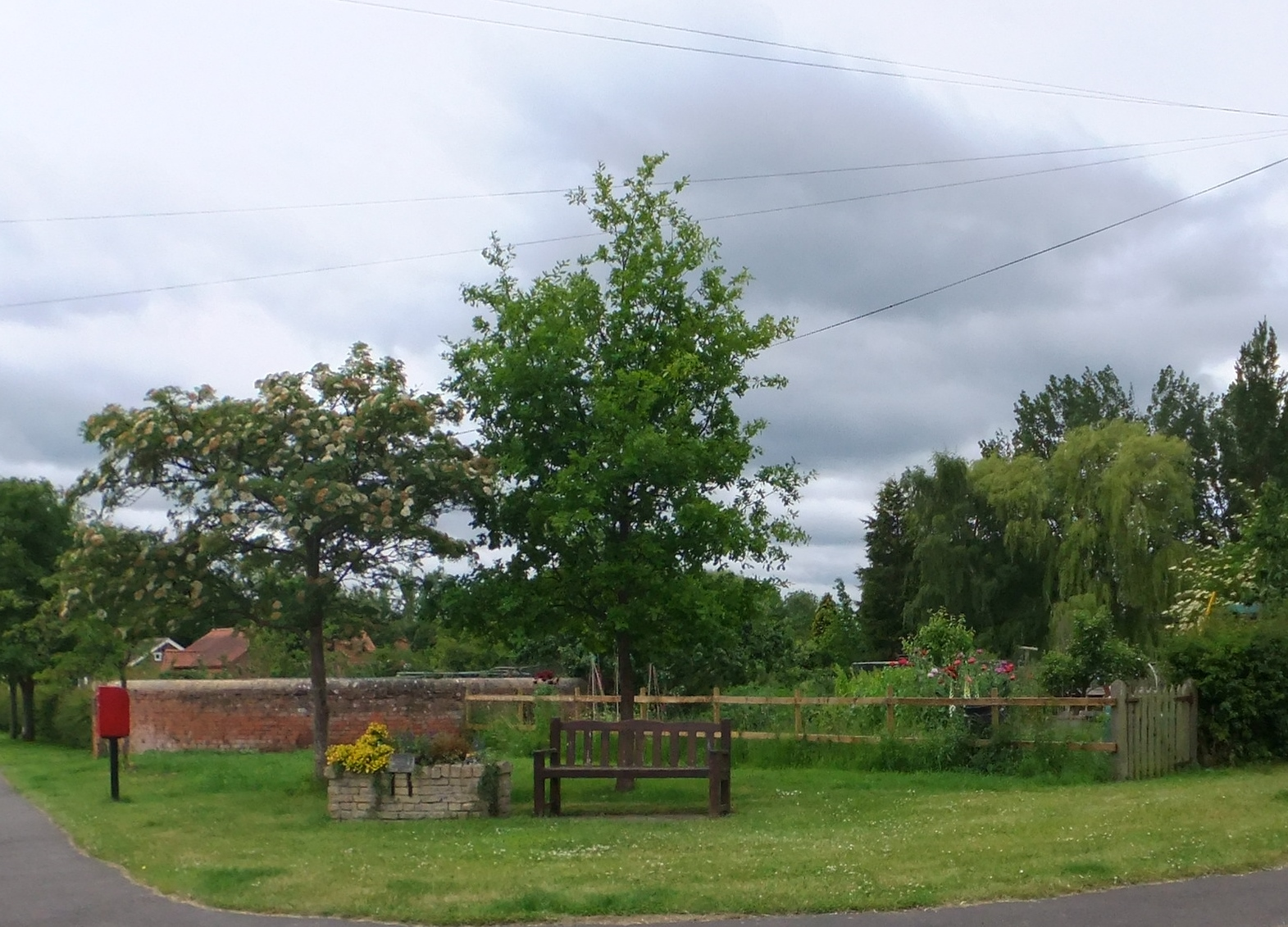
Norwell Pinfold

The village pinfold or pound is located on Bathley Lane (west side) close to its junction with Main Street and Woodhouse Road. The 18th century circular structure is of brick with half round ashlar copings with a pair of square gate pillars with ashlar capitals. The wooden gate is 20th century. The pinfold is approximately 10m (33') in diameter and is reputedly the largest round pinfold in the county (Nottinghamshire).

The structure is Grade II listed by Historic England (listing number 1045950).

An attached plaque carries the inscription:

PINFOLD
BUILT CIRCA 1830
TO REPLACE AN EARLIER
WOODEN PINFOLD USED TO
PEN STRAY ANIMALS WHICH
COULD THEN BE RECLAIMED
ON PAYMENT OF A FINE
TO THE PINDER
[Signed] NORWELL PARISH COUNCIL

== Transport ==
=== Road ===
Norwell roads including Main Street, Carlton Road, Ossington Road, Bathley Lane and Woodhouse Road are unclassified. The speed limit through the village is 30 mph with an advisory 20 mph along part of Main Street due to the proximity of the school.

The A1 Trunk Road (Cromwell Bypass) passes the parish approximately 1.5 miles to the east of Norwell. Although not within the parish it is of interest that Cromwell Bypass was the location of highly collaborative trials of the slip-form paver in 1964/65. The first such machine to be brought into the UK was used to trial the laying of unreinforced and reinforced concrete carriageways with dowelled contraction and expansion joints. The surface has now been rebuilt using tarmac (asphalt concrete). The A616 road passes approximately 2 miles to the west of Norwell.

=== Rail ===
The East Coast Main Line crosses the east of the parish in an approximately north/south direction, passing approximately 1 mile to the east of the village itself.

The nearest railway stations are in Newark-on-Trent, seven miles to the south-east. Newark North Gate is located on the East Coast Main Line, between London King's Cross and Edinburgh Waverley, and Newark Castle is located on the Nottingham to Lincoln line.

== See also ==
- Listed buildings in Norwell
