= Acworth =

Acworth may refer to:

== People ==
- Acworth (surname)

== Places ==
- Acworth, Georgia, US
  - Lake Acworth, lake in Acworth, Georgia
- Acworth, New Hampshire, US

== See also ==
- Ackworth (disambiguation)
