= Ossington Preceptory =

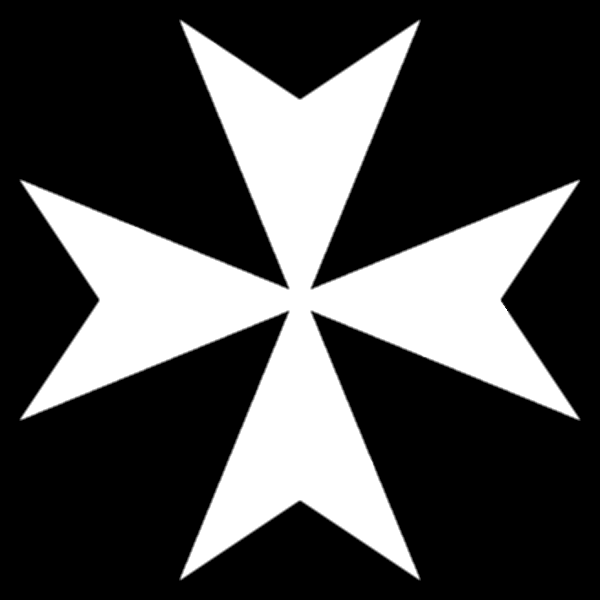
- Cross of the Knights Hospitallier

- Location within Nottinghamshire
- Interactive map of Ossington Preceptory

Monastery information
- Other name: Ossington Hospitallers Preceptory
- Order: Knights Hospitaller
- Established: Mid-12th Century
- Disestablished: 1534
- Mother house: From 1382: Newland Preceptory

Site
- Location: Ossington, Nottinghamshire, England
- Coordinates: 53.178096°N 0.865726°W
- Visible remains: None

Ossington Preceptory was a preceptory of the Knights Hospitaller, near to the village of Ossington in Nottinghamshire, England.

== History ==
=== Foundation and endowment ===
The preceptory was founded in the mid-12th century. At, or shortly after foundation, "Archbishop William" (probably Saint William FitzHerbert, Archbishop of York; 1143–54) granted the preceptory the church at Ossington. At sometime before 1199 the churches at Averham and Winkburn, both in Nottinghamshire, were donated by Henry Hosatus.

Towards the end of the 12th century, the village of Ossington was granted to the preceptory by Roger de Buron. However, later in his life Roger joined the Cluniac Order, and bestowed the village on Lenton Priory. This caused "considerable litigation" between the two monasteries. In 1204 Roger's son, Walter Smallet, confirmed the grant of Ossington to the preceptory, but Lenton did not drop their claim until 1208.

By 1230 the preceptory had also gained the churches at Marnham and Sibthorpe, as their right to them was confirmed in that year by Walter de Gray, Archbishop of York.

=== Later history ===
In 1338 the preceptory is recorded as having an annual income of £85 8s. 8d. and outgoings of £77 7s. At the time there were only two knights in residence (one of whom was Preceptor).

Ossington controlled Winkburn Camera. A camera is "A residence used during short visits by an official and attendants of the Knights Hospitallers for administrative purposes on their estates."

In 1382 Ossington Preceptory was merged with the larger Newland Preceptory in Yorkshire.

=== Dissolution ===
In the Valor Ecclesiasticus of 1534 "Ossington Bailiwick" is listed as generating £20 annually for Newland; Winkburn generated £19.

The preceptory was dissolved in 1534 as part of King Henry VIII's dissolution of the monasteries.

== After Dissolution ==
In 1782 Holy Rood Church, Ossington was built. It is thought to stand on, or very near to, the original site of the Preceptory church.
