= Norwell Woodhouse =

Coordinates: 53.156°N 0.891°W

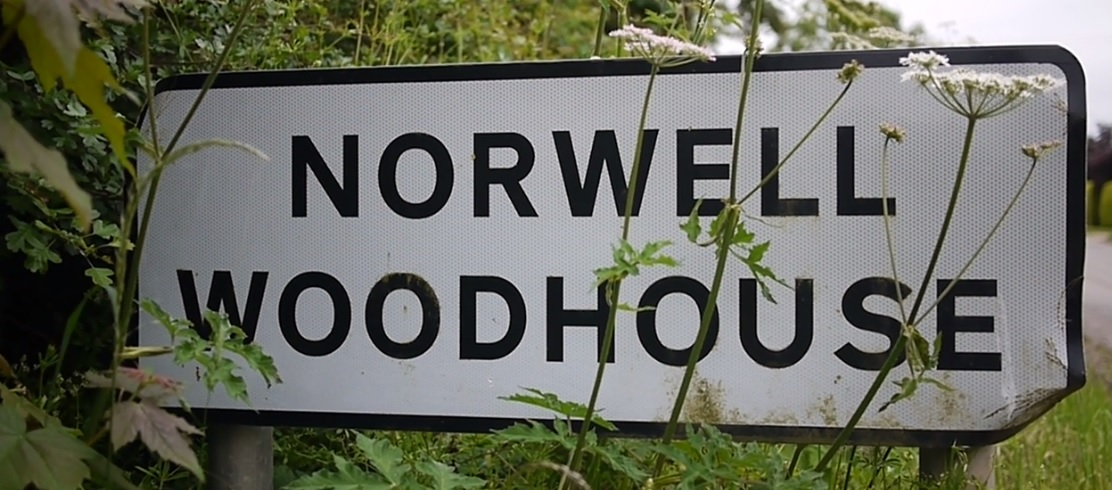
- Norwell Woodhouse village sign

- Location within Nottinghamshire
- Civil parish: Norwell
- District: Newark and Sherwood
- Shire county: Nottinghamshire
- Region: East Midlands
- Country: England
- Sovereign state: United Kingdom

Norwell Woodhouse is a small village and former civil parish, now in the parish of Norwell, in the Newark and Sherwood district, in the county of Nottinghamshire, England. It is close to the villages of Caunton, Kneesall, Cromwell and Laxton and around 8 miles (13 km) from Newark-on-Trent. In 1931 the parish had a population of 69.

== History ==
The early history of Norwell Woodhouse is undocumented. It is generally accepted that by 1069, Norwell and its three prebends (Norwell Woodhouse, Middlethorpe and Willoughby) were in existence. Norwell, known as "Northwell" at the time, is thought to have been named such to distinguish it from Southwell.

Norwell Woodhouse belonged to the Chapel of Southwell Minster for over 1000 years until it was abolished in 1841. The village was known as Northwell Woodhouse when William de Melton, the prebendary of Southwell, was granted free warren there in 1309. Later, in 1323, a Charter Roll records Robert De Wodehouse (also known as Robert Wodehouse) claiming free warren in the village. Wodehouse was born in Norwell Woodhouse and later went on to become Chancellor of the Exchequer in 1330.

Norwell Woodhouse was formerly a township in the parish of Norwell, from 1866 Norwell Woodhouse was a civil parish in its own right, on 1 April 1935 the parish was abolished and merged with Norwell.

== Population and Industry ==
The population of Norwell Woodhouse was at its peak in 1844 when there were 156 residents. Today, there are far fewer people living in the village, estimated to be less than 100 in 25 properties.

Population decline in the late 19th century has been linked to a number of poor harvests and increased grain imports from the United States. The industrial boom around this time also offered higher wages than agricultural work, and people moved from rural areas to cities in search of work.

During its peak, Norwell Woodhouse was home to two beerhouses, a hawker, tailor, cottager, carpenter, blacksmith and butcher. A number of the original buildings are still standing today; the old blacksmith's building is next to the telephone box in the centre of the village.

== Heritage ==
In 1370, the Parish of Norwell owned several moated manor houses in Norwell Woodhouse. One moated site still remains, and is protected by Historic England.

Local builder Henry Clipsham used West Moreland slate from Southwell Minster on the roof of Lower Grove Farm in Norwell Woodhouse around 1870.
