= Ackworth =

Ackworth may refer to:

- Ackworth, West Yorkshire, England
  - Ackworth railway station, closed many years ago
- Ackworth, Iowa, US

== See also ==
- Acworth (disambiguation)
