= Listed buildings in Ossington =

Ossington is a civil parish in the Newark and Sherwood district of Nottinghamshire, England. The parish contains ten listed buildings that are recorded in the National Heritage List for England. Of these, one is listed at Grade I, the highest of the three grades, one is at Grade II*, the middle grade, and the others are at Grade II, the lowest grade. The parish contains the village of Ossington and the surrounding countryside. One of the most important buildings in the parish was Ossington Hall, but this was demolished in 1963. There are two surviving buildings associated with the hall that are listed, namely a memorial well head, and the gates and walls at the entrance to the grounds. The only building listed at Grade I is Holy Rood Church, and its gateway and a sundial in the churchyard are also listed. The other listed buildings consist of houses, farmhouses and farm buildings, and a war memorial.

== Key ==
Grade	Criteria
I	Buildings of exceptional interest, sometimes considered to be internationally important
II*	Particularly important buildings of more than special interest
II	Buildings of national importance and special interest

== Buildings ==
Name and location	Photograph	Date	Notes	Grade
Sundial; 53.17830°N 0.86502°W		Early 17th century	The sundial is in the churchyard of Holy Rood Church to the east of the church. It is in stone, and consists of a Tuscan column on a chamfered octagonal base of three steps, it has a square base, and a cubic top with four dials and a moulded cornice. The sundial is surmounted by a dwarf obelisk and a ball finial with an ecliptic ring.	II*
3 Main Street; 53.17337°N 0.87014°W		18th century	A brick cottage with cogged eaves, and a pantile roof with a single coped gable and kneelers. There are two storeys and an L-shaped plan, with a front of two bays, and a single-bay extension on the left. In the centre is a gabled porch, and the windows are casements.	II
North Park Farm House and farm buildings 53.18643°N 0.87004°W	—	18th century	The farmhouse is in brick with dentilled eaves and a pantile roof. There are two storeys and an L-shaped plan, with a south front of two bays. The doorway has a segmental head, and the windows are a mix of casements, and horizontally-sliding sashes, some with segmental heads. The farm buildings have four bays, and the openings include barn doors, stable doors, vents, and a casement window, and to the left is a shed with a pitching hole and vents.	II
Ossington House; 53.17468°N 0.86892°W		18th century	A small country house in brick on a plinth, with a floor band, and tile roofs with stone coped gables and kneelers. There are two storeys and attics, a square plan and a west wing, a south front of six bays, and an east front of five bays. In the south front is a central doorway with a segmental head, in the north front is a doorway with a moulded surround and a pediment on scrolled brackets, and the east front contains a doorway with a beaded surround and a moulded hood on curved brackets. Most of the windows are sashes, and in the east front are three gabled dormers.	II
Park Lidget Farm House and farm building 53.16674°N 0.85456°W	—	18th century	The farmhouse is in brick with dentilled eaves, and roofs of pantile and tile with coped gables and kneelers. There are two storeys and an L-shaped plan, with fronts of six bays. On the east front is a doorway with a fanlight, the north front contains a porch, and the windows are a mix of sashes and casements. The adjoining farm buildings have a similar mix of windows, and stable doors, one with a segmental head.	II
Holy Rood Church; 53.17814°N 0.86570°W		1782–84	The church, designed by John Carr in Classical style, is in stone with a slate roof. It consists of a nave and a chancel under a continuous roof, a south porch, a south vestry, and a west tower. The tower has three stages, the bottom stage containing round-headed sash windows on three sides and a cornice band. The middle stage has rebated corners, a cornice, and a round opening on each side, and the top stage contains round-headed louvred bell openings, a lintel band, and a cornice on three Doric columns at each corner. The tower is surmounted by a drum with round-headed openings on the east and west, a clock on the south, and a round louvred opening on the west, and on the top is a stone dome with a ball finial and a wind vane. The porch has Doric columns, antae, and a dentilled pediment, and it contains a round-headed doorway with a moulded surround and a fanlight. The windows are round-headed in rebated recesses, and there is a lintel band.	I
Boundary wall and gate, Holy Rood Church; 53.17792°N 0.86611°W		19th century	Flanking the entrance to the churchyard is a pair of stone gate piers, and between them are a wrought iron gate and a wrought iron overthrow with a lantern. The boundary wall is in brick with stone saddleback and half-round coping, and it extends for 150 metres (490 ft).	II
Boundary wall, railing, gate piers and gate, Ossington Hall; 53.17529°N 0.86147°W		Mid 19th century	The gate piers flanking the entrance to the drive are in stone, they are square, and each pier has a plinth, panels, a modillion cornice, and a fluted urn on a stepped square base, and between them is a pair of spiked iron gates. Outside these are dwarf curved walls with spiked railings, ending in square stone piers with moulded plinths, stepped capitals and ball finials. The boundary walls are in brick with stone cladding and coping, and they are curved at the ends.	II
Monumental well, Ossington Hall; 53.17570°N 0.86139°W		1877	The memorial to Edward Denison is in the form of a well head. It is in stone with a concave patterned tile roof., and contains terracotta panels designed by John Birnie Philip. The memorial is octagonal, with a base of three steps, and four Tuscan columns carrying an octagonal canopy with a terracotta panelled frieze and a modillion cornice, and on the roof is an iron finial. Inside is a canted well head with a windlass and inscribed tablets.	II
War memorial 53.17421°N 0.86873°W		c. 1920	The war memorial is in an enclosure by a road junction. It is in stone, and consists of a square chest on a chamfered square plinth, with recessed inscribed panels on three sides. On this is a shrine with a moulded gable, and a cusped opening containing a crucifix. On the plinth of the shrine is an inscription.	II
