= Listed buildings in Caunton =

Caunton is a civil parish in the Newark and Sherwood district of Nottinghamshire, England. The parish contains twelve listed buildings that are recorded in the National Heritage List for England. Of these, one is listed at Grade I, the highest of the three grades, and the others are at Grade II, the lowest grade. The parish contains the village of Caunton and the surrounding countryside, and the listed buildings consist of houses, farmhouses and associated structures, a church, a former windmill, and a war memorial.

== Key ==
Grade	Criteria
I	Buildings of exceptional interest, sometimes considered to be internationally important
II	Buildings of national importance and special interest

== Buildings ==
Name and location	Photograph	Date	Notes	Grade
St Andrew's Church; 53.13225°N 0.88698°W		12th century	The church has been altered and extended through the centuries, and was restored in 1869 by Ewan Christian. It is built in stone with Cumberland slate roofs, and consists of a nave with a clerestory, north and south aisles, a south porch, a chancel and a west tower. The tower has a moulded plinth, two stages, a string course, a west doorway with a moulded surround and a hood mould, lancet windows, clock faces, two-light bell openings, an eaves band with four gargoyles, and a moulded embattled parapet.	I
Beesthorpe Hall and cottage 53.13645°N 0.91039°W		17th century	A country house, it was remodelled and stuccoed in 1770–71, and wings were added in 1809 and 1815. It is built in stone and brick, on a plinth, with a floor band, an eaves band, and roofs of slate and tile with coped parapets and gables, ball finials and urns. The main range has two storeys and attics, and seven bays, with flanking single-storey three-bay wings. The middle three bays are recessed, and contain a Doric porch with a pediment. The outer two bays on each side are gabled, the windows are sashes, and in the roof are two pedimented dormers. The south front contains four French windows, and at the rear is a stair turret. To the right is a 19th-century cottage with two storeys and two bays.	II
Caunton Grange; 53.13163°N 0.88503°W		Early 18th century	The house, which was remodelled and extended in about 1785, is in brick with stone dressings, chamfered eaves and a hipped tile roof. There are three storeys and an L-shaped plan, with a front range of three bays, and a rear extension. In the centre is a Doric portico with four columns and a pediment, and a doorway with a fanlight. The windows on the front are sashes with splayed lintels and keystones, and on the south front are casement windows, and sashes with segmental heads.	II
Stables, Beesthorpe Hall; 53.13675°N 0.91051°W	—	Early 18th century	The stables are in brick on a stone plinth, with cogged eaves and a hipped tile roof. There are two storeys and five bays, and in the centre is a pedimented coped gable with ball finials, and a clock in the pediment. The middle bay projects, and has a two-storey round-headed recess containing a stable door with a fanlight. The doorways and windows, have segmental heads.	II
Caunton Manor House, outbuildings and cottage 53.13174°N 0.88939°W	—	Early 18th century	The manor house was enlarged and altered in about 1902, and further enlarged and refronted in the 1920s by Percy Houfton. It is in brick on a chamfered plinth, with stone dressings, a floor band, modillion eaves, and roofs of slate and tile. There are three storeys and an irregular L-shaped plan, with fronts of nine and four bays. The central bay of the south front projects under a pediment, and has a doorway with a moulded surround, a shaped fanlight, a dentilled cornice, foliated brackets, a keystone and a pediment, and the windows are sashes. On the east front is a porch with a moulded plinth, channelled rustication, a pulvinated frieze, a modillion cornice, an open pediment, and a stepped parapet. The doorway has Tuscan columns, a fanlight, and a stepped keystone. Adjoining the rear of the house is a cottage and outbuildings.	II
Rose garden gate, Caunton Manor; 53.13175°N 0.88990°W	—	18th century	The garden gates and gate piers are in wrought iron. The piers are square and latticed, and between them is an elaborate overthrow with an inscribed cartouche, and a pair of scrolled gates.	II
Caunton Common Farm House; 53.14775°N 0.91473°W		c. 1800	The farmhouse is in brick with cogged eaves, and a pantile roof with coped gables. There are three storeys and an L-shaped plan, with a front range of three bays, and a rear wing with two storeys and two bays. In the centre is a doorway with a reeded surround, a decorative fanlight, and a dentilled open pediment on curved brackets. The doorway is flanked by canted bay windows, and in the upper floors are sash windows with splayed lintels and keystones.	II
Sundial, Caunton Manor; 53.13164°N 0.88883°W	—	c. 1815	The sundial is in stone, and has a moulded base and stem, and a moulded cornice with bronze dial. On two faces of the stem are lion masks, another side is blank, and on the fourth side is an inscription.	II
Windmill; 53.13555°N 0.89135°W		Early 19th century	The former windmill is in red brick with blue brick banding and cogged eaves. It consists of a tapering round tower with four stages, and is 43 feet (13 m) high. The doorways and windows, which are casements, have segmental heads, and there are stone steps with a kennel beneath.	II
Wall and gates, Caunton Manor; 53.13204°N 0.88840°W	—	19th century	The boundary wall is in brick, with stepped stone coping and intermediate buttresses, and is about 300 metres (980 ft) long. It curves in towards the gateway to meet square brick gate piers with moulded stone capitals and ball finials. Between the piers is a pair of wrought iron gates.	II
War memorial 53.13205°N 0.88777°W		1920	The war memorial is set into the wall of the churchyard of St Andrew's Church adjacent to its entrance. It is built in stones taken from the chancel of the church when it was restored in 1869. The memorial has a roughly pedimented cap and an iron Celtic cross. There is an inscription carved along one of the lower courses of the wall, and higher is a bronze plaque with an inscription and the names of the local men lost in the First World War.	II
Terrace wall and urns, Caunton Manor; 53.13165°N 0.88956°W	—	c. 1926	The terrace wall is in brick on a plinth, with stone coping, and intermediate panelled piers. On the south side are semicircular steps flanked by marble figures. There are six terracotta gadrooned urns, and two urns with cast iron stems. To the west are four stone steps and a semicircular stone bench.	II
