= Sir Richard Kaye, 6th Baronet =

English peer, churchman and scientist

The Very Reverend Sir Richard Kaye
- Dean of Lincoln
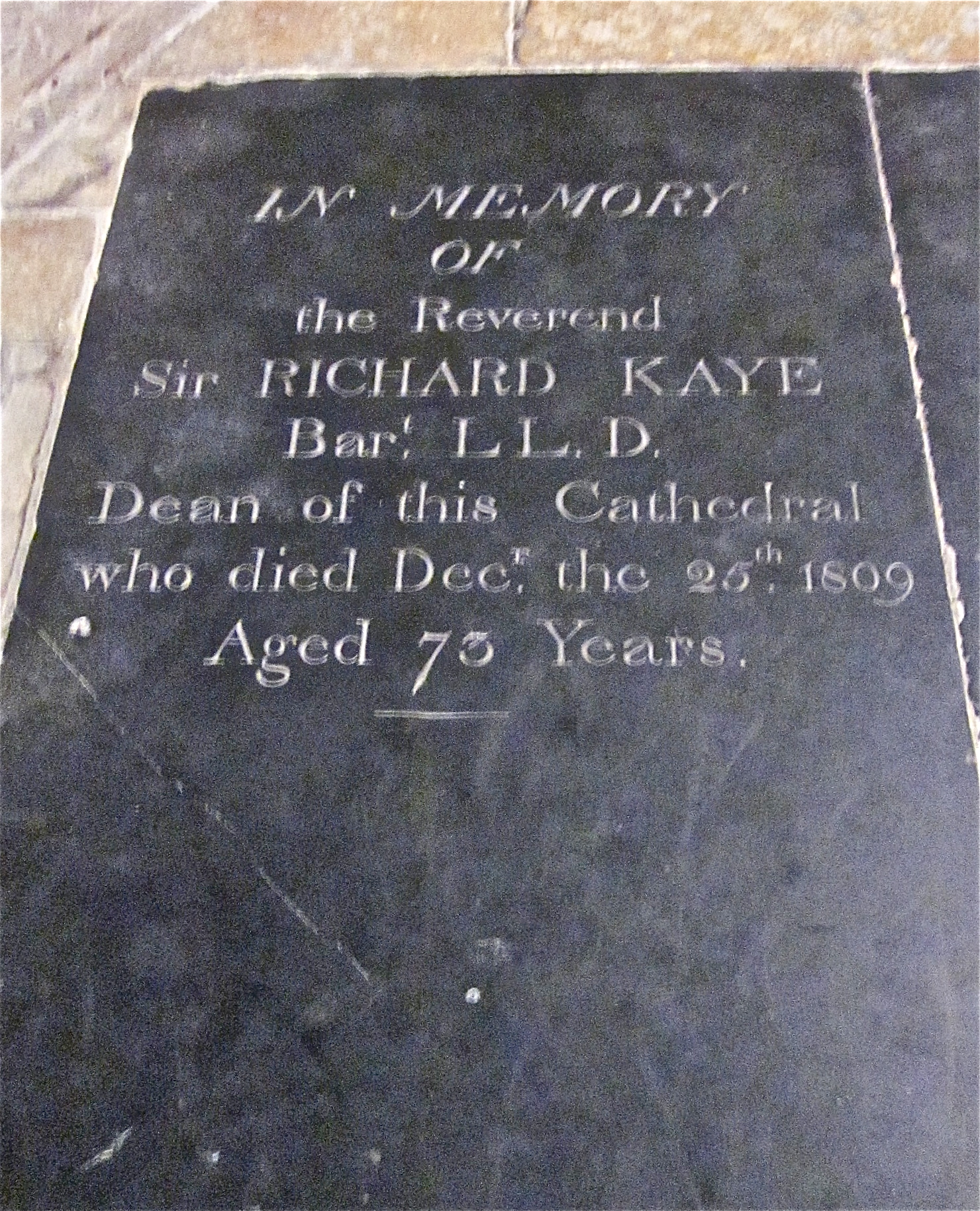
- Grave of Rev. Sir Richard Kaye, Dean of Lincoln, in the east end of Lincoln Cathedral.
- Church: Church of England
- Diocese: Diocese of Lincoln
- Elected: 1783
- Predecessor: Richard Cust
- Successor: George Gordon
- Other posts: Archdeacon of Nottingham; 1780–1809

Personal details
- Born: 1736-7
- Died: 25 December 1809
- Buried: Lincoln Cathedral
- Denomination: Anglican
- Profession: Anglican clergyman – fellow of the royal society
- Education: Brasenose College, Oxford

Sir Richard Kaye, 6th Baronet, FRS, LL.D (1736–25 December 1809) was an English peer, churchman and scientist. He was Dean of Lincoln from 1783, and inherited the baronetcy from his elder brother Sir John Lister Kaye, 5th Baronet in 1789.

== Life ==
Kaye matriculated in 1754 at Brasenose College, Oxford, graduating BCL in 1761. He was a patron of the artists Samuel Hieronymus Grimm, whom he commissioned for two decades to draw "everything curious", and Tilly Kettle. He was a friend of Joseph Banks whom he proposed for the Royal Society,(O'Brian 1997, p. 33) and also Captain James Cook: Cook named after him the island now called Kayak Island. He was a member of the Madrigal Society, and also a Trustee of the British Museum.(Drinkall 1965) He married Ellen Fenton, daughter of William Fenton of Rothwell, West Yorkshire and widow of Thomas Mainwaring. In 1789 he was to inherit a baronetcy. He left no children, and the baronetcy came to an end with him.

== Clerical career ==
Kaye was noted both for his piety but also as a great pluralist holding many rich livings in the Church of England at the same time.(Chadwick 1992, p. 83) Following graduation, in 1762 he was appointed chaplain to the Duke of Portland. Then in 1765 he became rector of Kirkby in Ashfield in 1765, a position he owed to the Dowager Duchess of Portland, and which he retained until his death.(Walkerdine & Buxton 1907) In this parish dissenters and methodists following John Wesley made up the greatest part of the population, but Kaye was able to bring most of the population to return to worshiping at the parish church. His notebook recording life in the parish is now in British Library. After about 1770 Grimm was to portray life in the parish with pictures of harvest devotions and the village schoolchildren attending a church service. Only a year after moving to Kirby he was appointed in 1766, a Chaplain in Ordinary within the Royal Household and in 1768 he became a Sub-Almoner. His next move forward was in 1780 when he was appointed Archdeacon of Nottingham. He had already been appointed Vicar of Clayworth. In 1783 he became prebend of North Muskham at Southwell Minster.

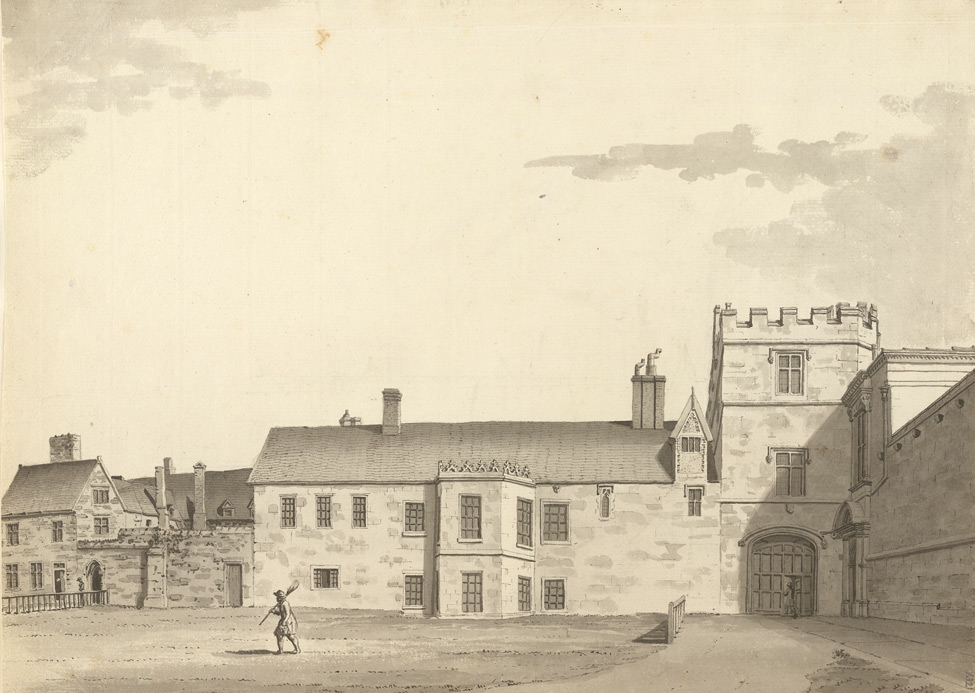
Lincoln Deanery by Hieronymus Grimm about 1784

In 1788 he became curate of Marylebone in 1788.(Lysons 1795, pp. 242–279) He had a prebend as a residential canon at Lincoln from 1783 for life,(Horn & Smith 1999) at Durham, from 1777 to 1784 (leading Grimm to sketch in the north-east),(Horn, Smith & Mussett 2004, pp. 102–103) and one at Southwell.(Brown 1896) He held all these positions together with being Dean of Lincoln from 1783 to 1809 and he resided at the Deanery in Lincoln, which was drawn by Hieronymus Grimm.

== Bibliography ==
- Brown, Cornelius (1896). A History of Nottinghamshire.
- Horn, Joyce M.; Smith, David M; Mussett, Patrick, eds. (2004). "Canons of Durham: Eighth prebend". Fasti Ecclesiae Anglicanae, 1541–1857. Vol. 11, Carlisle, Chester, Durham, Manchester, Ripon, and Sodor and Man Dioceses. London: University of London.
- Horn, Joyce M.; Smith, David M, eds. (1999). "Canons residentiary of Lincoln". Fasti Ecclesiae Anglicanae, 1541–1857. Vol. 9, Lincoln Diocese. London: University of London.
- Lysons, Daniel (1795). "Marylebone". The Environs of London. Vol. 3. London: T Cadell and W Davies – via British History Online.
- Walkerdine, H; Buxton, A S (1907). "Old churches of the Mansfield Deanery". Nottinghamshire History. Mansfield Reporter.
- Chadwick, Owen (1992). The Spirit of the Oxford Movement: Tractarian Essays. Cambridge University Press. ISBN 978-0-521-42440-0.
- Wilson, Richard George (1971). Gentlemen Merchants: The Merchant Community in Leeds, 1700–1830. Manchester University Press. ISBN 978-0-7190-0459-9.
- Crisp, Frederick Arthur, ed. (1896). Visitation of England and Wales. Vol. Notes 1. London: Privately printed. p. 53 note.
- O'Brian, Patrick (1997). Joseph Banks: A Life. University of Chicago Press. ISBN 978-0-226-61628-5.
- Drinkall, John Thomas (1965). The life and interests of the Reverend Sir Richard Kaye, Bt., LL.D., F.R.S., F.S.A., an eighteenth century pluralist (PhD). Leicester University. hdl:2381/31898.

Baronetage of England
Preceded by John Lister Kaye	Baronet (of Woodesham); 1789–1809	Extinct
