= Acworth (surname) =

Acworth is a surname. Notable people with the surname include:

- Bernard Acworth (1885–1963), British writer and creationist
- George Acworth (disambiguation)
- Harry Arbuthnot Acworth, author
- Peter Acworth (born 1970), British pornographer
- William Mitchell Acworth (1850–1925), British railway economist, barrister and politician
