= St Andrew's Church, Caunton =

Coordinates: 53°07′55″N 00°53′12″W

St. Andrew's Church, Caunton
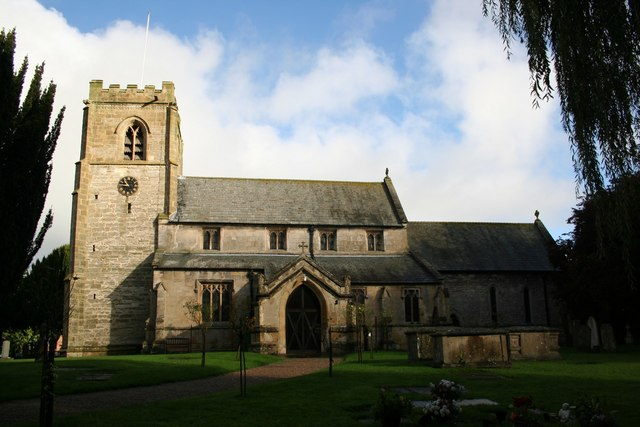
- St. Andrew's Church, Caunton
- Denomination: Church of England
- Churchmanship: Broad Church

History
- Dedication: St. Andrew

Administration
- Province: York
- Diocese: Southwell and Nottingham
- Parish: Caunton

St. Andrew's Church, Caunton is a parish church in the Church of England in Caunton, Nottinghamshire.

The church is Grade I listed by the Department for Digital, Culture, Media and Sport as a building of outstanding architectural or historic interest.

== History ==
The church was medieval but restored in 1869 by Ewan Christian.

== List of vicars ==
- William de Holm 1306
- Thomas 1318
- William Hull 1470
- John Barker
- John Hardy
- James Lee (Leghe) 1535
- William Olyver
- William Smythe 1541-1555
- James Lee 1555
- Richard Stanshall/Stanshare 1555-1557
- Roger Jackeson 1557-1561
- Robert Fraser 1561-1567
- Hugh Hole 1567-1579
- Matthew Boyle 1579-1591
- John Smvidy 1610-1617
- Richard Hewes 1617-1638
- Thomas Infield 1641-1649
- Francis Burton 1649
- Edward Overend 1661-1664
- Thomas Salter 1664–1699
- George Benlowes 1708-1731
- Thomas Leach 1731-1755
- William Harding 1755-1778
- James Burnell 1778-1817
- Joseph Lister 1817-1838
- Charles Fletcher 1838-1850
- Samuel Hole 1850-1887
- Henry Bryan McConnager Holden 1888-1891
- John Tinkler 1891-1924
- Arthur Alcock Baillie 1924-1925
- Thomas Stanley Lupton 1925-1935
- James Spencer Granville Barley 1935-1949
- Richard George Hall 1949-1954
- Eric William Trueman Dicken 1954-1965
- Wilfred Lawson Archer 1965-1973
- Robert Purdon Neill 1973-1976
- William Harvey Snow 1976-1979
- Charles Kemp Buck 1979-1982
- Vacancy 1982-1990
- Robert Andrew Whittaker 1990-1996
- Anthony I Tucker 1996-2006
- Sheila Dixon 2005-

== Pipe organ ==
The church has a small two manual pipe organ. A specification of the organ can be found on the National Pipe Organ Register

== Current parish status ==
It is in a group of parishes which includes:

- St. Andrew's Church, Caunton
- St. Giles' Church, Cromwell
- Holy Rood Church, Ossington
- St. Laurence's Church, Norwell

== See also ==
- Grade I listed buildings in Nottinghamshire
- Listed buildings in Caunton
