= Knapthorpe =

Settlement in England

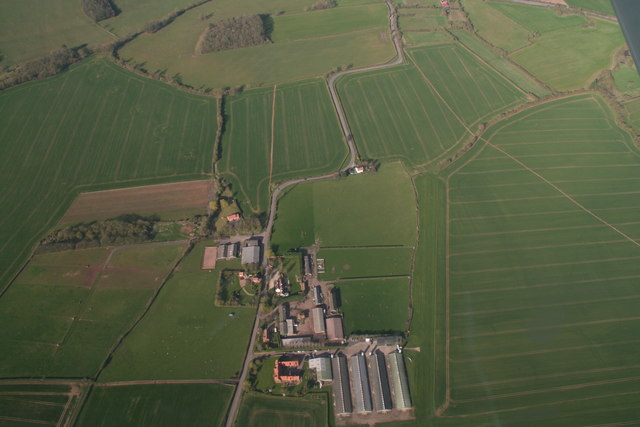
- Aerial view of Knapthorpe

- Location within Nottinghamshire
- Interactive map of Knapthorpe
- OS grid reference: SK 74010 58698
- Civil parish: Caunton
- District: Newark and Sherwood
- Shire county: Nottinghamshire
- Region: East Midlands
- Country: England
- Sovereign state: United Kingdom
- Post town: Newark
- Postcode district: NG23
- Dialling code: 01636
- Police: Nottinghamshire
- Fire: Nottinghamshire
- Ambulance: East Midlands
- UK Parliament: Newark

Knapthorpe is a hamlet in the Newark and Sherwood district of eastern Nottinghamshire, England. It is 115 miles (185 km) north of London, 16 miles (26 km) north east of the county town and city of Nottingham, and 3 3/4 miles (6 km) north east of the nearest town Southwell. It is within the civil parish of Caunton.

== Geography ==
Knapthorpe is surrounded by the following local areas:

- Caunton to the north
- Hockerton and Upton to the south
- Bathley and Little Carlton to the east
- Winkburn to the west.

This area lies to the south west of the parish, and its core is located where Caunton Road, sited between Hockerton and Caunton villages. It is predominantly a farming community, interspersed with some minor industry, and is surrounded by farms, the occasional residential dwelling and greenfield land.

There are four sites within the heart of the hamlet:

- Knapthorpe Grange, a farm
- Knapthorpe Lodge, hosting a home decor business
- Knapthorpe Manor
- Little Manor Farm

Within this central core, the land elevation is approximately 50 metres (160 ft).

There are two small tributaries which rise in the area and flow into the Beck at Caunton.

There is a private landing strip, Caunton Airfield with grass runways for microlight aircraft, east of the location.

== Governance ==
Knapthorpe along with Caunton village form Caunton parish.

The parish contained 483 residents at the 2011 census.

Both locations are managed at the first level of public administration by Caunton Parish Council.

At district level, the wider area is managed by Newark and Sherwood District Council.

Nottinghamshire County Council provides the highest level strategic services locally.

== History ==
=== Toponymy ===
Knapthorpe was Chenapetorp or Chenatorp in the Domesday Book of 1086. The first portion is Old English cnapa, meaning 'boy,' and possibly used as a personal name, with torp/thorp/thorpe being Scandinavian in origin for small place, hence "The hamlet of Knapp, or Knappi". It also could be based on the Middle English noun cnap(p), for "top, mountain top", with the surrounding land being part of a local shallow peak.

=== Developments ===
Knapthorpe was before the Norman Conquest held along with other land by Thori, son of Roal. It was reported upon in the Domesday survey of 1086, then containing four manors. The area was associated with a number of other nearby places suffixed thorpe, namely Beesthorpe and Middlethorpe, these having in common arable soils. The principal manor in the 11th century was held by Walter de Aincourt, who was a large Nottinghamshire land owner. Later owners were descendants of the Deycourt family, the Nevilles, as well as members of the Bussy, Sutton, and Thorold families, alongside the Duke of Rutland.

== Economy ==
While much of the area surrounding the residential settlement is agricultural with nearby farms working the land, there are also medium-sized retail premises offering household furnishings and pet supplies processing.
