= Listed buildings in Cromwell, Nottinghamshire =

Cromwell is a civil parish in the Newark and Sherwood district of Nottinghamshire, England. The parish contains four listed buildings that are recorded in the National Heritage List for England. Of these, one is listed at Grade I, the highest of the three grades, and the others are at Grade II, the lowest grade. The parish contains the village of Cromwell and the surrounding area. All the listed buildings are in the village, and consist of a church, a headstone in the churchyard, the former rectory and a pigeoncote.

== Key ==
Grade	Criteria
I	Buildings of exceptional interest, sometimes considered to be internationally important
II	Buildings of national importance and special interest

== Buildings ==
Name and location	Photograph	Date	Notes	Grade
St Giles' Church; 53.14503°N 0.80643°W		13th century	The church has been altered and extended through the centuries, and it was restored in 1873. It is built in stone with roofs of tile and slate, and consists of a nave with a clerestory, a south aisle, a chancel with a south chapel and a vestry, and a west tower. The tower has four stages, a chamfered plinth, four string courses, a northeast stair turret, a west doorway above which is a three-light window, both with hood moulds, two-light bell openings, an eaves band with six gargoyles, and an embattled parapet.	I
Pigeoncote, Willingham House; 53.14665°N 0.80844°W	—	Late 17th century	The pigeoncote is in brick, it has a pantile roof with notched coped gables, and a tilting board to the eaves. There are two storeys and a single bay. It contains a doorway, a casement window and pigeonholes with shelves. Inside, there are wattle and daub nesting boxes on a timber frame.	II
The Old Rectory and cottage 53.14460°N 0.80617°W		c. 1680	Originally a dower house and later a rectory, the house was extended between 1786 and 1788, and in 1814. It is built in brick on a plinth, with floor bands, deep coved eaves and slate roofs. The main block has two storeys and attics, and five bays, there is a rear wing, and a curved west wing. The doorway has a moulded architrave, and the windows are sashes, and there is a gabled dormer. The curved wing has a parapet, and on the east front is a two-storey canted bay window. To the right is a 19th-century cottage with two storeys, two bays, a pantile roof and casement windows.	II
Headstone in churchyard 53.14488°N 0.80625°W	—	1927	The headstone is in the churchyard of St Giles' Church, and is to the memory of Lucia Anne Buckley Harris. It is in stone, it has a moulded panel with a Latin inscription, and above this is a Pietà flanked by round-headed inscribed tablets.	II
