= Listed buildings in Norwell, Nottinghamshire =

Norwell is a civil parish in the Bassetlaw District of Nottinghamshire, England. The parish contains 17 listed buildings that are recorded in the National Heritage List for England. Of these, one is listed at Grade I, the highest of the three grades, and the others are at Grade II, the lowest grade. The parish contains the village of Norwell and the surrounding area, and all the listed buildings are in the village. Most of these are houses, cottages, and associated structures, farmhouses and farm buildings. The others include a church and associated structures, an animal pound, a former windmill and a war memorial.

== Key ==
Grade	Criteria
I	Buildings of exceptional interest, sometimes considered to be internationally important
II	Buildings of national importance and special interest

== Buildings ==
Name and location	Photograph	Date	Notes	Grade
St Laurence's Church; 53.14742°N 0.84180°W		13th century	The church has been altered and extended through the centuries, and it was restored in the 19th century by Ewan Christian. It is built in stone and has roofs of tile and slate. The church consists of a nave with a clerestory, north and south aisles, a south porch, north and south transepts, a chancel and a west tower. The tower has four stages, diagonal buttresses, string courses, an eaves band, four gargoyles, an embattled parapet with four crocketed pinnacles, and a pyramidal roof with a wind vane. It contains a west doorway with a hood mould, lancet windows, a clock face, and triple-lancet bell openings. There are also embattled parapets on the nave and the aisles.	I
Old Farmhouse; 53.14714°N 0.84666°W	—	1362	The farmhouse is timber-framed with brick nogging, and partly encased in brick. It has some dentilled eaves and pantile roofs. There are two storeys, five bays in three sections of differing heights, and a lean-to on the left. Most of the windows are casements, some with segmental heads, and there are two sloping dormers.	II
Ivy Cottage; 53.14654°N 0.84950°W		Fifteenth century	A house that has a timber-framed core with brick nogging, it was encased in brick in the 18th century, and is on a plinth, with a floor band and a pantile roof with a single coped gable and kneelers. There are two storeys and two bays, and a weatherboarded lean-to on the left. Most of the windows are horizontally-sliding sashes, and there are also casements.	II
The Old House and Elderberry Cottage; 53.14810°N 0.84549°W		1494	The cottage dates from the 18th century. The buildings are in timber-framing with brick nogging and brick, on plinths of stone and brick, with plain and dentilled eaves, and pantile roofs with coped gables and kneelers. There are two storeys and attics, an L-shaped plan, and a single-storey single-bay lean-to on the west front. Most of the windows are casements, and there is a gabled dormer.	II
1 Greasley's Cottages and Pitchforks Cottage; 53.14747°N 0.84365°W		Mid 16th century	A house, originally four timber-framed cottages with brick nogging, later encased in brick, with cogged eaves, and pantile roofs with a single coped gable and kneelers. There are two storeys and fronts of two and five bays. The windows are sashes, some horizontally-sliding, and most openings have segmental heads.	II
Palis Hall; 53.14488°N 0.85232°W	—	16th century	A pair of houses, partly timber-framed with brick nogging and partly in stone, on a stone plinth, with a pargeted floor band, some diapering, dentilled eaves and pantile roofs. There are two storeys, fronts of four and five bays, and later brick extensions. The windows are a mix of casements, and horizontally-sliding sashes, some with segmental heads, and there is a French window.	II
The Old Post Office; 53.14589°N 0.85040°W		Mid 16th century	A timber-framed house with brick cladding and roughcast, on a brick plinth, with a pantile roof. There are two storeys, two bays, a continuous rear outshut, and an extension to the north. Most of the windows are horizontally-sliding sashes, some with segmental heads, and there is a sloping dormer.	II
School House; 53.14663°N 0.84650°W		Early 18th century	The house is in brick on a plinth, with cogged and rebated eaves, and a tile roof with coped gables and kneelers. There are two storeys and an L-shaped plan, with a front range of two bays, and a later rear wing. The doorway has a rusticated surround, a dentilled round head and kneelers, and above it is a round opening. The ground floor windows are sashes with segmental heads, and above are cross-eaves dormers with horizontally-sliding sashes.	II
Church Farm House and Cottage; 53.14786°N 0.84443°W		18th century	The farmhouse and adjoining cottage are in brick, on plinths, with a floor band, and a pantile roof with a coped gable and kneelers. There are two storeys and attics. The cottage., on the left, has two bays, the farmhouse has three bays, and there is a two-storey single-bay extension to the right, and a further single-storey single-bay extension. The windows are sashes, some horizontally-sliding, and some with segmental heads.	II
Stable, The Old Hall; 53.14667°N 0.84300°W	—	Mid 18th century	The stable is in brick on a chamfered stone plinth, with a floor band, cogged eaves and a hipped pantile roof. There are two storeys and two bays. The openings include a stable door, a casement window and blocked pigeonholes.	II
Village Pound; 53.14573°N 0.85093°W		18th century	The pound is circular, with a diameter of about 10 metres (33 ft). It is in brick with half-round stone coping, and contains a pair of square gate piers with stone caps and a wooden gate.	II
The Old Hall; 53.14695°N 0.84288°W	—	c. 1760	A brick farmhouse, partly rendered, on a rendered plinth, with a floor band, dentilled eaves, and a pantile roof with coped gables and kneelers. There are two storeys and attics and an L-shaped plan, with a front range of three bays, and a rear wing. On the front is a gabled porch and a doorway with a fanlight. Most of the windows are sashes, some horizontally-sliding, and some with segmental heads, and there are also casement windows.	II
Barn, School House Farm; 53.14611°N 0.85107°W		Late 18th century	The barn, later converted for residential use, is in brick on a plinth, with dentilled eaves, and a pantile roof with tumbled coped gables. There is a single storey and five unequal bays, and a lean-to on the right. It contains stable doors with segmental heads, vents, a sash window, a pitching hole with a hatch, and a weatherboarded dormer with pigeonholes.	II
Willoughby Farm House and railing 53.14783°N 0.84652°W		Early 19th century	A brick farmhouse with cogged eaves, and a pantile roof with coped gables and kneelers. Three are two storeys and attics and an L-shaped plan, with a front range of three bays, and a rear wing with two storeys and a tile roof. The central doorway has a fanlight, the windows are sashes, and there are two gabled dormers with decorative bargeboards and casement windows. Adjoining the house is a brick boundary wall with stone coping, containing two cast iron piers, wrought iron railings, and a matching gate.	II
Boundary wall, St Laurence's Church; 53.14746°N 0.84252°W		19th century	The wall enclosing the churchyard is in brick, on plinths of stone and brick, with ramped stone coping, and it extends for about 250 metres (820 ft). The wall contains a pair of square gate piers with shallow pyramidal caps, and timber gates.	II
The Old Windmill; 53.14723°N 0.84452°W		1852	The former windmill is in tarred brick with a concrete slab roof, and consists of a circular tapering tower with three stages. It contains a stable door with a segmental head, over which is a datestone, casement windows, and a link to a bungalow.	II
War memorial 53.14745°N 0.84229°W		1921	The war memorial is in the churchyard of St Laurence's Church, and it is in rough hewn granite. It consists of a Celtic cross on a tapered plinth and a single step. On the front and the rear of the shaft and the plinth are inscriptions and the names of those lost in the two World Wars and in a subsequent conflict.	II
