= George Acworth =

George Acworth may refer to:

- George Acworth (politician) (1482–1530), English politician
- George Acworth (Anglican divine) (1534–c. 1578), English Protestant divine
