= St Giles' Church, Cromwell =

Coordinates: 53°08′42″N 00°48′23″W

St. Giles' Church, Cromwell
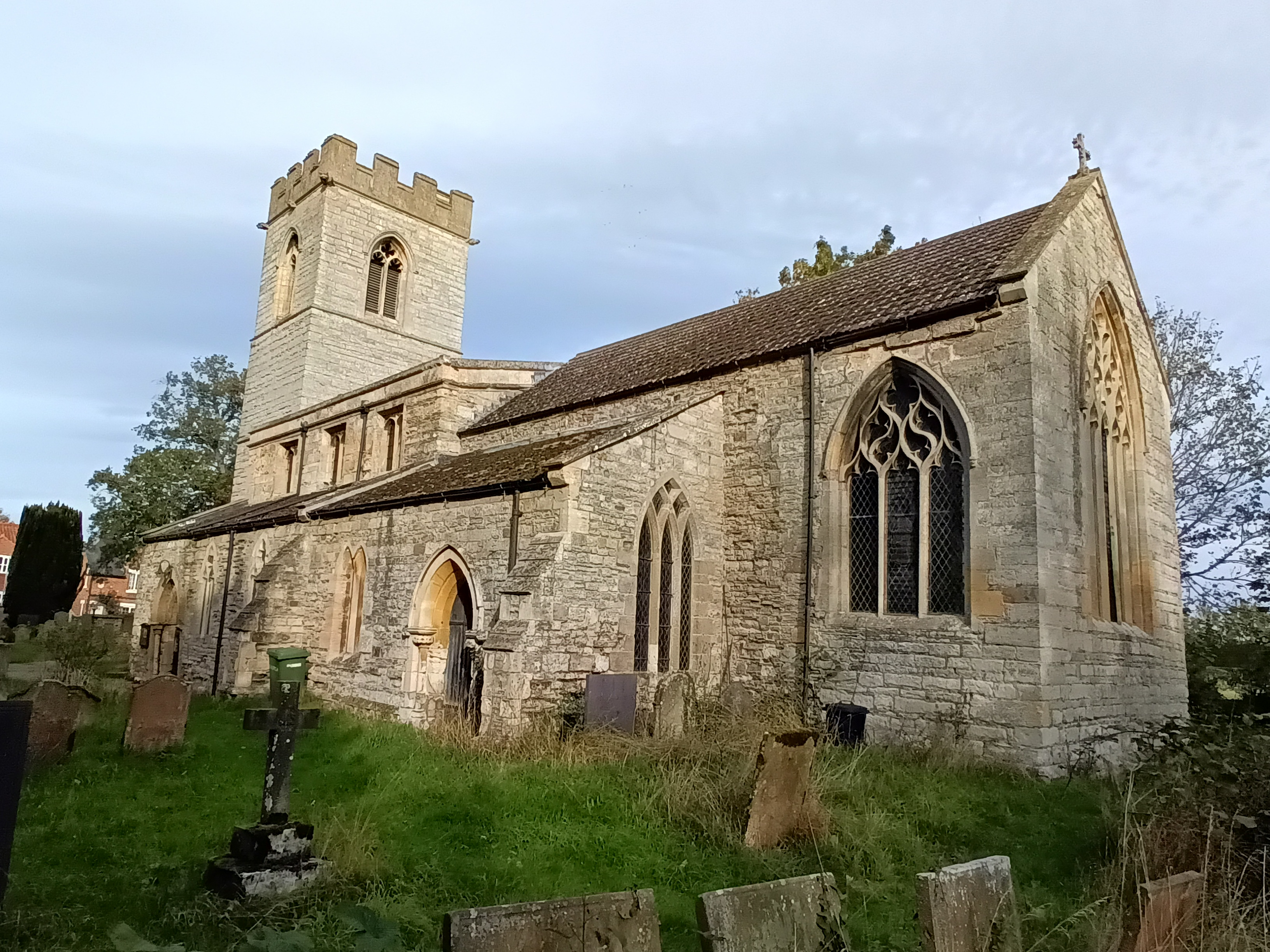
- St. Giles' Church in 2025
- St. Giles' Church, Cromwell
- Denomination: Church of England
- Churchmanship: Broad Church

History
- Dedication: St. Giles

Administration
- Province: York
- Diocese: Southwell and Nottingham
- Parish: Cromwell, Nottinghamshire

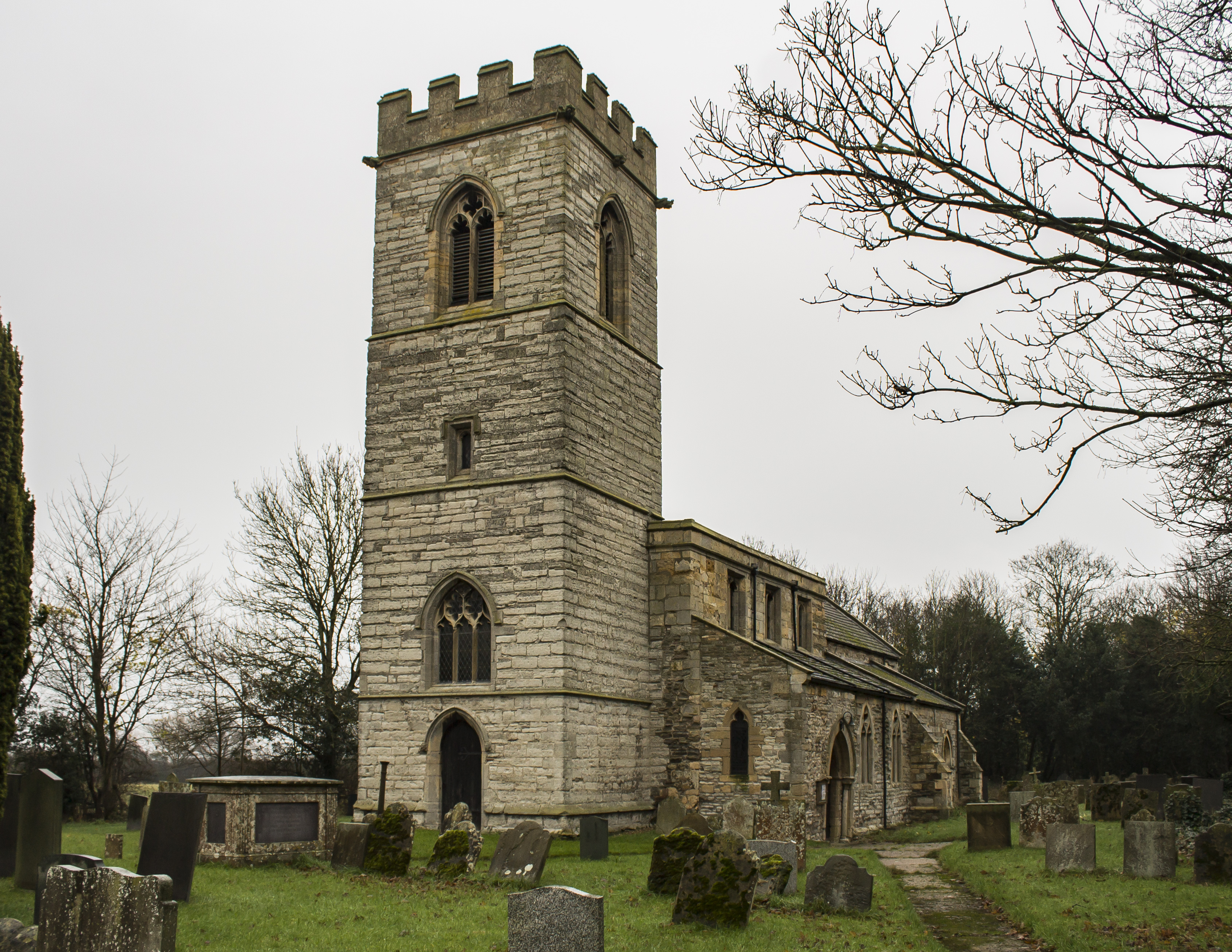
West End.

St. Giles' Church, Cromwell is a parish church in the Church of England in Cromwell, Nottinghamshire.

The church is Grade I listed by the Department for Digital, Culture, Media and Sport as a building of outstanding architectural or historic interest.

== History ==
The church was medieval but restored in 1873 to 1876 by Ewan Christian. The church is largely 13th century with the tower being built around 1427.

== Pipe organ ==
The church has a small single manual pipe organ. A specification of the organ can be found on the National Pipe Organ Register

== Current parish status ==
It is in a group of parishes which includes:

- St. Andrew's Church, Caunton
- St. Giles' Church, Cromwell
- Holy Rood Church, Ossington
- St. Laurence's Church, Norwell

== See also ==
- Grade I listed buildings in Nottinghamshire
- Listed buildings in Cromwell, Nottinghamshire
