= John Favour =

John Favour (died 1624) was an English divine.

== Life ==
Favour was born in Southampton, and was sent to Winchester College, whence he was elected probationer fellow of New College, Oxford, in 1576, and in 1578 was made complete fellow. In April 1584 he took the degree of LL.B., proceeding LL.D. on 5 June 1592 (Wood, Fasti Oxon. ed. Bliss, i. 258). In January 1593–4 he became vicar of Halifax, Yorkshire. In August 1608 according to Thoresby, but in March 1618 according to Wood, he was made warden of St. Mary Magdalen's Hospital at Ripon, Yorkshire. He was made prebendary of Southwell in 1611 and of Osbaldwick, York, in 1614. In March 1616–17 he was collated to the prebend of Driffield and to the chantorship of the church of York. He was also chaplain to the archbishop and residentiary.

Favour died on 10 March 1623–4, and was buried in the chancel of Halifax Church, where on a pillar on the south side of the choir is an inscription to his memory (Watson, Hist. of Halifax, pp. 377–8). He married at Leeds, on 12 November 1695, Ann Power, probably the daughter of William Power, rector of Barwick-in-Elmet, near that town.

== Works ==
Favour published "Antiqvitie trivmphing over Noveltie: Whereby it is proved that Antiqvitie is a true and certaine Note of the Christian Catholicke Church and verity, against all new and late vpstart heresies aduancing themselues against the religious honour of old Rome", &c., pp. 602, London, 1619. From the dedication to Tobie Mathew, archbishop of York, it appears that the work was begun by the author when he was "threescore yeares old" at the desire, and carried on under the encouragement, of the archbishop. As an instance of the ignorance of the people when the Bible was withheld from them by the "Romanists", he relates at page 334 a story of a woman who, when she "heard the passion of Christ read in her owne tongue", wept bitterly. "After some pause and recollection of her spirits, she asked where this was done, & when: it was answered, many thousand miles hence at Ierusalem, and a great while ago, about fifteene hundred yeares. Then (quoth she) if it was so farre off, and so long ago, by the grace of God it might proue a lye, and therein she comforted her selfe."
