= Holy Rood Church, Ossington =

Coordinates: 53°10′40″N 00°51′57″W

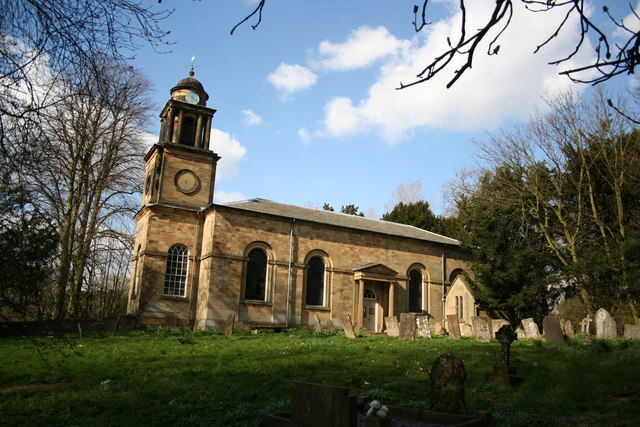
- Holy Rood Church, Ossington
- Denomination: Church of England
- Churchmanship: Broad Church

History
- Dedication: Holy Rood

Administration
- Province: York
- Diocese: Southwell and Nottingham
- Deanery: Newark & Southwell
- Parish: Ossington

Clergy
- Vicar: Rev French

Holy Rood Church, Ossington is a parish church in the Church of England in Ossington, Nottinghamshire.

The church is Grade I listed by the Department for Digital, Culture, Media and Sport as a building of outstanding architectural or historic interest.

== History ==
The church was built from 1782 to 1783 by John Carr of York. It is thought to stand on, or very near to, the original site of Ossington Preceptory: a monastery of the Knights Hospitallers which was dissolved in 1534 as part of King Henry VIII's dissolution of the monasteries.

== Pipe organ ==
The church has a barrel organ by Robson dating from around 1830. It has been awarded a Historic Organ Certificate by the British Institute of Organ Studies which has awarded it a Grade I listing. Details of the organ can be found on the National Pipe Organ Register.

== Current parish status ==
It is in a group of parishes which includes:

- St. Andrew's Church, Caunton
- St. Giles' Church, Cromwell
- Holy Rood Church, Ossington
- St. Laurence's Church, Norwell

== See also ==
- Grade I listed buildings in Nottinghamshire
- Listed buildings in Ossington
