= St Laurence's Church, Norwell =

Coordinates: 53°08′50″N 00°50′28″W

St. Laurence Church, Norwell
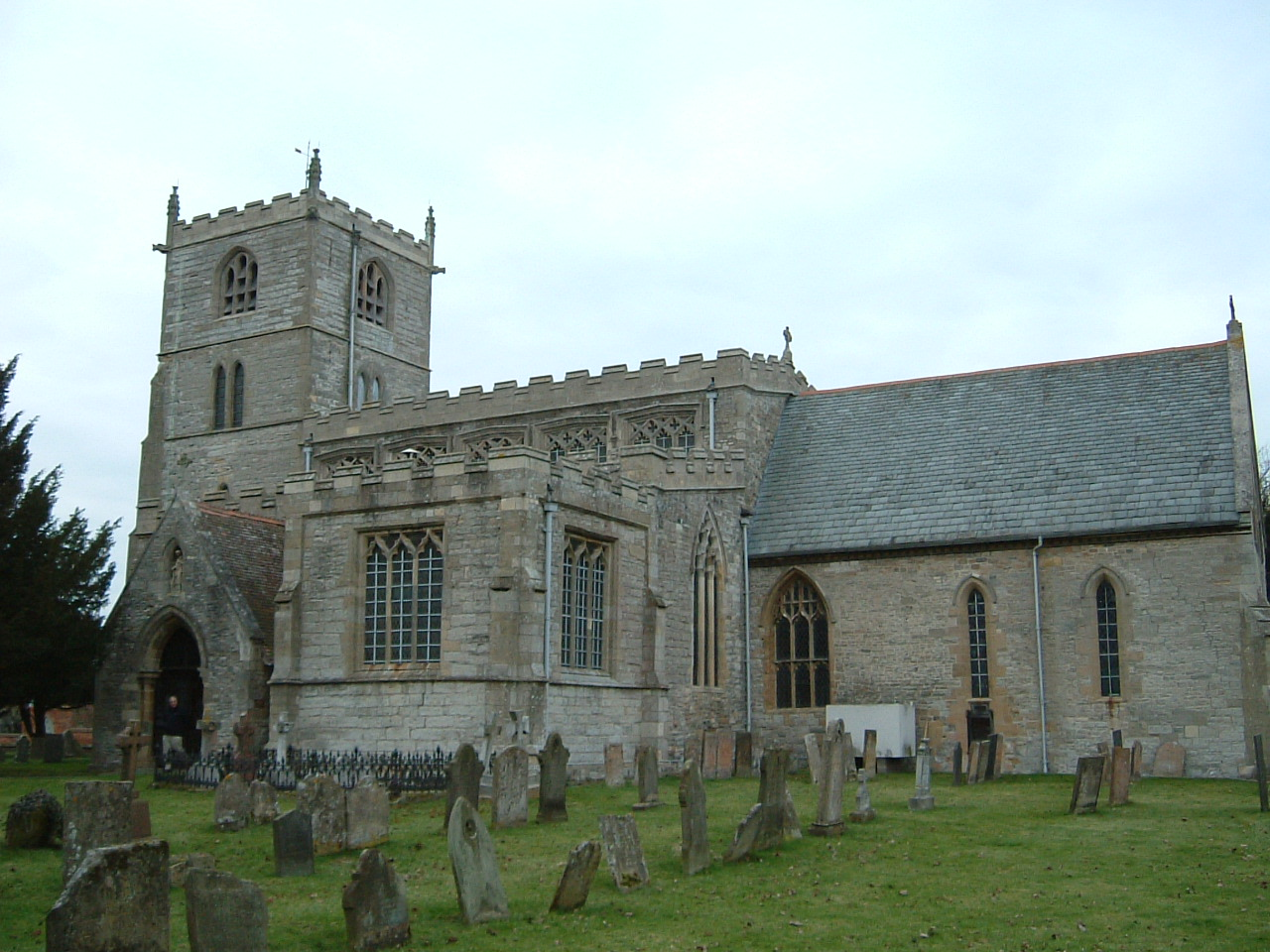
- St. Laurence Church, Norwell
- St. Laurence Church, Norwell
- Denomination: Church of England
- Churchmanship: Broad Church

History
- Dedication: St. Laurence

Administration
- Province: York
- Diocese: Southwell and Nottingham
- Parish: Norwell, Nottinghamshire

Clergy
- Vicar: Revd Canon Mark Adams

St. Laurence Church, Norwell is a parish church in the Church of England in Norwell, Nottinghamshire.

The church is Grade I listed by the Department for Digital, Culture, Media and Sport as a building of outstanding architectural or historic interest.

== History ==
The church is medieval but was heavily restored between 1874 and 1875 by Ewan Christian.

== Stained glass ==
There are stained glass windows by Charles Eamer Kempe.

== Pipe organ ==
The church has a pipe organ by James Binns of Leeds. A specification of the organ can be found on the National Pipe Organ Register.

== Current parish status ==
It is in a group of parishes which includes:

- St. Andrew's Church, Caunton
- St. Giles' Church, Cromwell
- Holy Rood Church, Ossington
- St. Laurence Church, Norwell

== See also ==
- Grade I listed buildings in Nottinghamshire
- Listed buildings in Norwell, Nottinghamshire
