= Cromwell, Nottinghamshire =

Village in Nottinghamshire, England

Coordinates: 53.14°N 0.81°W

Cromwell
- Village and civil parish
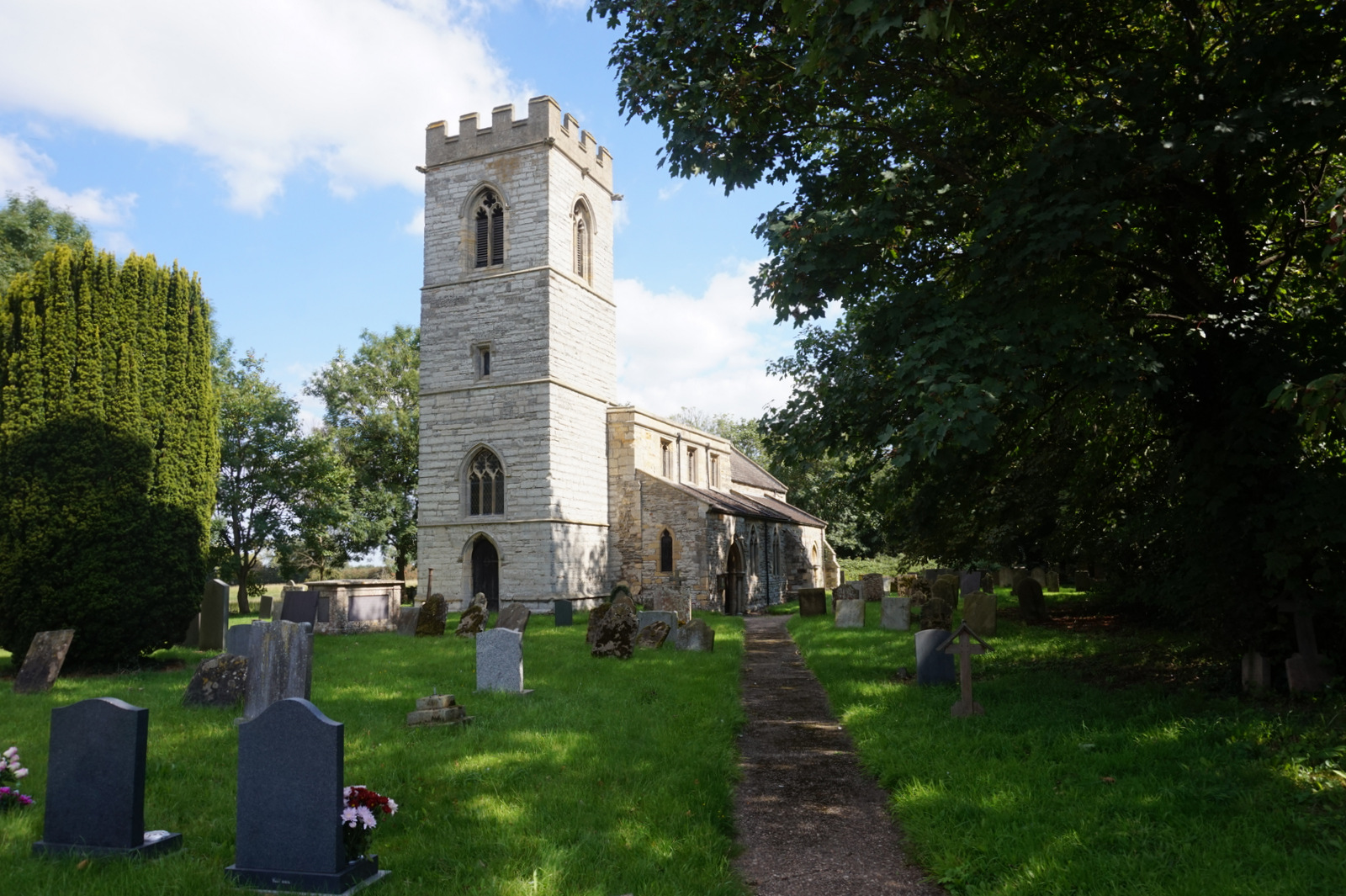
- St. Giles' Church

- Location within Nottinghamshire
- Interactive map of Cromwell
- Area: 2.21 sq mi (5.7 km^{2})
- Population: 271 (2021)
  - Density: 123/sq mi (47/km^{2})
- OS grid reference: SK 798614
  - London: 115 mi (185 km) SSE
- District: Newark and Sherwood
- Shire county: Nottinghamshire
- Region: East Midlands
- Country: England
- Sovereign state: United Kingdom
- Post town: NEWARK
- Postcode district: NG23
- Dialling code: 01636
- Police: Nottinghamshire
- Fire: Nottinghamshire
- Ambulance: East Midlands
- UK Parliament: Newark

Cromwell is a village and civil parish in Nottinghamshire, England. It is located 5 miles (8 km) north of Newark. According to the 2001 census it had a population of 188, increasing to 232 at the 2011 census, and 271 at the 2021 census.

St. Giles' Church, Cromwell is 13th century, with a tower built c. 1427.

The Old Rectory was built c. 1680 as a dower house for the Earl of Clare, and in use as a rectory before 1714. Between the village and the River Trent lies an extensive area of Roman fields with associated villa. Parts of a timber and stone bridge have also been recorded close by.

Cromwell is one of the four Thankful Villages in Nottinghamshire – those rare places that suffered no fatalities during the Great War of 1914 to 1918. The village was featured on Darren Hayman's album, Thankful Villages Volume 2.

Just to the east of the village is Cromwell Lock, the point where the non-tidal River Trent ends and the so-called Tideway starts. From Cromwell Lock, commercial traffic and pleasure craft may navigate north towards Torksey, Gainsborough and ultimately the Trent Falls, where the River Trent meets the Yorkshire Ouse and becomes the Humber. Navigators on the Trent must wait till the tide is ebbing or flooding in their favour to ensure a safe and efficient passage.

== Geography ==
The village lies along the Great North Road (formerly the A1). In 1965 a bypass was built by Robert McGregor & Sons, as part of the Improvement from North Muskham to south of Carlton on Trent including Cromwell Bypass. The bypass cost £800,000 and started in late June 1964, and opened on the morning of Tuesday 11 January 1966.

Cromwell Bypass was the location of highly collaborative trials of the slip-form paver in 1964/65. The first such machine to be brought into the UK was used to trial the laying of unreinforced and reinforced concrete carriageways with dowelled contraction and expansion joints. The surface has now been rebuilt using tarmac (asphalt concrete).

== See also ==
- Listed buildings in Cromwell, Nottinghamshire
