= Ossington =

Village in Nottinghamshire, England

Coordinates: 53°10′27″N 00°52′07″W

- Village and civil parish
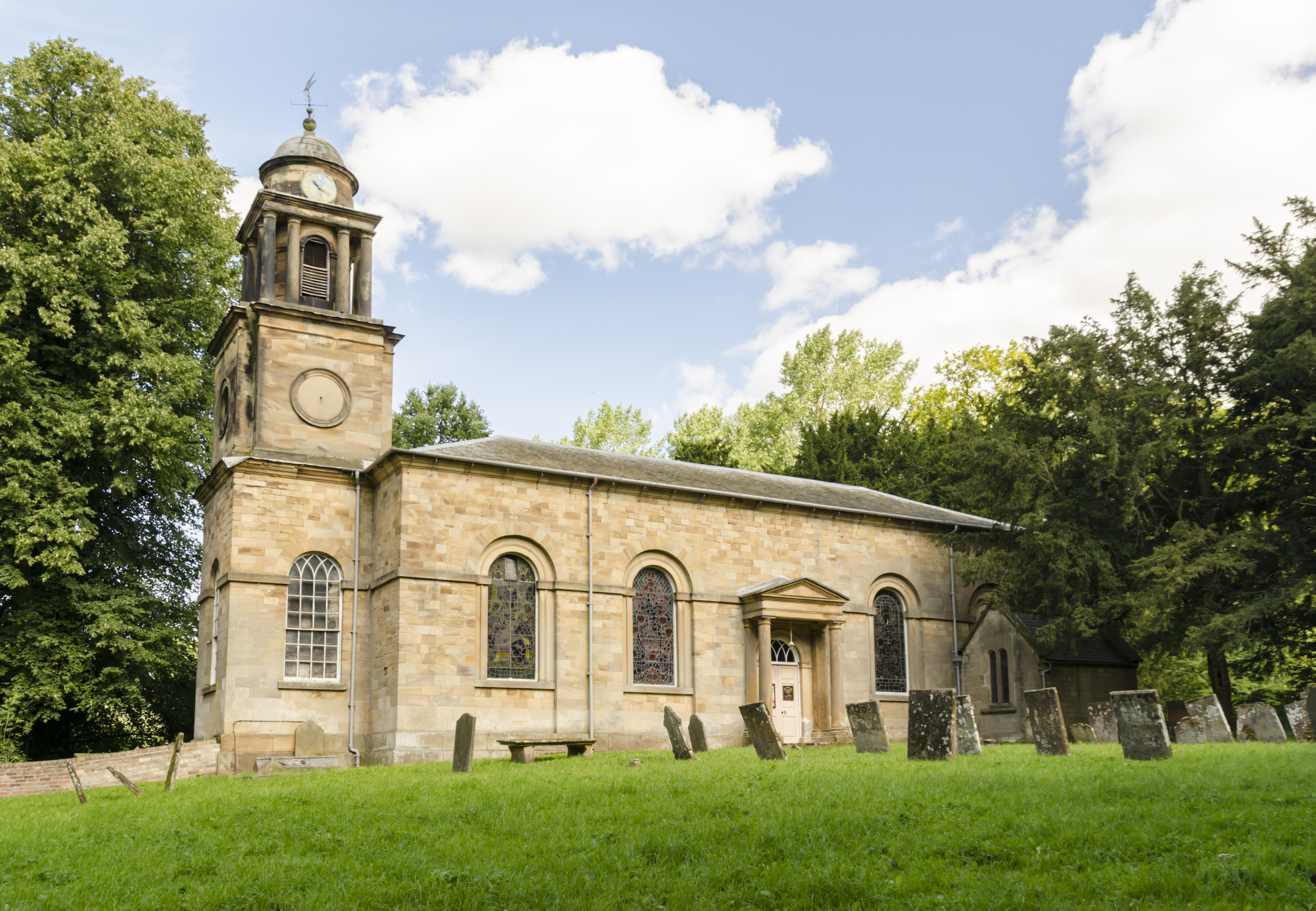
- Church of the Holy Rood

- Location within Nottinghamshire
- Interactive map of Ossington
- Area: 3.76 sq mi (9.7 km^{2})
- Population: 109 (2021)
  - Density: 29/sq mi (11/km^{2})
- OS grid reference: SK 757647
  - London: 120 mi (190 km) SSE
- District: Newark and Sherwood
- Shire county: Nottinghamshire
- Region: East Midlands
- Country: England
- Sovereign state: United Kingdom
- Post town: NEWARK
- Postcode district: NG23
- Dialling code: 01636
- Police: Nottinghamshire
- Fire: Nottinghamshire
- Ambulance: East Midlands
- UK Parliament: Newark

Ossington is a village and civil parish in the county of Nottinghamshire, England 7 miles north of Newark-on-Trent. The population count was 109 residents at the 2021 census.

== History ==
The village centred on Ossington Hall, the ancestral home of the Denison family, but the house was demolished in 1964 and all that remains are a few outbuildings and a private chapel that now serves the parish as Holy Rood Church, Ossington. This is a Grade I listed building, originally 12th century and rebuilt in 1782–1783 by the architect John Carr, with minor 19th-century alterations and additions. It includes earlier monuments and stained glass. There is a barrel organ built by Thomas Robson in 1840.

=== Ossington Hall ===
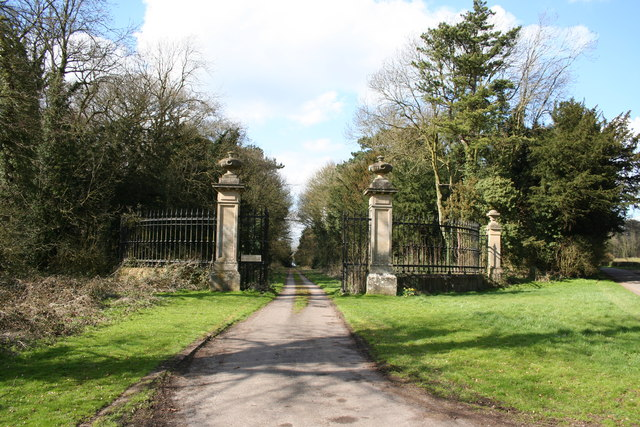
Ossington Hall was built in 1729, enlarged about 1790 and demolished in 1964. The gates remain as a grand entrance to a drive that now leads only to the parkland and Holy Rood church.

The estate can be traced back to Saxon times, when it was known as "Oschinton" and then later in 1144 as "Oscinton". The lord at that time, Roger de Burun, gave the estate to the Cluniac order of monks, when he entered the order as an act of penitence. He neglected to recall that he had earlier made the property over to the Hospitallers of St. John of Jerusalem. A legal dispute followed between the two religious orders, which the Hospitallers won. They retained ownership until the Dissolution of the monasteries around 1539. The estate was eventually bought by the Cartwright family, of whom there are monuments in the church. The house was damaged during the Civil War and in 1753 passed to William Denison, a merchant of Leeds. He and his brother Robert made substantial improvements. William was appointed High Sheriff of Nottinghamshire for 1779.

The house was then inherited by Denison's nephew, John Wilkinson, who changed his name to Denison and made further improvements to it. John Denison's heir was his eldest son, John Evelyn Denison (1800–1873), Speaker of the House of Commons, who held the estates from 1820 until his death in 1873, and was created Viscount Ossington in 1872. After his death with no direct heir, the estate passed to William Evelyn Denison (1843–1916), William Thomas Denison, son of Ossington's brother, and after him to a cousin, William Frank Evelyn Denison, who died two years later. The estates then reverted to Elinor Denison, widow of William Evelyn Denison, until her death in 1939, when it devolved on William Frank Evelyn Denison's cousin, William Maxwell Evelyn Denison (1904–1972).

=== Air base ===
During the Second World War a large Royal Air Force station known as RAF Ossington was laid out on land close to the Ossington estate. It opened on 18 January 1942 as the base for No. 14 (Pilots) Advanced Flying Unit and was transferred to No. 93 (Training) Group RAF Bomber Command in 1943. In January 1945 it was finally transferred to RAF Transport Command No. 6 Lancaster Finishing School, before it was closed in August 1946. The hall formed part of the accommodation for the airfield.

=== Demolition ===
After the Second World War, the hall fell into disrepair and was demolished in 1964. An urn from the estate survives in the grounds of Flintham Hall. Some other outbuildings and a small well remain.

== See also ==
- John Denison of Ossington (c. 1758 - 1820}, father of Viscount Ossington
- John Evelyn Denison, 1st Viscount Ossington
- William Evelyn Denison
- George Anthony Denison
- Listed buildings in Ossington
- Ossington Street
- Ossington Avenue
