= Robert Wolveden =

Robert Wolveden (died in 1432) was a Canon of Windsor from 1407 to 1412 and Dean of Lichfield.

== Career ==
He was appointed as:

- Prebendary of York 1401
- Prebendary of Southwell 1405
- Archdeacon of Norwich 1406
- Dean of Lichfield 1426 - 1432

He was appointed to the first stall in St George's Chapel, Windsor Castle in 1407, and held the stall until 1412 when he exchanged it for the Deanery of Tetenhale.
