= George Acworth (Anglican divine) =

English Anglican divine and civil lawyer

George Acworth (1534–1578?) was an English protestant divine and civil lawyer.

Acworth was educated at Peterhouse, Cambridge. During the reign of Queen Mary, he travelled in France and Italy, where he studied civil law. In 1560, he was public orator at Cambridge; and, in the following year, was created doctor of laws.

In 1562, he was admitted as an advocate in the Arches Court; and afterwards lived in the family of archbishop Parker, who gave him a prebend of North Muskham in Southwell, Nottinghamshire. In 1567, he was vicar-general to Robert Horne, bishop of Winchester; and, in 1575, the archbishop of Canterbury permitted him to hold the rectory of Ellington, alias Wroughton, near Swindon in the Diocese of Sarum, and was permitted to hold another benefice at the same time.

In 1576, he was appointed master of the faculties, and judge of the prerogative court, in Ireland, after he had been turned out of all the situations he held in England because of his dissolute conduct. The date of his death is uncertain.

Acworth wrote: Orationem encomiasticam in restitutione Buceri et Fagii, printed in Hist. Buceri, Argentor, 1562 (re Martin Bucer & Paul Fagius); the preface to Book II of Bucer's works, fol. Basil, 1577; De visibili Romanarchia, contra Nic. Sanderi Monarchiam, London, 1622. This was written while he lived with archbishop Parker, and probably at his instigation; Nicolas Sanderus had written Monarchia. At one time, he enjoyed the confidence of archbishop Parker, and assisted him in his Antiquitates Britannicae.
