= Caunton =

Village and civil parish in Nottinghamshire, England

Coordinates: 53°08′N 0°53′W

- Village and civil parish
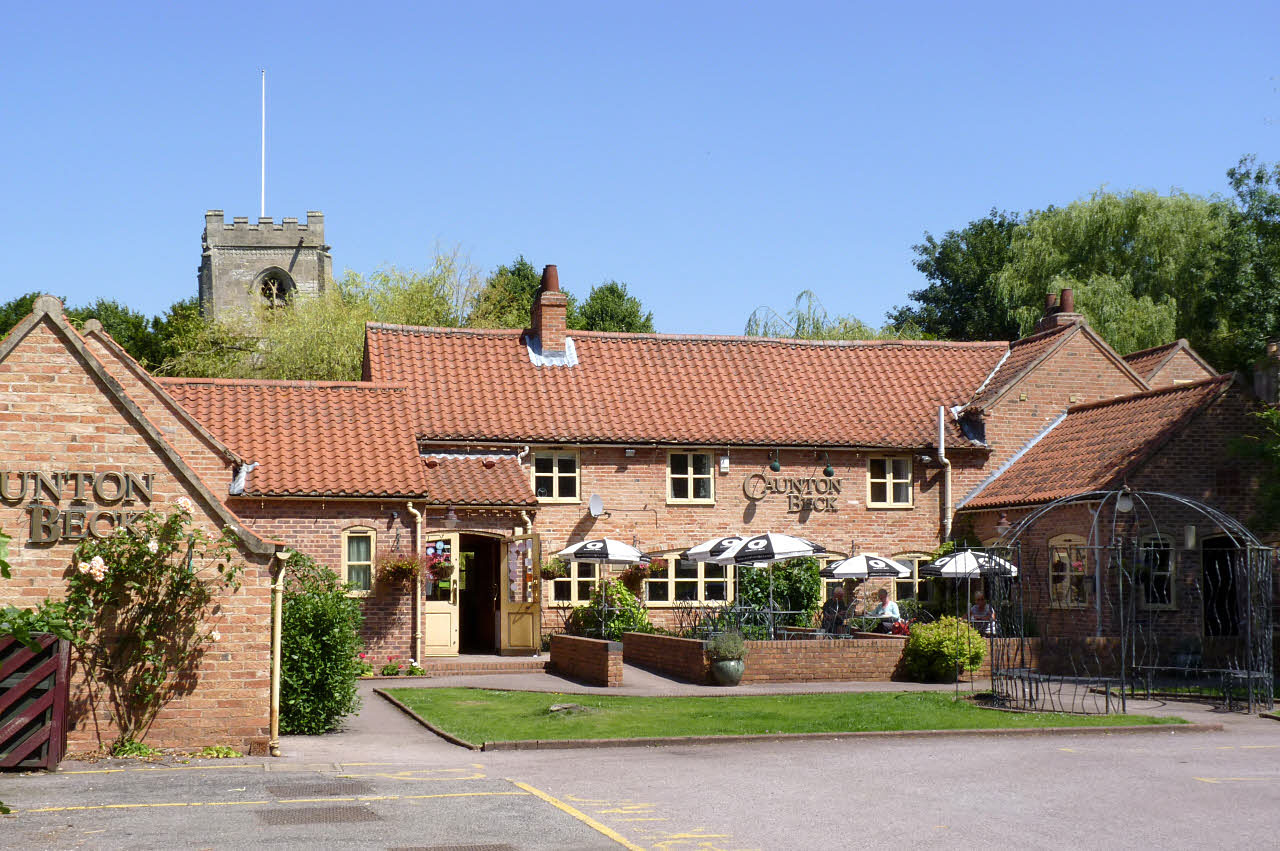
- Caunton Beck and church

- Location within Nottinghamshire
- Interactive map of Caunton
- Area: 4.84 sq mi (12.5 km^{2})
- Population: 508 (2021)
  - Density: 105/sq mi (41/km^{2})
  - London: 115 mi (185 km) SSE
- District: Newark and Sherwood
- Shire county: Nottinghamshire
- Region: East Midlands
- Country: England
- Sovereign state: United Kingdom
- Settlements: Caunton; Knapthorpe
- Post town: NEWARK
- Postcode district: NG23
- Dialling code: 01636
- Police: Nottinghamshire
- Fire: Nottinghamshire
- Ambulance: East Midlands
- UK Parliament: Newark
- Website: https://www.cauntonparishcouncil.gov.uk/community/caunton-parish-council-20985/home/

Caunton is a village and civil parish in the Newark and Sherwood district of Nottinghamshire on the A616, six miles (9.7 km) north-west of Newark-on-Trent, in the NG23 postcode. The population of the civil parish at the 2011 census was 483, and this increased to 508 at the 2021 census.

== Etymology ==
The name of Caunton first appears in the Domesday Book of 1086, as Calnestone and Calnestune, around 1160 as Kalnadatun, and in 1166–67 as Calnodeston and Calnoðeston. The name is thought to derive from an Old English personal name Cal(u)nōþ in its genitive form Cal(u)nōþes, compounded with the noun tūn ("estate"). If so, the name once meant "Calnōth's estate".

== History ==
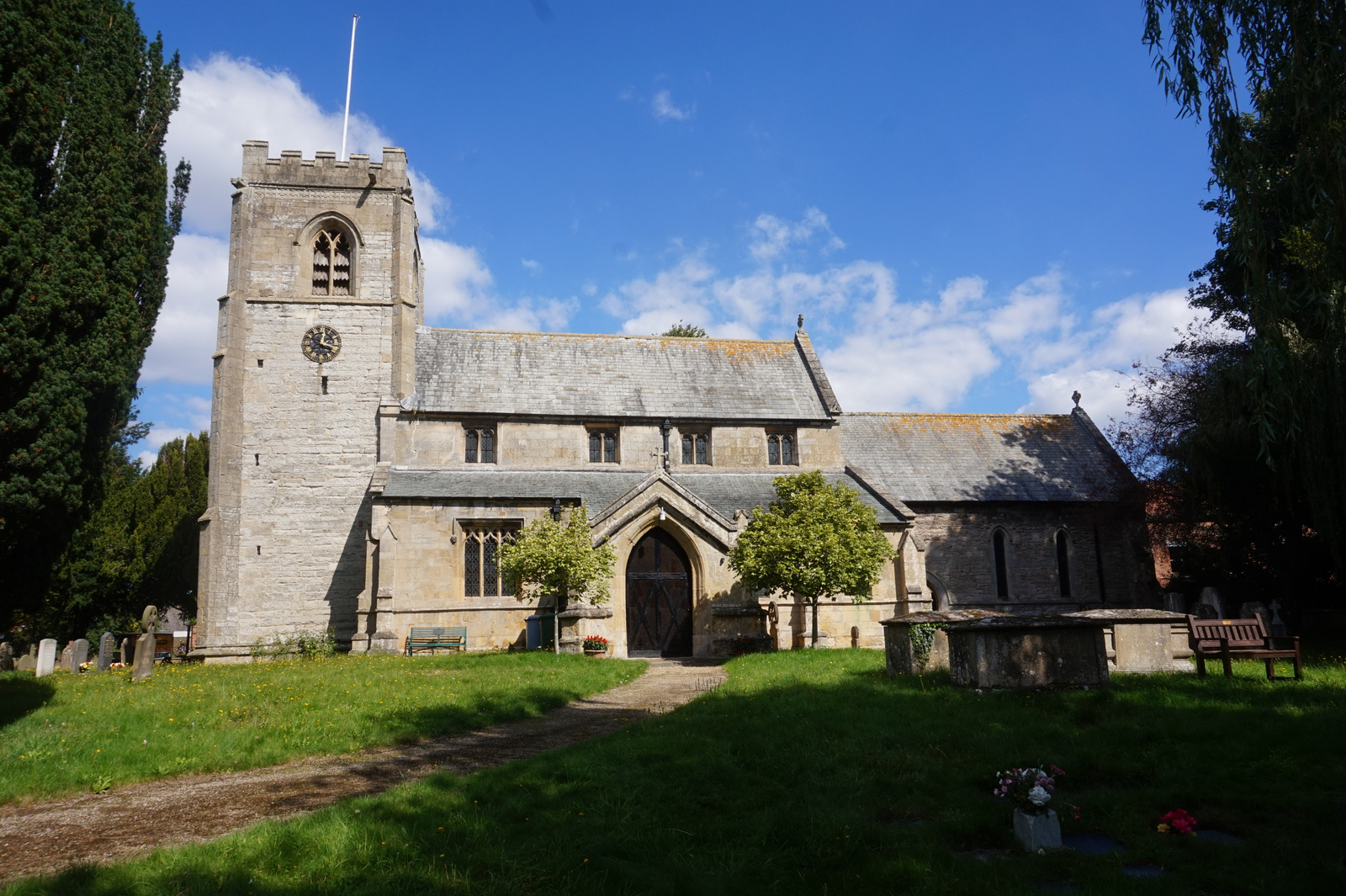
St Andrew's Church, Caunton

The village is notable for its association with Samuel Hole, who is buried in the churchyard of St. Andrew's Church. He was the village's vicar for a short while before becoming Dean of Rochester and lived in the manor. The manor house now has its own equestrian centre and a mini golf course.

Caunton Mill, also known as Sharp's Mill, was a 43 ft brick tower windmill, with an ogee cap, built before 1825. It was out of use in the 1930s. The mill survives without its cap, machinery and gallery.

=== Second World War ===
As part of the East Midlands Oil Province, oil imports from the Abadan Refinery in Iran were hampered, until Sicily was invaded in July 1943. So the only alternative was oil from England. The Anglo-Iranian Oil Company (BP) drilled at Eakring, and at Caunton. Oil was discovered in March 1943, and produced from May 1943. Another oil field later in 1943 was at Nocton, in North Kesteven. BP required 100,000 tons of crude oil from the Nottinghamshire fields, per year.

In 1950 the Anglo-Iranian Oil Company would set up its Kirklington Hall Research Station, nearby to the west, to investigate geophysical exploration.

=== Filming ===
Caunton was used as a filming location for the majority of the second-series episodes of the popular British comedy drama Auf Wiedersehen, Pet, about a group of seven British migrant construction workers, with Beesthorpe Hall being used as Thornely Manor which was being renovated as part of the storyline.

== Geography ==
The hamlet of Knapthorpe is to the south of the village and A616 road, and within the parish boundary.

The village pubs are The Plough and the country pub, Caunton Beck, both on Main Street.

HMS Caunton, named after the village, was a Ton-class minesweeper in service from 18 December 1952 to 1970.

== Notable people ==
- Spencer Matthews used to live in the village when younger.

== See also ==
- Listed buildings in Caunton
