= Manners-Sutton =

Manners-Sutton may refer to:

== People ==
- Charles Manners-Sutton (1755–1828), Church of England bishop
- Charles Manners-Sutton, 1st Viscount Canterbury (1780–1845), British Tory politician
- Lord George Manners-Sutton (1723–1783), British politician
- George Manners-Sutton (1751–1804), British politician
- John Manners-Sutton (1752–1826), British soldier and politician
- John Manners-Sutton, 3rd Viscount Canterbury (1814–1877)
- John Manners-Sutton (1822–1898), British Conservative politician
- John Manners-Sutton, 3rd Baron Manners (1852–1927)
- Lord Robert Manners-Sutton (1722–1762)
- Thomas Manners-Sutton, 1st Baron Manners (1756–1842), British lawyer and politician
- Thomas Manners-Sutton (1795–1844), English clergyman

== Place ==
- Manners Sutton Parish, New Brunswick, Canada
