= Francis Cockayne-Cust =

British lawyer & politician (1722–1791)

Francis Cockayne Cust (1722 – 30 November 1791) was a British lawyer and politician who sat in the House of Commons between 1770 and 1791.

Cust was the second son of Sir Richard Cust, 2nd Baronet and his wife, Anne Brownlow, daughter of Sir William Brownlow, 4th Baronet and was baptised on 18 March 1722.

He was educated at Grantham Grammar School and Eton College in 1733. He was admitted at King's College, Cambridge in 1738 and was a fellow from 1742. He was also admitted at Middle Temple in 1735 and called to the bar in 1742. He suffered from deafness which interfered with his professional career but obtained good practice as a Chancery lawyer. He was much trusted by his family and he was regularly consulted in their affairs, although his irascible temper did not render dealings with him easy. In 1752 he was appointed Deputy recorder for Grantham. In 1760 he was appointed Deputy recorder for Boston.

Cust would have stood for Grantham at the 1761 general election if his brother John had contested Lincolnshire instead. But as John Cust remained at Grantham until his death in 1770, Francis had to wait nearly ten years. Lord William Manners planned an opposition at Grantham but in the event Francis Cust was returned unopposed as Member of Parliament for Grantham in the by-election on 2 February 1770. He was appointed Counsel to the Admiralty also Counsel to the University of Cambridge in 1771, holding the positions until his death. When Cust's uncle Savile Cockayne Cust died on 27 January 1772, he succeeded to the Cockayne Hatley estate and assumed name of Cockayne Cust. He became a bencher of Middle Temple in 1772 . In 1774 he had to withdraw from Grantham in favour of his nephew Brownlow. He was invited to stand at Helston by the party opposed to the Godolphin interest, on condition that if defeated he would petition. He and Philip Yorke of Erthig, a son-in-law of John Cust, were seated for Helston in March 1775 on a petition which impugned the working of the new charter given to the borough by the Government on 3 September 1774. He was elected unopposed at Grantham at the 1780 general election. Also in 1780, he became recorder of Grantham. He was returned again for Grantham in 1784. He also became treasurer of Middle Temple in 1784. Owing to his deafness and irritability, his attendance and conduct in Parliament was for a long time in doubt. He mistakenly believed that Lord Auckland intended to resign the auditorship of Greenwich Hospital, a place worth £100 p.a. which had been customarily annexed to his office of counsel to the Admiralty before Lord North's time. He applied to Pitt unsuccessfully to become auditor on 2 January 1790. He continued to sit for Grantham on his family's interest and was returned in 1790, but made no mark in his last Parliament.

Cockayne Cust died 30 November 1791.

Parliament of Great Britain
Preceded by Sir John Cust; Lord George Manners	Member of Parliament for Grantham; 1770 –1774; With: Lord George Manners	Succeeded by Sir Brownlow Cust; Lord George Manners
Preceded by Marquess of Carmarthen; Francis Owen	Member of Parliament for Helston; 1775–1780; With: Philip Yorke	Succeeded by Jocelyn Deane; Philip Yorke
Preceded by Peregrine Cust; Lord George Manners	Member of Parliament for Grantham; 1780–1791; With: George Manners-Sutton	Succeeded by Philip Yorke; George Manners-Sutton
