= Lord Robert Manners-Sutton =

British Army officer, courtier, and politician (1722–1762)

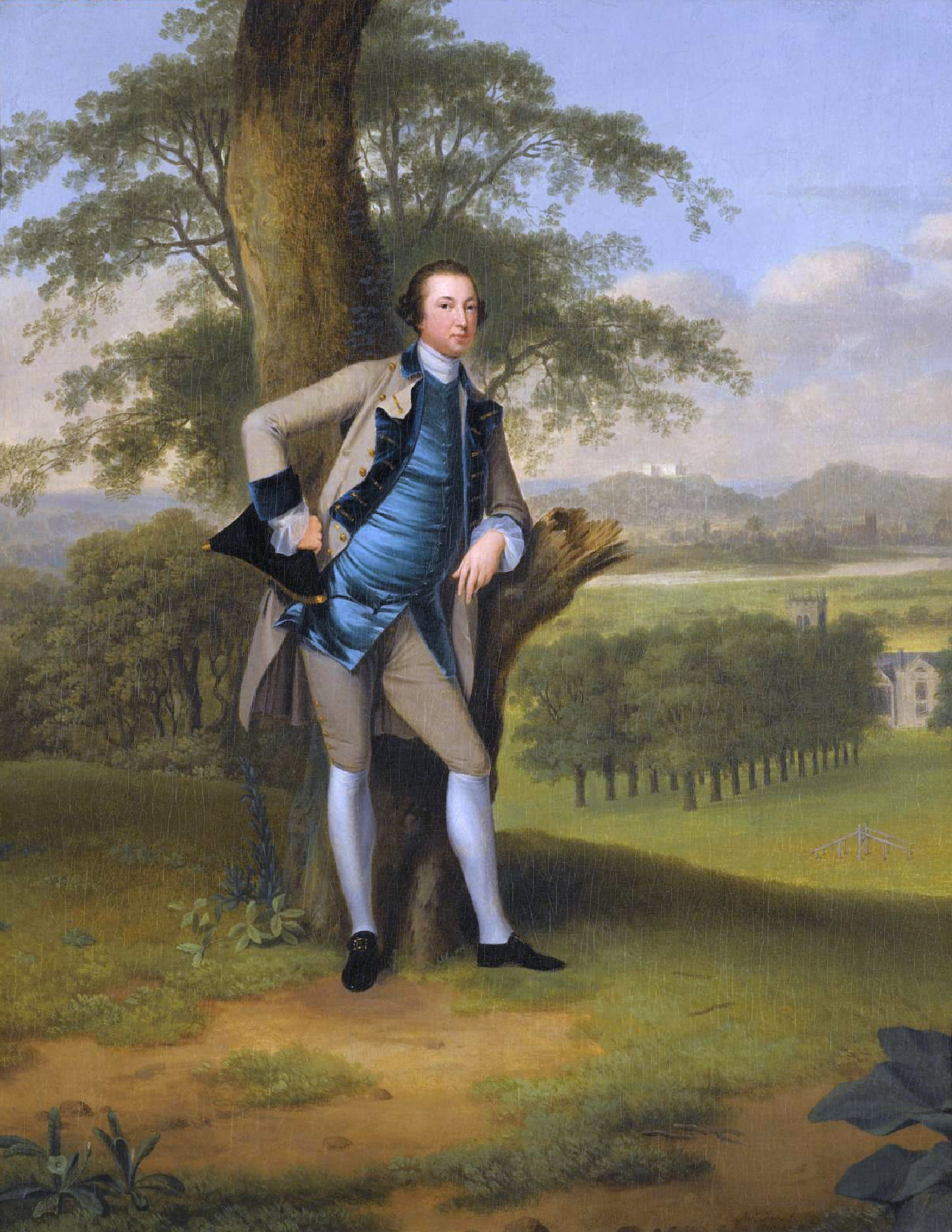
Portrait of Manners-Sutton by Arthur Devis

Lord Robert Manners-Sutton (born Robert Manners; 21 February 1722 – 19 November 1762) was a British Army officer, courtier and politician. He was the second son of John Manners, 3rd Duke of Rutland by his wife the Hon. Bridget Sutton, and younger brother of the famous soldier John Manners, Marquess of Granby, under whom he served as a lieutenant colonel in the 21st Light Dragoons.

He was a captain in the Duke of Kingston's Regiment of Light Horse in 1745 and a lieutenant-colonel in the Duke of Cumberland's Regiment of Light Dragoons from 1746 to 1748, with whom he served in Flanders during the War of the Austrian Succession. He was then appointed colonel commandant of the 21st Light Dragoons from 1760 to his death.

He also served as a Gentleman of the Bedchamber to Frederick, Prince of Wales from 1749 to 1751. He was appointed Master of the Staghounds on 26 April 1744 and Master of the Harriers from 11 April 1754 until 13 January 1756. From 6 July 1747 until his death he was one of the Members of Parliament for Nottinghamshire.

He adopted the additional surname of Sutton by a private act of Parliament, Younger Sons of the Duke of Rutland's Names Act 1734 (8 Geo. 2. c. 2 Pr.), on succeeding to the estates of his maternal grandfather the 2nd Lord Lexinton in 1734. These included Kelham Hall, near Newark, Nottinghamshire. He died without having married, and so the estates passed to his next brother Lord George Manners, who had also adopted the name Manners-Sutton.

Parliament of Great Britain
Preceded by William Levinz; John Mordaunt	Member of Parliament for Nottinghamshire; 1747–1762; With: John Thornhagh	Succeeded by John Thornhagh; Thomas Willoughby
Political offices
Preceded by The Duke of Kingston-upon-Hull	Master of the Staghounds; 1744–1762	Succeeded by William Byron, 5th Baron Byron
Preceded by vacant	Master of the Harriers; 1754–1756	Succeeded by vacant
