= Philip Yorke (antiquary) =

Welsh politician (1743–1804)

- Born: 30 July 1743 "Erddig Hall," Denbighshire, Wales
- Died: 19 March 1804 "Erddig Hall," Denbighshire, Wales
- Resting place: Church of St. Deiniol and St. Marcella, Marchwiel, Denbighshire, Wales
- Spouse(s): Elizabeth Cust (d. 1779) and Diana Wynne (d. 1805)
- Children: Simon Yorke (1771–1834) Ethelred Yorke (1772–1796); Elizabeth Yorke (1774–1795); Philip Yorke (1775–1777); John Yorke (1776–1792); Brownlow Yorke (1777–1803); Dorothy Yorke (1779–1846); Diana Yorke (1783–1855); Pierce Wynne-Yorke (1784–1837); Lucy Margaret Yorke (1785–1863); Robert Wynne-Yorke (1787–1854); Philip Wynne-Yorke (1787–1858) Charles Wynne-Yorke (1789–1853)
- Relatives: Simon and Dorothy Yorke (parents); Philip Yorke, first earl of Hardwicke
- Writing career
- Language: English
- Genre: Welsh genealogical history
- Notable work: The Royal Tribes of Wales (1799)

Philip Yorke (30 July 1743 – 19 February 1804) was a Welsh politician who sat in the House of Commons between 1775 and 1792 and an antiquary who developed an interest in Welsh history and genealogy relatively late in life. He was the author of The Royal Tribes of Wales (1799).

== Background ==
The son of Simon Yorke (1696–1767) and Dorothy Hutton (1717–1787), he was born at Erddig, not far from Wrexham (Denbighshire, Wales). He was related to Philip Yorke, first earl of Hardwicke, who was uncle to Simon's father Simon Yorke. His mother, Dorothy, was a daughter of Matthew Hutton of Newnham, Hertfordshire.

After receiving his basic education in Wanstead and at Newcome's School in Hackney, he went to Eton College and subsequently in 1762 to Benet College, Cambridge, where he was awarded an MA degree in 1765. He proceeded to Lincoln's Inn in 1762 and was 'called to the bar' in 1767. He took delight in classical literature, and became a fellow of the Society of Antiquaries in 1768.

== Marriages and career ==
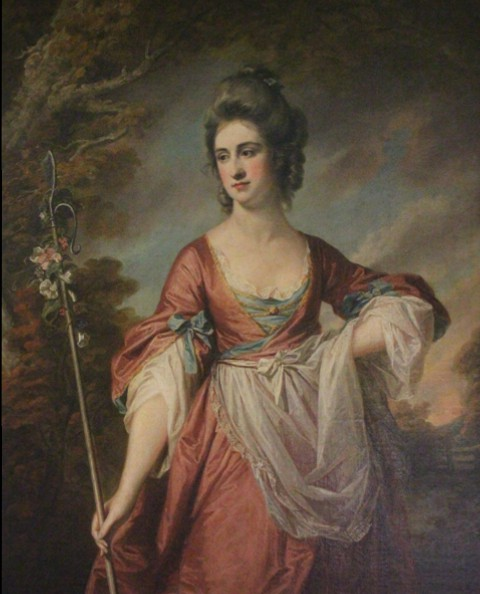
Elizabeth Yorke, first wife of Philip Yorke

Yorke married his first wife, Elizabeth Cust, daughter of Sir John Cust on 2 July 1770 and had two daughters and five sons. At the 1774 British general election, Yorke and his brother-in-law Francis Cockayne-Cust stood as candidates at Helston and were returned on petition on 15 March 1775. Elizabeth died in February 1779. At the general election of 1780 he was again returned at Helston, after a petition, but vacated his seat at the end of the first session of Parliament in June 1781. In 1782, Philip married his second wife Diana Meyrick, widow of Ridgeway Owen Meyrick of Bodorgan, Anglesey (died 1805), who was a daughter of Piers Wynne of Dyffryn Aled, Llansannan. They had two daughters and four sons.

Hardwicke offered Yorke a Parliamentary seat at Reigate at the 1784, but he declined because he did not want to live regularly in London. He was a country gentleman, honest and independent, but less interested in politics than in agricultural and antiquarian pursuits. He was High Sheriff of Denbighshire in 1786–1787. On 17 January 1792 he was returned as MP for Grantham by his brother-in-law, on the united Brownlow and Rutland interest, as a seat-warmer until his son Simon Yorke came of age. The Gentleman's Magazine (1804, p. 280) wrote, "His constitutional diffidence would not allow him to speak in the House of Commons."

His second marriage gave him a growing interest in Welsh history and genealogy. He began to study closely the ancestors of his wife, a descendant of Marchudd ap Cynan, lord of Uwch Dulas and said that he had come to "think the race of Cadwallon more glorious than the breed of Gimcrack," as he wrote in his Tracts of Powys, his first book on Welsh history and genealogy, which was published in 1795. He is remembered above all for a considerably longer work, The Royal Tribes of Wales, published in 1799 (see below).

After suffering with spasms on his chest, Yorke died on 19 February 1804, followed by his wife Diana in 1805. His public performances in high-level politics are said to have been rather restrained and according to C. J. Apperley, he was "one of the worst-dressed men in the country" and an incompetent horseman. He was nevertheless a noted conversationalist and storyteller and achieved a measure of fame for his performances as an amateur actor at the Wynnstay Theatre.

== Death and burial ==
A memorial inscription to him in the Church of St Deiniol and St Marcella in Marchwiel, Denbighshire, Wales, states:

In memory
of PHILIP YORKE of Erthig, Eſqre.
whoſe integrity of heart,
ſuavity of manners,
and intellectual endowments,
whilſt they endeared him to ſociety,
were to his own breaſt a perpetual ſource
of peace, complacency, and ſatisfaction.
He died on 19 February 1804,
in the 61st year of his age.

Go gentle Spirit, and from Heav'n receive
That high reward which Heav'n alone can give!
With conſciousneſs of years well-Spent depart,
Waiting His mercy ... can Search the heart.

== Works ==
His first genealogical book, the Tracts of Powys, was published in 1795, in a run of 70 copies. Dedicated to Thomas Pennant of Downing, it was based on a limited range of printed sources as well as on correspondence with scholars such as Walter Davies. The work details the history of the descendants of Bleddyn ap Cynfyn, offers a stern riposte to Polydore Vergil's negative appraisal of the early Britons, and devotes some space to the crown lordships of Powys. The appendix includes letters by Goronwy Owen and Lewis Morris.

The Tracts of Powys formed the basis for a considerably larger and better known work of his: The Royal Tribes of Wales, published in 1799. It was written with some help from Walter Davies. It set out to follow the so-called 'Five Royal Tribes of Wales' and the noble pedigrees that sprang from them. Yorke was initially sympathetic to the origin myth of the Welsh people, including the traditions which traced its descent from Trojan forebears, but later rejected such theories.

Yorke also worked on a history of "the Fifteen Common Tribes of Wales", but did not live to complete it.

Parliament of Great Britain
Preceded by Marquess of Carmarthen; Francis Owen	Member of Parliament for Helston; 1775–1780; With: Francis Cust; Jocelyn Deane; Richard Barwell	Succeeded by Richard Barwell; Lord Hyde
Preceded by Francis Cockayne-Cust; George Manners-Sutton	Member of Parliament for Grantham; 1792–1792; With: George Manners-Sutton	Succeeded by Simon Yorke; George Manners-Sutton
