= Lord George Manners-Sutton =

British nobleman and politician

Lord George Manners-Sutton (né Manners; 8 March 1723 – 7 January 1783) was a British nobleman and politician who was a Member of Parliament.

== Biography ==
Manners-Sutton was the third son of John Manners, 3rd Duke of Rutland.

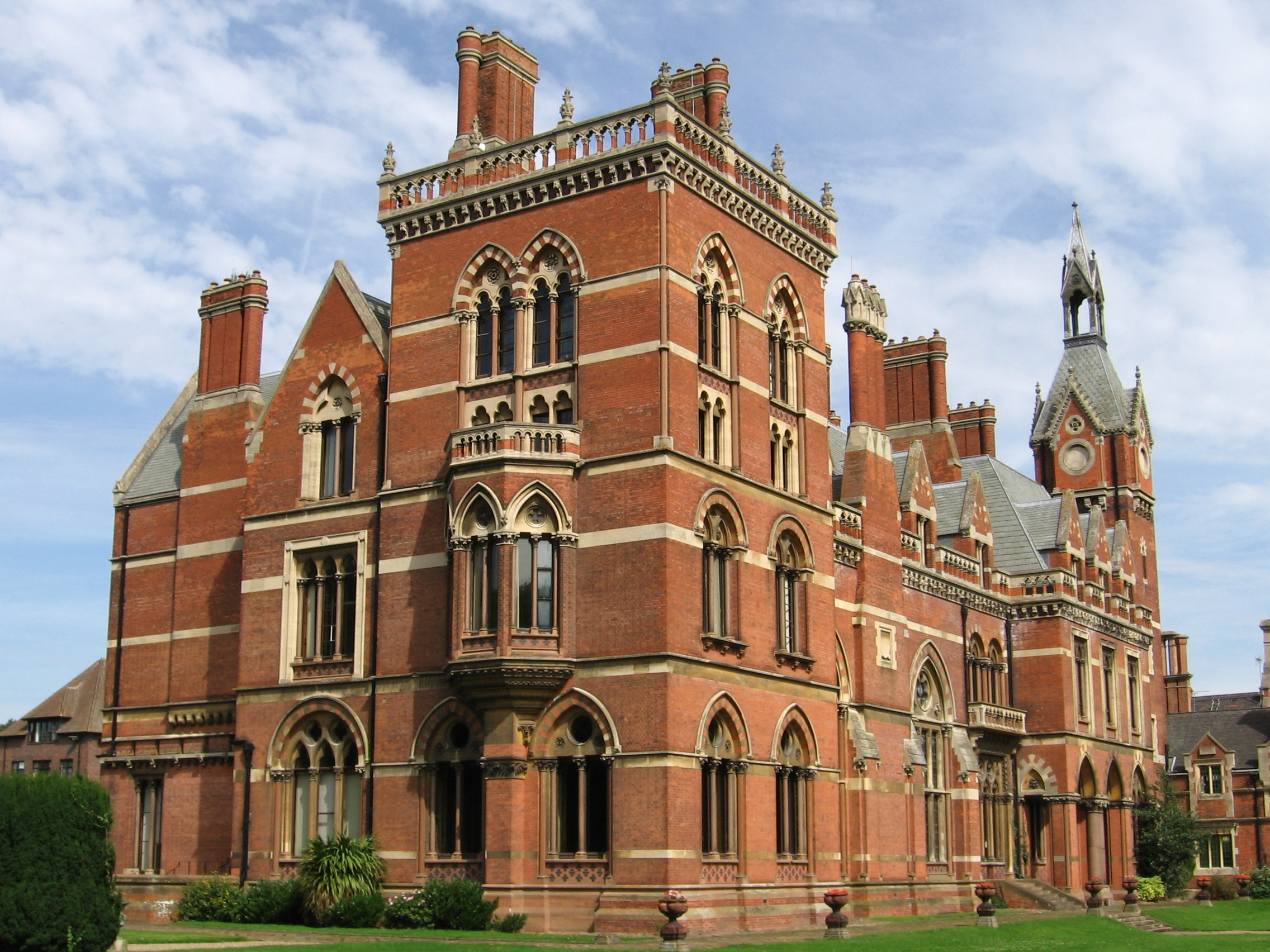
Kelham Hall

On 5 December 1749, he married Diana Chaplin (d. 1767), only daughter of Thomas Chaplin of Blankney, Lincolnshire, by whom he had nine children:

- George Manners-Sutton (1751–1804)
- Captain John Manners-Sutton (1752–1826), married Anne Manners, natural daughter of John Manners, Marquess of Granby, his first cousin
- Captain Robert Manners-Sutton, RN (1754–1794), killed in the explosion of HMS Ardent
- Charles Manners-Sutton (1755–1828), Archbishop of Canterbury
- Thomas Manners-Sutton, 1st Baron Manners (1756–1842)
- Captain Francis Manners-Sutton(d. 1781)
- Diana Manners-Sutton, married on 21 April 1778 Francis Dickins
- Louisa Bridget Manners-Sutton (d. 5 February 1800), married on 15 June 1790 Edward Lockwood-Perceval
- Charlotte Manners-Sutton (d. 1827), married on 16 June 1789 Thomas Lockwood

He entered Parliament in 1754, succeeding his elder brother, the Marquess of Granby as Member of Parliament for Grantham, representing Newark from 1780. In 1762, he adopted the additional surname of Sutton, upon inheriting the estates of that family, including the family seat of Kelham Hall, (the predecessor of the Hall pictured here) from his elder brother Lord Robert Manners-Sutton. The change of name, though, was enabled by a private act of Parliament, Younger Sons of the Duke of Rutland's Names Act 1734 (8 Geo. 2. c. 2 Pr.)—many years earlier—when his brother succeeded to those estates.

On 5 February 1768, he married Mary Peart, daughter of Joshua Peart, by whom he had one daughter:

- Mary Manners-Sutton (d. 20 November 1829), married in 1799 Rev. Richard Lockwood

When the Nottinghamshire Militia was reformed in 1775 he was appointed its Colonel, a position he held until his death.

He died at Kelham Hall in 1783 and was succeeded by his eldest son, George. He was buried in the chancel of St Wilfrid's Church, Kelham.

Parliament of Great Britain
Preceded by Marquess of Granby; Sir John Cust, Bt	Member of Parliament for Grantham; 1754–1780; With: Sir John Cust, Bt 1754–1770; Francis Cust 1770–1774; Sir Brownlow Cust, Bt 1774–1776; Peregrine Cust 1776–1780	Succeeded by Francis Cockayne-Cust; George Manners-Sutton
Preceded by Henry Clinton; George Manners-Sutton	Member of Parliament for Newark; 1780–1783; With: Henry Clinton	Succeeded by Henry Clinton; John Manners-Sutton
