= George Manners-Sutton =

British politician

George Manners-Sutton (1 August 1751 – 15 February 1804) was a British politician who sat in the House of Commons from 1774 to 1804.

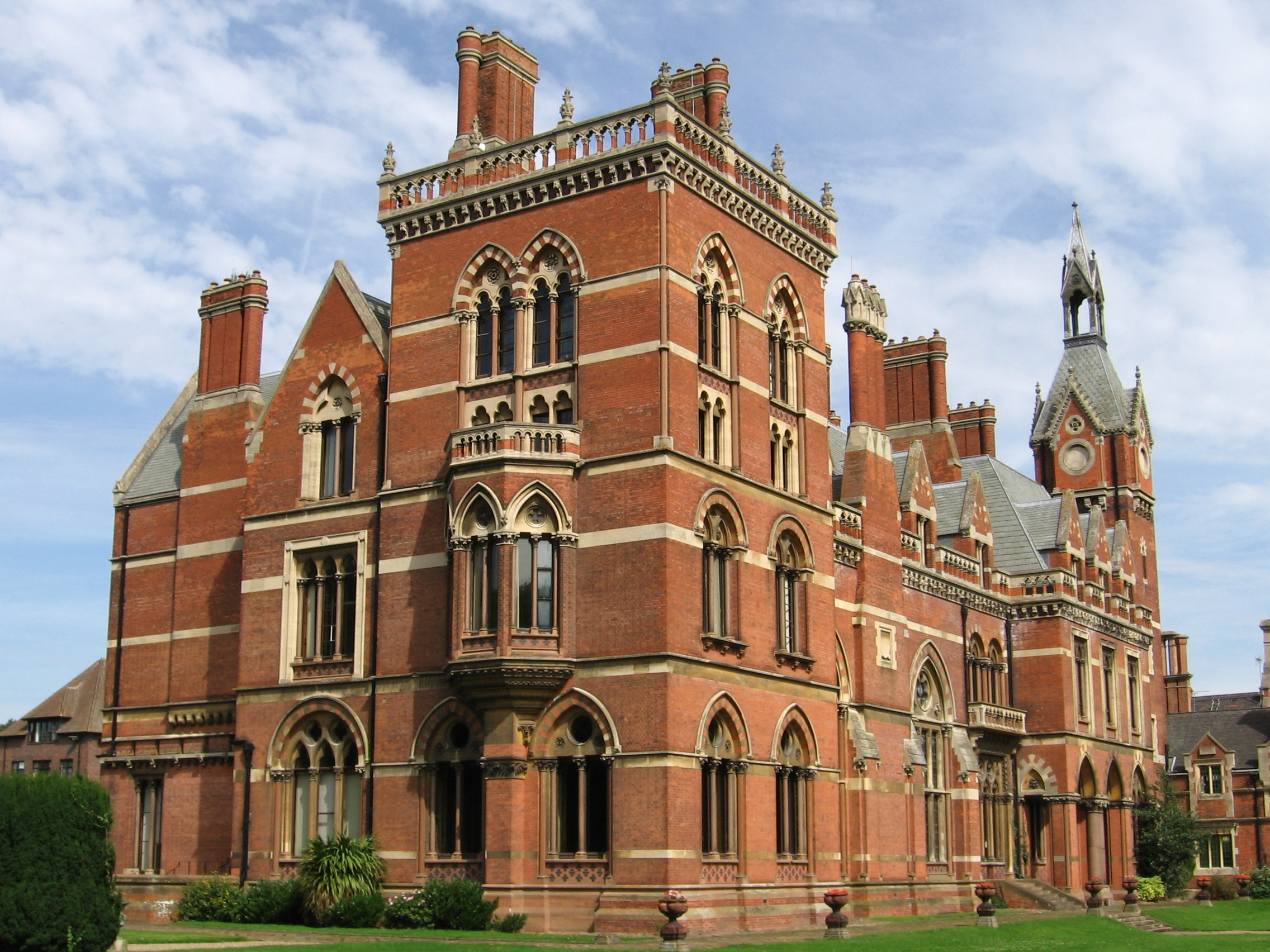
Kelham Hall

Manners-Sutton was the eldest son of Lord George Manners-Sutton and educated at Eton School and Trinity College, Cambridge. He succeeded his father in 1783, inheriting Kelham Hall near Newark.

He was returned as Member of Parliament for Newark from 1774 to 1780, and then for Grantham, a Manners family borough, until 1802, when he was returned for Bramber.

He died unmarried in 1804; his heir was his brother John Manners-Sutton.

Parliament of Great Britain
Preceded by John Manners; John Shelley	Member of Parliament for Newark; 1774–1780; With: Henry Clinton	Succeeded by Henry Clinton; Lord George Manners-Sutton
Preceded by Lord George Manners-Sutton; Peregrine Cust	Member of Parliament for Grantham; 1780–1800; With: Francis Cockayne-Cust 1780–1792; Philip Yorke 1792–1793; Simon Yorke, from 1793	Succeeded by Parliament of the United Kingdom
Parliament of the United Kingdom
Preceded by Parliament of Great Britain	Member of Parliament for Grantham; 1801–1802; With: Simon Yorke	Succeeded by Thomas Thoroton; Sir William Earle Welby, Bt
Preceded by James Adams; John Henry Newbolt	Member of Parliament for Bramber; 1802–1804; With: Henry Jodrell	Succeeded by Henry Jodrell; Richard Norman
