= Anthony Hart =

British lawyer

The Right Honourable Sir Anthony Hart

Lord Chancellor of Ireland
- In office 1827–1830
- Monarch: George IV
- Prime Minister: F. J. Robinson, 1st Viscount Goderich
- Preceded by: Lord Manners
- Succeeded by: Lord Plunket

Personal details
- Born: 1754
- Died: 6 December 1831 (aged 76–77)

Sir Anthony Hart (c. 1754 – 1831) was a British lawyer, who served as Lord Chancellor of Ireland from 1827 to 1830.

== Life ==
He was born into a slave-owning family about 1754 in the island of Saint Kitts, West Indies, fourth son of William Hart and Sarah Johnson. He said to have been educated at Tonbridge School and to have been a unitarian preacher at Norwich for a short time. He was admitted as a student of the Middle Temple in 1776 and was called to the bar in 1781.

He confined himself exclusively to equity work, and after practising twenty-six years at the outer bar was in 1807 appointed a king's counsel, and in the same year was elected a Bencher of his Inn. In 1816, he was made Solicitor-General to Queen Charlotte. Having been appointed vice-chancellor of the Court of Chancery in the place of Sir John Leach, he was appointed a privy Counsellor and knighted in 1827. He took his seat in the vice-chancellor's court in the following month.

Following the resignation of Lord Liverpool's ministry in March 1827 Lord Manners resigned as Irish Chancellor. His natural successor would have been Lord Plunket but George IV disapproved of Plunket's support for Catholic emancipation. Instead, Manners remained in post whilst a successor was found. Eventually, in October 1827, to the surprise of the Irish Bar, Lord Goderich offered Hart the post of Lord Chancellor of Ireland.

On accepting this office, Hart expressly stipulated ‘that he was to have no politics, general, local, or religious; and that of Papists and Orangemen he was to know nothing’. He was sworn in at Dublin on 5 November 1827, and took his seat in the Court of Chancery on the following day, when he immediately became involved in a serious misunderstanding with Sir William MacMahon, the Master of the Rolls in Ireland, in reference to the right of the latter to appoint a secretary.

Hart did his best to shorten equity pleadings, which he considered were ‘too prolix in Ireland’. While he was lord chancellor, a singular case affecting the rights of the Irish bar arose, a full account of which will be found in O'Flanagan's Lives of the Lord Chancellors of Ireland.

Upon the formation of Charles Grey, 2nd Earl Grey's administration towards the close of 1830, Lord Plunket was appointed in Hart's place. Hart sat as lord chancellor for the last time on 22 December 1830, and was addressed in a farewell speech by the veteran lawyer William Saurin, the former Attorney General for Ireland, on behalf of the Irish bar. It is stated ‘as a fact without precedent that not a single decision of his was ever varied or reversed’.

He died in Cumberland Street, Portman Square, London, on 6 December 1831. By his wife Martha Jefferson, he had one daughter, who was his sole heiress. An engraving taken from a portrait of Hart, sketched by Cahill, forms the frontispiece to the first volume of the ‘Irish Law Recorder.’

Political offices
Preceded by Lord Manners	Lord Chancellor of Ireland; 1827–1830	Succeeded by Lord Plunket
