= Sir John Shelley, 5th Baronet =

British politician

Sir John Shelley, 5th Baronet (1730 – 11 September 1783), of Michelgrove in Sussex, was a British politician who sat in the House of Commons from 1751 to 1780.

He was the eldest son of Sir John Shelley, 4th Baronet and Margaret Pelham, two of whose brothers (Henry Pelham and The Duke of Newcastle) served as British Prime Minister. He entered Parliament at a by-election in 1751, probably at the first opportunity once he was legally old enough to do so, as Member of Parliament for East Retford, a pocket borough owned by his uncle Newcastle; the vacancy arose from the appointment of the sitting MP as a Commissioner of the Excise, quite possibly with the specific intention of freeing the seat for Shelley. He represented this constituency until 1768 when, having fallen out with Newcastle, he moved to represent nearby Newark (which had once also been under Newcastle's control but now belonged to another of Newcastle's nephews, the Earl of Lincoln, who had also quarrelled with his uncle). He was later also MP for New Shoreham.

In 1755, on the recommendation of Newcastle (who had become Prime Minister on his brother's death the previous year), Shelley was appointed to the desirable sinecure-for-life of Keeper of the Records of the Tower of London, worth £420 a year. In 1757 he acquired another lucrative post, Clerk of the Pipe, and in 1766 he became Treasurer of His Majesty's Household and was appointed to the Privy Council.

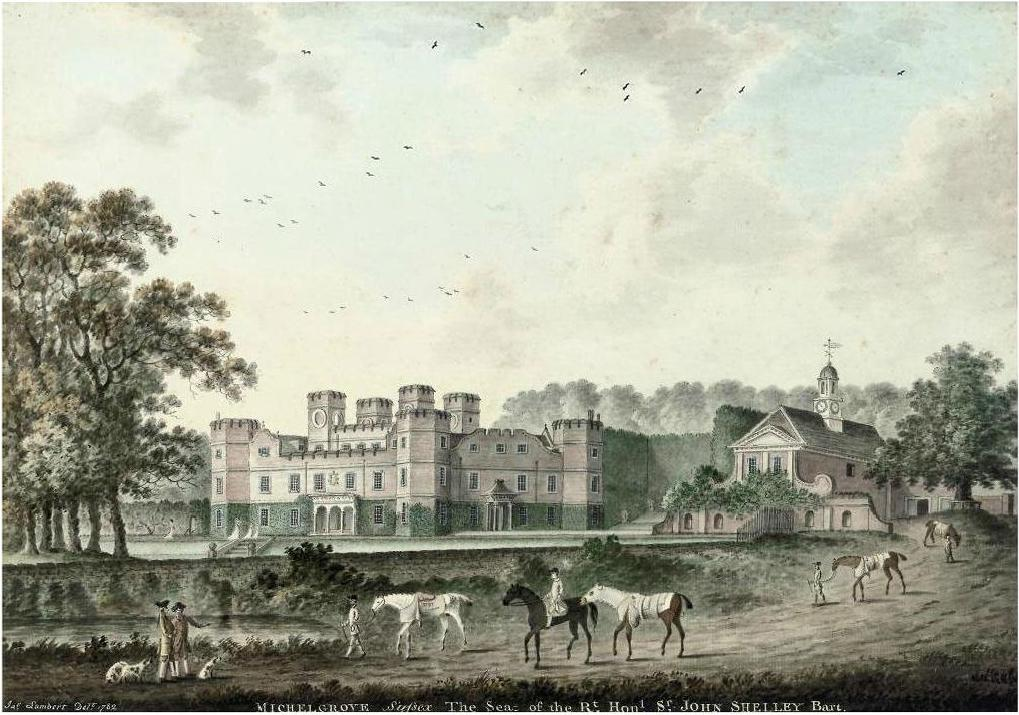
Michelgrove House, 1782

Shelley succeeded to the baronetcy on his father's death on 5 September 1771, taking possession of Michelgrove, Sussex. He married Wilhelmina Newnham (died 1772), daughter of John Newnham of Maresfield Park, by whom he had a son, John, who succeeded him. After the death of his first wife, he married again, to Elizabeth Woodcock, and they had three daughters.

He retired from Parliament in 1780, and died in 1783.

Political offices
Preceded by The Lord Edgcumbe	Treasurer of the Household; 1766–1777	Succeeded by The Earl of Carlisle
Parliament of Great Britain
Preceded by John White; William Mellish	Member of Parliament for East Retford; 1751–1768; With: John White	Succeeded by Sir Cecil Wray; John Offley
Preceded by John Manners; Thomas Thoroton	Member of Parliament for Newark; 1768–1774; With: John Manners	Succeeded by George Manners-Sutton; Henry Clinton
Preceded by Peregrine Cust; Thomas Rumbold	Member of Parliament for New Shoreham; 1774–1780; With: Charles Goring	Succeeded by Sir Cecil Bisshopp; John Peachey
Baronetage of England
Preceded by John Shelley	Baronet (of Michelgrove); 1771–1783	Succeeded by John Shelley
