= John Manners-Sutton (1752–1826) =

British soldier and politician

Lieutenant-colonel John Manners-Sutton (29 July 1752 – 17 February 1826) was a British soldier and politician who sat in the House of Commons from 1783 to 1796.

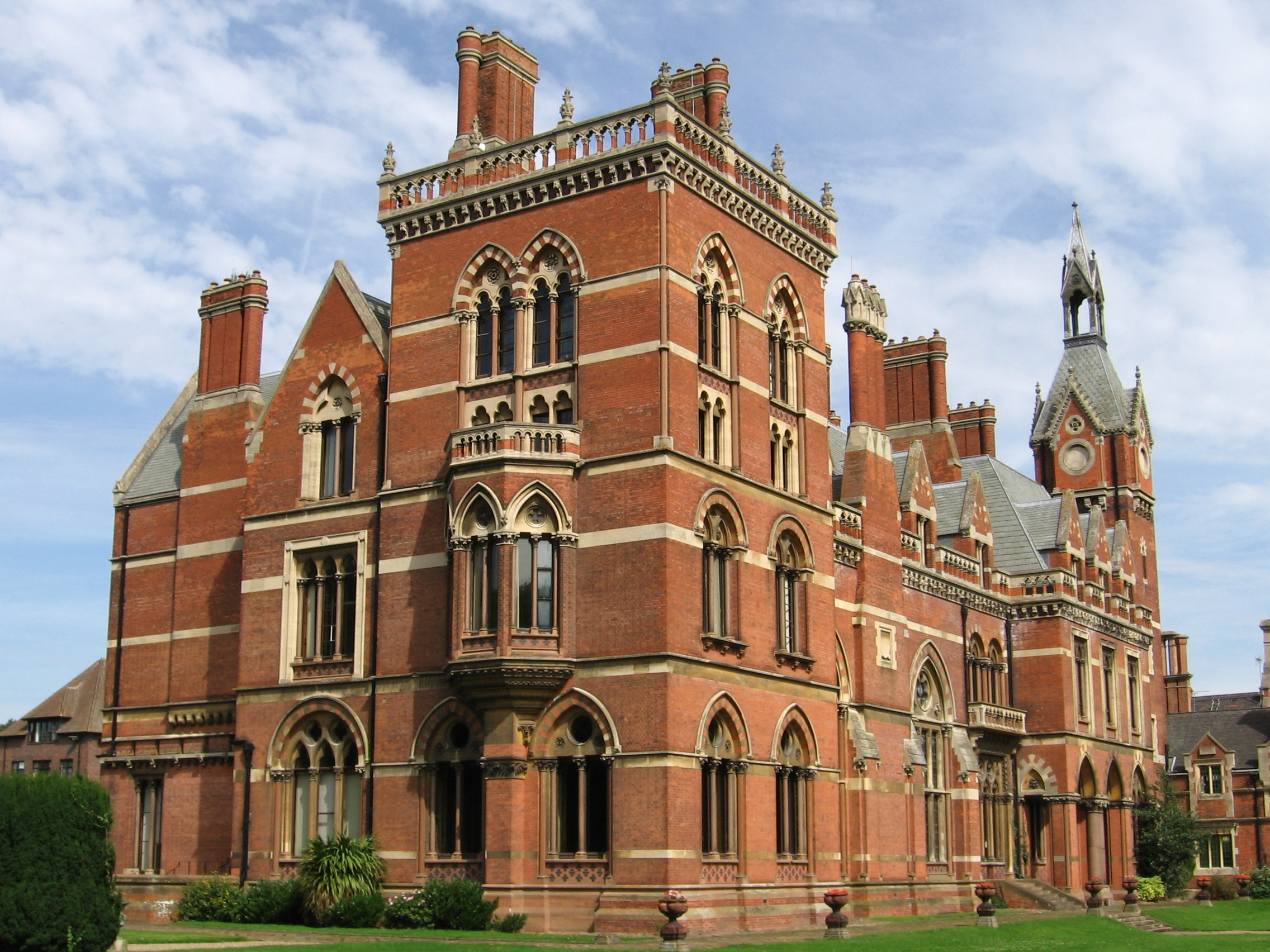
Kelham Hall

Manners-Sutton was the second son of Lord George Manners-Sutton. He joined the Army as an ensign in the 2nd Foot Guards (Coldstream Guards) in 1768. He was promoted to lieutenant and captain in 1775 and to lieutenant-colonel in 1780. He retired from the army in 1790.

Manners-Sutton was elected Member of Parliament for Newark at a by-election in 1783. He was re-elected in the general elections of 1784 and 1790 sitting until 1796. He succeeded his brother George Manners-Sutton, inheriting Kelham Hall near Newark, Nottinghamshire, and was appointed High Sheriff of Nottinghamshire for 1808–09.

Manners-Sutton married Anne Manners, the illegitimate daughter of John Manners, Marquess of Granby, his first cousin. The couple had six children:

- John Manners-Sutton, died unmarried
- Robert Manners-Sutton, d. 1815
- Rev. Frederick Manners-Sutton (1784 – 30 August 1826), married on 2 September 1821 Lady Henrietta Lumley, daughter of John Lumley-Savile, 7th Earl of Scarbrough and had issue, including John Manners-Sutton.
- George Manners-Sutton (d. 13 January 1836), unmarried
- Mary Georgiana Manners Sutton (b. 1790, d. 8 November 1846) who married in 1812 Robert Nassau Sutton, ancestor of actress Celia Imrie.
- Rev. Thomas Manners-Sutton (6 August 1795 – 27 October 1844), married on 23 November 1826 Lucy Mortimer and died without issue

Parliament of Great Britain
Preceded by Henry Clinton; Lord George Manners-Sutton	Member of Parliament for Newark; 1783–1796; With: Henry Clinton 1783–1784; The Lord Mulgrave 1784–1790; William Crosbie 1790–1796	Succeeded by Thomas Manners-Sutton; Mark Wood
