= Peregrine Cust (1723–1785) =

British politician

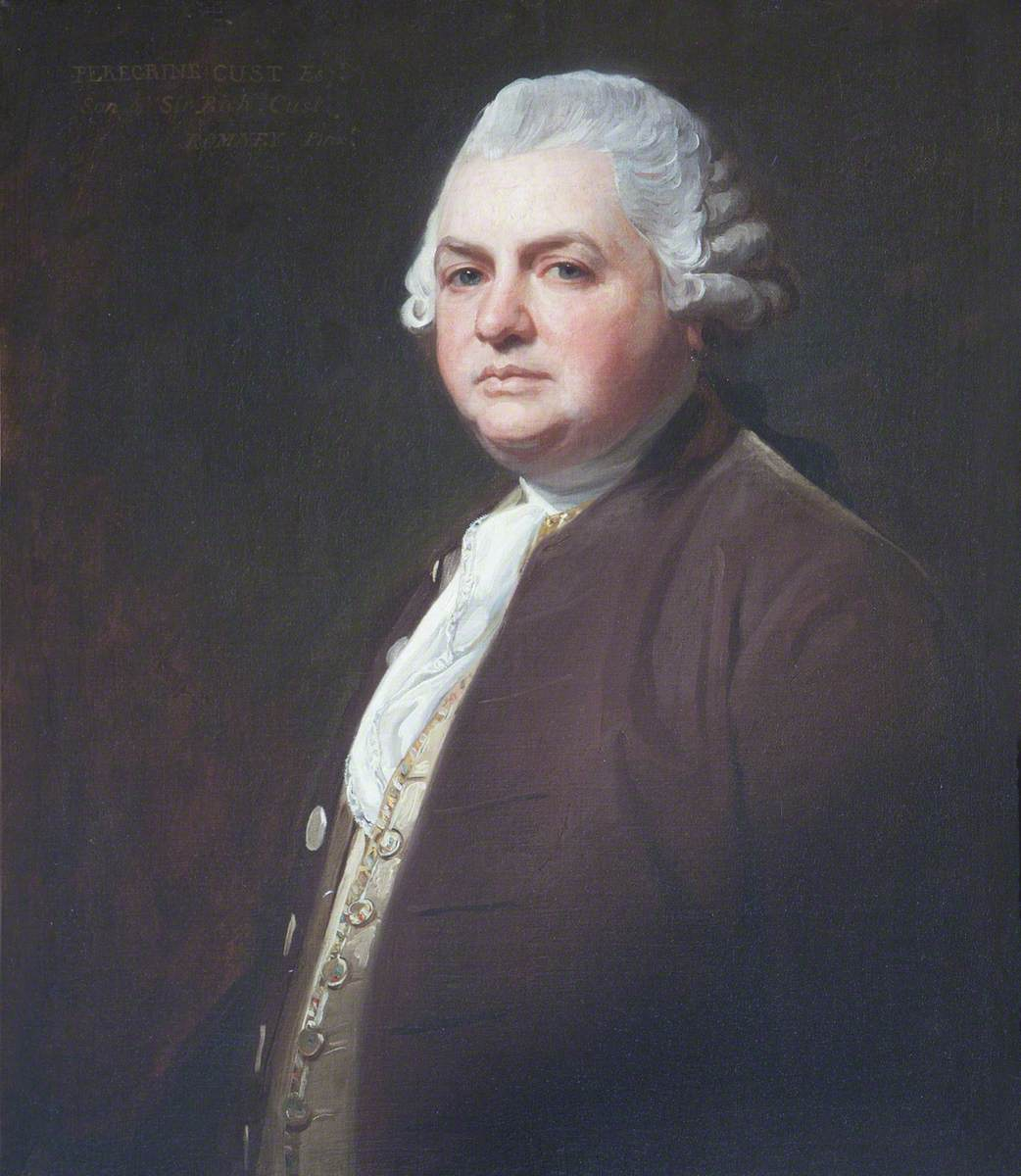
Peregrine Cust, 1775 portrait

Peregrine Cust (1723 – 2 January 1785) was a British politician and Member of Parliament (MP). He was also Deputy Chairman of the East India Company in 1769.

== Family and early life ==
Cust was born in 1723 and baptized on 19 May 1723. He was the fourth son of Sir Richard Cust, 2nd Baronet, and a younger brother of Sir John Cust and Francis Cust, both future politicians. Peregrine was educated at The King's School, Grantham, and apprenticed to a firm of linen drapers in 1739. He was sent to Holland in 1743 for his further education, where he learnt Dutch.

== Business career ==
He was a director of the East India Company from 1767 to 1769, serving as deputy chairman from 1769 to 1770.

== Political career ==
After investing £1,200 and having gained the interest of Charles Walcott, Cust was elected as MP for Bishop's Castle in 1761. He held the seat until 1768, when he was elected MP for New Shoreham. He represented New Shoreham until 1774, when he stood for Ilchester. Though he was declared to have been returned, a subsequent petition uncovered evidence of bribery and the election was declared void. Cust did not stand in the resulting re-election, but instead stood for Grantham in 1776, to which seat he was elected. He represented Grantham until 1780, when he again stood for Ilchester, and this time was declared duly elected. He was re-elected to the seat in 1784, and died the following year on 2 January 1785.

== Notes ==
Parliament of Great Britain
Preceded by John Dashwood-King; Henry Grenville	Member of Parliament for Bishop's Castle; 1761–1768; With: Francis Child 1761–1763; George Clive 1763–1768	Succeeded by George Clive; William Clive
Preceded by The Lord Pollington; Sir Samuel Cornish	Member of Parliament for New Shoreham; 1768–1774; With: Sir Samuel Cornish 1768–1770; John Purling 1770; Thomas Rumbold 1770–1774	Succeeded by Charles Goring; Sir John Shelley
Preceded by Peter Legh; Sir Brownlow Cust, Bt	Member of Parliament for Ilchester; 1774–1775; With: William Innes	Succeeded by Nathaniel Webb; Owen Salusbury Brereton
Preceded by Sir Brownlow Cust, Bt; Lord George Manners	Member of Parliament for Grantham; 1776–1780; With: Lord George Manners	Succeeded by Francis Cockayne-Cust; George Manners-Sutton
Preceded by Nathaniel Webb; Owen Salusbury Brereton	Member of Parliament for Ilchester; 1780–1784; With: Samuel Smith 1780–1784; Benjamin Bond-Hopkins 1784	Succeeded by John Harcourt; Benjamin Bond-Hopkins
