= Simon Yorke =

Welsh politician

Simon Yorke (27 July 1771 – 12 December 1834) was a Welsh politician who sat in the House of Commons from 1793 to 1802.

Yorke was the son of Philip Yorke of Erddig and his first wife Elizabeth Cust daughter of Sir John Cust, 3rd Baronet, and was born on 27 July 1771. He was educated at Eton College in 1784 and entered St John's College, Cambridge, on 29 November 1788. He married Margaret Holland, daughter of John Holland of Terydan on 11 March 1807.

Yorke was returned as Member of Parliament for Grantham on the united Brownlow and Rutland interest in a by election on 7 January 1793. The vacancy had arisen six months earlier, but as he was then under age, his father filled the seat in the meantime. No speech or vote of his is known. He was a lieutenant in the Wrexham yeomanry from 1795 to 1797. In the 1796 general election, he headed the poll at Grantham, but he declined to stand in 1802. He was High Sheriff of Denbighshire in 1807–8.

Yorke died on 12 December 1834.

== Sources ==
Parliament of Great Britain
Preceded by Philip Yorke; George Manners-Sutton	Member of Parliament for Grantham; 1793–1800; With: George Manners-Sutton	Succeeded by Parliament of the United Kingdom
Parliament of the United Kingdom
Preceded by Parliament of Great Britain	Member of Parliament for Grantham; 1801–1802; With: George Manners-Sutton	Succeeded by Thomas Thoroton; Sir William Earle Welby, Bt
