= Thomas Manners-Sutton, 1st Baron Manners =

British lawyer and politician

The Right Honourable The Lord Manners PC
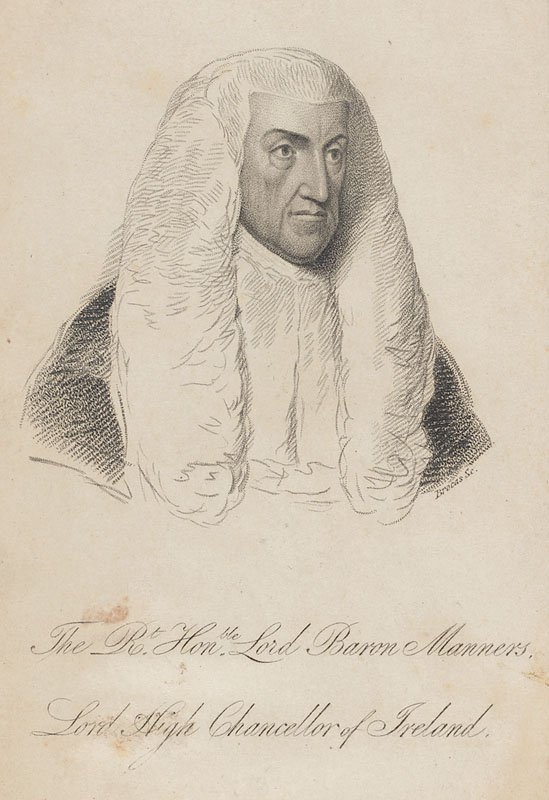
- Lord Manners

Lord Chancellor of Ireland
- In office 1807–1827
- Monarchs: George III; George IV
- Prime Minister: The Duke of Portland; Spencer Perceval; The Earl of Liverpool
- Preceded by: George Ponsonby
- Succeeded by: Sir Anthony Hart

Personal details
- Born: 24 February 1756
- Died: 31 May 1842 (aged 86)
- Spouse(s): (1) Anne Copley (d. 1814) (2) Hon. Jane Butler
- Education: Emmanuel College, Cambridge

Thomas Manners-Sutton, 1st Baron Manners, PC (24 February 1756 – 31 May 1842) was a British lawyer and politician who served as Lord Chancellor of Ireland from 1807 to 1827.

== Background and education ==
Manners-Sutton was the sixth son of Lord George Manners-Sutton (third son of John Manners, 3rd Duke of Rutland) and his wife Diana Chaplin, daughter of Thomas Chaplin. His elder brother the Most Reverend Charles Manners-Sutton was Archbishop of Canterbury from 1805 to 1828 and the father of Charles Manners-Sutton, 1st Viscount Canterbury, Speaker of the House of Commons from 1817 to 1834. His father had assumed the additional surname of Sutton on succeeding to the estates of his maternal grandfather Robert Sutton, 2nd Baron Lexinton.

Manners-Sutton was educated at Charterhouse School and Emmanuel College, Cambridge (matriculated 1773, graduated B.A. as 5th wrangler 1777, M.A. 1780), was admitted to Lincoln's Inn in 1775, and called to the Bar in 1780.

== Political, legal and judicial career ==
Manners-Sutton was elected Member of Parliament for Newark in 1796, a seat he held until 1805, and served under Henry Addington as Solicitor-General from 1802 to 1805. From 1800 to 1802 he was Solicitor General to the Prince of Wales (later King George IV).

In 1805 he became a Baron of the Exchequer, which he remained until 1807. The latter year he was admitted to the Privy Council, raised to the peerage as Baron Manners, of Foston in the County of Lincoln, and appointed Lord Chancellor of Ireland, in which position he served until 1827. A staunch protestant, Lord Manners was an opponent of Catholic emancipation and argued against the Roman Catholic Relief Act 1829 in the House of Lords. His unfamiliarity with Irish conditions led him to rely heavily on the Attorney-General for Ireland, William Saurin, who thereby acquired unprecedented power and virtually controlled the Dublin administration until his dismissal in 1822, which was caused by his firm opposition to Emancipation, which made him a political liability.

Although opposed to Catholic Emancipation, Manners as a judge showed no bias against Catholics: indeed he handed down a landmark ruling in Walsh's case in 1823, that in Ireland as opposed to England a bequest for the saying of Mass for the testator's soul was valid in law (English law was finally changed in favour of the validity of the bequest in 1919). The increasing number of Catholic barristers (even Daniel O'Connell, who had a low opinion of most Irish judges) paid tribute to his impartiality.

== Family ==
Lord Manners married firstly, Anne Copley, daughter of Sir Joseph Copley, 1st Baronet, of Sprotborough and his wife Mary Buller, in 1803. They had no children. After his wife's death in 1814, he married secondly the Honourable Jane Butler, daughter of James Butler, 9th Baron Cahir and Sarah Nicholls, and sister of Richard Butler, 1st Earl of Glengall. They had one son, John Manners-Sutton. Lord Manners died in May 1842, aged 86, and was succeeded in the barony by his only son, John. A family relation, Evelyn Levett Sutton, graduate of Trinity College, Cambridge, acted as private chaplain to Lord Manners.

Parliament of Great Britain
Preceded by John Manners-Sutton; William Crosbie	Member of Parliament for Newark; 1796 – 1800; With: Mark Wood	Succeeded by Parliament of the United Kingdom
Parliament of the United Kingdom
Preceded by Parliament of Great Britain	Member of Parliament for Newark; 1801 – 1805; With: Mark Wood to 1802; Sir Charles Pole, Bt from 1802	Succeeded by Henry Willoughby; Sir Charles Pole, Bt
Legal offices
Preceded by Sir John Mitford	Chancellor of Durham; 1791–1798	Succeeded by Samuel Romilly
Preceded by Spencer Perceval	Solicitor General for England and Wales; 1802–1805	Succeeded by Sir Vicary Gibbs
Political offices
Preceded by George Ponsonby	Lord Chancellor of Ireland; 1807–1827	Succeeded by Sir Anthony Hart
Peerage of the United Kingdom
New creation	Baron Manners; 1807–1842	Succeeded by John Thomas Manners-Sutton
