= Thomas Manners-Sutton =

English clergyman

Thomas Manners-Sutton (6 August 1795 – 27 October 1844) was an English clergyman who served as Chaplain to the Speaker of the House of Commons.

Manners-Sutton was the fourth son of Lieutenant-Colonel John Manners-Sutton. He was educated at Eton College and Trinity College, Cambridge (matriculated 1809, graduated B.A. 1813, M.A. 1817).

In 1824, Manners-Sutton was appointed the 52nd Chaplain to the Speaker of the House of Commons by his first cousin, Speaker Charles Manners-Sutton.

Manners-Sutton held the following positions in the church:

- Prebendary of Westminster Abbey, 1817–31
- Rector of Tunstall, Kent, 1827–36
- Rector of Great Chart, Kent, 1818–36
- Prebendary and Sub-Dean of Lincoln Cathedral, 1831–44
- Rector of Averham with Kelham, Nottinghamshire, 1837–44

On 23 November 1826, he married Lucy Sarah Mortimer, daughter of Rev. Hans Sanders Mortimer.

Manners-Sutton died on 27 October 1844.
