= Battle of Nauheim =

1762 battle of the Seven Years' War

Coordinates: 50.36482°N 8.72555°E

- Part of the Seven Years' War
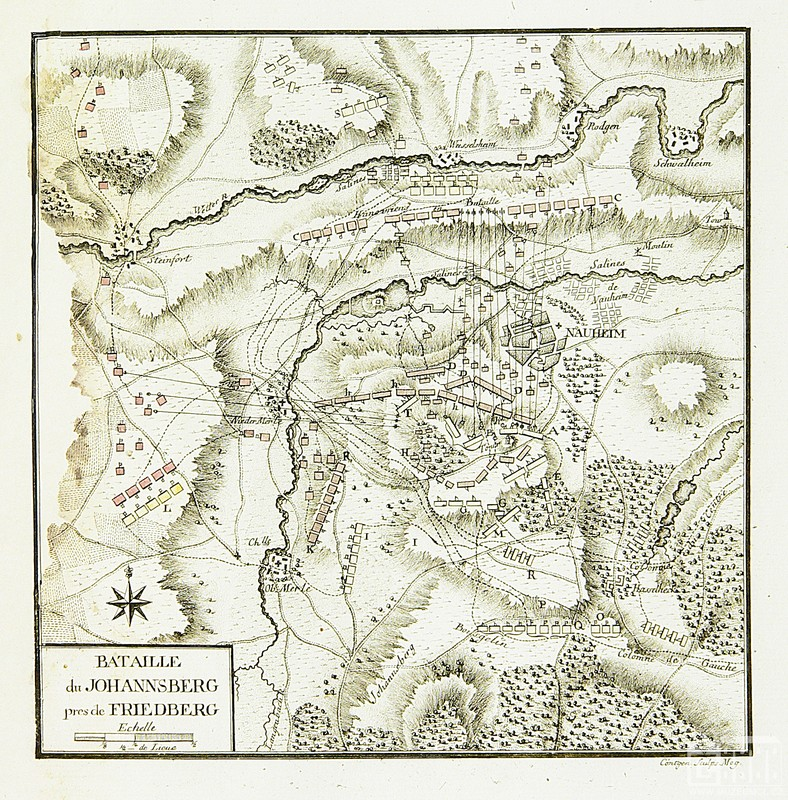
Date	30 August 1762
Location	Bad Nauheim, Landgraviate of Hesse-Kassel
Result	French victory

Belligerents
(Province of Hanover) Hanover; Hesse-Kassel; Prussia; Great Britain	France

Commanders and leaders
(Province of Hanover) Ferdinand von Braunschweig-Wolfenbüttel	(Kingdom of France) Louis Joseph, Prince of Condé

Units involved
Luckner's Corps: British 15th Eliot's Light Horse; Hereditary Prince's Corps	Réserve du Bas-Rhin; Stainville's vanguard

Casualties and losses
1,398 killed, wounded or captured 2 standards, 10 guns captured	500 killed and wounded

The Battle of Nauheim (also known as the Battle of the Johannisberg or Johannesberg) took place during the Seven Years' War near Bad Nauheim in the Landgraviate of Hessen-Kassel on 30 August 1762. French troops under the command of Louis Joseph, Prince of Condé defeated Hanoverian and British troops under the command of Duke Ferdinand of Brunswick.

== Sources ==
- Biography of the Marquis of Granby
- Jomini, Henri; Traité des grandes opérations militaires, 2ème édition, 4ème partie, Magimel, Paris: 1811, pp. 182–183
- Mauvillon, I.; Geschichte Ferdinands Herzogs von Braunschweig-Lüneburg, Part 2, Leipzig: 1794, pp. 245–249
- Pajol, Charles P. V., Les Guerres sous Louis XV, vol. V, Paris, 1891, pp. 421–426
- Castex, Jean-Claude (2007). Dictionnaire des batailles terrestres franco-anglaises de la guerre de sept ans. Presses Université Laval. ISBN 978-2-7637-8334-5.
