= Kelham Hall =

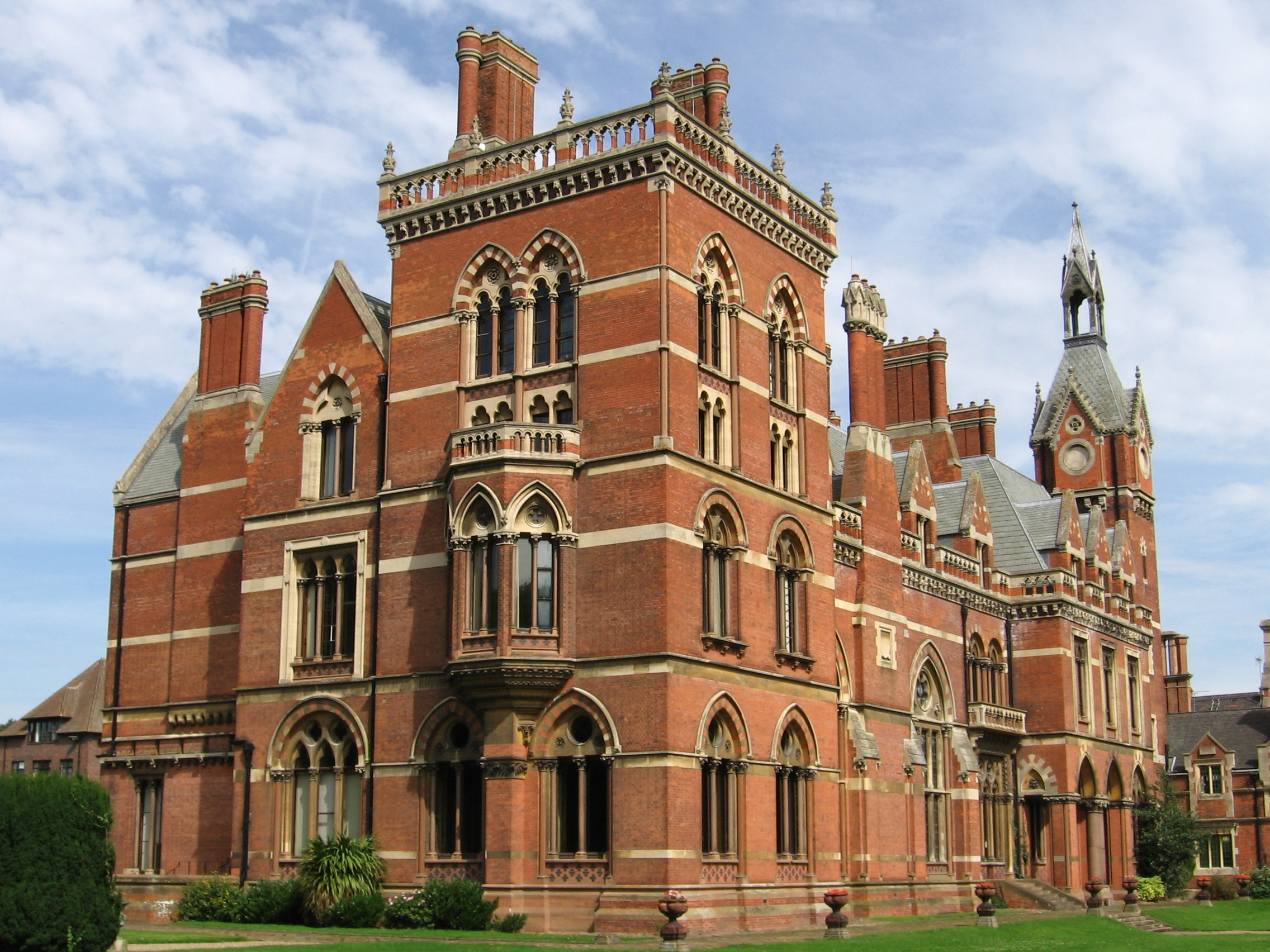

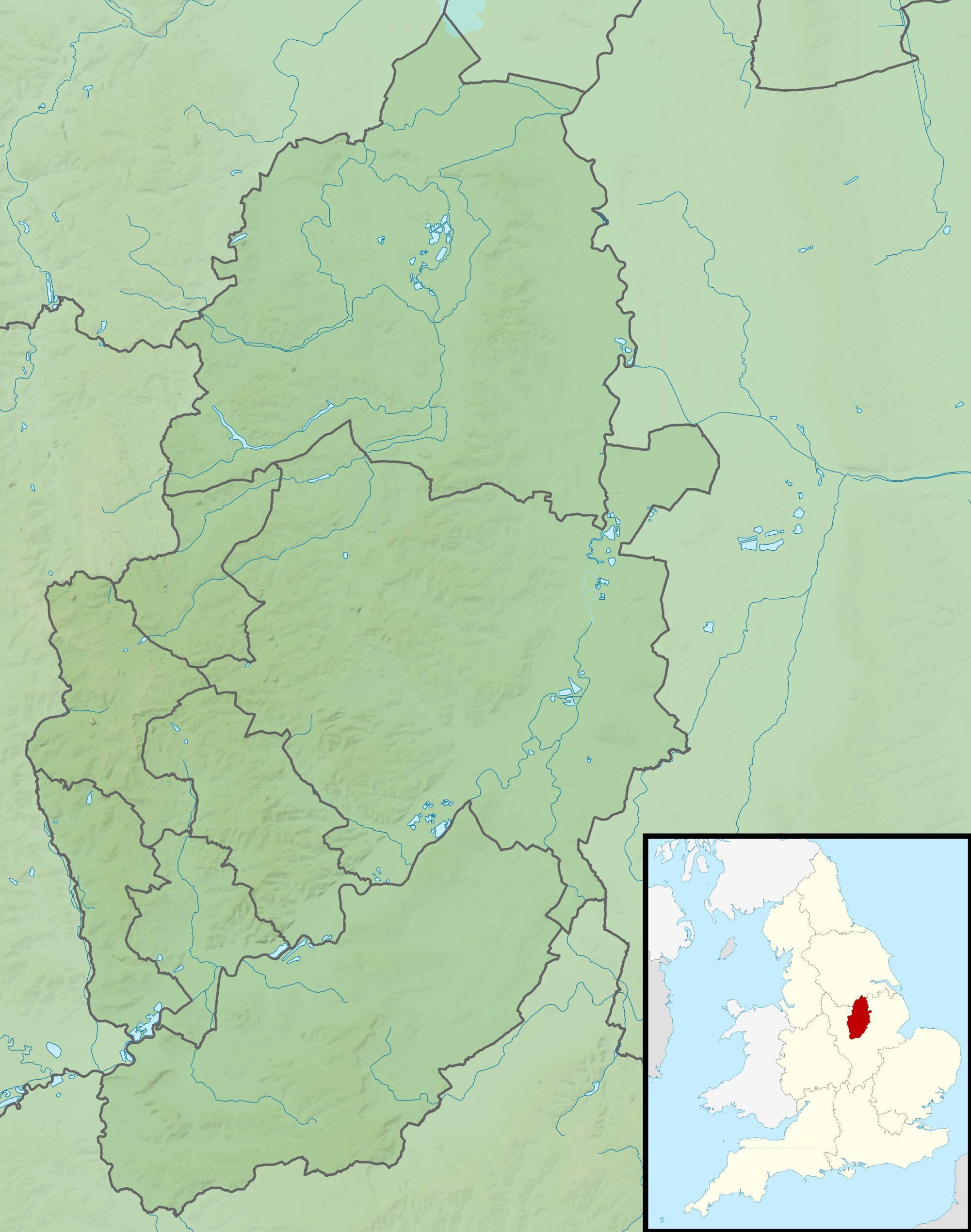
- Location within Nottinghamshire
- 53.0912°N 0.8452°W
- Type: House
- Location: Kelham, Nottinghamshire

History
- Built: 1859–1861

Site notes
- Architect: George Gilbert Scott
- Architectural style: Gothic Revival
- Owner: John Manners-Sutton
- Website: Kelham Hall

Listed Building – Grade I
- Official name: Kelham Hall
- Designated: 13 June 1973
- Reference no.: 1045982

Listed Building – Grade II*
- Official name: Gazebo and garden wall at Kelham Hall
- Designated: 19 September 1985
- Reference no.: 1045983

Listed Building – Grade II
- Official name: Former Monastic buildings adjoining Kelham Hall
- Designated: 8 November 1990
- Reference no.: 1045944

Listed Building – Grade II
- Official name: Lodge and Gateway at Kelham Hall
- Designated: 19 September 1985
- Reference no.: 1369984

Listed Building – Grade II
- Official name: Seven garden urns at Kelham Hall
- Designated: 19 September 1985
- Reference no.: 1178868

Kelham Hall is a country house designed by George Gilbert Scott. It is in the village of Kelham, Nottinghamshire, England.

It is protected as a Grade I listed building. It stands in 52 acres of parkland. The "Former monastic buildings and chapel", adjoining Kelham Hall, which "had been converted to offices and function room", have been Grade II listed since 1990.

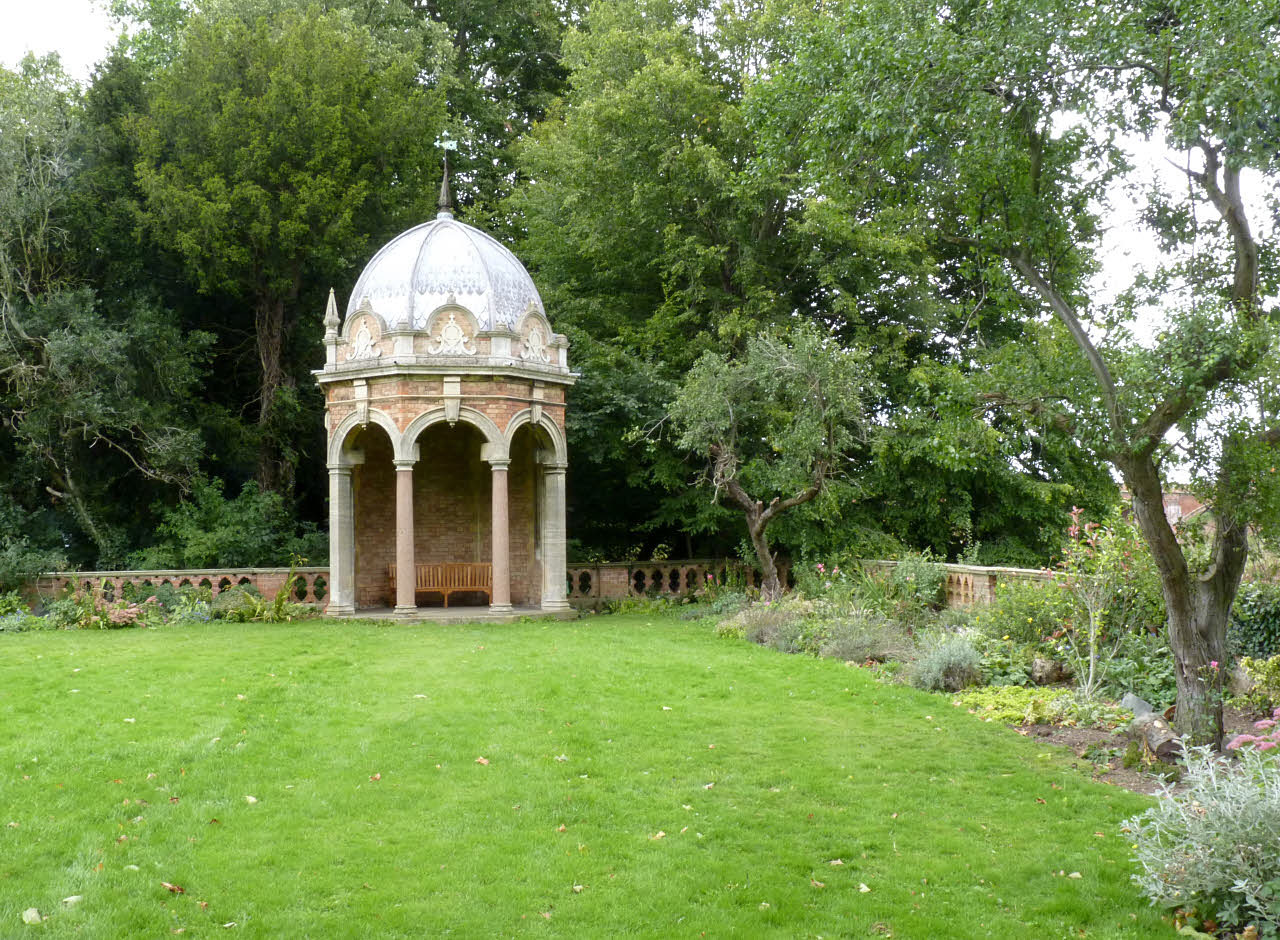
The Garden at Kelham

== History of the estate ==
Kelham Hall was originally the home of the Manners-Sutton family (a family connected to the Dukes of Rutland, the Marquess of Granby, and Viscount Canterbury) of Averham.

The Kelham estate was first acquired by William Sutton from the Foljambe family. "On 5 May 1647, King Charles I surrendered at the end of the English Civil War at nearby Southwell and was held at Kelham Hall for several days afterwards." The Hall was upgraded by William's son Robert Sutton, 1st Baron Lexinton after the Civil War. This first house was destroyed by fire in the reign of William and Mary.

Its replacement was built c.1730 by John Sanderson for Bridget, the Duchess of Rutland, the only surviving child of the second Lord Lexington. She had married John Manners, 3rd Duke of Rutland and their descendants would be known by the name of Manners-Sutton. This building was also destroyed by fire on 27 November 1857, during the Victorian era when the owner was in Italy, and would again be rebuilt.

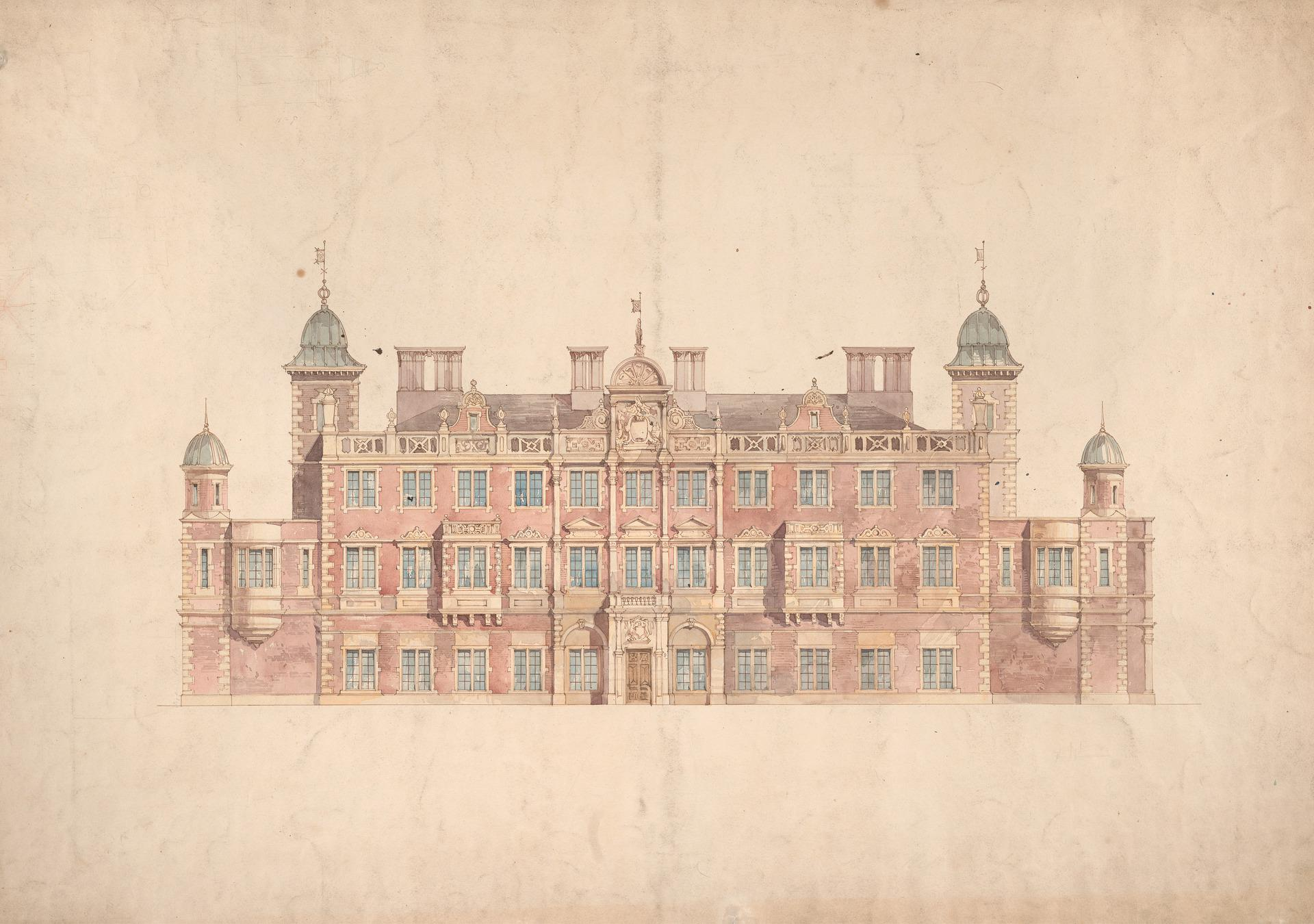
The original design for the hall

== Present building ==
Not long after the fire, "a new Kelham Hall, of magnificent proportions, and of an architectural beauty far superior to that possessed by its predecessors, either at Kelham or Averham was erected in the Italian style..."

=== Architecture ===
The third and present Kelham Hall "is considered a masterpiece of high Victorian Gothic architecture, entirely asymmetrical, with a gloriously irregular skyline, and crowning 'grandiloquent' towers." It was designed by Sir George Gilbert Scott and completed in 1863. The listing (1973, updated in 1990) included this summary: "Gothic revival style. 1859-61 ... Incorporates service range, 1844-46 by A. Salvin ... Service range in Renaissance revival style. Brick and ashlar with ashlar dressings, gabled, hipped and pyramidal slate roofs" and that it had been modified in the 19th and 20th century.

=== 20th-century history ===
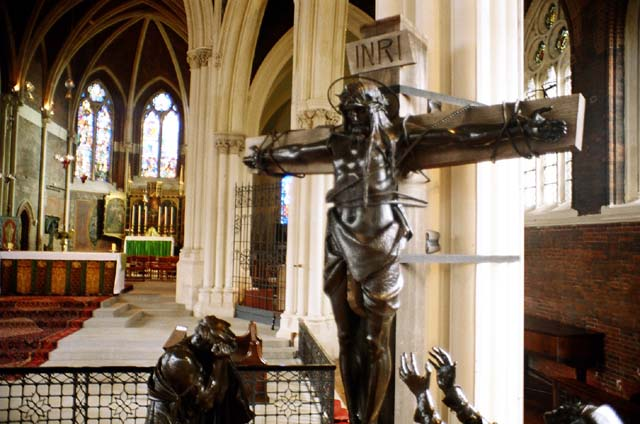
C. S. Jagger's Kelham Rood (1927–29), now in St John the Divine, Kennington, London

The Manners-Sutton family then ran into financial difficulties and the Hall was sold to the Anglican Society of the Sacred Mission in 1903 and run as a theological college. It was occupied by military forces during World War I. The Great Chapel "was dedicated in 1928 and was a masterpiece. It was almost square with a great central dome, (62 feet across and 68 feet (21 m) high), the second largest concrete dome in England. A few visitors said it reminded them of Stonehenge – massive, austere and mysterious."

A bronze sculpture, known as 'the Kelham Rood', depicting Christ on the Cross accompanied by figures of St John and the Virgin Mary was commissioned from the English sculptor Charles Sargeant Jagger to adorn the chapel in 1927, and was completed in 1929. "The main accommodation building at the front of the Hall was completed in 1939 to house the Monks and the theological students but its first occupants were a garrison of the 'Blues' cavalry and also Texas and Oklahoma oil men who were involved in drilling for oil at the nearby Eakring oilfield." The Hall was again occupied by military personnel during World War II.

The Society of the Sacred Mission theological college closed in 1972 due to declining numbers. The chapel was desanctified.

In 1973, the Hall became the head office of Newark and Sherwood District Council. Jagger's Kelham Rood sculpture was removed and re-erected at Society of the Sacred Mission's Willen Priory in Milton Keynes, where it stood in the garden until 2003 when it underwent restoration and was moved to the Church of St John the Divine, Kennington, in London.

=== 21st-century history ===
Kelham Hall was sold to Jonathan Pass in 2014 who formed a private company, Kelham Hall Ltd; he had previously held a temporary leasehold on the ground floor. In May 2015 Newark and Sherwood Concert Band moved its rehearsal base to Kelham Hall and now rehearses there weekly in the Dome.

The new owner took full possession after Newark & Sherwood District Council moved out of Kelham Hall into a new building close to Newark town centre in 2017.

The Hall was to become a prestigious hotel, conference centre and health spa, according to Jonathan Pass, managing director of Kelham Hall Ltd. Initially, Pass began redeveloping Kelham Hall & Country Park into a venue for weddings and conferences; that use commenced after planning consent was obtained. No overnight accommodation was offered.

The conversion to a hotel was not completed; an October 2019 news item indicated that Averham, Kelham and Staythorpe Parish Council had some objections to such a large hotel, since the previous application had proposed 71 bedrooms. By June 2020, however, another news source stated that the building was "ready to be used as a 103-bed hotel and spa with full planning consent to do so". Also in June 2020, the Corporate Hotels division of Christie & Co began to market Kelham Hall for sale with a guide price of £10 million, as a development opportunity: "a chance to create what could be one of the best hotels in the country".

After the former operators of the wedding and entertainments venue went into administration in June 2021 with cancellations of weddings due to COVID-19 restrictions, in September 2021 the Hall was being promoted as being under new ownership, renamed as The Renaissance at Kelham Hall, continuing as a wedding and entertainments venue.

=== Related building ===
In 1865 Gilbert Scott reused many of the design details of Kelham Hall on a much larger scale for the façade of the Midland Grand Hotel at St Pancras railway station in London, completed in 1876.
