= List of Great Britain by-elections (1790–1800) =

This is a list of parliamentary by-elections in Great Britain held between 1790 and 1800, with the names of the previous incumbent and the victor in the by-election.

In the absence of a comprehensive and reliable source, for party and factional alignments in this period, no attempt is made to define them in this article. The House of Commons: 1790–1820 provides some guidance to the complex and shifting political relationships, but it is significant that the compilers of that work make no attempt to produce a definitive list of each members allegiances.

== Resignations ==
See Resignation from the British House of Commons for more details.

Where the cause of by-election is given as "resignation", this indicates that the incumbent was appointed on his own request to an "office of profit under the Crown". Offices used, in this period, were the Stewards of the Chiltern Hundreds, the Manor of East Hendred or the Manor of Old Shoreham. These appointments are made as a constitutional device for leaving the House of Commons, whose Members are not permitted to resign. If the vacancy was caused by appointment to another office then this office is noted in brackets.

== By-elections ==
The c/u column denotes whether the by-election was a contested poll or an unopposed return. If the winner was re-elected, at the next general election and any intermediate by-elections, this is indicated by an * following the c or u. In a few cases the winner was elected at the next general election but had not been re-elected in a by-election after the one noted. In those cases no * symbol is used.

=== 17th Parliament (1790–1796) ===
Date	Constituency	c/u	Former Incumbent	Winner	Cause
20 December 1790	Haslemere	u	James Lowther	Richard Penn	Chose to sit for Westmorland
21 December 1790	Banbury	u	Lord North	Lord North	Succeeded to a peerage
21 December 1790	Oxford	c	Peregrine Bertie	Arthur Annesley	Death
22 December 1790	Heytesbury	u	William Pierce Ashe à Court	Michael Angelo Taylor	Resignation
22 December 1790	Huntingdon	u	John George Montagu	Henry Speed	Death
22 December 1790	Warwick	u	The Lord Arden	The Lord Arden	Registrar of the Court of the Admiralty
24 December 1790	Great Bedwyn	u*	Marquess of Graham	Viscount Stopford	Succeeded to a peerage
27 December 1790	Buckinghamshire	u*	William Wyndham Grenville	James Grenville	Elevated to the peerage
27 December 1790	Tavistock	u*	Charles William Wyndham	Lord John Russell	Chose to sit for Midhurst
28 December 1790	Monmouth	u	Marquess of Worcester	Charles Bragge	Chose to sit for Bristol
28 December 1790	Weobley	u*	Viscount Weymouth	Lord George Thynne	Chose to sit for Bath
29 December 1790	Buckingham	u	James Grenville	Sir Alexander Hood	Resignation to contest Buckinghamshire
29 December 1790	Petersfield	u	Lord North	Marquess of Titchfield	Resignation to contest Banbury
31 December 1790	Higham Ferrers	u	Viscount Duncannon	John Lee	Chose to sit for Knaresborough
4 January 1791	Yarmouth	u*	Thomas Clarke Jervoise	Jervoise Clarke Jervoise	Resignation
4 January 1791	Yarmouth	u	Edward Rushworth	Sir John Fleming Leicester	Resignation
7 January 1791	St Germans	u*	Edward James Eliot	William Eliot	Chose to sit for Liskeard
8 January 1791	Camelford	u	Sir Samuel Hannay	William Smith	Death
21 January 1791	Appleby	u	Robert Banks Jenkinson	William Grimston	Chose to sit for Rye
12 February 1791	Cambridge	u*	Francis Dickins	Robert Manners	Chose to sit for Northamptonshire
28 February 1791	Chichester	c*	Thomas Steele	Thomas Steele	Joint Paymaster of the Forces
1 March 1791	Dunwich	u	Barne Barne	Miles Barne	Resignation
2 March 1791	Tiverton	u*	Dudley Ryder	Dudley Ryder	Joint Paymaster of the Forces
8 March 1791	Heytesbury	u	Michael Angelo Taylor	The Earl of Barrymore	Chose to sit for Poole
12 March 1791	Poole	c	Benjamin Lester	Benjamin Lester	Seeks re-election due to holding an Admiralty contract
24 March 1791	Steyning	c(*)	Sir John Honywood	James Martin Lloyd	Chose to sit for Canterbury
24 March 1791	Steyning	c	James Martin Lloyd	Samuel Whitbread	By-election result reversed on petition 7 May 1792
28 March 1791	Lostwithiel	u	Viscount Valletort	George Smith	Chose to sit for Fowey
18 April 1791	Buckinghamshire	u*	The Earl Verney	Marquess of Titchfield	Death
27 April 1791	Harwich	u	Thomas Orde	Thomas Orde	Governor of the Isle of Wight
28 April 1791	Ludgershall	c	George Augustus Selwyn	Samuel Smith	Death
29 April 1791	Petersfield	u	Marquess of Titchfield	Welbore Ellis	Resignation to contest Buckinghamshire
2 May 1791	Minehead	u	Viscount Parker	Viscount Parker	Comptroller of the Household
4 May 1791	Stirling Burghs	c*	Sir Archibald Campbell	Andrew James Cochrane	Death
6 May 1791	Dorset	u*	William Morton Pitt	William Morton Pitt	Seeks re-election due to holding a contract to supply cordage
12 May 1791	Lymington	u	Harry Burrard	Nathaniel Brassey Halhed	Resignation (Riding Forester of the New Forest)
18 May 1791	Appleby	u	Richard Ford	John Theophilus Rawdon	Resignation
14 June 1791	Milborne Port	u	William Coles Medlycott	Richard Johnson	Resignation
15 June 1791	Edinburgh	u*	Henry Dundas	Henry Dundas	Home Secretary
17 June 1791	Dover	u*	Charles Small Pybus	Charles Small Pybus	Lord of the Admiralty
17 June 1791	Queenborough	u	Richard Hopkins	Richard Hopkins	Junior Lord of the Treasury
17 June 1791	Weymouth and Melcombe Regis	u	Thomas Jones	Sir James Johnstone	Resignation
18 June 1791	Haslemere	u*	Richard Penn	James Clarke Satterthwaite	Resignation
20 June 1791	Pontefract	u*	John Smyth	John Smyth	Lord of the Admiralty
26 August 1791	Newtown	u	Sir Richard Worsley	Sir Richard Worsley	Resignation due to attempt to be appointed as Governor of the Isle of Wight and was then re-elected
17 January 1792	Grantham	u	Francis Cockayne Cust	Philip Yorke	Death
18 January 1792	Warwick	c*	Henry Gage	George Villiers	Elevated to the peerage
25 January 1792	Merioneth	u*	Evan Lloyd Vaughan	Robert Williames Vaughan	Death
7 February 1792	Calne	u	John Morris	Benjamin Vaughan	Resignation
10 February 1792	Truro	u	William Augustus Spencer Boscawen	Charles Ingoldsby Paulet	Resignation (Commissioner of the Salt Office)
11 February 1792	Great Bedwyn	u	Lord Doune	Edward Hyde East	Death
20 February 1792	Malmesbury	u	Paul Benfield	Sir James Sanderson	Resignation
21 February 1792	St Mawes	u	John Graves Simcoe	Thomas Calvert	Resignation (Lieutenant Governor of Upper Canada)
27 February 1792	Leicestershire	u*	Sir Thomas Cave	Penn Assheton Curzon	Death
28 February 1792	Clitheroe	u	Penn Assheton Curzon	Assheton Curzon	Resignation to contest Leicestershire
7 March 1792	Rochester	c	Sir Richard Bickerton	Nathaniel Smith	Death
19 March 1792	Tewkesbury	u*	Sir William Codrington	William Dowdeswell	Death
7 May 1792	Malton	u*	William Weddell	George Damer	Death
15 May 1792	Huntingdonshire	u	Viscount Hinchingbrooke	Lancelot Brown	Succeeded to a peerage
18 May 1792	Aberdeen Burghs	u*	Alexander Callender	Alexander Allardyce	Death
16 August 1792	Monmouthshire	u	John Morgan	Robert Salusbury	Death
6 September 1792	Preston	u	John Burgoyne	William Cunliffe Shawe	Death
11 September 1792	Eye	u	Richard Burton Phillipson	Peter Bathurst (1723–1801)	Death
14 September 1792	Somerset	u	Edward Phelips	Henry Hippisley Coxe	Death
15 September 1792	Newcastle-under-Lyme	c*	John Leveson Gower	William Egerton	Death
21 September 1792	Banbury	u	Lord North	Frederick North	Succeeded to a peerage
24 October 1792	Winchelsea	u	Viscount Barnard	Sir Frederick Fletcher Vane	Succeeded to a peerage
18 December 1792	Cambridge University	u*	William Pitt the Younger	William Pitt the Younger	Lord Warden of the Cinque Ports
19 December 1792	Guildford	u*	Thomas Onslow	Thomas Onslow	Out-Ranger of Windsor Forest
7 January 1793	Grantham	u*	Philip Yorke	Simon Yorke	Death
8 February 1793	Lyme Regis	u*	Thomas Fane	Thomas Fane	Groom of the Bedchamber
13 February 1793	Newport (I.o.w)	u	The Viscount Melbourne	Peniston Lamb	Resignation
20 February 1793	Bere Alston	u*	John Mitford	Sir John Mitford	Solicitor General for England and Wales
20 February 1793	Weobley	u	Sir John Scott	Sir John Scott	Attorney General for England and Wales
22 February 1793	Newcastle-under-Lyme	c	Sir Archibald Macdonald	Sir Francis Ford	Resignation (Lord Chief Baron of the Exchequer)
6 March 1793	City of London	u*	Brook Watson	John William Anderson	Resignation
20 March 1793	Anstruther Easter	u	Sir John Anstruther	Robert Anstruther	Resignation
22 March 1793	Heytesbury	u	The Earl of Barrymore	Charles Rose Ellis	Death
30 March 1793	Knaresborough	u*	Viscount Duncannon	Lord John Townshend	Succeeded to a peerage
30 March 1793	Warwickshire	u*	Sir Robert Lawley	Sir John Mordaunt	Death
9 April 1793	Carmarthenshire	u*	George Talbot Rice	James Hamlyn	Succeeded to a peerage
17 April 1793	Great Grimsby	u	Dudley Long North	Dudley Long North	Void Election
17 April 1793	Great Grimsby	u	John Harrison	John Harrison	Void Election
28 May 1793	Heytesbury	u*	The Lord Auckland	The Viscount Clifden	Became a British Peer
26 June 1793	Shaftesbury	u*	William Grant	Paul Benfield	Second Justice of the South Wales Circuit
26 June 1793	Whitchurch	u*	John Thomas Townshend	John Thomas Townshend	Junior Lord of the Treasury
27 June 1793	Ludgershall	u	Samuel Smith	Nathaniel Newnham	Death
28 June 1793	Edinburgh	u*	Henry Dundas	Henry Dundas	President of the Board of Control
28 June 1793	Liskeard	u*	Edward James Eliot	Edward James Eliot	Commissioner of the Board of Control
28 June 1793	Marlborough	u	The Earl of Courtown	Earl of Dalkeith	Resignation
28 June 1793	Newtown	u	Sir Richard Worsley	George Canning	Resignation
28 June 1793	Rye	u*	Robert Banks Jenkinson	Robert Banks Jenkinson	Commissioner of the Board of Control
29 June 1793	Great Bedwyn	u	Viscount Stopford	Viscount Stopford	Treasurer of the Household
5 August 1793	Cockermouth	u	John Anstruther	John Anstruther	Chief Justice of the North Wales Circuit
13 September 1793	Higham Ferrers	u*	John Lee	James Adair	Death
24 October 1793	Horsham	u	James Baillie	William Fullarton	Death
3 December 1793	Queenborough	u	Gibbs Crawfurd	Augustus Rogers	Death
29 January 1794	Seaford	c	John Sargent	Richard Paul Jodrell	Clerk of the Ordnance
1 February 1794	Chipping Wycombe	c	Sir John Jervis	Sir Francis Baring	Resignation
1 February 1794	New Windsor	c	Peniston Portlock Powney	William Grant	Death
3 February 1794	Steyning	c*	John Curtis	John Henniker Major	Resignation
4 February 1794	Cardiff Boroughs	u*	Lord Mount Stuart	Evelyn James Stuart	Death
11 February 1794	Malmesbury	u	Benjamin Bond Hopkins	Francis Glanville	Death
14 February 1794	Plympton Erle	u	The Earl of Carhampton	William Manning	Resignation
15 February 1794	Milborne Port	u	Richard Johnson	Mark Wood	Resignation
15 February 1794	Queenborough	u	Augustus Rogers	John Sargent	Resignation
15 February 1794	Wilton	u*	Lord Herbert	Philip Goldsworthy	Succeeded to a peerage
17 February 1794	Winchelsea	u	Sir Frederick Fletcher Vane	John Hiley Addington	Resignation
3 March 1794	East Retford	u	Earl of Lincoln	William Henry Clinton	Succeeded to a peerage
5 March 1794	Banbury	u	Frederick North	William Holbech	Resignation (Comptroller of Customs for the Port of London)
12 March 1794	Wallingford	c	Nathaniel William Wraxall	Francis William Sykes	Resignation
5 April 1794	Cambridge University	u*	Earl of Euston	Earl of Euston	Chief Ranger of St. James Park and Hyde Park
11 April 1794	Perthshire	u*	James Murray	Thomas Graham	Death
1 May 1794	Ross-shire	u	William Adam	Francis Humberston Mackenzie	Resignation
3 May 1794	Bath	u*	Viscount Bayham	Sir Richard Pepper Arden	Succeeded to a peerage
9 May 1794	Hastings	u	Sir Richard Pepper Arden	Robert Dundas	Resignation to contest Bath
9 May 1794	Pontefract	u*	John Smyth	John Smyth	Junior Lord of the Treasury
12 May 1794	Rochester	u*	Nathaniel Smith	Sir Richard King	Death
12 May 1794	Tregony	u	John Stephenson	Robert Stewart	Death
21 May 1794	New Radnor Boroughs	u*	David Murray	Viscount Malden	Death
22 May 1794	Derbyshire	u*	Lord George Augustus Cavendish	Lord John Cavendish	Death
3 June 1794	Huntingdonshire	u	Lancelot Brown	Viscount Hinchingbrooke	Resignation
9 June 1794	Cricklade	u*	John Walker Heneage	Lord Porchester	Resignation
12 June 1794	Ayr Burghs	u*	Charles Stuart	John Campbell	Resignation
1 July 1794	Anstruther Easter	u	Robert Anstruther	William Dundas	Resignation
7 July 1794	Orford	u*	Earl of Yarmouth	Lord Robert Seymour	Succeeded to a peerage
12 July 1794	Norwich	c*	William Windham	William Windham	Resignation pending appointment as Secretary at War
14 July 1794	Castle Rising	u*	Henry Drummond	Charles Bagot Chester	Death
15 July 1794	Honiton	u	Sir George Yonge	Sir George Yonge	Master of the Mint
18 July 1794	Malton	u	Edmund Burke	Richard Burke	Resignation
19 July 1794	Bishop's Castle	u*	Henry Strachey	Henry Strachey	Master of the Household
26 August 1794	Southampton	c*	Sir Henry Martin	George Henry Rose	Death
9 September 1794	Wenlock	u*	Sir Henry Bridgeman	John Simpson	Elevated to the peerage
14 September 1794	Bedfordshire	u*	The Earl of Upper Ossory	John Osborn	Became a British Peer
15 September 1794	Clitheroe	u	Assheton Curzon	Richard Erle-Drax-Grosvenor	Elevated to the peerage
16 September 1794	Berkshire	u*	Winchcombe Henry Hartley	Charles Dundas	Death
18 September 1794	Lincolnshire	u*	Charles Anderson Pelham	Robert Vyner	Elevated to the peerage
19 September 1794	Scarborough	u*	The Lord Mulgrave	Edmund Phipps	Became a British Peer
20 September 1794	Cirencester	u*	Lord Apsley	Michael Hicks Beach	Succeeded to a peerage
3 October 1794	Weymouth and Melcombe Regis	u*	Sir James Johnstone	Gabriel Tucker Steward	Death
10 October 1794	Ludlow	u*	The Lord Clive	Robert Clive	Became a British Peer
17 October 1794	City Durham	u*	John Tempest, Jr.	Sir Henry Vane	Death
20 October 1794	Beaumaris	u*	Sir Hugh Williams	Sir Watkin Williams Wynn	Death
7 November 1794	Surrey	u*	William Clement Finch	Sir John Frederick	Death
10 November 1794	Stirlingshire	u	Sir Thomas Dundas	Robert Graham	Elevated to the peerage
22 November 1794	Anglesey	u*	William Paget	Arthur Paget	Death
5 January 1795	Hindon	u	William Thomas Beckford	Thomas Wildman	Resignation
9 January 1795	Launceston	c	Sir Henry Clinton	William Garthshore	Resignation (Governor of Gibraltar)
10 January 1795	Morpeth	u*	Francis Gregg	Viscount Morpeth	Resignation
10 January 1795	Wiltshire	u*	Sir James Tylney Long	Henry Penruddocke Wyndham	Death
12 January 1795	Petersfield	u	Welbore Ellis	Charles Greville	Elevated to the peerage
14 January 1795	Lichfield	u*	Thomas Gilbert	Lord Granville Leveson Gower	Resignation
15 January 1795	Westbury	u	Ewan Law	Samuel Estwick (younger)	Resignation
17 January 1795	Midhurst	u	Charles William Wyndham	Peter Isaac Thellusson	Resignation
21 January 1795	Malton	u*	Richard Burke	William Baldwin	Death
4 February 1795	Caernarvon Boroughs	u	Lord Paget	Lord Paget	Accepted a Commission in the Army
7 February 1795	Leicester	u*	Thomas Boothby Parkyns	Thomas Boothby Parkyns	Accepted a Commission in the Army
11 February 1795	Arundel	u	Henry Thomas Howard	Sir Thomas Gascoigne	Resignation to contest Gloucester
11 February 1795	Gloucester	u*	John Webb	Henry Thomas Howard	Death
14 February 1795	Fowey	u	Viscount Valletort	Sylvester Douglas	Succeeded to a peerage
20 February 1795	Chester	u*	Thomas Grosvenor	Thomas Grosvenor	Death
21 February 1795	Saltash	u	Viscount Garlies	William Stewart	Resignation
26 February 1795	Tiverton	u*	Sir John Duntze	Richard Ryder	Death
7 March 1795	Wendover	u	Lord Hugh Seymour	Lord Hugh Seymour	Lord of the Admiralty
9 March 1795	Dorset	u	Viscount Parker	Thomas Fownes Luttrell	Succeeded to a peerage
12 March 1795	City of London	c*	John Sawbridge	William Lushington	Death
13 March 1795	Bridport	c*	James Watson	George Barclay	Resignation (Puisne Justice in Bengal)
13 March 1795	Sandwich	u*	Sir Philip Stephens	Sir Philip Stephens	Lord of the Admiralty
23 March 1795	Kirkcudbright Stewartry	u*	Alexander Stewart	Patrick Heron	Death
26 March 1795	Preston	u*	Sir Henry Hoghton	Sir Henry Philip Hoghton	Death
27 March 1795	East Looe	u	William Wellesley Pole	Charles Arbuthnot	Resignation
4 April 1795	Montgomeryshire	u*	William Mostyn Owen	Francis Lloyd	Death
28 April 1795	Bridgnorth	u*	Thomas Whitmore	John Whitmore	Death
29 May 1795	Great Yarmouth	c*	Henry Beaufoy	Stephens Howe	Death
30 May 1795	New Shoreham	u*	John Clater Aldridge	Charles William Wyndham	Death
4 June 1795	Amersham	u*	William Drake	Thomas Drake Tyrwhitt	Death
19 June 1795	Helston	u*	Sir Gilbert Elliott	Charles Abbot	Resignation (Viceroy of Corsica)
24 July 1795	Banffshire	u	Sir James Grant	David McDowall Grant	Resignation (Cashier of Excise in Scotland)
14 August 1795	Northumberland	u*	Sir William Middleton	Thomas Richard Beaumont	Death
21 September 1795	Somerset	u*	Henry Hippisley Coxe	William Gore Langton	Death
26 September 1795	Rutland	u	John Heathcote	Lord Sherard	Death
28 September 1795	Berwick-upon-Tweed	u*	John Vaughan	John Callender	Death
21 October 1795	New Woodstock	u*	Lord Henry John Spencer	The Lord Lavington	Death
6 November 1795	Eye	u	Peter Bathurst	Viscount Brome	Resignation
10 November 1795	St Mawes	u	Thomas Calvert	William Drummond	Resignation
26 November 1795	Haddingtonshire	u*	John Hamilton	Hew Hamilton Dalrymple	Resignation (Receiver of Land Tax in Scotland)
27 November 1795	Westbury	u	Samuel Estwick	Edward Wilbraham Bootle	Death
6 January 1796	Beaumaris	u	Sir Watkin Williams Wynn	Sir Watkin Williams Wynn	Steward of Bromfield and Yale
12 February 1796	Hindon	u*	Thomas Wildman	James Wildman	Death
19 March 1796	Camelford	u	James Macpherson	Lord William Bentinck	Death
4 April 1796	Perth Burghs	u*	George Murray	David Scott	Resignation
16 April 1796	Bossiney	u	Humphrey Minchin	Evelyn Pierrepont	Death
25 April 1796	Forfarshire	u	David Scott	William Maule	Resignation to contest Perth Burghs
9 May 1796	Northampton	u*	Lord Compton	Spencer Perceval	Succeeded to a peerage
14 May 1796	Lincoln	u*	John Fenton Cawthorne	George Rawdon	Expulsion

=== 18th Parliament (1796–1800) ===
Date	Constituency	c/u	Former Incumbent	Winner	Cause
26 October 1796	Great Yarmouth	c	Lord Charles Townshend	Henry Jodrell	Death (Murdered)
26 October 1796	Great Yarmouth	c	Stephens Howe	William Loftus	Death
26 October 1796	Hereford	u*	John Scudamore	John Scudamore II	Death
26 October 1796	Peterborough	u*	Richard Benyon	French Laurence	Death
28 October 1796	St Mawes	u	George Nugent	Jeremiah Crutchley	Chose to sit for Buckingham
28 October 1796	Westbury	u	George Ellis	George William Richard Harcourt	Chose to sit for Seaford
29 October 1796	Stamford	u*	Sir George Howard	John Leland	Death
1 November 1796	Gatton	u	Sir Gilbert Heathcote	John Heathcote	Chose to sit for Lincolnshire
1 November 1796	Wareham	u	Charles Rose Ellis	Sir Godfrey Vassall	Chose to sit for Seaford
2 November 1796	Brecon	u*	Charles Gould Morgan	Sir Robert Salusbury	Chose to sit for Monmouthshire
4 November 1796	Ashburton	u*	Lawrence Palk	Walter Palk	Chose to sit for Devon
5 November 1796	Haslemere	u*	James Lowther	George Wood	Chose to sit for Westmorland
8 November 1796	Flintshire	c	Sir Roger Mostyn	Sir Thomas Mostyn	Death
8 November 1796	Flintshire	c	Sir Thomas Mostyn	John Lloyd	By-election result reversed on petition 12 June 1797
11 November 1796	Newport (I.o.w.)	u	Jervoise Clarke Jervoise	William Hamilton Nisbet	Chose to sit for Yarmouth
11 November 1796	Newport (I.o.w.)	u	Edward Rushworth	Andrew Strahan	Chose to sit for Yarmouth
22 November 1796	Malmesbury	c	Samuel Smith	Philip Metcalfe	Chose to sit for Leicester
22 November 1796	Southwark	c	George Woodford Thellusson	George Woodford Thellusson	Void Election
22 November 1796	Southwark	c*	George Woodford Thellusson	George Tierney	By-election result reversed on petition 21 December 1796
22 November 1796	West Looe	u	John Buller	John Hookham Frere	Resignation
30 November 1796	Ayrshire	u*	Hugh Montgomerie	William Fullarton	Became a Scottish Peer
8 December 1796	Bath	u*	Viscount Weymouth	Lord John Thynne	Succeeded to a peerage
9 December 1796	Higham Ferrers	u	James Adair	James Adair	Chief Justice of Chester
10 December 1796	Saltash	u	Edward Bearcroft	Charles Smith	Death
13 December 1796	Winchelsea	u	Richard Barwell	William Devaynes	Resignation
16 December 1796	Weobley	u	Lord John Thynne	Inigo Freeman Thomas	Resignation to contest Bath
2 January 1797	Derby	u*	Lord George Cavendish	George Walpole	Resignation to contest Derbyshire
7 January 1797	Petersfield	u	Hylton Jolliffe	Sir John Sinclair	Resignation
12 January 1797	Denbigh Boroughs	u	Richard Myddelton	Thomas Jones	Death
12 January 1797	Derbyshire	u*	Lord John Cavendish	Lord George Cavendish	Death
20 February 1797	Bletchingley	u	Sir Lionel Copley	Benjamin Hobhouse	Chose to sit for Tregony
20 February 1797	New Windsor	c	Henry Isherwood	Sir William Johnston	Death
22 February 1797	Aldborough	u	Richard Muilman Trench Chiswell	John Blackburn	Death
22 February 1797	Bossiney	u*	John Stuart Wortley	James Archibald Stuart	Death
22 February 1797	Midhurst	u	Sylvester Douglas	Sylvester Douglas	Junior Lord of the Treasury
10 March 1797	Canterbury	c	John Baker	John Baker	Void Election
10 March 1797	Canterbury	c	John Baker	Sir John Honywood	By-election result reversed on petition 12 May 1797
10 March 1797	Canterbury	c	Samuel Elias Sawbridge	Samuel Elias Sawbridge	Void Election
10 March 1797	Canterbury	c	Samuel Elias Sawbridge	George Gipps	By-election result reversed on petition 12 May 1797
21 March 1797	Yarmouth	u	Edward Rushworth	William Peachy	Resignation
3 May 1797	Stirling Burghs	u	Andrew James Cochrane Johnstone	William Tait	Resignation (Governor of Dominica)
8 May 1797	Scarborough	u	Lord Charles Henry Somerset	Lord Charles Henry Somerset	Comptroller of the Household
15 May 1797	Dunbartonshire	u	William Cunninghame Bontine	Alexander Telfer Smollett	Resignation
5 June 1797	Reading	u	Richard Aldworth Neville	John Simeon	Succeeded to a peerage
8 June 1797	Kincardineshire	u	Robert Barclay Allardice	Sir John Wishart Belches	Death
14 June 1797	Leominster	c	John Hunter	William Taylor	Resignation
30 June 1797	Buckinghamshire	u*	James Grenville	Earl Temple	Resignation
7 July 1797	Plymouth	u	Sir Frederick Leman Rogers	Francis Glanville	Death
25 July 1797	Newark-on-Trent	u*	Thomas Manners Sutton	Thomas Manners Sutton	Chief Justice of the North Wales Circuit
27 July 1797	Dover	c	Charles Small Pybus	Charles Small Pybus	Junior Lord of the Treasury
29 July 1797	Arundel	u	Sir George Thomas	Nisbet Balfour	Resignation
29 July 1797	Old Sarum	u	The Earl of Mornington	Charles Watkin Williams Wynn	Resignation
31 July 1797	Orford	u	Viscount Castlereagh	Earl of Yarmouth	Resignation
31 July 1797	Penryn	u*	Thomas Wallace	Thomas Wallace	Lord of the Admiralty
19 August 1797	Anstruther Easter Burghs	u*	John Anstruther	Alexander Campbell	Resignation (Chief Justice of Bengal)
15 September 1797	Newton	c(*)	Thomas Peter Legh	Thomas Langford Brooke	Death
15 September 1797	Newton	c(*)	Thomas Langford Brooke	Peter Patten	By-Election result reversed on petition 13 December 1797
25 October 1797	Leicestershire	u*	Penn Assheton Curzon	George Anthony Legh Keck	Death
6 November 1797	Liskeard	u	Edward James Eliot	The Earl of Inchiquin	Death
10 November 1797	Chichester	u*	Thomas Steele	Thomas Steele	King's Remembrancer
11 November 1797	Nottingham	u*	The Lord Carrington	Sir John Borlase Warren	Became a British Peer
15 November 1797	Norfolk	u*	Sir John Wodehouse	Jacob Henry Astley	Elevated to the peerage
16 November 1797	Marlborough	u	James Bruce	Robert Brudenell	Resignation
27 November 1797	Hythe	u	Sir Charles Farnaby Radcliffe	Charles Marsham	Death
2 December 1797	Tain Burghs	u	William Dundas	William Dundas	Commissioner of the Board of Control
14 December 1797	Andover	u*	Benjamin Lethieullier	Thomas Assheton Smith	Death
18 December 1797	Tewkesbury	c*	William Dowdeswell	Christopher Bethell Codrington	Resignation (Governor of the Bahamas)
23 December 1797	Great Bedwyn	u*	Thomas Bruce	Robert John Buxton	Death
3 January 1798	Newcastle-upon-Tyne	u*	Charles Brandling	Charles John Brandling	Resignation
8 January 1798	City Durham	u*	William Henry Lambton	Ralph John Lambton	Death
26 February 1798	Clackmannanshire	u	Sir Ralph Abercromby	Sir Robert Abercromby	Resignation
27 February 1798	Malton	u*	Viscount Milton	Bryan Cooke	Succeeded to a peerage
23 April 1798	East Looe	u	William Graves	Frederick William Buller	Resignation
28 April 1798	Ripon	u*	The Lord Headley	John Heathcote	Death
3 July 1798	Hastings	u	Sir James Sanderson	William Sturges	Death
5 July 1798	Malton	u*	William Baldwin	Charles Lawrence Dundas	Resignation
4 September 1798	Higham Ferrers	u	James Adair	Stephen Thurston Adey	Death
27 October 1798	Ripon	u*	William Lawrence	Sir James Graham	Death
1 November 1798	Leicestershire	u*	William Pochin	Sir Edmund Cradock Hartopp	Death
3 December 1798	Richmond	u*	Charles George Beauclerk	Arthur Shakespeare	Resignation
6 December 1798	Downton	u	Sir William Scott	Sir William Scott	Judge of the Admiralty Court
10 December 1798	Banffshire	u*	William Grant	William Grant	Chief Justice of Chester
28 January 1799	New Woodstock	u	The Lord Lavington	Charles Moore	Resignation (Governor of the Leeward Islands)
1 March 1799	Wareham	u	Lord Robert Spencer	Joseph Chaplin Hankey	Resignation
2 March 1799	Beverley	c	William Tatton	John Morritt	Death
2 March 1799	Lichfield	c*	Lord Granville Leveson Gower	Sir John Wrottesley	Resignation to contest Staffordshire
8 March 1799	Staffordshire	u*	Earl Gower	Lord Granville Leveson Gower	Joint Postmaster General and elevation to the House of Lords through a writ of acceleration
13 March 1799	Rye	u*	Lord Hawkesbury	Lord Hawkesbury	Master of the Mint
14 March 1799	Montgomeryshire	u*	Francis Lloyd	Charles Watkin Williams Wynn	Death
18 March 1799	New Radnor Boroughs	u*	Viscount Malden	Richard Price	Succeeded to a peerage
19 March 1799	Flint Boroughs	u*	Watkin Williams	Watkin Williams	Constable of Flint Castle
20 March 1799	Old Sarum	u	Charles Watkin Williams Wynn	Sir George Yonge	Resignation to contest Montgomeryshire
26 March 1799	Wendover	u*	George Canning	George Canning	Commissioner of the Board of Control
27 March 1799	Monmouth	u	Sir Charles Thompson	Lord Robert Edward Henry Somerset	Death
30 March 1799	Helston	u	Richard Richards	Lord Francis Godolphin Osborne	Resignation
2 April 1799	Mitchell	u	Sir Christopher Hawkins	John Simpson	Resignation
8 April 1799	Stockbridge	u	Joseph Foster Barham	John Agnew	Resignation
10 April 1799	Harwich	u	Richard Hopkins	Henry Augustus Dillon Lee	Death
19 April 1799	Gatton	u	John Heathcote	Walter Stirling	Resignation to contest Ripon
23 May 1799	East Looe	u	John Buller	John Smith	Resignation
27 May 1799	Norwich	c	Henry Hobart	John Frere	Death
28 May 1799	Ilchester	u	Sir Robert Clayton	Lewis Bayly	Death
17 June 1799	Plympton Erle	u	William Mitchell	Richard Hankey	Resignation
18 June 1799	Appleby	u	John Tufton	Robert Adair	Death
19 June 1799	Fowey	u*	Reginald Pole Carew	Edward Golding	Resignation (Commissioner for Auditing Public Accounts)
24 July 1799	East Looe	u	John Smith	Sir John Mitford	Resignation
29 July 1799	Bere Alston	u*	Sir John Mitford	Lord Lovaine	Resignation to contest East Looe
2 August 1799	Banffshire	u*	William Grant	Sir William Grant	Resignation pending appointment as Solicitor General for England and Wales
23 August 1799	Boroughbridge	u*	Sir John Scott	John Scott	Elevated to the peerage
3 October 1799	Argyllshire	u*	Lord Frederick Campbell	Lord John Campbell	Resignation
11 October 1799	Edinburghshire	u	Robert Dundas	Robert Dundas	Joint Clerk and Keeper of Sasines
30 October 1799	Eye	u*	Mark Singleton	James Cornwallis	Resignation
7 November 1799	Dunbartonshire	u*	Alexander Telfer Smollett	James Colquhoun	Death
8 November 1799	Flintshire	u*	John Lloyd	Sir Thomas Mostyn	Resignation
10 February 1800	Bramber	u	Sir Charles Rouse Boughton	John Henry Newbolt	Resignation (Commissioner for Auditing Public Accounts)
24 February 1800	Stirling Burghs	c*	William Tait	Alexander Forrester Inglis Cochrane	Death
17 March 1800	City Durham	c	Sir Henry Vane Tempest	Michael Angelo Taylor	Resignation
26 March 1800	Aldeburgh	u	Michael Angelo Taylor	George Johnstone	Resignation to contest City Durham
1 April 1800	Weobley	u	Inigo Freeman Thomas	Sir Charles Talbot	Resignation
5 April 1800	New Windsor	u*	Robert Fulke Greville	Robert Fulke Greville	Groom of the Bedchamber
9 April 1800	Lincoln	u*	George Rawdon	Humphrey Sibthorp	Death
18 April 1800	Westbury	u	George William Richard Harcourt	John Simon Harcourt	Resignation
29 April 1800	Gatton	u	John Petrie	James Du Pre	Resignation to contest Ripon
8 May 1800	Newport (I.o.w.)	u	William Hamilton Nisbet	Sir George Dallas	Resignation
12 May 1800	Haddingtonshire	u*	Sir Hew Dalrymple Hamilton	Charles Hope	Resignation
12 May 1800	Linlithgowshire	u*	John Hope	Alexander Hope	Resignation
22 May 1800	Dumfries Burghs	u	Alexander Hope	William Johnstone Hope	Resignation to contest Linlithgowshire
31 May 1800	Christchurch	u	William Stewart Rose	William Chamberlayne	Resignation
2 June 1800	Edinburgh	u*	Henry Dundas	Henry Dundas	Keeper of the Privy Seal of Scotland
5 June 1800	Wendover	u	George Canning	George Canning	Joint Paymaster of the Forces
7 June 1800	Tiverton	u*	Dudley Ryder	Dudley Ryder	Treasurer of the Navy
9 June 1800	Penryn	u	Thomas Wallace	Thomas Wallace	Commissioner of the Board of Control
9 June 1800	Rye	u	Robert Saunders Dundas	Robert Saunders Dundas	Keeper of the Signet for Scotland
16 June 1800	Wareham	u*	Sir Godfrey Webster	John Calcraft	Death
21 June 1800	Wigan	u	Orlando Bridgeman	George William Gunning	Succeeded to a peerage
23 June 1800	St Albans	u*	The Earl of Lucan	William Stephen Poyntz	Resignation
5 July 1800	St Germans	u	William Eliot	William Eliot	Lord of the Admiralty
15 July 1800	Whitchurch	u*	John Thomas Townshend	William Augustus Townshend	Succeeded to a peerage
28 July 1800	Buckingham	u*	Thomas Grenville	Thomas Grenville	Chief Justice in Eyre South of Trent
28 July 1800	Grampound	u*	Bryan Edwards	Sir Christopher Hawkins	Death
2 August 1800	Staffordshire	u*	Lord Granville Leveson Gower	Lord Granville Leveson Gower	Junior Lord of the Treasury
7 August 1800	Taunton	u*	Sir Benjamin Hammet	John Hammet	Death
4 November 1800	Hereford	u*	James Walwyn	Thomas Powell Symonds	Death
13 December 1800	Wendover	u	John Hiley Addington	John Hiley Addington	Junior Lord of the Treasury
17 December 1800	Leicester	c*	The Lord Rancliffe	Thomas Babington	Death
23 December 1800	Liskeard	u	The Earl of Inchiquin	Lord Fincastle	Resignation
23 December 1800	Peeblesshire	u*	William Montgomery	James Montgomery	Death
27 December 1800	Midhurst	u*	The Lord Glenbervie	George Smith	Resignation (Governor of the Cape Colony)
29 December 1800	Cockermouth	u	Edward Burrow	Walter Spencer Stanhope	Death
