= List of MPs elected in the 1796 British general election =

1796–1801 Parliament of the Great Britain
←	1790–1796 Parliament	1801–1802 Parliament	→
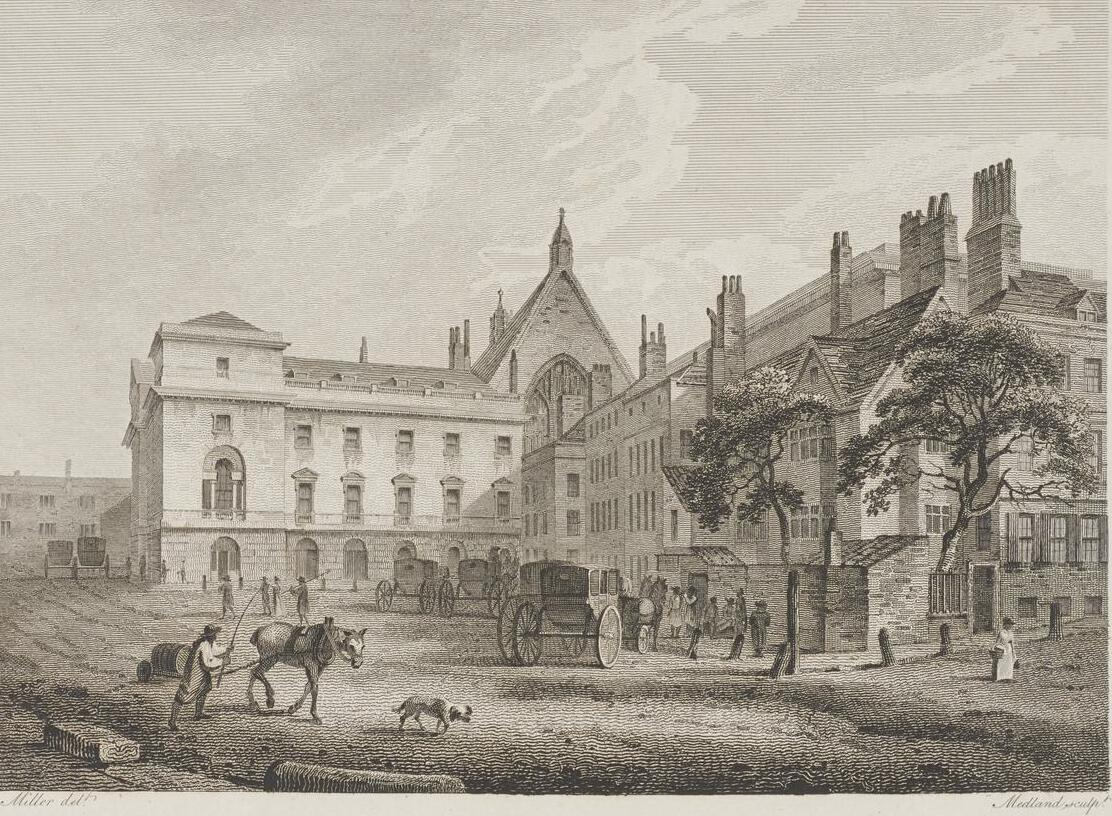
- The Palace of Westminster in 1796

Overview
- Legislative body: Parliament of Great Britain
- Jurisdiction: Great Britain
- Meeting place: Palace of Westminster
- Term: 6 October 1796 – 31 December 1800
- Government: First Pitt ministry

House of Commons
- Members: 558
- Speaker: Henry Addington
- Leader: William Pitt the Younger
- Prime Minister: William Pitt the Younger
- Leader of the Opposition: Charles James Fox

House of Lords
- Lord Chancellor: 1st Earl of Rosslyn
- Leader: 1st Baron Grenville

Crown-in-Parliament George III

Sessions
- 1st: 6 October 1796 – 20 July 1797
- 2nd: 2 November 1797 – 29 June 1798
- 3rd: 20 November 1798 – 12 July 1799
- 4th: 24 September 1799 – 29 July 1800
- 5th: 11 November 1800 – 31 December 1800

MPs elected in the 1796 British general election

This is a list of the 558 MPs or members of Parliament elected to the 314 constituencies of the Parliament of Great Britain in 1796, the 18th and final Parliament of Great Britain prior to the Union with Ireland to form the United Kingdom.

The candidates returned in contested elections are listed in the descending order of the number of votes received.

Table of contents:

A B C D E F G H I J K L M N O P Q R S T U V W X Y Z By-elections Changes

== A ==
Aberdeen Burghs (seat 1/1)	Alexander Allardyce	
Aberdeenshire (seat 1/1)	James Ferguson	Tory
Abingdon (seat 1/1)	Thomas Metcalfe	Tory
Aldborough (seat 1/2)	Trench Chiswell	Replaced by John Blackburn 1797
Aldborough (seat 2/2)	Charles Duncombe	
Aldeburgh (seat 1/2)	Sir John Aubrey, Bt.	Whig
Aldeburgh (seat 2/2)	Michael Angelo Taylor	Foxite Whig. Vacated seat and replaced by George Johnstone, May 1800
Amersham (seat 1/2)	Thomas Drake Tyrwhitt-Drake	Tory
Amersham (seat 2/2)	Charles Drake Garrard	Tory
Andover (seat 1/2)	Benjamin Lethieullier	Replaced by Thomas Assheton Smith I 1797
Andover (seat 2/2)	Coulson Wallop	
Anglesey (seat 1/1)	Sir Arthur Paget	Whig
Anstruther Easter Burghs (seat 1/1)	John Anstruther	Foxite Whig Replaced by Alexander Campbell 1797
Appleby (seat 1/2)	John Tufton	Died and replaced by Robert Adair, June 1799
Appleby (seat 2/2)	John Courtenay	
Argyllshire (seat 1/1)	Lord Frederick Campbell	Vacated seat and replaced by Lord John Campbell, Oct 1799
Arundel (seat 1/2)	Sir George Thomas, Bt.	Vacated seat. Replaced by Nisbet Balfour, July 1797
Arundel (seat 2/2)	James Greene	
Ashburton (seat 1/2)	Robert Mackreth	
Ashburton (seat 2/2)	Lawrence Palk	Chose to sit for Devon. Replaced by Walter Palk, Nov 1796
Aylesbury (seat 1/2)	Scrope Bernard	
Aylesbury (seat 2/2)	Gerard Lake, 1st Viscount Lake	
Ayr Burghs (seat 1/1)	John Campbell II	
Ayrshire (seat 1/1)	Hugh Montgomerie	Ennobled June 1796. Replaced by William Fullarton
== B ==
Banbury (seat 1/1)	Dudley Long North	
Banffshire (seat 1/1)	Sir William Grant	Whig
Barnstaple (seat 1/2)	John Clevland	
Barnstaple (seat 2/2)	Richard Wilson I	
Bath (seat 1/2)	Thomas Thynne	Ennobled Dec 1796. Replaced by Lord John Thynne
Bath (seat 2/2)	Sir Richard Pepper Arden	
Beaumaris (seat 1/1)	The Lord Newborough	
Bedford (seat 1/2)	Samuel Whitbread	
Bedford (seat 2/2)	William MacDowall Colhoun	
Bedfordshire (seat 1/2)	Hon. St Andrew St John	
Bedfordshire (seat 2/2)	John Osborn	
Bedwyn	See Great Bedwyn	
Bere Alston (seat 1/2)	John Mitford	Vacated seat, July 1799. Replaced by Lord Lovaine
Bere Alston (seat 2/2)	William Mitford	
Berkshire (seat 1/2)	George Vansittart	
Berkshire (seat 2/2)	Charles Dundas	
Berwickshire (seat 1/1)	George Baillie	
Berwick-upon-Tweed (seat 1/2)	The Earl of Tyrconnel	
Berwick-upon-Tweed (seat 2/2)	John Callender	
Beverley (seat 1/2)	William Tatton	Died and replaced by John Bacon Sawrey Morritt, Mar 1799
Beverley (seat 2/2)	Napier Christie Burton	
Bewdley (seat 1/1)	Miles Peter Andrews	
Bishops Castle (seat 1/2)	William Clive	
Bishops Castle (seat 2/2)	Henry Strachey	
Bletchingley (seat 1/2)	Sir Lionel Copley, Bt	Sat for Tregony and replaced by Benjamin Hobhouse, Feb 1797
Bletchingley (seat 2/2)	John Stein	
Bodmin (seat 1/2)	Sir John Morshead, Bt	
Bodmin (seat 2/2)	John Nesbitt	
Boroughbridge (seat 1/2)	Sir John Scott	Ennobled, Aug 1799. Replaced by Hon. John Scott
Boroughbridge (seat 2/2)	Francis Burdett	
Bossiney (seat 1/2)	John Stuart-Wortley	Died Jan 1797. Replaced by Hon. James Stuart-Wortley
Bossiney (seat 2/2)	John Lubbock	
Boston (seat 1/2)	Thomas Fydell I	
Boston (seat 2/2)	Viscount Milsington	
Brackley (seat 1/2)	John William Egerton	
Brackley (seat 2/2)	Samuel Haynes	
Bramber (seat 1/2)	Charles Rouse-Boughton	Appointed to Crown office. Replaced by John Henry Newbolt, Feb 1800
Bramber (seat 2/2)	James Adams	
Brecon (seat 1/1)	Sir Charles Gould Morgan	Chose to sit for Monmouthshire. Replaced by Sir Robert Salusbury, Bt, Nov 1796
Breconshire (seat 1/1)	Sir Charles Morgan, Bt	Previously known as Charles Gould.
Bridgnorth (seat 1/2)	John Whitmore	
Bridgnorth (seat 2/2)	Isaac Hawkins Browne	
Bridgwater (seat 1/2)	George Pocock	
Bridgwater (seat 2/2)	Jeffreys Allen	
Bridport (seat 1/2)	George Barclay	
Bridport (seat 2/2)	Charles Sturt	
Bristol (seat 1/2)	The Lord Sheffield	
Bristol (seat 2/2)	Charles Bragge	Later known as Charles Bathurst.
Buckingham (seat 1/2)	Thomas Grenville	
Buckingham (seat 2/2)	George Nugent	
Buckinghamshire (seat 1/2)	James Grenville	Vacated seat and replaced Jun 1797 by Richard Temple Nugent Grenville, Earl Temple
Buckinghamshire (seat 2/2)	Marquess of Titchfield	
Bury St Edmunds (seat 1/2)	Sir Charles Davers, Bt	
Bury St Edmunds (seat 2/2)	Lord Hervey	
Buteshire (seat 1/1)	Frederick Stuart	
== C ==
Caernarvon Boroughs (seat 1/1)	Hon. Edward Paget	
Caernarvonshire (seat 1/1)	Robert Williams	
Caithness (seat 0/0)	Alternated with Buteshire. No representation in 1796	
Callington (seat 1/2)	Sir John Call, Bt.	
Callington (seat 2/2)	Paul Orchard	
Calne (seat 1/2)	Joseph Jekyll	
Calne (seat 2/2)	Francis Baring, Bt.	Whig
Cambridge (seat 1/2)	Edward Finch	Tory
Cambridge (seat 2/2)	Robert Manners	Tory
Cambridgeshire (seat 1/2)	James Whorwood Adeane	
Cambridgeshire (seat 2/2)	Charles Philip Yorke	Tory
Cambridge University (seat 1/2)	William Pitt	Pittite Tory (Regarded self as Whig)
Cambridge University (seat 2/2)	Earl of Euston	Whig
Camelford (seat 1/2)	William Joseph Denison	
Camelford (seat 2/2)	John Angerstein	
Canterbury (seat 1/2)	John Baker	Replaced on petition by Sir John Honywood, Bt, May 1797
Canterbury (seat 2/2)	Samuel Elias Sawbridge	Replaced on petition by George Gipps. Gipps died and replaced by George Watson, Feb 1800
Cardiff Boroughs (seat 1/1)	Lord Evelyn Stuart	Tory
Cardigan Boroughs (seat 1/1)	Hon. John Vaughan	
Cardiganshire (seat 1/1)	Thomas Johnes	
Carlisle (seat 1/2)	John Christian Curwen	
Carlisle (seat 2/2)	Sir Frederick Fletcher-Vane, Bt	
Carmarthen (seat 1/1)	Magens Dorrien Magens	
Carmarthenshire (seat 1/1)	James Hamlyn	
Castle Rising (seat 1/2)	Charles Bagot-Chester	
Castle Rising (seat 2/2)	Horatio Churchill	
Cheshire (seat 1/2)	John Crewe	
Cheshire (seat 2/2)	Thomas Cholmondeley	
Chester (seat 1/2)	Viscount Belgrave	
Chester (seat 2/2)	Thomas Grosvenor	
Chichester (seat 1/2)	Thomas Steele	
Chichester (seat 2/2)	George White-Thomas	
Chippenham (seat 1/2)	George Fludyer	
Chippenham (seat 2/2)	James Dawkins	
Chipping Wycombe (seat 1/2)	Earl Wycombe	
Chipping Wycombe (seat 2/2)	Sir John Dashwood-King, Bt	
Christchurch (seat 1/2)	George Rose	
Christchurch (seat 2/2)	William Stewart Rose	Vacated seat. Replaced by William Chamberlayne, 1800
Cirencester (seat 1/2)	Sir Robert Preston, Bt	
Cirencester (seat 2/2)	Michael Hicks-Beach	
Clackmannanshire (seat 1/1)	Sir Ralph Abercromby	Vacated seat. Replaced by Sir Robert Abercromby, Feb 1798
Clitheroe (seat 1/2)	Lord Edward Bentinck	
Clitheroe (seat 2/2)	Hon. Robert Curzon	
Cockermouth (seat 1/2)	John Baynes Garforth	
Cockermouth (seat 2/2)	Edward Burrow	
Colchester (seat 1/2)	Robert Thornton	
Colchester (seat 2/2)	The Lord Muncaster	
Corfe Castle (seat 1/2)	Henry Bankes	
Corfe Castle (seat 2/2)	John Bond	
Cornwall (seat 1/2)	Sir William Lemon, Bt	
Cornwall (seat 2/2)	Francis Gregor	
Coventry (seat 1/2)	William Wilberforce Bird	
Coventry (seat 2/2)	Nathaniel Jefferys	
Cricklade (seat 1/2)	Thomas Estcourt	
Cricklade (seat 2/2)	Lord Portchester	
Cromartyshire (seat 1/1)	Duncan Davidson	
Cumberland (seat 1/2)	Sir Henry Fletcher, Bt	
Cumberland (seat 2/2)	John Lowther	
== D ==
Dartmouth (seat 1/2)	John Charles Villiers	
Dartmouth (seat 2/2)	Edmund Bastard	
Denbigh Boroughs (seat 1/1)	Richard Myddelton	Died 1796 and replaced 1797 by Thomas Tyrwhitt Jones
Denbighshire (seat 1/1)	Sir Watkin Williams-Wynn, 5th Baronet	
Derby (seat 1/2)	George Cavendish, 1st Earl of Burlington	Vacated seat in 1897 and replaced by George Walpole
Derby (seat 2/2)	Edward Coke	
Derbyshire (seat 1/2)	Lord John Cavendish	Died 1796 and replaced 1797 by George Cavendish
Derbyshire (seat 2/2)	Edward Miller Mundy	
Devizes (seat 1/2)	Henry Addington	
Devizes (seat 2/2)	Joshua Smith	
Devon (seat 1/2)	John Pollexfen Bastard	
Devon (seat 2/2)	Sir Lawrence Palk, Bt	
Dorchester (seat 1/2)	Hon. Cropley Ashley-Cooper	
Dorchester (seat 2/2)	Francis Fane	
Dorset (seat 1/2)	William Morton Pitt	
Dorset (seat 2/2)	Francis John Browne	
Dover (seat 1/2)	Charles Small Pybus	
Dover (seat 2/2)	John Trevanion	
Downton (seat 1/2)	Hon. Edward Bouverie	
Downton (seat 2/2)	Sir William Scott	
Droitwich (seat 1/2)	Andrew Foley	
Droitwich (seat 2/2)	Sir Edward Winnington, Bt	
Dumfries Burghs (seat 1/1)	Alexander Hope	Vacated seat and replaced by William Johnstone Hope, May 1800
Dumfriesshire (seat 1/1)	Sir Robert Laurie, Bt	
Dunbartonshire (seat 1/1)	William Cunninghame Bontine	Vacated seat and replaced by Alexander Telfer Smollett, May 1797. Smollett died and replaced by Sir James Colquhoun, 3rd Bt, Nov 1799
Dunwich (seat 1/2)	The Lord Huntingfield	
Dunwich (seat 2/2)	Snowdon Barne	
Durham (City of) (seat 1/2)	William Henry Lambton	Died 1797 and replaced 1798 by Ralph John Lambton
Durham (City of) (seat 2/2)	Sir Henry Vane-Tempest, Bt	
Durham (County) (seat 1/2)	Ralphe Milbanke	
Durham (County) (seat 2/2)	Rowland Burdon	
Dysart Burghs (seat 1/1)	Sir James St Clair-Erskine	
== E ==
East Grinstead (seat 1/2)	Nathaniel Dance-Holland	
East Grinstead (seat 2/2)	James Strange	
East Looe (seat 1/2)	John Buller	
East Looe (seat 2/2)	William Graves	Replaced by Frederick William Buller 1798
East Retford (seat 1/2)	William Petrie	
East Retford (seat 2/2)	Sir Wharton Amcotts, Bt	
Edinburgh (seat 1/1)	Henry Dundas	Tory
Edinburghshire (seat 1/1)	Robert Dundas	Tory. Appointed to Crown office and replaced 1801 by Robert Saunders Dundas
Elgin Burghs (seat 1/1)	Alexander Brodie	
Elginshire (seat 1/1)	James Brodie	
Essex (seat 1/2)	Thomas Berney Bramston	
Essex (seat 2/2)	Colonel John Bullock	Whig
Evesham (seat 1/2)	Charles Thellusson	
Evesham (seat 2/2)	Thomas Thompson	
Exeter (seat 1/2)	John Baring	Independent
Exeter (seat 2/2)	Sir Charles Warwick Bampfylde	Whig
Eye (seat 1/2)	Hon. William Cornwallis	
Eye (seat 2/2)	Mark Singleton	Vacated seat and replaced 1799 by James Cornwallis
== F ==
Fife (seat 1/1)	Sir William Erskine, Bt.	
Flint Boroughs (seat 1/1)	Watkin Williams	
Flintshire (seat 1/1)	Sir Roger Mostyn, Bt	Died and replaced Nov 1796 by Sir Thomas Mostyn, Bt, who in turn was replaced on petition Jun 1797 by John Lloyd
Forfarshire (seat 1/1)	Sir David Carnegie, Bt.	
Fowey (seat 1/2)	Philip Rashleigh	
Fowey (seat 2/2)	Reginald Pole Carew	Appointed to Crown office and replaced Jun 1799 by Edwartd Golding
== G ==
Gatton (seat 1/2)	John Petrie	Vacated seat and replaced by James Du Pre, Apr 1800
Gatton (seat 2/2)	Sir Gilbert Heathcote, Bt	Sat for Lincolnshire and replaced Nov 1796 by John Heathcote who vacated seat and was in turn replaced Apr 1799 by Walter Stirling
Glamorganshire (seat 1/1)	Thomas Wyndham	
Glasgow Burghs (seat 1/1)	William McDowall	
Gloucester (seat 1/2)	John Webb	Whig
Gloucester (seat 2/2)	John Pitt	Tory
Gloucestershire (seat 1/2)	Hon. George Cranfield Berkeley	Whig
Gloucestershire (seat 2/2)	Marquess of Worcester	Tory
Grampound (seat 1/2)	Bryan Edwards	Died and replaced July 1800 by Sir Christopher Hawkins, Bt
Grampound (seat 2/2)	Robert Sewell	
Grantham (seat 1/2)	Simon Yorke	
Grantham (seat 2/2)	George Manners-Sutton	
Great Bedwyn (seat 1/2)	Thomas Bruce	Died 1797 and replaced Dec 1797 by Robert John Buxton
Great Bedwyn (seat 2/2)	Hon. John Wodehouse	
Great Grimsby (seat 1/2)	Ayscoghe Boucherett	
Great Grimsby (seat 2/2)	William Mellish	
Great Marlow (seat 1/2)	Thomas Williams	
Great Marlow (seat 2/2)	Owen Williams	
Great Yarmouth (seat 1/2)	Lord Charles Townsend	Killed 1796 and replaced Oct 1796 by William Loftus
Great Yarmouth (seat 2/2)	Stephens Howe	Died and replaced Oct 1796 by Henry Jodrell
Guildford (seat 1/2)	Viscount Cranley	Whig
Guildford (seat 2/2)	Chapple Norton	
== H ==
Haddington Burghs (seat 1/1)	Robert Baird	Vacated seat and replaced Mar 1802 by Hon. Thomas Maitland
Haddingtonshire (seat 1/1)	Hew Dalrymple-Hamilton	Vacated seat and replaced May 1800 by Charles Hope
Hampshire (seat 1/2)	Sir William Heathcote, Bt	
Hampshire (seat 2/2)	William John Chute	
Harwich (seat 1/2)	John Robinson	
Harwich (seat 2/2)	Richard Hopkins	Died and replaced April 1799 by Hon Henry AugustusDillon
Haslemere (seat 1/2)	James Lowther	Sat for Westmorland and replaced Nov 1796 by George Wood
Haslemere (seat 2/2)	James Clarke Satterthwaite	
Hastings (seat 1/2)	Sir James Sanderson, Bt	Died and replaced July 1798 by William Sturges
Hastings (seat 2/2)	Nicholas Vansittart	
Haverfordwest (seat 1/1)	William Edwardes, Baron Kensington	
Hedon (seat 1/2)	Christopher Atkinson	
Hedon (seat 2/2)	Sir Lionel Darell, Bt	
Helston (seat 1/2)	Charles Abbot	Tory
Helston (seat 2/2)	Richard Richards	Vacated seat and replaced by Lord Francis Osborne
Hereford (seat 1/2)	James Walwyn	Died and replaced by Thomas Powell Symonds, Nov 1800
Hereford (seat 2/2)	John Scudamore	Died and replaced Oct 1796 by John Scudamore jnr
Herefordshire (seat 1/2)	Hon Thomas Harley	Tory
Herefordshire (seat 2/2)	Robert Biddulph	
Hertford (seat 1/2)	Nathaniel, Baron Dimsdale	
Hertford (seat 2/2)	John Calvert	
Hertfordshire (seat 1/2)	William Plumer	
Hertfordshire (seat 2/2)	William Baker	
Heytesbury (seat 1/2)	The Viscount Clifden	
Heytesbury (seat 2/2)	Sir John Leicester, Bt	
Higham Ferrers (seat 1/1)	James Adair	Died and replaced Sep 1798 by Stephen Thurston Adey who also died and was replaced in turn Nov 1801 by Francis Ferrand Foljambe
Hindon (seat 1/2)	Matthew Lewis	
Hindon (seat 2/2)	James Wildman	
Honiton (seat 1/2)	George Chambers	
Honiton (seat 2/2)	George Shum	
Horsham (seat 1/2)	Sir John Macpherson, Bt	
Horsham (seat 2/2)	James Fox-Lane	
Huntingdon (seat 1/2)	William Henry Fellowes	
Huntingdon (seat 2/2)	John Calvert	
Huntingdonshire (seat 1/2)	Lord Frederick Montagu	
Huntingdonshire (seat 2/2)	Viscount Hinchingbrooke	
Hythe (seat 1/2)	Sir Charles Farnaby-Radcliffe, Bt	Died and replaced by Hon Charles Marsham, Nov 1798
Hythe (seat 2/2)	William Evelyn	
== I ==
Ilchester (seat 1/2)	Sir Robert Clayton, Bt	Died and replaced May 1799 by Lewis Bayly
Ilchester (seat 2/2)	William Dickinson	
Inverness Burghs (seat 1/1)	Sir Hector Munro	
Inverness-shire (seat 1/1)	John Simon Frederick Fraser	
Ipswich (seat 1/2)	Sir Andrew Hamond, Bt	
Ipswich (seat 2/2)	Charles Alexander Crickitt	
== K ==
Kent (seat 1/2)	Sir Edward Knatchbull, Bt	
Kent (seat 2/2)	Sir William Geary, Bt	
Kincardineshire (seat 1/1)	Robert Barclay Allardice	Died and replaced June 1797 by Sir John Wishart-Belsches, Bt
King's Lynn (seat 1/2)	Hon. Horatio Walpole	
King's Lynn (seat 2/2)	Sir Martin ffolkes, Bt	
Kingston upon Hull (seat 1/2)	Sir Charles Turner, Bt	
Kingston upon Hull (seat 2/2)	Samuel Thornton	
Kinross-shire (seat 0/1)	Alternated with Clackmannanshire. Unrepresented in this Parliament	
Kirkcudbright Stewartry (seat 1/1)	Patrick Heron	Whig
Knaresborough (seat 1/2)	Lord John Townshend	Whig
Knaresborough (seat 2/2)	James Hare	Whig
== L ==
Lanarkshire (seat 1/1)	Sir James Denham-Steuart, Bt	Tory
Lancashire (seat 1/2)	Thomas Stanley	
Lancashire (seat 2/2)	John Blackburne	
Lancaster (seat 1/2)	John Dent	
Lancaster (seat 2/2)	Richard Penn	
Launceston (seat 1/2)	Hon. John Theophilus Rawdon	
Launceston (seat 2/2)	James Brogden	
Leicester (seat 1/2)	Samuel Smith	
Leicester (seat 2/2)	Thomas Boothby Parkins	Died and replaced Dec 1800 by Thomas Babington
Leicestershire (seat 1/2)	Penn Assheton Curzon	Died and replaced Oct 1797 by George Anthony Legh Keck
Leicestershire (seat 2/2)	William Pochin	Died and replaced Nov 1798 by Sir Edmund Cradock-Hartopp, Bt
Leominster (seat 1/2)	John Hunter	Vacated seat and replaced June 1797 by William Taylor
Leominster (seat 2/2)	George Augustus Pollen	
Lewes (seat 1/2)	Thomas Kemp	
Lewes (seat 2/2)	Hon John Cressett-Pelham	
Lichfield (seat 1/2)	Lord Granville Leveson-Gower	Vacated seat and replaced Mar 1799 by Sir John Wrottesley, Bt
Lichfield (seat 2/2)	Thomas Anson	
Lincoln (seat 1/2)	George Rawdon	Died and replaced Apr 1800 by Humphrey Sibthorp
Lincoln (seat 2/2)	Richard Ellison	
Lincolnshire (seat 1/2)	Sir Gilbert Heathcote, Bt	
Lincolnshire (seat 2/2)	Robert Vyner	
Linlithgow Burghs (seat 1/1)	Viscount Stopford	
Linlithgowshire (seat 1/1)	Hon. John Hope	Vacated seat and replaced May 1800 by Hon. Alexander Hope
Liskeard (seat 1/2)	Hon. Edward James Eliot	Died and replaced Nov 1797 by Murrough O'Brien. O'Brien vacated seat and replaced by George Murray, Dec 1800
Liskeard (seat 2/2)	Hon. Hon. John Eliot	
Liverpool (seat 1/2)	Isaac Gascoyne	Tory/Ultra-Tory
Liverpool (seat 2/2)	Banastre Tarleton	Tory
London (City of) (seat 1/4)	William Lushington	
London (City of) (seat 2/4)	William Curtis	Tory
London (City of) (seat 3/4)	Harvey Christian Combe	
London (City of) (seat 4/4)	Sir John William Anderson, Bt	
Lostwithiel (seat 1/2)	Hans Sloane	
Lostwithiel (seat 2/2)	William Drummond	
Ludgershall (seat 1/2)	Earl of Dalkieth	
Ludgershall (seat 2/2)	Thomas Everett	
Ludlow (seat 1/2)	Robert Clive	
Ludlow (seat 2/2)	Richard Payne Knight	
Lyme Regis (seat 1/2)	Hon. Henry Fane	
Lyme Regis (seat 2/2)	Thomas Fane	
Lymington (seat 1/2)	(Sir) Harry Burrard (later Burrard-Neale)	
Lymington (seat 2/2)	William Manning	
== M ==
Maidstone (seat 1/2)	Matthew Bloxham	
Maidstone (seat 2/2)	Oliver De Lancey	
Maldon (seat 1/2)	Joseph Holden Strutt	
Maldon (seat 2/2)	Charles Callis Western	
Malmesbury (seat 1/2)	Samuel Smith	Sat for Leicester and replaced Nov 1797 by Philip Metcalfe
Malmesbury (seat 2/2)	Peter Thellusson	
Malton (seat 1/2)	William Baldwin	Replaced by Charles Lawrence Dundas 1798
Malton (seat 2/2)	George Damer	Ennobled and replaced Feb 1798 by Bryan Cooke
Marlborough (seat 1/2)	Charles Bruce, Lord Bruce	
Marlborough (seat 2/2)	Hon. James Bruce	Vacated seat and replaced by Robert Brudenell
Merionethshire (seat 1/1)	Sir Robert Williames Vaughan	
Middlesex (seat 1/2)	William Mainwaring	Tory
Middlesex (seat 2/2)	George Byng	Whig
Midhurst (seat 1/2)	Sylvester Douglas	Ennobled and replaced Dec 1800 by George Smith
Midhurst (seat 2/2)	Charles Long	
Milborne Port (seat 1/2)	Henry Paget, Lord Paget	
Milborne Port (seat 2/2)	Sir Robert Ainslie, Bt	
Minehead (seat 1/2)	John Fownes Luttrell	Tory
Minehead (seat 2/2)	John Langston (MP)	Tory
Mitchell (seat 1/2)	Sir Stephen Lushington, Bt	
Mitchell (seat 2/2)	Sir Christopher Hawkins, Bt	Vacated seat and replaced Apr 1799 by John Simpson
Monmouth Boroughs (seat 1/1)	Sir Charles Thompson, Bt	Died and replaced by Lord Edward Somerset, Mar 1799
Monmouthshire (seat 1/2)	James Rooke	
Monmouthshire (seat 2/2)	Charles Morgan (formerly Gould)	
Montgomery (seat 1/1)	Whitshed Keene	
Montgomeryshire (seat 1/1)	Francis Lloyd	Replaced by Charles Williams-Wynn 1799
Morpeth (seat 1/2)	Viscount Morpeth	
Morpeth (seat 2/2)	William Huskisson	
== N ==
Nairnshire (seat 0/0)	Henry Frederick Campbell	
Newark (seat 1/2)	Thomas Manners-Sutton	
Newark (seat 2/2)	Mark Wood	
Newcastle-under-Lyme (seat 1/2)	William Egerton	
Newcastle-under-Lyme (seat 2/2)	Edward Bootle-Wilbraham	
Newcastle-upon-Tyne (seat 1/2)	Charles Brandling	Vacated seat and replaced Jan 1798 by Charles John Brandling
Newcastle-upon-Tyne (seat 2/2)	Sir Matthew White Ridley, 2nd Baronet	
Newport (Cornwall) (seat 1/2)	William Northey	
Newport (Cornwall) (seat 2/2)	Joseph Richardson	
Newport (Isle of Wight) (seat 1/2)	Jervoise Clarke Jervoise	Chose to sit for Yarmouth, IoW and replaced Nov 1796 by William Hamilton Nisbet
Newport (Isle of Wight) (seat 2/2)	Edward Rushworth	Chose to sit for Yarmouth, IoW and replaced by Andrew Strahan
New Radnor Boroughs (seat 1/1)	George Capel-Coningsby, Viscount Malden	Ennobled and replaced Mar 1799 by Richard Price
New Romney (seat 1/2)	John Fordyce	
New Romney (seat 2/2)	John Willett Willett	
New Shoreham (seat 1/2)	Hon. Charles William Wyndham	
New Shoreham (seat 2/2)	Sir Cecil Bisshopp, Bt	
Newton (Lancashire) (seat 1/2)	Thomas Peter Legh	
Newton (Lancashire) (seat 2/2)	Thomas Brooke	Died and replaced Sep 1797 by Thomas Langford Brooke. Brooke replaced Sep 1797 on petition by Peter Patten
Newtown (Isle of Wight) (seat 1/2)	Sir Richard Worsley, Bt	Vacated seat and replaced Feb 1801 by Sir Edward Law
Newtown (Isle of Wight) (seat 2/2)	Charles Shaw-Lefevre	
New Windsor (seat 1/2)	Hon. Robert Fulke Greville	Tory
New Windsor (seat 2/2)	Henry Isherwood	Died and replaced Feb 1797 by Sir William Johnston, Bt
New Woodstock (seat 1/2)	Ralph Payne, Baron Lavington	Appointed to Crown office and replaced Jan 1799 by Charles Moore
New Woodstock (seat 2/2)	Sir Henry Dashwood, Bt	
Norfolk (seat 1/2)	Thomas Coke |	
Norfolk (seat 2/2)	Sir John Wodehouse, Bt	Replaced by Jacob Astley 1797
Northallerton (seat 1/2)	Henry Peirse (younger)	
Northallerton (seat 2/2)	Hon. Edward Lascelles	
Northampton (seat 1/2)	Hon. Spencer Perceval	
Northampton (seat 2/2)	Hon. Edward Bouverie	
Northamptonshire (seat 1/2)	Thomas Powys	Vacated seat and replaced by William Ralph Cartwright, Aug 1797
Northamptonshire (seat 2/2)	Francis Dickins	
Northumberland (seat 1/2)	Charles Grey	
Northumberland (seat 2/2)	Thomas Richard Beaumont	
Norwich (seat 1/2)	Hon. Henry Hobart	Died and replaced May 1799 by John Frere
Norwich (seat 2/2)	William Windham	
Nottingham (seat 1/2)	Robert Smith	Ennobled and replaced Nov 1797 by Sir John Borlase Warren, Bt
Nottingham (seat 2/2)	Daniel Parker Coke	
Nottinghamshire (seat 1/2)	Lord William Bentinck	
Nottinghamshire (seat 2/2)	Hon. Evelyn Pierrepont	
== O ==
Okehampton (seat 1/2)	Thomas Tyrwhitt	Whig
Okehampton (seat 2/2)	Richard Bateman-Robson	Whig
Old Sarum (seat 1/2)	Richard Wellesley, Earl of Mornington	Vacated seat and replaced July 1797 by Charles Williams-Wynn
Old Sarum (seat 2/2)	George Hardinge	
Orford (seat 1/2)	Lord Robert Seymour	
Orford (seat 2/2)	Robert Stewart, Viscount Castlereagh	
Orkney and Shetland (seat 1/1)	Robert Honyman	
Oxford (seat 1/2)	Francis Burton	
Oxford (seat 2/2)	Henry Peters	
Oxfordshire (seat 1/2)	Lord Charles Spencer	Appointed to Crown Office and replaced by Lord Francis Spencer
Oxfordshire (seat 2/2)	John Fane (1751–1824)	
Oxford University (seat 1/2)	Sir William Dolben, Bt	
Oxford University (seat 2/2)	Francis Page	Vacated seat and replaced Mar 1801 by Sir William Scott
== P ==
Peeblesshire (seat 1/1)	William Montgomery	Died and replaced by James Montgomery, Dec 1800
Pembroke Boroughs (seat 1/1)	Hugh Barlow	Whig
Pembrokeshire (seat 1/1)	Richard Philipps, 1st Baron Milford	
Penryn (seat 1/2)	Thomas Wallace	Tory
Penryn (seat 2/2)	William Meeke	
Perth Burghs (seat 1/1)	David Scott	
Perthshire (seat 1/1)	Thomas Graham	
Peterborough (seat 1/2)	Hon. Lionel Damer	
Peterborough (seat 2/2)	Richard Benyon	Benyon died and was replaced Oct 1796 by French Laurence
Petersfield (seat 1/2)	William Jolliffe	
Petersfield (seat 2/2)	Hylton Jolliffe	Vacated seat and was replaced Jam 1797 by Sir John Sinclair, 1st Baronet
Plymouth (seat 1/2)	Sir Frederick Rogers, Bt	Replaced by Francis Glanville 1797
Plymouth (seat 2/2)	William Elford	
Plympton Erle (seat 1/2)	William Adams	
Plympton Erle (seat 2/2)	William Mitchell	Vacated seat and replaced June 1799 by Richard Hankey
Pontefract (seat 1/2)	Robert Monckton-Arundell, 4th Viscount Galway	
Pontefract (seat 2/2)	John Smyth	
Poole (seat 1/2)	Hon. Charles Stuart	Died and replaced Apr 1801 by George Garland
Poole (seat 2/2)	John Jeffery	
Portsmouth (seat 1/2)	Hon. Thomas Erskine	
Portsmouth (seat 2/2)	Lord Hugh Seymour	Died and was replaced Nov 1801 by John Markham
Preston (seat 1/2)	Lord Stanley	
Preston (seat 2/2)	Sir Henry Hoghton, Bt	
== Q ==
Queenborough (seat 1/2)	John Sargent	
Queenborough (seat 2/2)	Evan Nepean	
== R ==
Radnorshire (seat 1/1)	Walter Wilkins	
Reading (seat 1/2)	Francis Annesley	
Reading (seat 2/2)	Richard Aldworth Neville	Ennobled and replaced in June 1797 by John Simeon
Reigate (seat 1/2)	Hon. John Somers Cocks	
Reigate (seat 2/2)	Joseph Sydney Yorke	
Renfrewshire (seat 1/1)	Boyd Alexander	
Richmond (Yorkshire) (seat 1/2)	Hon. Lawrence Dundas	
Richmond (Yorkshire) (seat 2/2)	Charles George Beauclerk Vacated seat and replaced Dec 1798 by Arthur Shakespeare	
Ripon (seat 1/2)	William Lawrence	Tory
Ripon (seat 2/2)	Sir George Allanson-Winn, Bt	Tory. Ennobled and replaced Apr 1798 by John Heathcote
Rochester (seat 1/2)	Sir Richard King, Bt	
Rochester (seat 2/2)	Hon. Henry Tufton	
Ross-shire (seat 1/1)	Sir Charles Lockhart-Ross, Bt.	
Roxburghshire (seat 1/1)	Sir George Douglas	
Rutland (seat 1/2)	Gerard Noel Edwardes	Whig
Rutland (seat 2/2)	Sir William Lowther, Bt	
Rye (seat 1/2)	Hon. Robert Banks Jenkinson	Tory
Rye (seat 2/2)	Robert Saunders Dundas	Tory
== S ==
St Albans (seat 1/2)	Hon. Richard Bingham	Tory. Vacated seat and replaced June 1800 by William Stephen Poyntz
St Albans (seat 2/2)	Thomas Skip Dyot Bucknall	Tory
St Germans (seat 1/2)	Hon. William Eliot	
St Germans (seat 2/2)	Lord Grey	
St Ives (seat 1/2)	William Praed	
St Ives (seat 2/2)	Sir Richard Glyn, Bt	
St Mawes (seat 1/2)	Sir William Young, Bt	Tory
St Mawes (seat 2/2)	Sir George Nugent, Bt	Chose to sit for Buckingham. Replaced Oct 1796 by Jeremiah Crutchley
Salisbury (seat 1/2)	Hon. William Henry Bouverie	
Salisbury (seat 2/2)	William Hussey	
Saltash (seat 1/2)	The Lord Macdonald	
Saltash (seat 2/2)	Edward Bearcroft	Died and replaced Dec 1796 by Charles Smith
Sandwich (seat 1/2)	Sir Philip Stephens, Bt	
Sandwich (seat 2/2)	Sir Horatio Mann, Bt	
Scarborough (seat 1/2)	Lord Charles Somerset	Tory
Scarborough (seat 2/2)	Hon. Edmund Phipps	Tory
Seaford (seat 1/2)	Charles Rose Ellis	Tory
Seaford (seat 2/2)	George Ellis	Tory
Selkirkshire (seat 1/1)	Mark Pringle	
Shaftesbury (seat 1/2)	Paul Benfield	
Shaftesbury (seat 2/2)	Walter Boyd	
Shrewsbury (seat 1/2)	Sir William Pulteney, Bt	Whig
Shrewsbury (seat 2/2)	Hon. William Hill	Tory
Shropshire (seat 1/2)	John Kynaston (later Powell)	
Shropshire (seat 2/2)	Sir Richard Hill, Bt	
Somerset (seat 1/2)	William Dickinson	
Somerset (seat 2/2)	William Gore-Langton	
Southampton (seat 1/2)	George Henry Rose	
Southampton (seat 2/2)	James Amyatt	
Southwark (seat 1/2)	Henry Thornton	Independent
Southwark (seat 2/2)	George Woodford Thellusson	Whig Replaced by George Tierney 1796
Stafford (seat 1/2)	Edward Monckton	Tory
Stafford (seat 2/2)	Richard Brinsley Sheridan	Whig
Staffordshire (seat 1/2)	Sir Edward Littleton, Bt	Whig
Staffordshire (seat 2/2)	Earl Gower	Whig Replaced by Lord Granville Leveson-Gower 1799
Stamford (seat 1/2)	Sir George Howard	Died and replaced Oct 1796 by John Leland
Stamford (seat 2/2)	John Proby, 1st Earl of Carysfort	
Steyning (seat 1/2)	John Henniker-Major	
Steyning (seat 2/2)	James Lloyd	
Stirling Burghs (seat 1/1)	Andrew Cochrane-Johnstone	Tory Replaced by William Tait 1797; Replaced by Alexander Forrester Inglis Cochrane 1800
Stirlingshire (seat 1/1)	Sir George Keith Elphinstone	
Stockbridge (seat 1/2)	Joseph Foster Barham	Whig. Vacated seat and replaced Apr 1799 by John Agnew
Stockbridge (seat 2/2)	George Porter	Whig
Sudbury (seat 1/2)	William Smith	
Sudbury (seat 2/2)	Sir James Marriott	
Suffolk (seat 1/2)	Sir Charles Bunbury, Bt	
Suffolk (seat 2/2)	Charles Cornwallis, Viscount Brome	
Surrey (seat 1/2)	Lord William Russell	Whig
Surrey (seat 2/2)	Sir John Frederick, Bt	Tory
Sussex (seat 1/2)	Hon. Thomas Pelham	Ennobled July 1801 and replaced by John Fuller
Sussex (seat 2/2)	Charles Lennox	
Sutherland (seat 1/1)	James Grant	
== T ==
Tain Burghs (seat 1/1)	William Dundas	Tory
Tamworth (seat 1/2)	Sir Robert Peel	Tory
Tamworth (seat 2/2)	Thomas Carter	
Taunton (seat 1/2)	Sir Benjamin Hammet	Died and replaced Aug 1800 by John Hammet
Taunton (seat 2/2)	William Morland	
Tavistock (seat 1/2)	Lord John Russell	
Tavistock (seat 2/2)	Hon. Richard FitzPatrick	
Tewkesbury (seat 1/2)	James Martin	
Tewkesbury (seat 2/2)	William Dowdeswell	Appointed to Crown office and replaced Dec 1797 by Christopher Bethell Codrington
Thetford (seat 1/2)	Joseph Randyll Burch	
Thetford (seat 2/2)	John Harrison	
Thirsk (seat 1/2)	Sir Thomas Frankland, Bt	
Thirsk (seat 2/2)	Sir Gregory Page-Turner, Bt	
Tiverton (seat 1/2)	Hon. Dudley Ryder	
Tiverton (seat 2/2)	Hon. Richard Ryder	
Totnes (seat 1/2)	Lord Arden	
Totnes (seat 2/2)	Lord George Seymour	Vacated seat and replaced Feb 1801 by William Adams
Tregony (seat 1/2)	Sir Lionel Copley, Bt	
Tregony (seat 2/2)	John Nicholls	
Truro (seat 1/2)	John Leveson-Gower	
Truro (seat 2/2)	John Lemon	
== W ==
Wallingford (seat 1/2)	Lord Eardley	Whig
Wallingford (seat 2/2)	Sir Francis Sykes, Bt Lord Eardley	Tory
Wareham (seat 1/2)	Sir Godfrey Vassall	Whig Replaced by John Calcraft 1800
Wareham (seat 2/2)	Lord Robert Spencer	Replaced by Joseph Chaplin Hankey 1799
Warwick (seat 1/2)	Hon. George Villiers	
Warwick (seat 2/2)	Samuel Robert Gaussen	
Warwickshire (seat 1/2)	Sir John Mordaunt, Bt	
Warwickshire (seat 2/2)	Sir George Augustus William Shuckburgh-Evelyn, Bt	
Wells (seat 1/2)	John Paine Tudway	
Wells (seat 2/2)	Charles William Taylor	
Wendover (seat 1/2)	John Hiley Addington	Tory
Wendover (seat 2/2)	George Canning	Tory
Wenlock (seat 1/2)	John Simpson	
Wenlock (seat 2/2)	Cecil Forester	
Weobley (seat 1/2)	Lord George Thynne	
Weobley (seat 2/2)	Lord John Thynne	Vacated seat and replaced Dec 1796 by Inigo Freeman Thomas. Thomas then vacated seat and was replaced Apr 1800 by Sir Charles Talbot, Bt.
Westbury (seat 1/2)	Sir Henry St John-Mildmay, Bt	
Westbury (seat 2/2)	George Ellis	Chose to sit for Seaford and replaced Apr 1800 by John Simon Harcourt
West Looe (seat 1/2)	John Buller	Vacated seat and replaced Nov 1796 by John Hookham Frere
West Looe (seat 2/2)	Sitwell Sitwell	
Westminster (seat 1/2)	Hon. Charles James Fox	Foxite Whig
Westminster (seat 2/2)	Sir Alan Gardner, Bt	Tory
Westmorland (seat 1/2)	Sir Michael le Fleming, Bt	Tory
Westmorland (seat 2/2)	James Lowther	Tory
Weymouth and Melcombe Regis (seat 1/4)	Sir James Pulteney, Bt (formerly Murray)	Tory
Weymouth and Melcombe Regis (seat 2/4)	Andrew Stuart	Died and replaced May 1801 by Charles Adams
Weymouth and Melcombe Regis (seat 3/4)	Gabriel Tucker Steward	Tory
Weymouth and Melcombe Regis (seat 4/4)	William Garthshore	Tory
Whitchurch (seat 1/2)	Hon. John Townshend	Ennobled and replaced Jul 1800 by Hon. William Augustus Townshend
Whitchurch (seat 2/2)	William Brodrick	
Wigan (seat 1/2)	Hon. Orlando Bridgeman	Ennobled and replaced Jun 1800 by George William Gunning
Wigan (seat 2/2)	John Cotes	
Wigtown Burghs (seat 1/1)	John Spalding	
Wigtownshire (seat 1/1)	Hon. William Stewart	
Wilton (seat 1/2)	Viscount FitzWilliam	
Wilton (seat 2/2)	Philip Goldsworthy	Died and replaced Feb 1801 by John Spencer
Wiltshire (seat 1/2)	Ambrose Goddard	
Wiltshire (seat 2/2)	Henry Penruddocke Wyndham	
Winchelsea (seat 1/2)	Richard Barwell	Vacated seat and replaced Dec 1796 by William Devaynes
Winchelsea (seat 2/2)	William Currie	
Winchester (seat 1/2)	Richard Grace Gamon	
Winchester (seat 2/2)	Henry Temple, 2nd Viscount Palmerston	
Wootton Bassett (seat 1/2)	John Denison	
Wootton Bassett (seat 2/2)	Edward Clarke	
Worcester (seat 1/2)	Edmund Wigley	
Worcester (seat 2/2)	Abraham Robarts	
Worcestershire (seat 1/2)	Edward Foley	
Worcestershire (seat 2/2)	William Lygon	
== Y ==
Yarmouth (Isle of Wight) (seat 1/2)	Jervoise Clarke Jervoise	Whig
Yarmouth (Isle of Wight) (seat 2/2)	Edward Rushworth	Independent. Vacated seat and replaced March 1797 by William Peachy
York (seat 1/2)	Sir William Mordaunt Milner, Bt.	Whig
York (seat 2/2)	Richard Slater Milnes	Tory
Yorkshire (seat 1/2)	William Wilberforce	Tory
Yorkshire (seat 2/2)	Hon. Henry Lascelles	Tory

== By-elections ==
- List of Great Britain by-elections (1790–1800)

== See also ==
- 1796 British general election
- List of parliaments of Great Britain
- Unreformed House of Commons
