= List of MPs elected in the 1790 British general election =

1790–1796 Parliament of the Great Britain
←	1784–1790 Parliament	1796–1801 Parliament	→
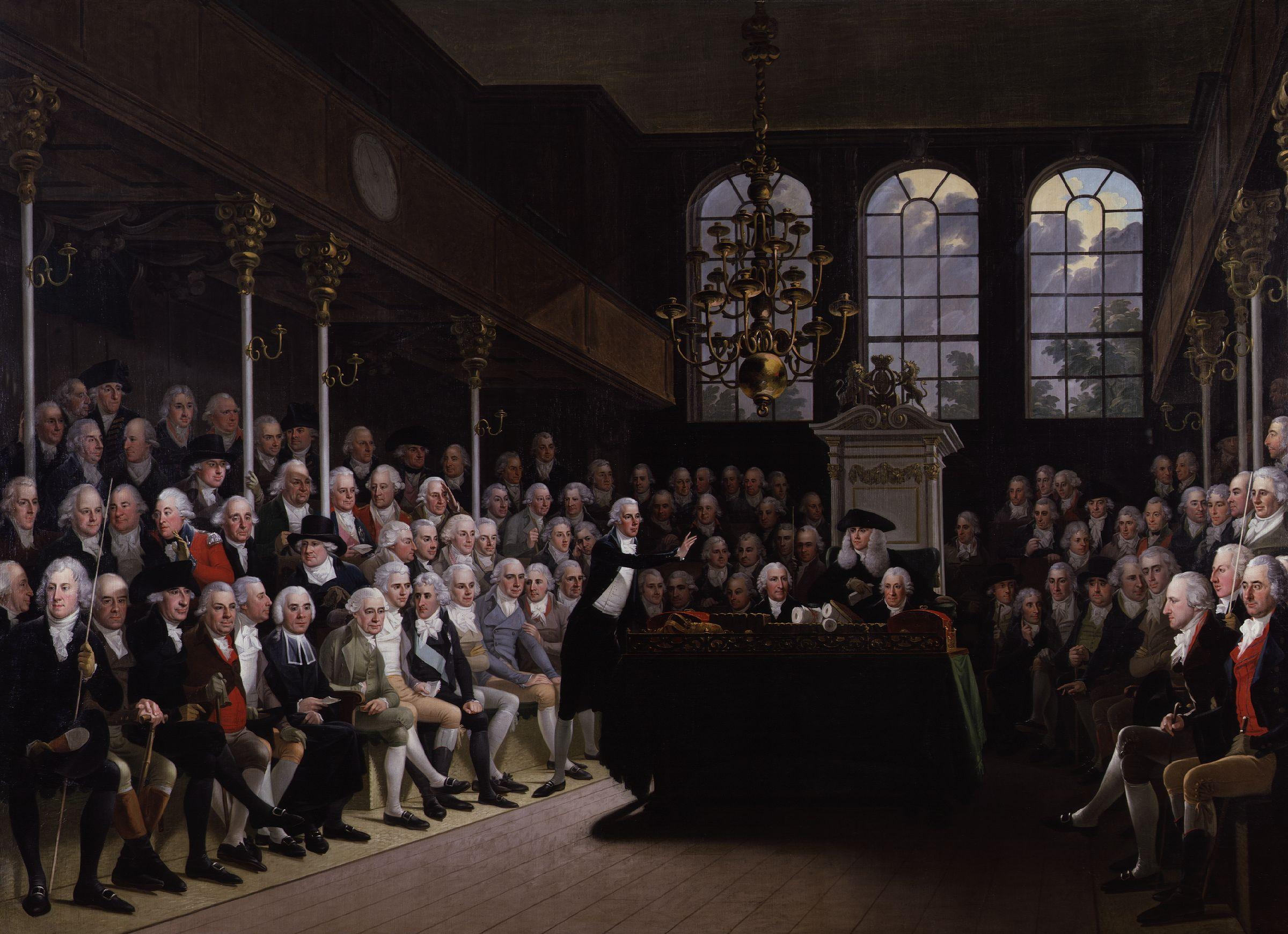
- The House of Commons, 1793–94 is a history painting that depicts this parliament.

Overview
- Legislative body: Parliament of Great Britain
- Jurisdiction: Great Britain
- Meeting place: Palace of Westminster
- Term: 25 November 1790 – 19 May 1796

House of Commons
- Speaker: Henry Addington

House of Lords
- Lord Chancellor: 1st Baron Thurlow (until 15 June 1792); In commission (15 June 1792 – 28 January 1793); 1st Earl of Rosslyn (from 28 January 1793)

Crown-in-Parliament George III

Sessions
- 1st: 25 November 1790 – 10 June 1791
- 2nd: 31 January 1792 – 15 June 1792
- 3rd: 13 December 1792 – 21 June 1793
- 4th: 21 January 1794 – 11 July 1794
- 5th: 30 December 1794 – 27 June 1795
- 6th: 29 October 1795 – 19 May 1796

List of MPs elected in the 1790 British general election

This is a list of the 558 MPs or members of Parliament elected to the 314 constituencies of the Parliament of Great Britain in 1790, the 17th Parliament of Great Britain and their replacements returned at subsequent by-elections, arranged by constituency.

Table of contents:

A B C D E F G H I J K L M N O P Q R S T U V W X Y Z By-elections Changes

== A ==
Aberdeen Burghs (seat 1/1)	Alexander Callender – died Replaced by Alexander Allardyce 1792	
Aberdeenshire (seat 1/1)	James Ferguson	
Abingdon (seat 1/1)	Edward Loveden Loveden	
Aldborough (seat 1/2)	Richard Trench Chiswell	
Aldborough (seat 2/2)	John Gally Knight	
Aldeburgh (seat 1/2)	Lord Grey of Groby	
Aldeburgh (seat 2/2)	Thomas Grenville	
Amersham (seat1/2)	William Drake Jr. – died Replaced by Thomas Drake Tyrwhitt 1795	Tory
Amersham (seat 2/2)	William Drake Sr.	Tory
Andover (seat 1/2)	Benjamin Lethieullier	
Andover (seat 2/2)	William Fellowes	
Anglesey (seat 1/1)	William Paget – died Replaced by Arthur Paget 1794	
Anstruther Easter Burghs (seat 1/1)	John Anstruther – resigned Replaced by Robert Anstruther 1793 – resigned Replaced by William Dundas 1794	
Appleby (seat 1/2)	Robert Banks Jenkinson – sat for Rye; Replaced by William Grimston 1791	
Appleby (seat 2/2)	Richard Ford – resigned Replaced by John Theophilus Rawdon 1791	
Argyllshire (seat 1/1)	Lord Frederick Campbell	
Arundel (seat 1/2)	Sir George Thomas, Bt	
Arundel (seat 2/2)	Henry Thomas Howard – resigned Replaced by Sir Thomas Gascoigne 1795	
Ashburton (seat 1/2)	Lawrence Palk	
Ashburton (seat 2/2)	Robert Mackreth	
Aylesbury (seat 1/2)	Scrope Bernard	
Aylesbury (seat 2/2)	Gerard Lake	
Ayr Burghs (seat 1/1)	Charles Stuart– resigned Replaced by John Campbell 1794	
Ayrshire (seat 1/1)	Sir Adam Fergusson	
== B ==
Banbury (seat 1/1)	Frederick North, Lord North – succeeded to peerage Replaced by Lord North 1790 – succeeded to peerage Replaced by Frederick North 1792 – took office Replaced by William Holbech 1794	Tory
Banffshire (seat 1/1)	Sir James Grant – took office Replaced by David McDowall Grant 1795	
Barnstaple (seat 1/2)	William Devaynes	
Barnstaple (seat 2/2)	John Clevland	Whig
Bath (seat 1/2)	Viscount Weymouth	
Bath (seat 2/2)	Hon. John Jeffreys Pratt – succeeded to peerage Replaced by Sir Richard Pepper Arden 1794	
Beaumaris (seat 1/1)	Sir Hugh Williams, 8th Baronet – died Sir Watkin Williams Wynn 1794	
Bedford (seat 1/2)	William MacDowall Colhoun	
Bedford (seat 2/2)	Samuel Whitbread	
Bedfordshire (seat 1/2)	John FitzPatrick, 2nd Earl of Upper Ossory – ennobled Replaced by John Osborn 1794	Whig
Bedfordshire (seat 2/2)	Hon. St Andrew St John	
Bere Alston (seat 1/2)	Sir George Beaumont	
Bere Alston (seat 2/2)	John Mitford	
Berkshire (seat 1/2)	George Vansittart	Tory
Berkshire (seat 2/2)	Winchcombe Henry Hartley – died Replaced by Charles Dundas 1794	
Berwickshire (seat 1/1)	Patrick Home	
Berwick-upon-Tweed (seat 1/2)	Hon. Charles Carpenter	
Berwick-upon-Tweed (seat 2/2)	Hon. John Vaughan – died Replaced by John Callender 1795	
Beverley (seat 1/2)	John Wharton	Whig
Beverley (seat 2/2)	Sir James Pennyman, Bt	
Bewdley (seat 1/1)	Hon. George Lyttelton	
Bishops Castle (seat 1/2)	William Clive	
Bishops Castle (seat 2/2)	Henry Strachey	
Bletchingley (seat 1/2)	Philip Francis	
Bletchingley (seat 2/2)	Sir Robert Clayton 1787	
Bodmin (seat 1/2)	Sir John Morshead	
Bodmin (seat 2/2)	Roger Wilbraham	
Boroughbridge (seat 1/2)	Sir Richard Sutton, Bt	
Boroughbridge (seat 2/2)	Morris Robinson	
Bossiney (seat 1/2)	Hon. James Archibald Stuart	
Bossiney (seat 2/2)	Humphrey Minchin – died Replaced by Evelyn Pierrepont 1796	
Boston (seat 1/2)	Sir Peter Burrell	
Boston (seat 2/2)	Thomas Fydell	
Brackley (seat 1/2)	John William Egerton	
Brackley (seat 2/2)	Samuel Haynes	
Bramber (seat 1/2)	Thomas Coxhead	
Bramber (seat 2/2)	Sir Henry Gough	
Brecon (seat 1/1)	Sir Charles Gould Morgan	
Breconshire (seat 1/1)	Sir Charles Gould	
Bridgnorth (seat 1/2)	Isaac Hawkins Browne	
Bridgnorth (seat 2/2)	Thomas Whitmore – died Replaced by John Whitmore 1795	
Bridgwater (seat 1/2)	Major the Hon. Vere Poulett	
Bridgwater (seat 2/2)	John Langston	
Bridport (seat 1/2)	James Watson – took office Replaced by George Barclay 1795	
Bridport (seat 2/2)	Charles Sturt	
Bristol (seat 1/2)	Marquess of Worcester	Tory
Bristol (seat 2/2)	The Lord Sheffield	Whig
Buckingham (seat 1/2)	George Nugent	
Buckingham (seat 2/2)	James Grenville – resigned Replaced by Sir Alexander Hood 1790	
Buckinghamshire (seat 1/2)	William Grenville – ennobled Replaced by James Grenville 1790	
Buckinghamshire (seat 2/2)	The Earl Verney – died Replaced by Marquess of Titchfield 1791	
Bury St Edmunds (seat 1/2)	Sir Charles Davers, Bt	
Bury St Edmunds (seat 2/2)	Lord Charles FitzRoy	
Buteshire (seat 0/0)	Alternating seat with Caithness. No representation in 1790	
== C ==
Caernarvon Boroughs (seat 1/1)	Lord Paget – accepted commission Replaced by Lord Paget 1795	
Caernarvonshire (seat 1/1)	Sir Robert Williams, 9th Baronet	
Caithness (seat 1/1)	Sir John Sinclair, Bt	Whig
Callington (seat 1/2)	Sir John Call	
Callington (seat 2/2)	Paul Orchard	
Calne (seat 1/2)	by Joseph Jekyll	
Calne (seat 2/2)	John Morris – resigned Replaced by Benjamin Vaughan 1792	
Cambridge (seat 1/2)	Edward Finch	
Cambridge (seat 2/2)	Francis Dickins – sat for Northamptonshire; Replaced by Robert Manners 1791	
Cambridgeshire (seat 1/2)	James Whorwood Adeane	
Cambridgeshire (seat 2/2)	Charles Philip Yorke	
Cambridge University (seat 1/2)	William Pitt the Younger	
Cambridge University (seat 2/2)	Earl of Euston	
Camelford (seat 1/2)	Sir Samuel Hannay, Bt – died Replaced by William Smith 1791	
Camelford (seat 2/2)	James Macpherson – died Replaced by Lord William Bentinck 1796	
Canterbury (seat 1/2)	George Gipps	
Canterbury (seat 2/2)	Sir John Honywood, Bt	
Cardiff Boroughs (seat 1/1)	Lord Mount Stuart– died Replaced by Evelyn James Stuart 1794	
Cardigan Boroughs (seat 1/1)	John Campbell	
Cardiganshire (seat 1/1)	Viscount Lisburne	
Carlisle (seat 1/2)	James Satterthwaite – unseated Replaced by Wilson Braddyll 1791	
Carlisle (seat 2/2)	Edward Knubley – unseated Replaced by John Christian Curwen 1791	
Carmarthen (seat 1/1)	John George Philipps	
Carmarthenshire (seat 1/1)	George Talbot Rice – succeeded to peerage Replaced by James Hamlyn	
Castle Rising (seat 1/2)	Charles Boone	
Castle Rising (seat 2/2)	Hon. Henry Drummond – died Replaced by Charles Bagot Chester 1794	
Cheshire (seat 1/2)	John Crewe	Whig
Cheshire (seat 2/2)	Sir Robert Salusbury Cotton, Bt	
Chester (seat 1/2)	Viscount Belgrave	
Chester (seat 2/2)	Thomas Grosvenor – died Replaced by Thomas Grosvenor 1795	
Chichester (seat 1/2)	George White-Thomas	
Chichester (seat 2/2)	Thomas Steele	
Chippenham (seat 1/2)	James Dawkins	
Chippenham (seat 2/2)	George Fludyer	
Chipping Wycombe (seat 1/2)	Earl Wycombe	
Chipping Wycombe (seat 2/2)	Sir John Jervis– resigned Replaced by Sir Francis Baring 1794	
Christchurch (seat 1/2)	Hans Sloane	
Christchurch (seat 2/2)	George Rose	
Cirencester (seat 1/2)	Lord Apsley – succeeded to peerage Replaced by Michael Hicks Beach 1794	
Cirencester (seat 2/2)	Richard Master – unseated Replaced by (Sir) Robert Preston	
Clackmannanshire (seat 0/0)	Alternating seat with Kinross-shire. No representation in 1790	
Clitheroe (seat 1/2)	Sir John Aubrey, Bt	Tory
Clitheroe (seat 2/2)	Penn Assheton Curzon– resigned Replaced by Assheton Curzon– ennobled Replaced by Richard Erle-Drax-Grosvenor 1794	Tory
Cockermouth (seat 1/2)	John Baynes Garforth	Tory
Cockermouth (seat 2/2)	Sir John Anstruther, 1st and 4th Baronet	Tory
Colchester (seat 1/2)	Robert Thornton	
Colchester (seat 2/2)	George Jackson	
Corfe Castle (seat 1/2)	John Bond	Whig
Corfe Castle (seat 2/2)	Henry Bankes	Tory
Cornwall (seat 1/2)	Francis Gregor	Tory
Cornwall (seat 2/2)	Sir William Lemon	Whig
Coventry (seat 1/2)	Sir Sampson Gideon, Bt	
Coventry (seat 2/2)	John Eardley Wilmot	
Cricklade (seat 1/2)	John Walker-Heneage – resigned Replaced by Lord Porchester 1794	
Cricklade (seat 2/2)	Thomas Estcourt	
Cromartyshire (seat 1/1)	Duncan Davidson	
Cumberland (seat 1/2)	Henry Fletcher	
Cumberland (seat 2/2)	Humphrey Senhouse	
== D ==
Dartmouth (seat 1/2)	Edmund Bastard	
Dartmouth (seat 2/2)	John Charles Villiers	
Denbigh Boroughs (seat 1/1)	Richard Myddelton	
Denbighshire (seat 1/1)	Robert Watkin Wynne	
Derby (seat 1/2)	Lord George Cavendish	
Derby (seat 2/2)	Edward Coke	
Derbyshire (seat 1/2)	Lord George Cavendish – died Replaced by Lord John Cavendish 1794	Whig
Derbyshire (seat 2/2)	Edward Miller Mundy	
Devizes (seat 1/2)	by Joshua Smith	
Devizes (seat 2/2)	Henry Addington	
Devon (seat 1/2)	John Pollexfen Bastard	Tory
Devon (seat 2/2)	John Rolle	
Dorchester (seat 1/2)	Hon. George Damer – unseated on petition Replaced by Hon. Cropley Ashley 1791	
Dorchester (seat 2/2)	Francis Fane	
Dorset (seat 1/2)	Francis John Browne	
Dorset (seat 2/2)	Hon. George Pitt	
Dover (seat 1/2)	Charles Small Pybus	
Dover (seat 2/2)	John Trevanion	
Downton (seat 1/2)	Hon. Bartholomew Bouverie	
Downton (seat 2/2)	Sir William Scott	
Droitwich (seat 1/2)	Sir Edward Winnington, Bt	
Droitwich (seat 2/2)	Andrew Foley	
Dumfries Burghs (seat 1/1)	Patrick Miller	
Dumfriesshire (seat 1/1)	Sir Robert Laurie, Bt	
Dunbartonshire (seat 1/1)	Archibald Edmonstone	Tory
Dunwich (seat 1/2)	Barne Barne – resigned Replaced by Miles Barne 1791	
Dunwich (seat 2/2)	The Lord Huntingfield	
Durham (City of) (seat 1/2)	John Tempest – died Replaced by Sir Henry Vane 1794	
Durham (City of) (seat 2/2)	William Henry Lambton	
Durham (County) (seat 1/2)	Rowland Burdon	Tory
Durham (County) (seat 2/2)	Captain Ralph Milbanke	Whig
Dysart Burghs (seat 1/1)	Hon. Charles Hope	
== E ==
East Grinstead (seat 1/2)	Nathaniel Dance	
East Grinstead (seat 2/2)	William Hamilton Nisbet	
East Looe (seat 1/2)	Robert Wood	Tory
East Looe (seat 2/2)	William Wellesley Pole – resigned Replaced by Charles Arbuthnot 1795	Tory
East Retford (seat 1/2)	Sir John Ingilby	
East Retford (seat 2/2)	Earl of Lincoln – succeeded to peerage Replaced by	
Edinburgh (seat 1/1)	Henry Dundas	
Edinburghshire (seat 1/1)	Robert Dundas	
Elgin Burghs (seat 1/1)	Alexander Brodie	
Elginshire (seat 1/1)	Ludovick Alexander Grant	
Essex (seat 1/2)	Colonel John Bullock	
Essex (seat 2/2)	Thomas Berney Bramston	
Evesham (seat 1/2)	Thomas Thompson	
Evesham (seat 2/2)	John Rushout	
Exeter (seat 1/2)	James Buller	
Exeter (seat 2/2)	John Baring, 1776	
Eye (seat 1/2)	Richard Burton Phillipson – died Replaced by Peter Bathurst 1792– resigned Replaced by Viscount Brome 1795	
Eye (seat 2/2)	Hon. William Cornwallis	
== F ==
Fife (seat 1/1)	William Wemyss	
Flint Boroughs (seat 1/1)	Watkin Williams	
Flintshire (seat 1/1)	Sir Roger Mostyn, Bt	
Forfarshire (seat 1/1)	David Scott – resigned Replaced by William Maule 1796	
Fowey (seat 1/2)	Philip Rashleigh	
Fowey (seat 2/2)	Viscount Valletort – succeeded to peerage Replaced by Sylvester Douglas 1795	
== G ==
Gatton (seat 1/2)	John Nesbitt|	
Gatton (seat 2/2)	William Currie	
Glamorganshire (seat 1/1)	Thomas Wyndham	
Glasgow Burghs (seat 1/1)	William McDowall	
Gloucester (seat 1/2)	John Webb – died Replaced by Henry Thomas Howard 1795	
Gloucester (seat 2/2)	John Pitt	
Gloucestershire (seat 1/2)	Thomas Master	
Gloucestershire (seat 2/2)	Hon. George Cranfield Berkeley	
Grampound (seat 1/2)	Thomas Wallace	
Grampound (seat 2/2)	Jeremiah Crutchley	
Grantham (seat 1/2)	Francis Cockayne-Cust – died Replaced by Philip Yorke 1792 – died Replaced by Simon Yorke 1793	
Grantham (seat 2/2)	George Manners-Sutton	
Great Bedwyn (seat 1/2)	Marquess of Graham – succeeded to peerage Replaced by Viscount Stopford 1790	
Great Bedwyn (seat 2/2)	Lord Doune – died Replaced by Edward Hyde East	
Great Grimsby (seat 1/2)	John Harrison	
Great Grimsby (seat 2/2)	Dudley Long	
Great Marlow (seat 1/2)	Thomas Williams	Tory
Great Marlow (seat 2/2)	William Lee-Antonie	Whig
Great Yarmouth (seat 1/2)	Charles Townshend	
Great Yarmouth (seat 2/2)	Henry Beaufoy – died Replaced by Stephens Howe 1795	
Guildford (seat 1/2)	Viscount Cranley	
Guildford (seat 2/2)	George Holme Sumner	
== H ==
Haddington Burghs (seat 1/1)	Thomas Maitland	
Haddingtonshire (seat 1/1)	John Hamilton – took office Replaced by Hew Hamilton Dalrymple 1795	
Hampshire (seat 1/2)	Sir William Heathcote, Bt	
Hampshire (seat 2/2)	William John Chute	
Harwich (seat 1/2)	Thomas Orde	
Harwich (seat 2/2)	John Robinson	
Haslemere (seat 1/2)	William Gerard Hamilton	
Haslemere (seat 2/2)	John Lowther – sat for Westmorland; Replaced by Richard Penn 1790 – resigned Replaced by James Clarke Satterthwaite 1791	
Hastings (seat 1/2)	Sir Richard Pepper Arden – resigned Replaced by Robert Dundas 1794	
Hastings (seat 2/2)	John Stanley	
Haverfordwest (seat 1/1)	Lord Kensington	
Hedon (seat 1/2)	Lionel Darell	
Hedon (seat 2/2)	Beilby Thompson	
Helston (seat 1/2)	Sir Gilbert Elliott – took office Replaced by Charles Abbot 1795	Whig
Helston (seat 2/2)	Stephen Lushington	Whig
Hereford (seat 1/2)	James Walwyn	
Hereford (seat 2/2)	John Scudamore	
Herefordshire (seat 1/2)	Thomas Harley	Tory
Herefordshire (seat 2/2)	Sir George Cornewall, Bt	
Hertford (seat 1/2)	Nathaniel, Baron Dimsdale	
Hertford (seat 2/2)	John Calvert	
Hertfordshire (seat 1/2)	William Plumer	
Hertfordshire (seat 2/2)	William Baker	
Heytesbury (seat 1/2)	William Pierce Ashe A'Court – resigned Replaced by Michael Angelo Taylor 1790 – sat for Poole; Replaced The Earl of Barrymore 1791 – died Replaced by Charles Rose Ellis 1793	
Heytesbury (seat 2/2)	William Eden – ennobled Replaced by The Viscount Clifden 1793	
Higham Ferrers (seat 1/1)	Viscount Duncannon – sat for Knaresborough; Replaced by John Lee 1790 – died Replaced by James Adair 1793	
Hindon (seat 1/2)	William Thomas Beckford – resigned Replaced by Thomas Wildman 1795– died Replaced by James Wildman 1796	
Hindon (seat 2/2)	James Adams	
Honiton (seat 1/2)	Sir George Yonge, Bt	
Honiton (seat 2/2)	George Templer	
Horsham (seat 1/2)	Timothy Shelley – unseated on petition Replaced by Lord William Gordon 1792	
Horsham (seat 2/2)	Wilson Braddyll – unseated on petition Replaced by James Baillie 1792 – died Replaced by William Fullarton 1793	
Huntingdon (seat 1/2)	John George Montagu – died Replaced by Henry Speed 1790	
Huntingdon (seat 2/2)	John Willett Payne	
Huntingdonshire (seat 1/2)	Viscount Hinchingbrooke – succeeded to peerage Replaced by Lancelot Brown 1792 – resigned Replaced by Viscount Hinchingbrooke 1794	
Huntingdonshire (seat 2/2)	The Earl Ludlow	
Hythe (seat 1/2)	Sir Charles Farnaby	
Hythe (seat 2/2)	William Evelyn	
== I ==
Ilchester (seat 1/2)	John Harcourt	
Ilchester (seat 2/2)	Samuel Long	
Inverness Burghs (seat 1/1)	Sir Hector Munro	
Inverness-shire (seat 1/1)	Norman Macleod	
Ipswich (seat 1/2)	Sir John D'Oyly	
Ipswich (seat 2/2)	Charles Crickitt	
== K ==
Kent (seat 1/2)	Sir Edward Knatchbull, 8th Bt	
Kent (seat 2/2)	Filmer Honywood	
Kincardineshire (seat 1/1)	Robert Barclay Allardice	
King's Lynn (seat 1/2)	Hon. Horatio Walpole	
King's Lynn (seat 2/2)	Sir Martin ffolkes	
Kingston upon Hull (seat 1/2)	Samuel Thornton	
Kingston upon Hull (seat 2/2)	Earl of Burford	
Kinross-shire (seat 0/0)	George Graham	
Kirkcudbright Stewartry (seat 1/1)	Alexander Stewart – died Replaced by Patrick Heron 1795	
Knaresborough (seat 1/2)	James Hare	
Knaresborough (seat 2/2)	Viscount Duncannon – succeeded to peerage Replaced by Lord John Townshend 1793	
== L ==
Lanarkshire (seat 1/1)	Sir James Denham-Steuart, Bt	
Lancashire (seat 1/2)	Thomas Stanley	
Lancashire (seat 2/2)	John Blackburne	
Lancaster (seat 1/2)	Sir George Warren 1786	
Lancaster (seat 2/2)	John Dent	
Launceston (seat 1/2)	John Rodney	Tory
Launceston (seat 2/2)	Sir Henry Clinton – took office Replaced by William Garthshore 1795	Tory; Tory
Leicester (seat 1/2)	Thomas Boothby Parkyns	
Leicester (seat 2/2)	Samuel Smith	
Leicestershire (seat 1/2)	William Pochin	
Leicestershire (seat 2/2)	Sir Thomas Cave– died Replaced by Penn Assheton Curzon 1792	
Leominster (seat 1/2)	John Hunter	
Leominster (seat 2/2)	John Sawyer	
Lewes (seat 1/2)	Henry Pelham	
Lewes (seat 2/2)	Thomas Kemp	
Lichfield (seat 1/2)	Thomas Gilbert – resigned Replaced by Lord Granville Leveson Gower 1795	
Lichfield (seat 1/2)	Thomas Anson	
Lincoln (seat 1/2)	John Fenton-Cawthorne – expelled Replaced by George Rawdon 1796	
Lincoln (seat 2/2)	Robert Hobart	
Lincolnshire (seat 1/2)	Sir John Thorold	
Lincolnshire (seat 2/2)	Charles Anderson-Pelham – ennobled Replaced by Robert Vyner 1794	
Linlithgow Burghs (seat 1/1)	William Grieve	
Linlithgowshire (seat 1/1)	John Hope	
Liskeard (seat 1/2)	Edward James Eliot	
Liskeard (seat 2/2)	John Eliot	
Liverpool (seat 1/2)	Bamber Gascoyne	Tory
Liverpool (seat 2/2)	Colonel Banastre Tarleton	Tory
London (City of) (seat 1/4)	John Sawbridge – died Replaced by William Lushington 1795	
London (City of) (seat 2/4)	Brook Watson – resigned Replaced by John William Anderson 1793	
London (City of) (seat 3/4)	Sir William Curtis	
London (City of) (seat 4/4)	Sir Watkin Lewes	
Lostwithiel (seat 1/2)	Viscount Valletort – sat for Fowey; Replaced by George Smith 1791	
Lostwithiel (seat 2/2)	Reginald Pole-Carew	
Ludgershall (seat 1/2)	George Augustus Selwyn – died Replaced by Samuel Smith 1791 – died Replaced by Nathaniel Newnham 1793	
Ludgershall (seat 2/2)	Hon. William Assheton Harbord	
Ludlow (seat 1/2)	Richard Payne Knight	
Ludlow (seat 2/2)	The Lord Clive – ennobled Replaced by Robert Clive 1794	
Lyme Regis (seat 1/2)	Hon. Henry Fane	
Lyme Regis (seat 2/2)	Hon. Thomas Fane	
Lymington (seat 1/2)	Harry Burrard – took office Replaced by Nathaniel Brassey Halhed 1791	
Lymington (seat 2/2)	(Sir) Harry Burrard	
== M ==
Maidstone (seat 1/2)	Sir Matthew Bloxham	
Maidstone (seat 2/2)	Clement Taylor	
Maldon (seat 1/2)	Joseph Holden Strutt	Tory
Maldon (seat 2/2)	Charles Callis Western	
Malmesbury (seat 1/2)	Benjamin Bond Hopkins – died Replaced by Francis Glanville 1794	
Malmesbury (seat 2/2)	Paul Benfield – resigned Replaced by Sir James Sanderson 1792	
Malton (seat 1/2)	Edmund Burke – resigned Replaced by Richard Burke 1794 – died Replaced by William Baldwin	Whig whig whig
Malton (seat 2/2)	William Weddell – died Replaced by George Damer 1792	whig whig
Marlborough (seat 1/2)	The Earl of Courtown – resigned Replaced by Earl of Dalkeith 1793	
Marlborough (seat 2/2)	Major-General the Hon. Thomas Bruce	
Merionethshire (seat 1/1)	Evan Lloyd Vaughan – died Replaced by Robert Williames Vaughan 1792	
Middlesex (seat 1/2)	George Byng	Whig
Middlesex (seat 2/2)	William Mainwaring	Tory
Midhurst (seat 1/2)	Hon. Percy Wyndham	
Midhurst (seat 2/2)	Charles William Wyndham – resigned Replaced by Peter Isaac Thellusson 1795	
Milborne Port (seat 1/2)	William Coles Medlycott – resigned Replaced by Richard Johnson 1791 – resigned Replaced by Mark Wood 1794	
Milborne Port (seat 2/2)	John Pennington	
Minehead (seat 1/2)	Viscount Parker – succeeded to peerage Replaced by Thomas Fownes Luttrell	
Minehead (seat 2/2)	John Fownes Luttrell	
Mitchell (seat 1/2)	David Howell	
Mitchell (seat 2/2)	Sir Christopher Hawkins	
Monmouth Boroughs (seat 1/1)	Marquess of Worcester – sat for Bristol; Replaced by Charles Bragge 1790	
Monmouthshire (seat 1/2)	John Morgan – died Replaced by Robert Salusbury 1792	
Monmouthshire (seat 2/2)	James Rooke	
Montgomery (seat 1/1)	Whitshed Keene	
Montgomeryshire (seat 1/1)	William Mostyn Owen – died Replaced by Francis Lloyd 1795	
Morpeth (seat 1/2)	Major Sir James Erskine	
Morpeth (seat 2/2)	Francis Gregg – resigned Replaced by Viscount Morpeth 1795	
== N ==
Nairnshire (seat 1/1)	Alternating seat with Cromartyshire. No representation in 1790	
Newark (seat 1/2)	John Manners-Sutton	
Newark (seat 2/2)	William Crosbie	
Newcastle-under-Lyme (seat 1/2)	John Leveson Gower – died Replaced by William Egerton 1792	
Newcastle-under-Lyme (seat 2/2)	Sir Archibald Macdonald – took office Replaced by Sir Francis Ford 1793	
Newcastle-upon-Tyne (seat 1/2)	Charles Brandling	
Newcastle-upon-Tyne (seat 2/2)	Sir Matthew White Ridley, Bt	
Newport (Cornwall) (seat 1/2)	Viscount Feilding	
Newport (Cornwall) (seat 2/2)	Charles Rainsford	
Newport (Isle of Wight) (seat 1/2)	The Viscount Palmerston	
Newport (Isle of Wight) (seat 2/2)	The Viscount Melbourne– resigned Replaced by Peniston Lamb 1793	
New Radnor Boroughs (seat 1/1)	David Murray– died Replaced by Viscount Malden 1794	
New Romney (seat 1/2)	Richard Joseph Sullivan	
New Romney (seat 2/2)	Sir Elijah Impey	
New Shoreham (seat 1/2)	Sir Harry Goring	
New Shoreham (seat 2/2)	John Clater Aldridge – died Replaced by Charles William Wyndham 1795	
Newton (Lancashire) (seat 1/2)	Thomas Peter Legh	
Newton (Lancashire) (seat 2/2)	Thomas Brooke	
Newtown (Isle of Wight) (seat 1/2)	Sir Richard Worsley – resigned Replaced by George Canning 1793	
Newtown (Isle of Wight) (seat 2/2)	Sir John Barrington, Bt	
New Windsor (seat 1/2)	Peniston Portlock Powney – died Replaced by William Grant 1794	Tory
New Windsor (seat 2/2)	The Earl of Mornington	
New Woodstock (seat 1/2)	Sir Henry Watkin Dashwood	
New Woodstock (seat 2/2)	Lord Henry John Spencer – died Replaced by The Lord Lavington	
Norfolk (seat 1/2)	Thomas Coke	
Norfolk (seat 2/2)	Sir John Wodehouse, Bt	
Northallerton (seat 1/2)	Edward Lascelles	
Northallerton (seat 2/2)	Henry Peirse (younger)	
Northampton (seat 1/2)	Lord Compton – succeeded to peerage Replaced by Spencer Perceval 1796	
Northampton (seat 2/2)	Hon. Edward Bouverie	
Northamptonshire (seat 1/2)	Francis Dickins	
Northamptonshire (seat 2/2)	Thomas Powys	
Northumberland (seat 1/2)	Hon. Charles Grey	
Northumberland (seat 2/2)	Sir William Middleton, Bt – died Replaced by Thomas Richard Beaumont 1795	
Norwich (seat 1/2)	Hon. Henry Hobart	
Norwich (seat 2/2)	William Windham	
Nottingham (seat 1/2)	Daniel Coke	
Nottingham (seat 2/2)	Robert Smith	
Nottinghamshire (seat 1/2)	Lord Edward Bentinck	
Nottinghamshire (seat 2/2)	Charles Medows (Charles Pierrepont)	
== O ==
Okehampton (seat 1/2)	Colonel John St Leger	
Okehampton (seat 2/2)	Robert Ladbroke	
Old Sarum (seat 1/2)	George Hardinge	
Old Sarum (seat 2/2)	John Sullivan	
Orford (seat 1/2)	Viscount Beauchamp – succeeded to peerage Replaced by Lord Robert Seymour	
Orford (seat 2/2)	Hon. William Seymour	Tory
Orkney and Shetland (seat 1/1)	Thomas Dundas	
Oxford (seat 1/2)	Francis Burton	
Oxford (seat 2/2)	Captain the Hon. Peregrine Bertie – died Replaced by Arthur Annesley 1790	
Oxfordshire (seat 1/2)	Marquess of Blandford	Whig
Oxfordshire (seat 2/2)	Viscount Wenman	
Oxford University (seat 1/2)	Francis Page	
Oxford University (seat 2/2)	Sir William Dolben, Bt	
== P ==
Peeblesshire (seat 1/1)	William Montgomery	
Pembroke Boroughs (seat 1/1)	Hugh Barlow	Whig
Pembrokeshire (seat 1/1)	The Lord Milford	
Penryn (seat 1/2)	Sir Francis Basset	
Penryn (seat 2/2)	Richard Glover	
Perth Burghs (seat 1/1)	George Murray – resigned Replaced by David Scott	
Perthshire (seat 1/1)	James Murray – died Replaced by Thomas Graham 1794	
Peterborough (seat 1/2)	Richard Benyon	
Peterborough (seat 2/2)	Hon. Lionel Damer	
Petersfield (seat 1/2)	William Jolliffe	
Petersfield (seat 2/2)	Lord North – resigned Replaced by Marquess of Titchfield 1790 – resigned Replaced by Welbore Ellis 1791 – ennobled Replaced by Charles Greville 1795	
Plymouth (seat 1/2)	Sir Frederick Leman Rogers	
Plymouth (seat 2/2)	Alan Gardner	
Plympton Erle (seat 1/2)	The Earl of Carhampton– resigned Replaced by William Manning 1794	
Plympton Erle (seat 2/2)	Philip Metcalfe	
Pontefract (seat 1/2)	William Sotheron	
Pontefract (seat 2/2)	John Smyth	
Poole (seat 1/2)	Hon. Charles Stuart – unseated on petition Replaced by Michael Angelo Taylor 1791	
Poole (seat 2/2)	Benjamin Lester	
Portsmouth (seat 1/2)	Sir Henry Fetherstonhaugh, Bt	
Portsmouth (seat 2/2)	Hon. Thomas Erskine	Whig
Preston (seat 1/2)	John Burgoyne – died Replaced by William Cunliffe Shawe 1792	
Preston (seat 2/2)	Sir Harry Hoghton, Bt – died Replaced by Sir Henry Philip Hoghton 1795	
== Q ==
Queenborough (seat 1/2)	Gibbs Crawfurd| – died Replaced by Augustus Rogers 1793 – resigned Replaced by John Sargent 1794	
Queenborough (seat 2/2)	Richard Hopkins	
== R ==
Radnorshire (seat 1/1)	Thomas Johnes	
Reading (seat 1/2)	Richard Aldworth-Neville	
Reading (seat 2/2)	Francis Annesley	
Reigate (seat 1/2)	John Somers Cocks	
Reigate (seat 2/2)	Joseph Sydney Yorke	
Renfrewshire (seat 1/1)	John Shaw-Stewart	
Richmond (Yorkshire) (seat 1/2)	The Earl of Inchiquin	
Richmond (Yorkshire) (seat 2/2)	Lawrence Dundas	
Ripon (seat 1/2)	William Lawrence	
Ripon (seat 2/2)	Sir George Allanson-Winn, Bt	
Rochester (seat 1/2)	George Best	
Rochester (seat 2/2)	Sir Richard Bickerton – died Replaced by Nathaniel Smith 1792 – died Replaced by Sir Richard King 1794	
Ross-shire (seat 1/1)	William Adam– resigned Replaced by Francis Humberston Mackenzie 1794	
Roxburghshire (seat 1/1)	Sir George Douglas	
Rutland (seat 1/2)	Gerard Edwardes	Whig
Rutland (seat 2/2)	John Heathcote – died Replaced by Lord Sherard	
Rye (seat 1/2)	Charles Long	
Rye (seat 2/2)	Hon. Robert Banks Jenkinson	
== S ==
St Albans (seat 1/2)	Hon. Richard Bingham	
St Albans (seat 2/2)	John Calvert	
St Germans (seat 1/2)	The Marquess of Lorne	
St Germans (seat 2/2)	Edward James Eliot – sat for Liskeard; Replaced by William Eliot 1791	
St Ives (seat 1/2)	William Praed	
St Ives (seat 2/2)	William Mills	
St Mawes (seat 1/2)	Sir William Young	
St Mawes (seat 2/2)	John Graves Simcoe – took office Replaced by Thomas Calvert 1792 – resigned Replaced by William Drummond 1795	
Salisbury (seat 1/2)	Hon. William Henry Bouverie	
Salisbury (seat 2/2)	William Hussey	
Saltash (seat 1/2)	Edward Bearcroft	
Saltash (seat 2/2)	Viscount Garlies – resigned Replaced by William Stewart 1795	
Sandwich (seat 1/2)	Philip Stephens	
Sandwich (seat 2/2)	Sir Horatio Mann	
Scarborough (seat 1/2)	Earl of Tyrconnell	Tory
Scarborough (seat 2/2)	The Lord Mulgrave – ennobled Replaced by Edmund Phipps 1794	Tory
Seaford (seat 1/2)	John Sargent – took office Replaced by Richard Paul Jodrell 1794	
Seaford (seat 2/2)	Richard Paul Jodrell; Replaced by John Tarleton 1792	
Selkirkshire (seat 1/1)	Mark Pringle	
Shaftesbury (seat 1/2)	Charles Duncombe	
Shaftesbury (seat 2/2)	William Grant – took office Replaced by Paul Benfield 1793	
Shrewsbury (seat 1/2)	William Pulteney	Whig
Shrewsbury (seat 2/2)	John Hill	Tory
Shropshire (seat 1/2)	John Kynaston	
Shropshire (seat 2/2)	Sir Richard Hill	
Somerset (seat 1/2)	Sir John Trevelyan, Bt	
Somerset (seat 2/2)	Edward Phelips – died Replaced by Henry Hippisley Coxe 1792 – died Replaced by William Gore Langton 1795	
Southampton (seat 1/2)	Sir Henry Martin – died Replaced by George Henry Rose 1794	
Southampton (seat 2/2)	James Amyatt	
Southwark (seat 1/2)	Henry Thornton	
Southwark (seat 2/2)	Paul le Mesurier	
Stafford (seat 1/2)	Edward Monckton	Tory
Stafford (seat 2/2)	Richard Brinsley Sheridan	Whig
Staffordshire (seat 1/2)	Sir Edward Littleton	Whig
Staffordshire (seat 2/2)	Earl Gower	Whig
Stamford (seat 1/2)	The Earl of Carysfort	
Stamford (seat 2/2)	Lieutenant-General (Sir) George Howard	
Steyning (seat 1/2)	James Martin Lloyd – unseated on petition Replaced by Sir John Honywood 1791 – sat for Canterbury; Replaced by James Martin Lloyd 1791 – unseated on petition Replaced by Samuel Whitbread 1792	Whig; Tory; Whig; Tory
Steyning (seat 2/2)	Henry Thomas Howard1791 – unseated on petition Replaced by John Curtis – resigned Replaced by John Henniker Major 1794	Whig; Tory; Whig
Stirling Burghs (seat 1/1)	Archibald Campbell – died Replaced by Andrew James Cochrane 1791	
Stirlingshire (seat 1/1)	Sir Thomas Dundas – ennobled Replaced by Robert Graham 1794	Pro-Admin Whig
Stockbridge (seat 1/2)	John Cator – unseated on petition Replaced by Joseph Foster Barham 1793	
Stockbridge (seat 2/2)	John Scott – unseated on petition Replaced by George Porter 1793	
Sudbury (seat 1/2)	John Coxe Hippisley	
Sudbury (seat 2/2)	Thomas Champion Crespigny	
Suffolk (seat 1/2)	Sir Charles Bunbury, Bt |	
Suffolk (seat 2/2)	Sir John Rous, Bt	
Surrey (seat 1/2)	William Clement Finch – died Replaced by Sir John Frederick	
Surrey (seat 2/2)	Sir Joseph Mawbey, Bt	
Sussex (seat 1/2)	Thomas Pelham	
Sussex (seat 2/2)	Charles Lennox	
Sutherland (seat 1/1)	James Grant	
== T ==
Tain Burghs (seat 1/1)	Sir Charles Lockhart-Ross, Bt	
Tamworth (seat 1/2)	John Courtenay	
Tamworth (seat 2/2)	Sir Robert Peel	
Taunton (seat 1/2)	Alexander Popham	
Taunton (seat 2/2)	(Sir) Benjamin Hammet	
Tavistock (seat 1/2)	Charles William Wyndham – sat for Midhurst; Replaced by Lord John Russell 1790	
Tavistock (seat 2/2)	Hon. Richard Fitzpatrick	
Tewkesbury (seat 1/2)	James Martin	Whig
Tewkesbury (seat 2/2)	Sir William Codrington, Bt – died Replaced by William Dowdeswell 1792	Tory; Tory
Thetford (seat 1/2)	Robert John Buxton	
Thetford (seat 2/2)	Joseph Randyll Burch	
Thirsk (seat 1/2)	Robert Vyner	
Thirsk (seat 2/2)	Sir Gregory Page-Turner	
Tiverton (seat 1/2)	Hon. Dudley Ryder	
Tiverton (seat 2/2)	John Duntze – died Replaced by Richard Ryder 1795	
Totnes (seat 1/2)	William Powlett Powlett	
Totnes (seat 2/2)	Sir Francis Buller Yarde, Bt	
Tregony (seat 1/2)	John Stephenson– died Replaced by Robert Stewart 1794	
Tregony (seat 2/2)	Matthew Montagu	
Truro (seat 1/2)	James Gordon	
Truro (seat 2/2)	William Augustus Spencer Boscawen – took office Replaced by Charles Ingoldsby Paulet 1792	
== W ==
Wallingford (seat 1/2)	Nathaniel William Wraxall – resigned Replaced by Francis William Sykes 1794	
Wallingford (seat 2/2)	Sir Francis Sykes, Bt	
Wareham (seat 1/2)	General Richard Smith	
Wareham (seat 2/2)	Lord Robert Spencer	
Warwick (seat 1/2)	The Lord Arden	
Warwick (seat 2/2)	Henry Gage– ennobled Replaced by George Villiers 1792	
Warwickshire (seat 1/2)	Sir Robert Lawley, Bt – died Replaced by Sir John Mordaunt 1793	
Warwickshire (seat 2/2)	Sir George Shuckburgh, Bt	
Wells (seat 1/2)	Henry Berkeley Portman	
Wells (seat 2/2)	Clement Tudway	
Wendover (seat 1/2)	John Barker Church	
Wendover (seat 2/2)	Hon. Hugh Seymour-Conway	
Wenlock (seat 1/2)	Sir Henry Bridgeman – ennobled Replaced by John Simpson 1794	
Wenlock (seat 2/2)	Cecil Forester	
Weobley (seat 1/2)	Hon. Thomas Thynne – sat for Bath; Replaced by Lord George Thynne 1790	
Weobley (seat 2/2)	(Sir) John Scott	
Westbury (seat 1/2)	Ewan Law – resigned Replaced by Samuel Estwick (younger) 1795	
Westbury (seat 2/2)	Samuel Estwick – died Replaced by Edward Wilbraham Bootle 1795	
West Looe (seat 1/2)	Sir John de la Pole	
West Looe (seat 2/2)	John Pardoe	
Westminster (seat 1/2)	Samuel Hood	
Westminster (seat 2/2)	Charles James Fox	
Westmorland (seat 1/2)	James Lowther	
Westmorland (seat 2/2)	Sir Michael le Fleming	
Weymouth and Melcombe Regis (seat 1/4)	Colonel Sir James Murray	
Weymouth and Melcombe Regis (seat 2/4)	(Sir) Richard Bempde Johnstone	
Weymouth and Melcombe Regis (seat 3/4)	Andrew Stuart	
Weymouth and Melcombe Regis (seat 4/4)	Thomas Jones – resigned Replaced by Sir James Johnstone 1791 – died Replaced by Gabriel Tucker Steward 1794	
Whitchurch (seat 1/2)	The Viscount Midleton	
Whitchurch (seat 2/2)	Hon. John Townshend	
Wigan (seat 1/2)	Orlando Bridgeman	
Wigan (seat 2/2)	John Cotes	
Wigtown Burghs (seat 1/1)	Nisbet Balfour	
Wigtownshire (seat 1/1)	Andrew McDouall	
Wilton (seat 1/2)	Lord Herbert – succeeded to peerage Replaced by Philip Goldsworthy 1794	
Wilton (seat 2/2)	The Viscount FitzWilliam	
Wiltshire (seat 1/2)	Sir James Tylney-Long – died Replaced by Henry Penruddocke Wyndham 1795	
Wiltshire (seat 2/2)	Ambrose Goddard	
Winchelsea (seat 1/2)	Viscount Barnard – succeeded to peerage Replaced by Sir Frederick Fletcher Vane – resigned Replaced by John Hiley Addington	
Richard Barwell		
Winchester (seat 1/2)	Henry Penton	
Winchester (seat 2/2)	Richard Grace Gamon	
Wootton Bassett (seat 1/2)	John Thomas Stanley	
Wootton Bassett (seat 2/2)	The Viscount Downe	
Worcester (seat 1/2)	Edmund Wigley	
Worcester (seat 2/2)	Edmund Lechmere	
Worcestershire (seat 1/2)	Edward Foley	
Worcestershire (seat 2/2)	William Lygon	
== Y ==
Yarmouth (Isle of Wight) (seat 1/2)	Thomas Clarke Jervoise – resigned Replaced by Jervoise Clarke Jervoise 1791	
Yarmouth (Isle of Wight) (seat 2/2)	Edward Rushworth resigned Replaced by Sir John Fleming Leicester 1791	
York (seat 1/2)	Sir William Mordaunt Milner, Bt	
York (seat 2/2)	Richard Slater Milnes	
Yorkshire (seat 1/2)	Henry Duncombe	
Yorkshire (seat 2/2)	William Wilberforce	

== By-elections ==
- List of Great Britain by-elections (1790–1800)

== See also ==
- List of parliaments of Great Britain
- Unreformed House of Commons
