= Francis John Browne =

British politician (1754–1833)

Member of Parliament for Dorset
- In office 1784–1806

Personal details
- Born: 4 October 1754 Dorset
- Died: 29 March 1833 (aged 78) Weymouth, Dorset

Francis John Browne (4 October 1754 – 29 March 1833) was an English politician who served as member of parliament for Dorset from 1784 to 1806. He was High Sheriff of Dorset from 1783 to 1784.

== See also ==
- List of MPs elected in the 1796 British general election
- List of MPs elected in the 1784 British general election
- List of MPs in the first United Kingdom Parliament
- List of MPs elected in the 1802 United Kingdom general election
- List of MPs elected in the 1790 British general election
