= George Barclay (MP) =

English politician (died 1819)

Member of Parliament for Poole
- In office 1795–1807

Personal details
- Born: 1759
- Died: 8 June 1819 (aged 59–60)

George Barclay (c.1759 – 8 June 1819) was an English politician who was Member of Parliament for Bridport from 1795 to 1807.

== See also ==
- List of MPs in the first United Kingdom Parliament
- List of MPs elected in the 1796 British general election
- List of MPs elected in the 1806 United Kingdom general election
- List of MPs elected in the 1802 United Kingdom general election
- List of MPs elected in the 1790 British general election
