= Joseph Hankey =

Member of Parliament for Wareham
- In office 1 March 1799 – 1802
- Preceded by: Lord Robert Spencer
- Succeeded by: Andrew Strahan

Personal details
- Born: 1754
- Died: 7 April 1803 (aged 48–49)

Joseph Chaplin Hankey II (1754 – 7 April 1803) was an English banker who was Member of Parliament for Wareham.

== Biography ==
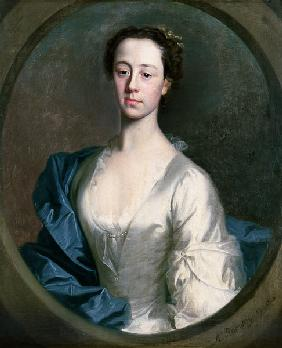
Portrait of Catherine Gale (1716–1773), his mother

Joseph Hankey was born into a Fenchurch Street family of bankers. His father made money in the slave trade in Jamaica. His brother Richard Hankey was also an MP.

== See also ==
- List of MPs elected in the 1796 British general election
- List of MPs in the first United Kingdom Parliament
