= Richard Hankey =

Member of Parliament for Plympton Erle
- In office 17 June 1799 – 1802
- Preceded by: William Mitchell
- Succeeded by: Philip Metcalfe

Personal details
- Born: 1766
- Died: 15 March 1817 (aged 50–51)
- Education: Gray's Inn

Richard Hankey (1766 – 15 March 1817) was an English banker who was Member of Parliament for Plympton Erle.

== Biography ==
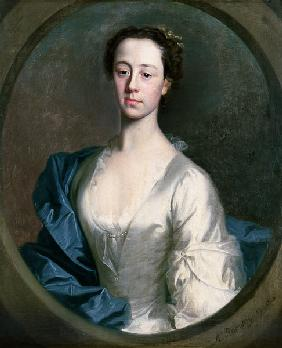
Portrait of Catherine Gale (1716–1773), his mother

Richard Hankey was born into a Fenchurch Street family of bankers. His father made money in the slave trade in Jamaica. His brother Joseph Hankey was also an MP.

== See also ==
- List of MPs elected in the 1796 British general election
- List of MPs in the first United Kingdom Parliament
