= John Simpson (died 1803) =

English politician

John Simpson (died 1803) was a British politician and the Member of Parliament for Mitchell from 1799 to 1802.

== See also ==
- List of MPs in the first United Kingdom Parliament
