= William Mitchell (1742–1823) =

British planter (1742–1823)

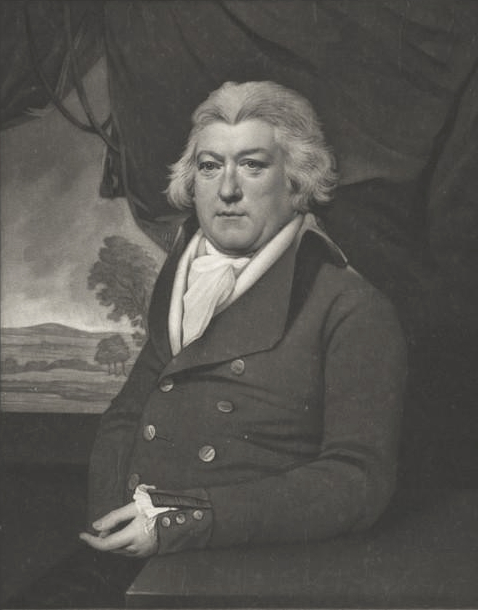
William Mitchell, engraved portrait

William Mitchell (1742–1823) was a British planter, attorney and official in Jamaica, where he was known as "King Mitchell" for his many interests in plantations. He was also a Member of Parliament at Westminster, and West India Interest activist.

== Life ==
He was the eldest son of John Mitchell of Doune, Perthshire and his wife Margaret Ferguson.

Mitchell was elected one of the Members of Parliament for Plympton Erle in 1796, supported by Paul Treby Treby.

While the position of Receiver General of Jamaica was held in name at the time by Viscount Sackville, the post was leased. William Mitchell's brother James died as the lease-holder. William Mitchell went to Jamaica in 1798, and it is presumed the reason was to take up the lease on the lucrative office. He filled his brother's seat in the Jamaican assembly in 1798; and resigned as a Westminster MP in 1799, his place there being taken in a by-election by Richard Hankey. He renewed the lease in 1808 with Lord George Sackville-Germain, younger brother of the previous holder, to whom the title had passed.

Mitchell gave evidence to a parliamentary committee in 1807. By the 1820s, he no longer lived in Jamaica.

== Family ==
Mitchell and his wife Catherine Hamilton had a daughter but no sons. He left his Jamaican and Scottish property to John Mitchell, one of the five sons of his brother David, a London merchant in business with Robert Milligan.
