= Stephen Thurston Adey =

English politician

- Died: October 28, 1811
- Occupations: politician, banker

Stephen Thurston Adey (4 March 1754 – 28 October 1801) was an English politician and Member of Parliament for Higham Ferrers from 1798 to 1801.

== See also ==
- List of MPs in the first United Kingdom Parliament
