= William Tait (MP) =

Scottish politician and landowner (c. 1755-1800)

William Tait MP FRSE (c. 1755 – 7 January 1800) was an 18th-century Scottish politician and landowner. He was MP for Stirling Burghs 1797 to 1800.

== Life ==
He was born in Edinburgh around 1755, the second son of Alexander Tait (died 1781), a Writer to the Signet (WS) and Principal Clerk of Session to the courts, and his wife Janet Blair of Blair. He studied law at the University of Edinburgh and was admitted into Lincoln's Inn in 1777. He became an advocate in 1780, and acted as personal legal advisor to Henry Dundas. He became Advocate Depute in 1787 and Sheriff of Stirling and Clackmannan in 1790.

In 1790 he was elected a Fellow of the Royal Society of Edinburgh. His proposer was Alexander Fraser Tytler.

In 1797 he stood for election in Stirling Burghs and was elected on 17 July 1797. He was a member of William Pitt's government.

He died in Exeter on 7 January 1800.

== Family ==
He was unmarried and had no children.

Parliament of Great Britain
Preceded by Andrew Cochrane-Johnstone	Member of Parliament for Stirling Burghs; 1797 – February 1800	Succeeded by Alexander Cochrane
