= François-Joseph-Marie-Henry, comte de Viry =

François-Joseph-Marie-Henry, comte de Viry (27 July 1766 – 15 January 1820), known before 1813 as baron de la Ferrière and in England as Henry Speed, was a Savoyard nobleman who sat in both the House of Commons of Great Britain and the Chamber of Deputies of France.

== Biography ==
He was born in London, the son of François-Marie-Joseph-Justin, comte de Viry by his first wife, the Englishwoman Henrietta Jane Speed. His father and grandfather served as diplomats of the Kingdom of Sardinia. In 1776 he joined the chevau-légers of Savoy and in 1789 went to England to serve as equerry to the Duke of Gloucester, a post he would hold until 1792.

On 24 October 1789, under the name Henry Speed and despite his father's disapproval, he was married to Augusta Montagu, a natural daughter of the Earl of Sandwich; they would go on to have four sons (including Charles de Viry) and a daughter. The following year he was elected to Parliament for Huntingdon through Sandwich's influence, and he was made a member of Brooks's in 1791. He never spoke in Parliament and last attended in 1794. In July 1795 he fled while on trial for fraud in the Court of King's Bench, and in December, having taken refuge in the Isle of Man, he pleaded parliamentary privilege after being arrested for debt by a Liverpool merchant. He was not re-elected in 1796. In 1798 he was made a lieutenant in the Isle of Man Volunteers, and was promoted to captain in the 1st Battalion in 1803.

Speed's father had supported Napoleon Bonaparte, and so had retained his estates at Viry, which passed to his son in 1813. The comte de Viry returned to France on the Bourbon restoration, and on 22 August 1815 was elected deputy for Mont-Blanc. In the chamber he supported the ultra-royalist majority. He was not elected again in 1816, by which time Mont-Blanc had been restored to the Duchy of Savoy. He died at Tours.
