= Charles Bagot Chester =

English politician

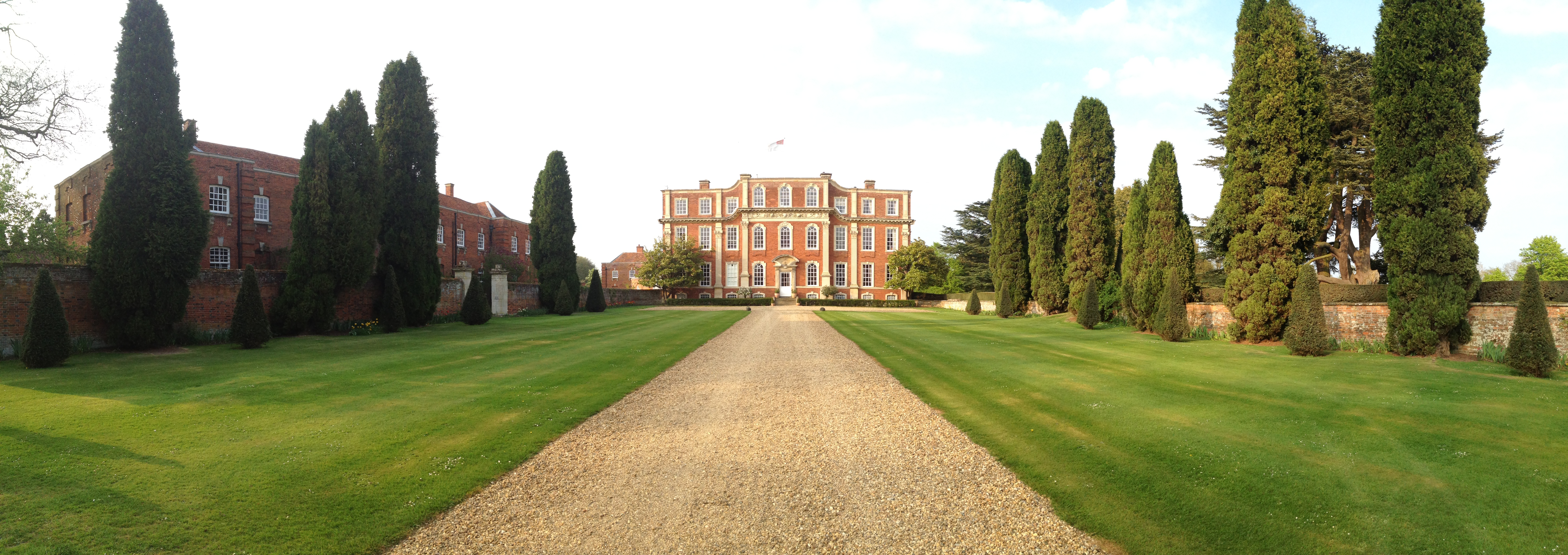
Chicheley Hall

Charles Bagot Chester (25 October 1770 – 1 June 1838), of Chicheley Hall, Buckinghamshire, was an English politician.

He was the eldest son of merchant Charles Bagot Chester, born Charles Bagot, who had adopted the name of Chester in 1755 when he inherited Chicheley Hall and other estates from his cousin Sir Charles Bagot Chester, 7th Baronet. Charles jnr was educated at Westminster School (1783-8) and Christ Church, Oxford (1788) and succeeded his father in 1793.

He was a Member of Parliament (MP) of the Parliament of Great Britain for Castle Rising from 14 July 1794 to 1807. More interested in fashion, horse racing and gambling than politics, he had to sell some of his estates to settle his debts.

In 1822 his sister Mary Jenkinson, Countess of Liverpool married the then Prime Minister, Robert Jenkinson, 2nd Earl of Liverpool.

He died unmarried at Hampton Court in 1838 and left Chicheley to his nephew, the Revd. Anthony Chester.
