= Charles Small Pybus =

British politician

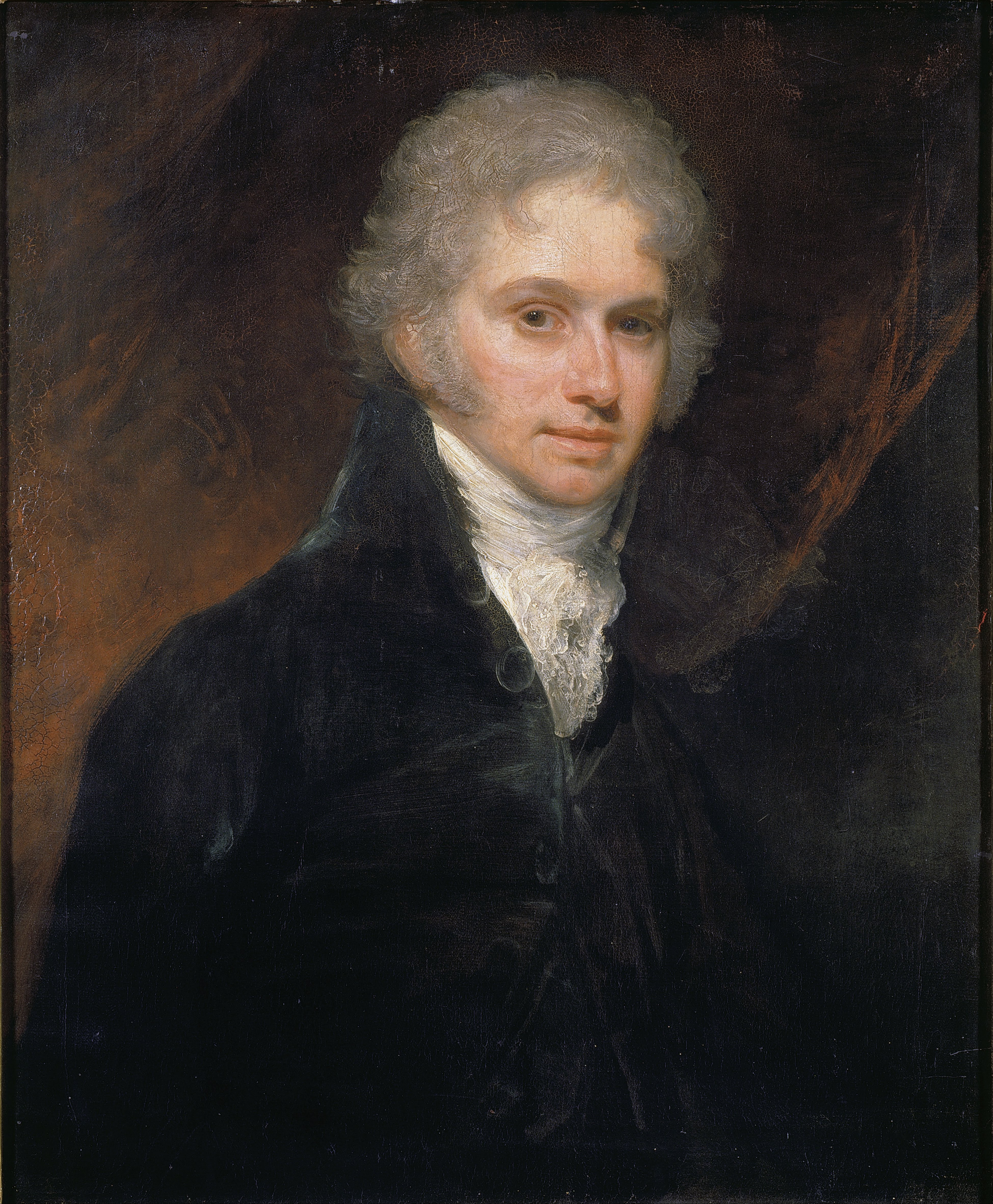
Charles Small Pybus, 1790s portrait

Charles Small Pybus (1766–1810) was an English barrister and politician.

== Life ==
He was the second son of the banker John Pybus and his wife Martha Small, born 3 November 1766, in the East Indies. He was educated in at Harrow School. He matriculated at St John's College, Cambridge in 1781, and in the same year entered Lincoln's Inn. He entered the Inner Temple in 1784, graduated B.A. in 1786 and M.A. in 1789 at Cambridge, and was called to the bar in 1789.

Pybus was elected Member of Parliament for Dover, where there was a family connection, at a by-election in 1789. He impressed William Pitt the younger with early parliamentary speeches: others found him vain and pretentious. He became a Lord of the Admiralty in 1791, and then a Lord of the Treasury from 1797. He held his seat until 1802. He died unmarried on 5 September 1810.
