= Charles Brandling =

English politician

Charles Brandling (1733 – 29 June 1802) was an English politician who sat as MP for Newcastle-upon-Tyne from 1784 till December 1797.

He was baptised on 5 July 1733. He was the ninth child and second son of Ralph Brandling and Eleanor, the daughter of Robert Ogle. On 3 September 1756, he married Elizabeth, the daughter and heiress of John Thompson and they had 5 sons and 8 daughters.

From 1781 till 1782, he served as Sheriff of Northumberland.
