= John Campbell (1750–1826) =

Scottish lawyer and politician (1750–1826)

John Campbell (c. 1750 – 31 January 1826) was a Scottish lawyer and politician. He practiced law in England, and sat in the House of Commons for twelve years.

Campbell was the second son of William Campbell of Liston Hall in Essex, a younger brother of 4th Duke of Argyll and grandson of the 9th Earl of Argyll. His mother was William's first wife Susanna, daughter of Thomas Barnard of Jamaica.

He was educated at Lincoln's Inn and called to the bar in 1773. He then lived in the Inn, practicing law there and on the Northern Circuit.

In 1794, he was elected on the interest of his first cousin, the 5th Duke of Argyll as the Member of Parliament (MP) for Ayr Burghs. He made little impact in Westminster, but held the seat until he stood down at the 1807 general election.

He was Master in Chancery from 1801 to 1819, and accountant general from 1819 to 1826. After leaving Parliament, he resumed legal practice in the South of England.

Campbell married twice, and had 4 daughters. In 1802 he succeeded to the states of his older brother William Henry.

Parliament of Great Britain
Preceded by Charles Stuart	Member of Parliament for Ayr Burghs; 1794–1800	Succeeded by Parliament of the United Kingdom
Parliament of the United Kingdom
Preceded by Parliament of Great Britain	Member of Parliament for Ayr Burghs; 1801–1807	Succeeded by John Campbell
