= James Wildman =

English politician (1747–1816)

James Wildman (20 March 1747 – 23 March 1816) was a British politician and the Member of Parliament for Hindon from 1796 to 1802.

== See also ==
- List of MPs in the first United Kingdom Parliament
