= John Webb (died 1795) =

English politician

John Webb (1730? – 4 February 1795) was an English politician.

He was the son of Nicholas Webb of Norton Court, near Gloucester and was a ship's husband (an agent appointed by the owner of a ship with the authority to make repairs and attend to the equipment of the ship when in home port) for the East India Company.

He was appointed sheriff of Gloucester for 1761–1762 and made mayor for 1770–1771, 1776–1777 and 1786–1787. He was a Member (MP) for Gloucester from 1780 to his death.

He married Arabella, the daughter of Thomas Bushell of Sevinbroke, Oxfordshire, with whom he had 2 sons and 3 daughters.
