= Francis Lloyd (died 1799) =

British politician (1748–1799)

Francis Lloyd (1748–1799), of Domgay, Llandysilio, Montgomeryshire, was a Welsh Member of Parliament.

He was a Member (MP) of the Parliament of Great Britain for Montgomeryshire 4 Apr. 1795 - 19 Feb. 1799.
