= Thomas Fane (died 1807) =

English politician

Member of Parliament for Lyme Regis
- In office 1784 – March 1806 Serving with Hon. Henry Fane (1784–1802); Henry Fane (1802–06)

Personal details
- Born: 1760
- Died: 15 April 1807 (aged 46–47)
- Children: John Thomas Fane

Thomas Fane (1760 – 15 April 1807) was an English politician in the 19th century. He was a Tory Member of Parliament for Lyme Regis from 1784 to 1806.

== See also ==
- List of MPs in the first United Kingdom Parliament
