= Benjamin Lester Lester =

British politician

Benjamin Lester Lester (1779 – 1838) was a British politician.

Lester was born in Poole and worked as a merchant, in the shipping trade with Newfoundland. He stood in an 1809 by-election in Poole, and won the seat as a Whig. He supported the abolition of slavery. He held his seat at each election until 1835, when he stood down.

In 1815, Lester served as Mayor of Poole.

Parliament of the United Kingdom
Preceded by Richard Bickerton; John Jeffery	Member of Parliament for Poole; 1809–1835; With: Michael Angelo Taylor (1812–1818); John Dent (1818–1826); William Ponsonby (1826–1831); John Byng (1831–1835)	Succeeded by John Byng; Charles Augustus Tulk
