= Charles Stuart (British Army officer, born 1753) =

British Army officer (1753–1801

Lieutenant-General the Honourable Sir Charles Stuart KB
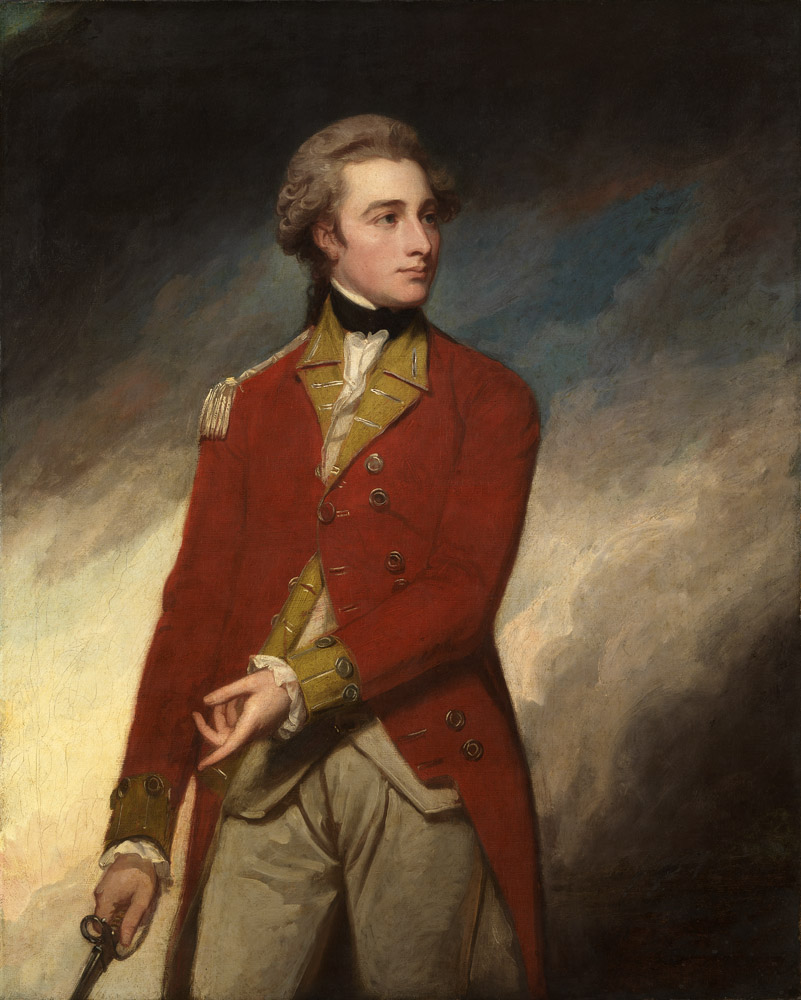
- Portrait by George Romney, 1779

Member of Parliament for Poole
- In office 1801–1801 Serving with John Jeffery
- Preceded by: Parliament of Great Britain
- Succeeded by: John Jeffery; George Garland

Member of the Great Britain Parliament for Poole
- In office 1796–1801 Serving with John Jeffery
- Preceded by: Benjamin Lester; Michael Angelo Taylor
- Succeeded by: Parliament of the United Kingdom
- In office 1790–1790 Serving with Benjamin Lester
- Preceded by: William Morton Pitt; Michael Angelo Taylor
- Succeeded by: Benjamin Lester; Michael Angelo Taylor

Governor of Menora
- In office 1798–1800
- Preceded by: Position established
- Succeeded by: Henry Edward Fox

Member of the Great Britain Parliament for Ayr Burghs
- In office 1790–1794
- Preceded by: Alexander Edmondstone
- Succeeded by: John Campbell

Member of the Great Britain Parliament for Bossiney
- In office 1776–1790 Serving with Henry Luttrell (1776–1778); Bamber Gascoyne (1784–1786); Matthew Montagu (1786–1790)
- Preceded by: John Stuart; Henry Luttrell
- Succeeded by: James Archibald Stuart; Humphrey Minchin
- Military career
- Born: January 1753; Kenwood House, London, England
- Died: 25 May 1801 (aged 48); Richmond Park, Surrey, England
- Spouse: Anne Louisa Bertie (m. 1778; died 1801)
- Allegiance: Great Britain; United Kingdom
- Branch: British Army
- Service years: 1768–1801
- Rank: Lieutenant-general
- Conflicts: American Revolutionary War; French Revolutionary Wars; Siege of Calvi; Capture of Minorca (1798)

Lieutenant-General Sir Charles Stuart KB (January 1753 – 25 May 1801) was a British Army officer and politician who served in the American War of Independence and French Revolutionary Wars.

== Early life ==
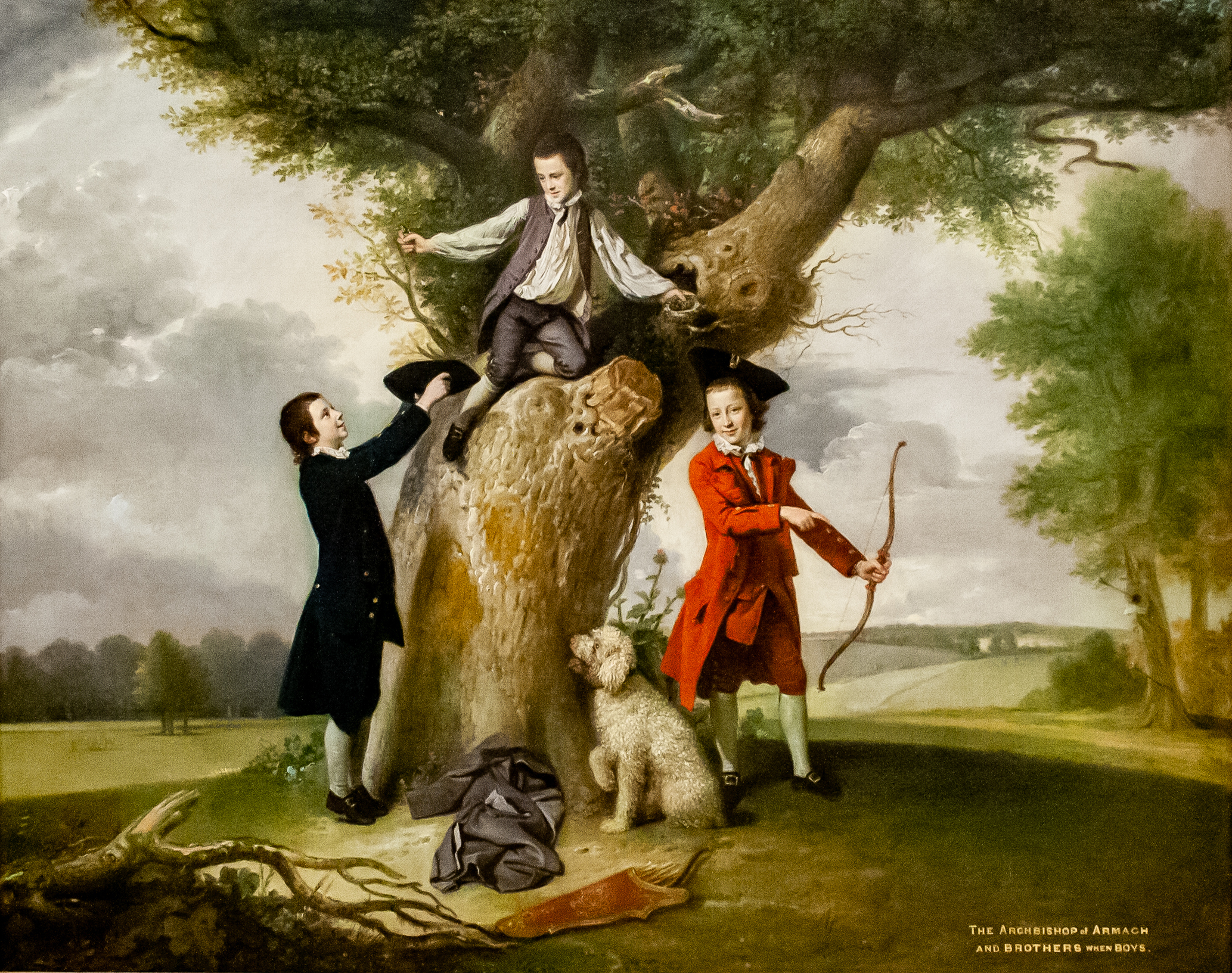
The Three Sons of the Earl of Bute (c. 1764). Stuart in on the tree at the painting's centre.

Stuart was born in Kenwood House, London in January 1753. He was the fourth son of the Prime Minister, John Stuart, 3rd Earl of Bute, and Mary Stuart, Countess of Bute, the only daughter of Sir Edward Wortley Montagu and Lady Mary Pierrepont (daughter of the 1st Duke of Kingston-upon-Hull).

He had several notable brothers and sisters, including John Stuart, 1st Marquess of Bute; The Most Rev. and Hon. William Stuart, a clergyman who became Archbishop of Armagh; and James Archibald Stuart, another soldier who raised the 92nd Foot in 1779. His sisters were Lady Louisa Stuart, a writer who died unmarried; Lady Mary Stuart, who married James Lowther, later the 1st Earl of Lonsdale; Lady Anne Stuart, who married Lord Warkworth, later the 2nd Duke of Northumberland; Lady Jane Stuart, who married George Macartney, later the first Earl Macartney; and Lady Caroline Stuart, who married The Hon. John Dawson, later first Earl of Portarlington.

== Career ==
Stuart embarked upon a military career in 1768, when he enlisted as an ensign in the 37th Regiment of Foot. He purchased a lieutenancy in the 7th Regiment of Foot (Royal Fusiliers) in 1770 and a captaincy in the 35th Foot in 1773. In October of that year, he became a major in the 43rd Regiment of Foot, and saw service in the American War of Independence. In October 1777, he was commissioned as a lieutenant-colonel of the 26th Regiment of Foot, which he commanded until 1779.

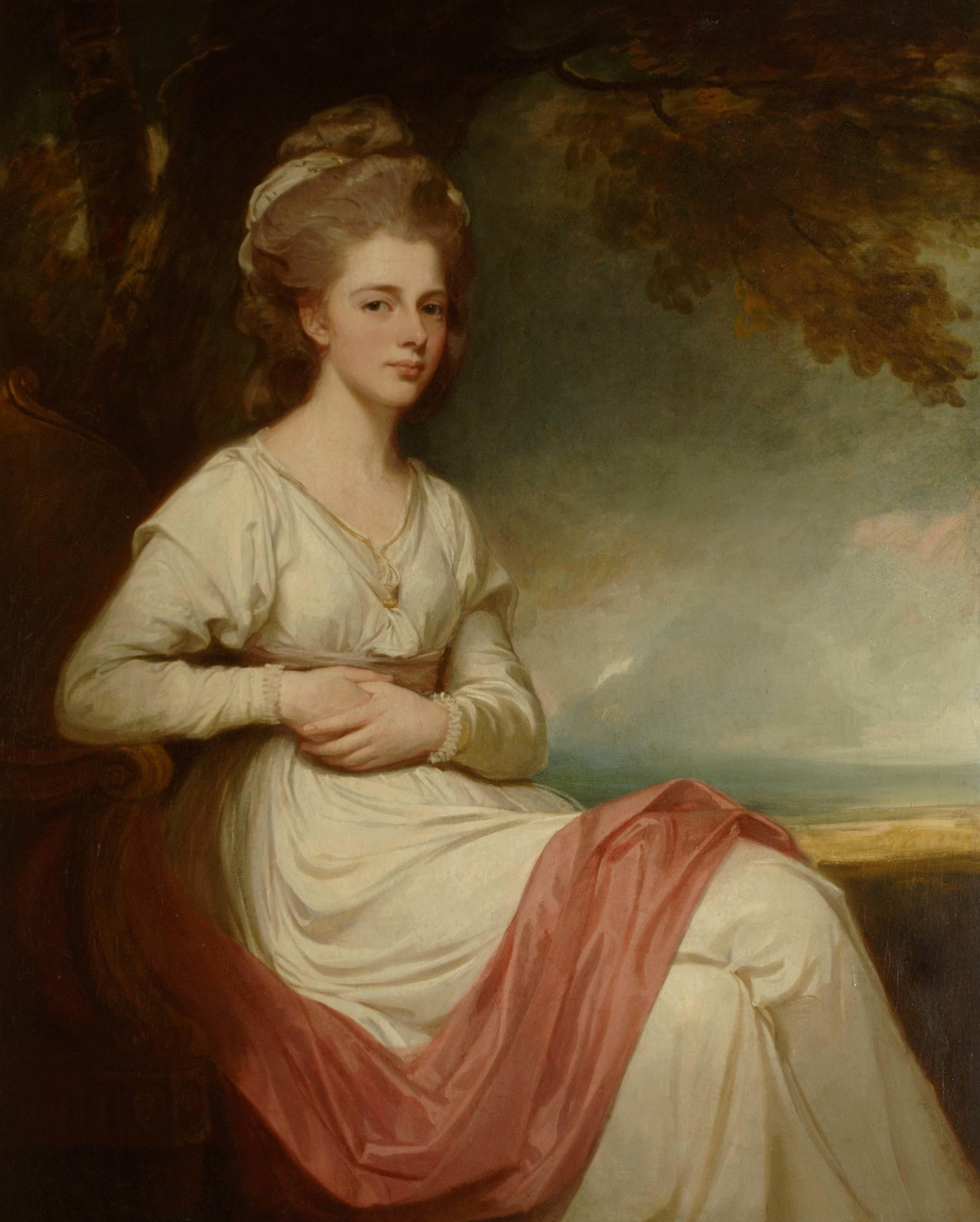
The Honourable Anne Louisa Bertie, Lady Stuart (1747-1841). Painting by George Romney, 1779-1780.

He returned briefly to America, before coming back to London as a liaison to the ministry. A harsh critic of the Army's conduct, he was, however, highly favored by Sir Henry Clinton, with whom he corresponded regularly. His two sons were born after his return from America.

He was promoted to colonel in 1782, but his criticisms and the disfavor of George III towards his father prevented further military commands. He had been elected MP for Bossiney in 1776, succeeding his elder brother Lord Mount Stuart, who had been created Baron Cardiff. Stuart continued an MP for the remainder of his life, except the years 1794–1796, but showed little interest in politics.

With the opening of hostilities against France by the First Coalition, he returned to active service. On 23 May 1794, he took command of the army in Corsica, and supervised the taking of Calvi (the action in which Horatio Nelson lost an eye). Colonel John Moore was at the time his adjutant general. Stuart was promoted to lieutenant-general for this action, and on 24 October 1794, was made colonel of the 68th Regiment of Foot. However, his pride and violent temper led him to quarrel with Lord Hood, commanding the Mediterranean Fleet, and with the civilian viceroy of Corsica, Sir Gilbert Elliot, Bt. His partiality for Pasquale Paoli against Elliot, and other conflicts, led Stuart to resign in February 1795. On 25 March 1795, he left the colonelcy of the 68th for that of the 26th Regiment of Foot, which he held for the remainder of his life.

=== Defence of Portugal ===
He took command of a force sent to Portugal in January 1797 to defend Lisbon, and was notably successful in instilling discipline and spirit into the force, which was partly foreign in composition.

=== Capture of Menorca ===
In 1798, he was sent to attack Menorca (historically called "Minorca" by the British) with 3,000 men, an appointment heartily approved by Lord St Vincent, who praised Stuart as an excellent general and inspiring leader of troops. Though unequipped with siege artillery, he successfully dissimulated and bluffed the Spaniards into surrendering the island without loss of life, an exploit for which he was made a Knight of the Bath. From 15 November 1798 until 1800, he served as the British governor of the island. In March 1799, he responded to an appeal by Admiral Nelson (who, like St Vincent, thought him an excellent leader), and brought the 30th and 89th Regiments under Colonel Blayney to Palermo, from whence they were dispatched to secure Messina against French invasion.

=== Later life ===
In April 1800 he resigned as governor of Menorca and returned to England. He was then offered the post of Commander-in-Chief, Ireland, but died at his home in Richmond Park on 25 March 1801 before he could accept.

An able general and administrator, Stuart's quarrelsome disposition and tendency toward insubordination blighted an otherwise promising military career.

== Personal life ==
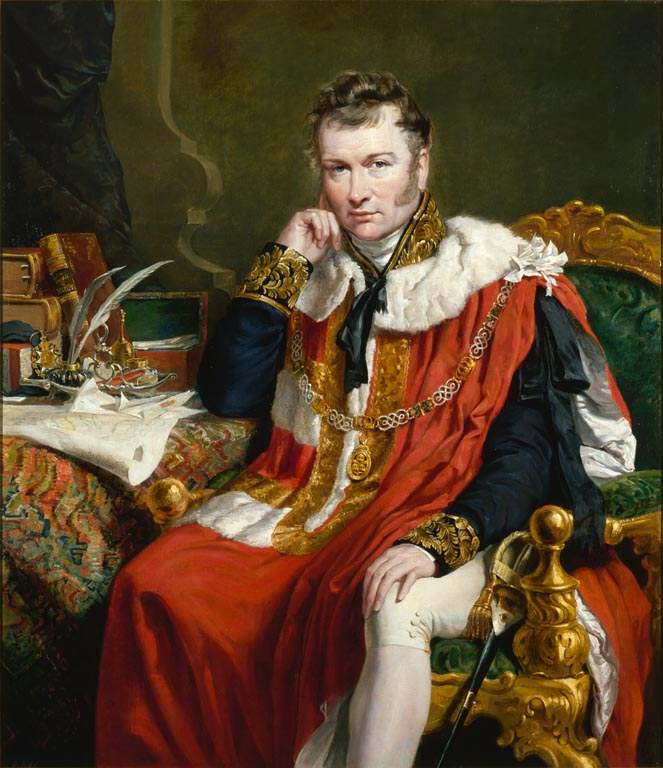
Portrait of his eldest son, Charles, by George Hayter, 1830

On 19 April 1778 while on a visit home to England, he married Anne Louisa Bertie (1747–1841), the younger daughter of Lord Vere Bertie (third son of the 1st Duke of Ancaster and Kesteven), and Anne Casey (the illegitimate daughter of Sir Cecil Wray, 11th Baronet). In 1792, on the death of his father, he inherited the estate of Highcliffe House in Hampshire. Together, they were the parents of two sons:

- Charles Stuart, 1st Baron Stuart de Rothesay (1779–1845), who married Lady Elizabeth Margaret Yorke, a daughter of Philip Yorke, 3rd Earl of Hardwicke and Lady Elizabeth Lindsay (a daughter of the 5th Earl of Balcarres), in 1816.
- Capt. John James Stuart (1782–1811), who died aboard his command, the frigate HMS Saldanha; he married Albinia Sullivan, a daughter of Rt. Hon. John Sullivan and Lady Henrietta Hobart (a daughter of the 3rd Earl of Buckinghamshire).

Stuart died at his home in Richmond Park on 25 March 1801. He was buried in the family vault at St Peter's Church, Petersham. There are monuments to Stuart in Westminster Abbey, this by Joseph Nollekens, and in St Peter's Church.

=== Descendants ===
Through his eldest son Charles, he was a grandfather of Hon. Charlotte Stuart, who married Charles Canning, 1st Earl Canning, and Hon. Louisa Anne Stuart, who married Henry Beresford, 3rd Marquess of Waterford.

Through his second son John James, he was a grandfather of Gen. Charles Stuart (1810–1892), was British Army general and MP.

Parliament of Great Britain
Preceded by Lord Mount Stuart; Henry Luttrell	Member of Parliament for Bossiney; 1776–1790; With: Henry Luttrell 1776–1784; Bamber Gascoyne 1784–1786; Matthew Montagu 1786–1790	Succeeded by James Archibald Stuart; Humphrey Minchin
Preceded by William Morton Pitt; Michael Angelo Taylor	Member of Parliament for Poole; 1790; With: Benjamin Lester	Succeeded by Benjamin Lester; Michael Angelo Taylor
Preceded by Alexander Edmondstone	Member of Parliament for Ayr Burghs; 1790–1794	Succeeded by John Campbell
Preceded by Benjamin Lester; Michael Angelo Taylor	Member of Parliament for Poole; 1796–1801; With: John Jeffery	Succeeded by Parliament of the United Kingdom
Parliament of the United Kingdom
Preceded by Parliament of Great Britain	Member of Parliament for Poole; 1801; With: John Jeffery	Succeeded by John Jeffery; George Garland
Political offices
New title	Governor of Menorca; 1798–1800	Succeeded by Henry Edward Fox
Military offices
Preceded by Sir Alured Clarke	Colonel of the 68th (Durham) Regiment of Foot; 1794–1795	Succeeded by Thomas Trigge
Preceded by Sir William Erskine	Colonel of the 26th (The Cameronian) Regiment of Foot; 1795–1801	Succeeded by Andrew Gordon
