= Thomas Ridge (MP) =

Thomas Ridge (c. 1671–1730), of Portsmouth, Hampshire, was a British brewer, merchant and Whig politician who sat in the House of Commons between 1708 and 1727.

Ridge was the son of Richard Ridge, a brewer of Portsmouth, and his wife Jane Fox of St. Margaret's, Westminster, Middlesex. His father had served the town both as alderman and mayor. In 1691, Ridge inherited his father's business, including cooperage works and malthouses. He took part in a number of trading and fishing ventures in the 1690s with London merchants, On 6 January 1697, he married Elizabeth Ayles, daughter of Humphrey Ayles of St Botolph's, Aldgate. At Portsmouth, he became one of the main contractors supplying beer and casks to the navy. The trade had increased because of the French wars and Portsmouth became the base for the main fleet. Ridge's business interests made him one of the most prominent townsmen and he hosted the Queen of Portugal when she visited Portsmouth in 1708.

At the 1708 British general election Ridge was put up for Parliament at Poole by the local Whigs, with the support of the 2nd Duke of Bolton. He was returned as Member of Parliament, but was not particularly active in the Commons. He showed his Whig views by voting for naturalizing the Palatines in 1709 and for the impeachment of Dr Sacheverell in 1710. He became involved in the longstanding political infighting at Portsmouth. He was one of a number of Whig aldermen enrolled in 1709, but in 1710, following a writ of quo warranto, was turned off the aldermen's bench. At the 1710 British general election he was again returned as MP for Poole. With the change of administration in Parliament, the ‘worthy patriots’ of the Tory Party investigated the mismanagements of the previous ministry and uncovered irregularities in the activities of brewers supplying the navy, including Ridge, and found frauds amounting to £55,435. The committee presented its report to the House which passed a resolution that Ridge was guilty of ‘notorious embezzlements and scandalous abuses’ and he was accordingly expelled from the House of Commons on 15 February 1711. In the intervening years he managed his businesses in Portsmouth and invested in privateering ventures.

Ridge did not stand for Parliament again until 1722 when he was returned unopposed as Whig MP for Poole. He did not stand in 1727.

Ridge died on 10 February 1730, leaving five sons and a daughter, and was buried at Portsmouth. His eldest son, Thomas was left the brewing stores, buildings and equipment, while his other children were given the rest of his real estate, including tenements in Portsmouth and farms in Sussex and Hampshire.

Parliament of Great Britain
Preceded by Samuel Weston; Sir William Phippard	Member of Parliament for Poole; 1708– 1711; With: Sir William Lewen 1708-1710; Sir William Phippard 1710-1711	Succeeded by Sir William Phippard; Sir William Lewen
Preceded by George Trenchard; Sir William Lewen	Member of Parliament for Poole; 1722–1727; With: George Trenchard	Succeeded by George Trenchard; Denis Bond
