= William Lewen =

British merchant and politician (c.1657–1722)

Sir William Lewen (c. 1657 – 1722), of Ewell, Surrey, was a British merchant and Tory politician who sat in the House of Commons between 1708 and 1722. He was Lord Mayor of London in 1717.

== Early life ==
Lewen was the second son of Robert Lewen of Wimborne Minster, Dorset. His elder brother George set up as a merchant at Poole, while he himself went to London where he became a wine importer. He was a member of the Haberdashers Company. He married Susannah Taylor daughter of Robert Taylor, vintner of the Devil Tavern and of Turnham Green, Middlesex, on 30 July 1685.

== Career ==
By 1696, Lewen was deputy-governor of the Royal Lustring Company. which dealt in a particular type of silk which was associated with the Huguenots. In January 1698 he received a royal pardon for trading with France during the war. Although the company was given a Royal Charter in 1698, its fortunes declined with changing fashions.

Lewen was Common Councillor for Billingsgate from 1700 to 1703. By 1706 he was living at Ewell and subsequently purchased an estate there. In December 1707 he tried to become an Alderman but was unsuccessful. However; next year in 1708, he was elected Alderman for Castle Baynard, remaining for the rest of his life. At the 1708 general election, he was returned as Member of Parliament for Poole, when his brother was mayor there. He became Master of the Haberdashers in 1709 but was one of the unsuccessful Tory candidates for a directorship of the East India Company. He voted against the impeachment of Dr Sacheverell in 1710.

Although Lewen did not stand for Poole at the 1710 general election, he was returned at a by-election on 7 March 1711. He was a Colonel in the Blue Regiment of the City Militia from 1711 to 1714 and was Sheriff of London for the year 1712 to 1713. He was knighted on 17 December 1712. In Parliament, he voted against the ministry over the French commerce bill on 18 June 1713. He was returned unopposed as Tory MP for Poole at the general elections of 1713 and 1715.

== Death and legacy ==
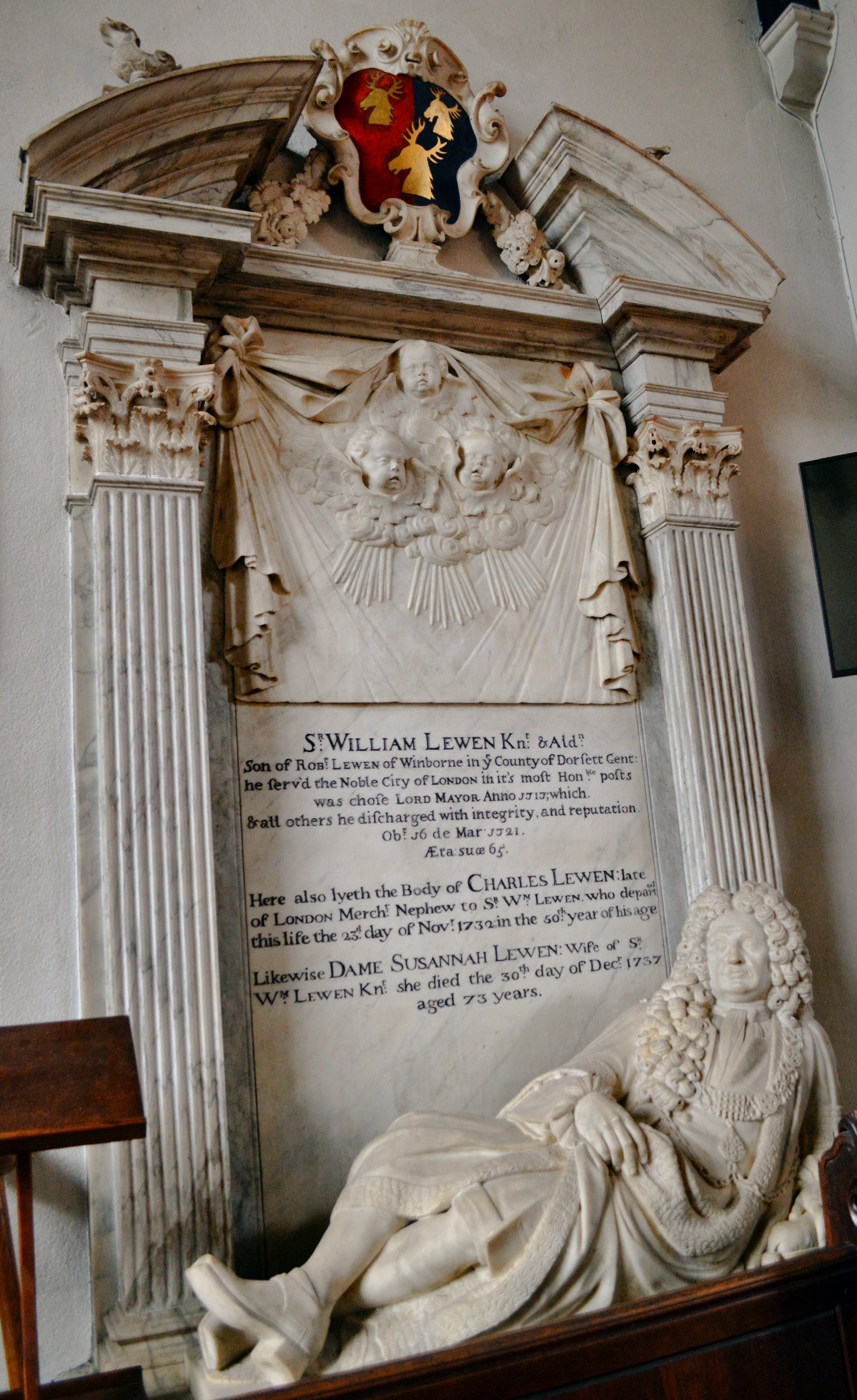
St Mary's Church, Ewell

Lewen died without issue on 16 March 1722, shortly after Parliament was dissolved and was buried at St Mary Ewell. His heir was his nephew George Lewen. His wife Susannah died in 1737.

Parliament of Great Britain
Preceded by Samuel Weston; Sir William Phippard	Member of Parliament for Poole; 1708–1710; With: Thomas Ridge	Succeeded by Sir William Phippard; Thomas Ridge
Preceded by Sir William Phippard; Thomas Ridge	Member of Parliament for Poole; 1711–1722; With: Sir William Phippard; George Trenchard 1713	Succeeded by George Trenchard; Thomas Ridge
Civic offices
Preceded by Sir James Bateman	Lord Mayor of London; 1717-1718	Succeeded by John Ward
