= George Garland (MP) =

British politician (1753–1825)

George Garland (1753 – 28 December 1825) of Purbeck, Dorset was an English politician and merchant involved in the Newfoundland fishery.

== Life and work ==
He was born in East Lulworth, Dorset, the son of a yeoman farmer. In 1779, Garland married Amy Lester, the daughter of Benjamin Lester, who was involved in the fish trade, and became the manager for Lester's counting house in Poole. After his father-in-law's death in 1802, Garland took over the operation of the business. Following the death of Lester's son John in 1805, the company was named George Garland and Sons. His sons John Bingley and George were sent to Trinity to look after the operation of the fishery.

Garland served as mayor of Poole in 1788 and 1810 and was the Member of Parliament for Poole from 1801 to 1806. He was High Sheriff of Dorset for 1824/25.

He passed control of the business to his sons in 1822 but remained involved until his death in 1825. He and his wife had 8 sons and 3 daughters. His eldest son Benjamin Lester took the name Benjamin Lester Lester to comply with the terms of his grandfather's will; he served in the British House of Commons but took no interest in the Newfoundland fishery.

Parliament of the United Kingdom
Preceded by Hon. Charles Stuart; John Jeffery	Member of Parliament for Poole; 1801–1808; With: John Jeffery	Succeeded by Sir Richard Bickerton, Bt; John Jeffery
