= Michael Angelo Taylor =

English politician (1757–1834)

Michael Angelo Taylor (1757 – 16 July 1834) was an English politician and MP for Poole. He favoured parliamentary reform and was made a privy councillor in 1831.

== Life ==
He was a son of Sir Robert Taylor (1714–1788), the architect, and his wife Elizabeth, and was educated at Corpus Christi College, Oxford, becoming a barrister at Lincoln's Inn in 1774. He entered the House of Commons as Member of Parliament (MP) for Poole in 1784, and, with the exception of the short period from 1802 to 1806, remained a member of parliament until 1834, although not as the representative of the same constituency.

In Parliament Taylor showed himself anxious to curtail the delays in the Court of Chancery, and to improve the lighting and paving of the London streets; and he was largely instrumental in bringing about the abolition of the pillory. At first a supporter of the younger Pitt, he soon veered round to the side of Fox and the Whigs, favoured parliamentary reform, and was a personal friend of the regent, afterwards King George IV. He was on the committee which managed the Impeachment of Warren Hastings; was made a privy councillor in 1831; and died in London in July 1834.

Taylor is chiefly known in connection with the Metropolitan Paving Act 1817, which is still referred to as "Michael Angelo Taylor's Act". Often called "Chicken Taylor" because of his reference to himself as a "mere chicken in the law," he is described by Sir Spencer Walpole as "a pompous barrister, with a little body and a loud voice."

Michael Angelo challenged a codicil to his father's will, left unsigned when Sir Robert died in 1788, by means of which Sir Robert intended to gift £65,000 to the University of Oxford. The university did not receive the money, with which it built the Taylor Institution, until 1835, a year after Michael Angelo's own death.

== Notes ==
Parliament of Great Britain
| Preceded by Joseph Gulston; William Morton Pitt | Member of Parliament for Poole; 1784–1790; With: William Morton Pitt | Succeeded by Charles Stuart; Benjamin Lester |
| Preceded by William à Court; William Eden | Member of Parliament for Heytesbury; Dec 1790 – Mar 1791; With: William Eden | Succeeded by Earl of Barrymore; William Eden |
| Preceded by Charles Stuart; Benjamin Lester | Member of Parliament for Poole; 1791–1796; With: Benjamin Lester | Succeeded by Charles Stuart; Benjamin Lester |
| Preceded by Thomas Grenville; Lord Grey of Gorby | Member of Parliament for Aldeburgh; 1796–1800; With: Sir John Aubrey, Bt | Succeeded by George Johnstone; Sir John Aubrey, Bt |
| Preceded by Sir Henry Vane-Tempest, Bt; Ralph Lambton | Member of Parliament for City of Durham; March 1800 – Dec 1800; With: Ralph Lambton | Succeeded by Parliament of the United Kingdom |
Parliament of the United Kingdom
| Preceded by Parliament of Great Britain | Member of Parliament for City of Durham; 1801–1802; With: Ralph Lambton | Succeeded by Richard Wharton; Ralph Lambton |
| Preceded by Sir Arthur Wellesley; Sir Charles Talbot, Bt | Member of Parliament for Rye; 1806–1807; With: Patrick Crauford Bruce | Succeeded by Earl of Clancarty; Sir John Nicholl |
| Preceded by Nathaniel Saxon; Sir William Manners, Bt | Member of Parliament for Ilchester; 1807–1812; With: Richard Brinsley Sheridan | Succeeded by Hon. John Ward; George Philips |
| Preceded by Sir Richard Bickerton, Bt; Benjamin Lester | Member of Parliament for Poole; 1812–1818; With: Benjamin Lester | Succeeded by John Dent; Benjamin Lester |
| Preceded by Richard Wharton; George Allan | Member of Parliament for City of Durham; 1818–1831; With: Richard Wharton to 1820; Sir Henry Hardinge 1820–30; Sir Roger Gresley, Bt 1830–31; William Chaytor from 1831 | Succeeded by Arthur Trevor; William Chaytor |
| Preceded by Digby Cayley Wrangham; Sir John Walsh, Bt | Member of Parliament for Sudbury; 1832–1834; With: Sir John Walsh, Bt | Succeeded by Sir John Walsh, Bt; Sr Edward Barnes |
