= George Trenchard (MP for Poole) =

British landowner and Whig politician

George Trenchard (c. 1684–1758), of Lytchett Matravers, near Poole, Dorset, was a British landowner and Whig politician who sat in the House of Commons for 35 years between 1713 and 1754.

== Life ==
Trenchard was the eldest son of Sir John Trenchard and his wife Philippa Speke, daughter of George Speke of White Lackington, Somerset. He joined the army and was an ensign in the Earl of Monmouth's Foot in 1693. In 1695 he succeeded to the estates of his father and joined Colonel Henry Mordaunt's Foot. He left the army by 1702 when he was admitted at Middle Temple on 21 April 1702. He was admitted at Jesus College, Cambridge on 12 May 1705.

By 1712 Trenchard had become a friend of Thomas Burnet, a Whig pamphleteer, and stood bail for Burnet when he was prosecuted in 1713 for publishing the anti-ministerial pamphlet A Certain Information of a Certain Discourse. Trenchard was returned as Member of Parliament for Poole on his own interest at the 1713 British general election. He voted against the expulsion of Richard Steele on 18 March 1714, and was classed as a Whig.

Trenchard was returned again as Whig MP for Poole at the 1715 British general election. Thereafter, he voted consistently with the Administration, except on the Peerage Bill in 1719. He was appointed vice.-admiral of Poole and Dorset in 1716. His only known speech was, in the committee on the South Sea sufferers bill, on 2 June 1721, when he moved that Sir Theodore Janssen be allowed to keep £50,000 from his estate. He was returned again for Poole in 1722, 1727 and 1734. At the 1741 British general election he chose to stand with Thomas Wyndham, but it turned out that the Corporation were not prepared to support them, and he did not proceed to the poll. He was returned again unopposed at the 1747 British general election with a different running mate.. Before the 1754 British general election he gave his interest at Poole to Sir Richard Lyttelton, on condition that his son John Trenchard should be made a commissioner of taxes.

Trenchard died on 31 March 1758.

== Family ==
Trenchard married his cousin Mary Trenchard (died 1740), daughter of Thomas Trenchard, She was the heiress of Wolveton, Dorset, which, combined with the property he had inherited from his father, made Trenchard a substantial landowner in Dorset. Of their six sons and five daughters, three each predeceased their father.

Parliament of Great Britain
Preceded by Sir William Phippard; Sir William Lewen	Member of Parliament for Poole; 1713–1741; With: Sir William Lewen; Thomas Ridge; Denis Bond; Thomas Wyndham	Succeeded by Joseph Gulston; Thomas Missing
Preceded by Joseph Gulston; Thomas Missing	Member of Parliament for Poole; 1747–1754; With: Joseph Gulston	Succeeded by Joseph Gulston; Sir Richard Lyttelton
