= John Byng, 1st Earl of Strafford =

British soldier and politician (1772–1860)

Field Marshal The Right Honourable The Earl of Strafford GCB GCH PC (Ire)
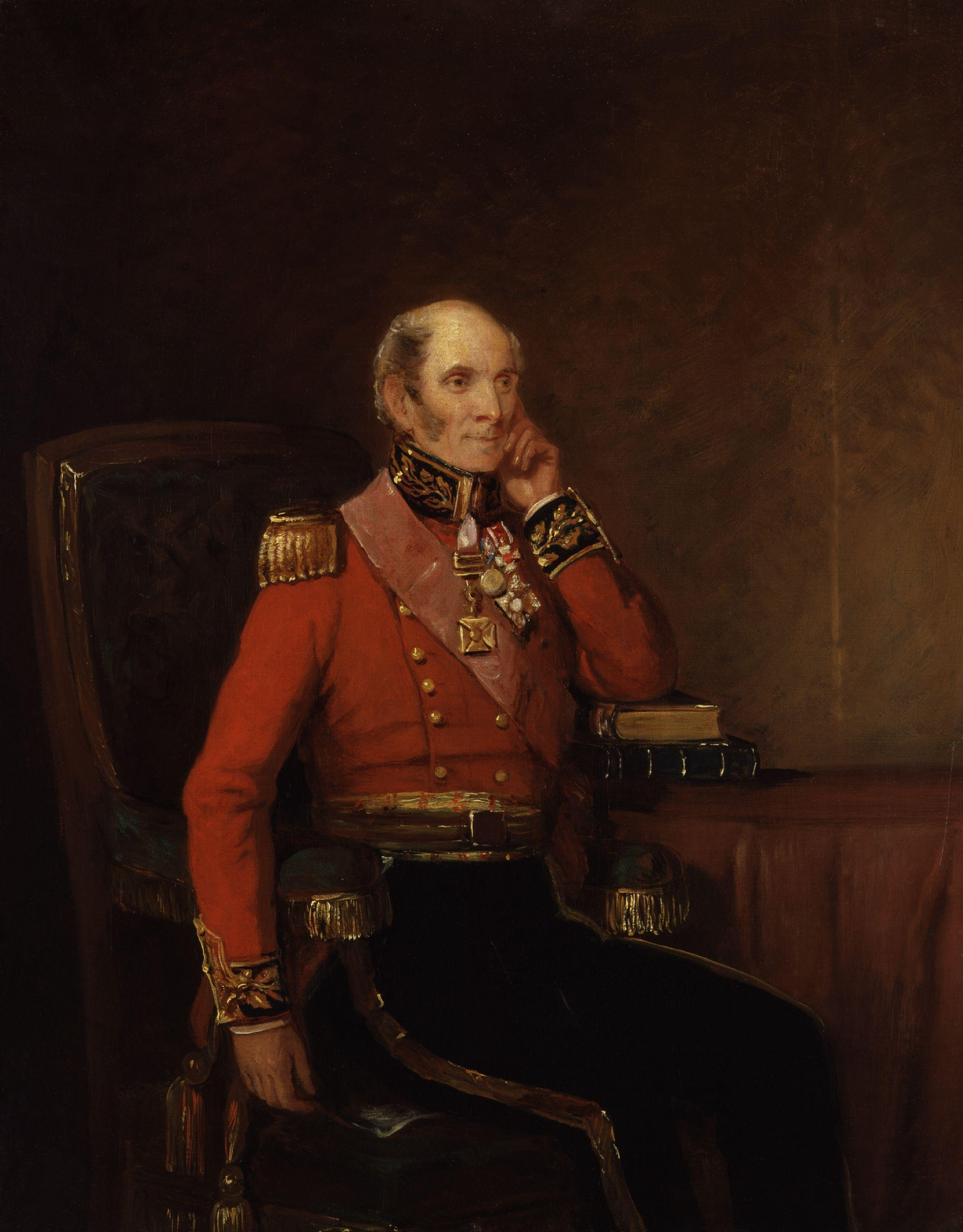
- Portrait by William Salter, 1834–1840
- Born: 1772; Berkeley Square, London
- Died: 3 June 1860 (aged 87 or 88); Grosvenor Square, London
- Children: 5, including George
- Military career
- Allegiance: United Kingdom
- Branch: British Army
- Service years: 1793–1831
- Rank: Field Marshal
- Commands: Grenadier Bn 3rd Regiment of Foot Guards; 2nd Guards Brigade; Northern District; Commander-in-Chief, Ireland
- Conflicts: French Revolutionary Wars; Irish Rebellion of 1798; Napoleonic Wars
- Awards: Knight Grand Cross of the Order of the Bath; Knight Grand Cross of the Royal Guelphic Order

Arms of John Byng, 1st Earl of Strafford, being his paternal arms of Byng (Quarterly sable and argent in the first quarter a lion rampant of the second), with augmentation of honour granted in 1815 by the Prince Regent of in bend sinister a representation of the colour of the 31st Regiment of Foot, in recognition of his heroic action at the Battle of the Nive

Field Marshal John Byng, 1st Earl of Strafford GCB, GCH, PC (Ire) (1772 – 3 June 1860) was a British Army officer and politician. After serving as a junior officer during the French Revolutionary Wars and Irish Rebellion of 1798, he became Commanding Officer of the Grenadier Battalion of the 3rd Regiment of Foot Guards during the disastrous Walcheren Campaign. He served as a brigade commander at the Battle of Vitoria and then at the Battle of Roncesvalles on 25 July 1813 when his brigade took the brunt of the French assault and held its position for three hours in the early morning before finally being forced back.

During the Hundred Days, he commanded the 2nd Guards Brigade at the Battle of Quatre Bras in June 1815 and again at the Battle of Waterloo later that month when light companies from his brigade played an important role in the defence of Château d'Hougoumont. He went on to be Commander-in-Chief, Ireland and, after leaving Ireland in 1831, he was elected as Whig Member of Parliament for Poole in Dorset and was one of the few military men who supported the Reform Bill, for which he was rewarded with a peerage.

== Origins ==
He was the third son of George Byng (1735–1789) of Wrotham Park in Middlesex (now in Hertfordshire) (eldest son of Robert Byng (1703–1740), Governor of Barbados) by his wife Anne Conolly, whose mother was a daughter of Thomas Wentworth, 1st Earl of Strafford (1672–1739), (of the second creation of that title). His great-grandfather was Admiral George Byng, 1st Viscount Torrington (1663–1733) of Southill Park in Bedfordshire.

== Career ==
=== Early promotions ===
He was educated at Westminster School. He was commissioned as an ensign in the 33rd Regiment of Foot ("Duke of Wellington's Regiment") on 30 September 1793 and was promoted to lieutenant on 1 December 1793 and to captain on 27 December 1794. He was sent to the Netherlands later that year where he was wounded during a skirmish at Geldermalsen in January 1795 during the Flanders Campaign.

In 1796, Byng became aide-de-camp to General Richard Vyse in the Southern District of Ireland and was wounded during the Irish Rebellion of 1798. He became a major in the 60th Regiment of Foot on 28 December 1799 and a lieutenant-colonel in the 29th Regiment of Foot on 18 March 1800. He transferred to the 3rd Regiment of Foot Guards on 11 August 1804 and took part in the expedition to Hanover in 1805, in the Battle of Copenhagen in August 1807 and, having taken command of the Grenadier Battalion of his Regiment, in the disastrous Walcheren Campaign in Autumn 1809.

=== Napoleonic Wars ===
Promoted to colonel on 25 July 1810, Byng went to Spain in September 1811 to become Commander of a brigade serving under General Rowland Hill. Promoted to major-general on 4 June 1813, Byng commanded his brigade at the Battle of Vitoria in June 1813 and then at the Battle of Roncesvalles on 25 July 1813 when his brigade took the brunt of the French assault and held its position for three hours in the early morning before finally being forced back; meanwhile General Lowry Cole rushed up reinforcements in the early afternoon and then fended off the French until the evening when thick fog rolled in. Byng's stubborn resistance at Roncesvalles allowed the Marquess of Wellington (later the Duke) to consolidate enough troops to defeat the French at the Battle of the Pyrenees over the next few days.

=== Battle of the Nive ===
Byng also fought at the Battle of Nivelle in November 1813 and then at the Battle of the Nive in December 1813; at the latter battle, he led his troops up a hill under fire, occupied it and then planted the colour of the 31st Regiment of Foot there before driving the French troops down the hill. His conduct was such that the Prince Regent told him that he was

"permitted to wear over the arms of the family of Byng, in bend sinister, a representation of the colour of the 31st Regiment of Foot," and the following crest of honourable augmentation: "out of a mural crown an arm embowed, grasping the colour of the aforesaid 31st regiment, and pendent from the wrist by a ribband the gold cross presented to him by His Majesty's command, as a mark of His royal approbation of his distinguished services".

=== Waterloo ===
Byng went on to fight at the Battle of Orthez in February 1814 and at the Battle of Toulouse in April 1814. During the Hundred Days he commanded the 2nd Guards Brigade at the Battle of Quatre Bras in June 1815 and again at the Battle of Waterloo later that month when light companies from his brigade played an important role in the defence of Hougoumont. After the battle he was placed in command of the I Corps, and took part in the advance on Paris. Having captured the Péronne and its fortress, the Corps went on to occupy the heights of Montmartre and then to form part of the Army of Occupation. He was appointed a Knight Commander of the Order of the Bath on 2 January 1815 and a Knight of the Austrian Military Order of Maria Theresa on 8 October 1815.

=== Ireland and politics ===
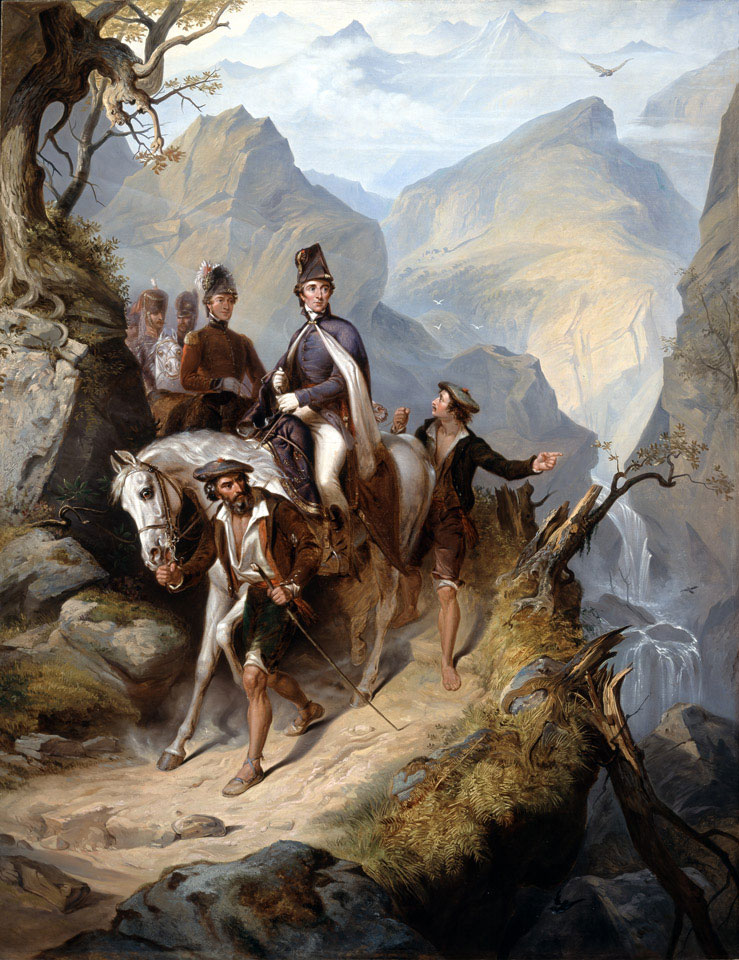
Wellington at Sorauren by Thomas Jones Barker. The Battle of the Pyrenees: Byng's stubborn resistance at Roncesvalles allowed the Viscount Wellington (shown on horseback in the painting) to consolidate enough troops to defeat the French at the Battle of the Pyrenees

Byng became General Officer Commanding the Eastern District in England in October 1815 before transferring to be General Officer Commanding the Northern District in England in June 1816. At the Peterloo Massacre of 1819, he was absent because he had two horses entered at York races that day, and delegated command to his deputy, who failed to peacefully disperse the large crowd, resulting in 18 deaths and hundreds of injuries. Promoted to lieutenant general on 27 May 1825, he was advanced to Knight Grand Cross of the Order of the Bath in 1828. He became Commander-in-Chief, Ireland and was admitted to the Privy Council of Ireland later that year. After leaving Ireland, he was elected as a Whig Member of Parliament for Poole in Dorset in October 1831 and was one of the few military men who supported the Reform Bill of 1832. He was also appointed to the honorary position of Governor of Londonderry and Culmore on 15 June 1832. In recognition of Byng's support for the Reform Bill, the Prime Minister, Lord Melbourne, raised him to the peerage as Baron Strafford of Harmondsworth on 8 May 1835, which territorial designation recognised the Earldom borne by his maternal ancestors which had become extinct in 1799. He was promoted to full general on 23 November 1841, and on 28 August 1847 he was raised further in the peerage as Viscount Enfield and Earl of Strafford. Also in 1847, following the death of his eldest brother the Whig MP George Byng (1764–1847), he inherited Wrotham Park.

Byng also served as honorary colonel of the 4th West India Regiment, as honorary colonel of the 2nd West India Regiment and as honorary colonel of the 29th Regiment of Foot; in his final years he was also honorary colonel of the Coldstream Guards. He was promoted to field marshal on 2 October 1855 and died at his home in Grosvenor Square in London on 3 June 1860.

== Family ==
Byng married twice:

- Firstly in 1804 to Mary Mackenzie, by whom he had one son:
  - George Stevens Byng, 2nd Earl of Strafford (1806–1886), eldest son and heir.
- Secondly, following the death of his first wife, he married Marianne James, a daughter of Sir Walter James James, by whom he had a further son and three daughters.

Byng was the grandfather of First World War general Julian Byng, 1st Viscount Byng of Vimy.

== Sources ==
- Chandler, David (1979). Dictionary of the Napoleonic Wars. New York: Macmillan. ISBN 0-02-523670-9.
- Heathcote, Tony (1999). The British Field Marshals, 1736–1997: A Biographical Dictionary. Barnsley: Leo Cooper. ISBN 0-85052-696-5.
- Reid, Robert (1989). The Peterloo Massacre. William Heinemann. ISBN 978-0-434-62901-5.
- Siborne, William (1848). The Waterloo Campaign, 1815 (4th ed.). Westminster: A. Constable.

Military offices
| Preceded by Sir Lowry Cole | GOC Northern District; 1816–1828 | Succeeded by Sir Henry Bouverie |
| Preceded by Sir George Murray | Commander-in-Chief, Ireland; 1828–1831 | Succeeded by The Lord Vivian |
| Preceded by George Vaughan Hart | Governor of Londonderry; 1832–1860 | Office abolished |
| Preceded by Sir Alexander Campbell | Colonel of the York Light Infantry Volunteers; 1815–1816 | Regiment disbanded |
| Preceded by Sir James Leith | Colonel of the 4th West India Regiment; 1816–1819 | Regiment disbanded |
| Preceded by Sir Henry Torrens | Colonel of the 2nd West India Regiment; 1822–1828 | Succeeded by Francis Fuller |
| Preceded by Gordon Forbes | Colonel of the 29th Regiment of Foot; 1828–1850 | Succeeded by The Lord Downes |
Parliament of the United Kingdom
| Preceded by Benjamin Lester; Hon. William Ponsonby | Member of Parliament for Poole; 1831–1835; Served alongside: Benjamin Lester 1831–1835; Charles Tulk 1835 | Succeeded by Charles Tulk; George Byng |
| Preceded by The Duke of Cambridge | Colonel of the Coldstream Guards; 1850–1860 | Succeeded by The Lord Clyde |
Peerage of the United Kingdom
| New creation | Earl of Strafford; 3rd creation 1847–1860 | Succeeded by George Byng |
| New creation | Baron Strafford descended by acceleration 1835–1853 | Succeeded by George Byng |
