= Sir Richard Bickerton, 2nd Baronet =

Royal Navy Admiral (1759–1832)

Admiral Sir Richard Hussey Bickerton Bt KCB
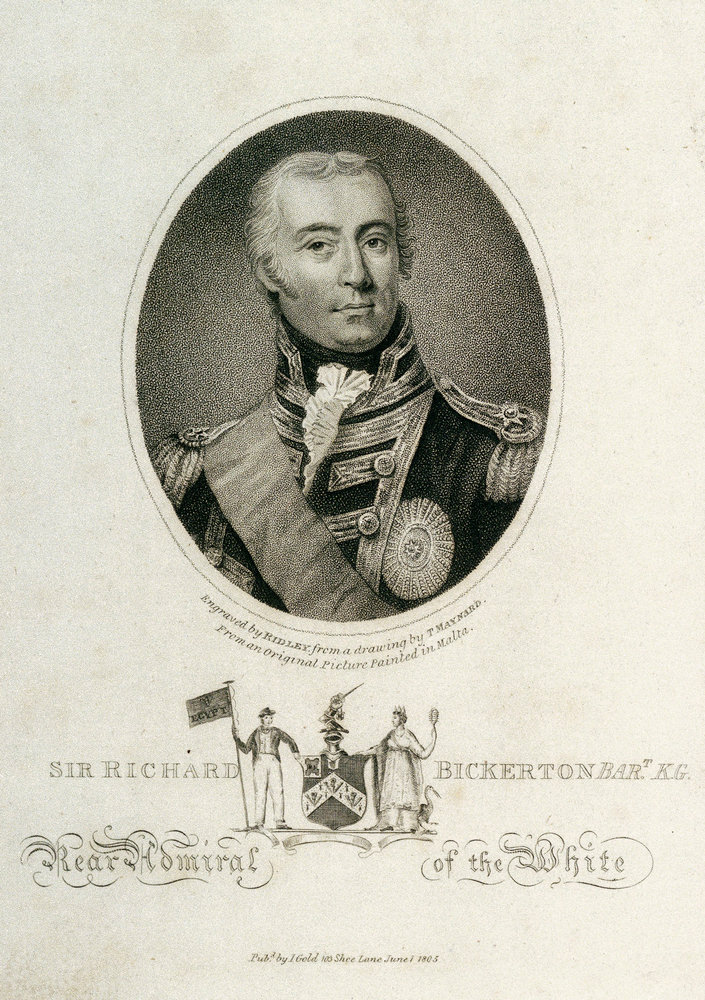
- 1805 portrait
- Born: 11 October 1759; Southampton, Hampshire, England
- Died: 9 February 1832 (aged 72); Bath, Somerset, England
- Burial place: Bath Abbey
- Relatives: Father: Sir Richard Bickerton, 1st Baronet
- Military career
- Allegiance: Great Britain; United Kingdom
- Branch: Royal Navy
- Service years: 1771–1815
- Rank: Admiral
- Commands: HMS Invincible; HMS Russell; HMS Terrible; HMS Amazon; HMS Brune; HMS Sibyl; HMS Ruby; HMS Ramillies; HMS Terrible; Portsmouth Command
- Conflicts: American War of Independence; Fourth Anglo-Dutch War; French Revolutionary Wars; Napoleonic Wars
- Awards: Knight Commander of the Order of the Bath

Admiral Sir Richard Hussey Bickerton, 2nd Baronet, KCB (11 October 1759 – 9 February 1832) was a senior Royal Navy officer who served in the American War of Independence, Fourth Anglo-Dutch War, and the French Revolutionary and Napoleonic Wars.

== Personal life ==
Richard Bickerton Junior was born in Southampton on 11 October 1759, the only surviving son of Vice-Admiral Sir Richard Bickerton and Mary Anne Hussey.

On 25 September 1788, he married Anne, daughter of Dr. James Athill of Antigua. Bickerton succeeded his father as 2nd Baronet in 1792. He was elected a Fellow of the Royal Society in 1810. On 2 January 1815, Bickerton was made a Knight Commander of the Order of the Bath. When, in May 1823, he inherited the estate of Wood Walton, he began using his mother's maiden name, Hussey, before his own surname.

Bickerton and his wife were the godparents of Admiral Sir Edmund Lyons, 1st Baron Lyons, who consequently gave the surname Bickerton as a middle name to his children Richard Lyons, 1st Viscount Lyons, and Anne Theresa Bickerton Lyons, Baroness von Wurtzburg.

== Naval career ==
Bickerton joined the Royal Navy, aged 12, on 14 December 1771. He was entered in the muster of his father's ships, Marlborough and later Princess Augusta, but did not actually serve until June 1774, when he joined HMS Medway as a captain's servant. Subsequently, promoted to midshipman, he served under Captain William Affleck in the Mediterranean, returning home in 1777 on board Invincible, commanded by Hyde Parker.

=== Master and Commander ===
Bickerton was promoted to lieutenant on 16 December 1777 and served under Charles Middleton first on board the 90-gun HMS Prince George, then the seventy-four, Royal Oak in March 1778. In May, Bickerton joined HMS Jupiter in the Bay of Biscay, and when Charles Middleton was appointed comptroller of the navy, he recommended that Bickerton be appointed first lieutenant under the command of Francis Reynolds.

On 20 October Jupiter attacked the much larger French ship-of-the-line Triton, forcing her to retire; as a reward for his conduct, Bickerton, on Middleton's recommendation, was in March 1779, promoted master and given command of the sloop, HMS Swallow. Swallow spent just under two years in The Channel, cruising and undertaking escort duties. While on convoy duty during the Summer of 1779, Bickerton gave the order to disperse, having heard of the arrival of the combined Franco-Spanish fleet in The Channel. His prompt action allowed the convoy to escape. After assisting in the capture of a Dutch convoy, on 2 January 1780, Bickerton and his vessel were sent to the West Indies to join Rodney's squadron and subsequently take part in the capture of Sint Eustatius in 1781.

=== Post Captain ===
Rodney promoted Bickerton to the rank of post captain on 8 February 1781 and gave him temporary command of HMS Invincible. It was in her that Bickerton took part in the Battle of Fort Royal, an action fought on 29 April 1781, off the coast of Martinique. Bickerton acquired his own ship, HMS Russell, in May, before briefly transferring to Terrible but, finding her unfit, moved to the frigate, HMS Amazon, in July. (Note: Bickerton's entries in The Gentleman's Magazine, and Historical Chronicle, and the Oxford Dictionary of National Biography, have him in command of HMS Terrible at some point between Russell and Amazon. The latter was reviewed by Nicholas Tracy but Tracy's own book, Who's Who in Nelson's Navy, however, does not mention this brief command.) After service in the Leeward Islands and North American waters, Bickerton returned to England in Amazon, arriving in Portsmouth in February 1782. In September, Bickerton was given the newly repaired HMS Brune; she was decommissioned in May the following year and Bickerton was without a ship until January 1787, when he commissioned HMS Sibyl and in her sailed for the Leeward Islands once more.

=== French Revolutionary War ===
When France declared war in 1793, Bickerton was given command of HMS Ruby and served in her in The Channel until September 1794 when he moved to HMS Ramillies and joined Lord Howe in the Bay of Biscay. In October 1794 he transported General Sir John Vaughan to the West Indies, to succeed Lieutenant-general Sir Charles Grey as the Commander-in-chief of British land forces there. Bickerton remained on this station until July 1795, when he was sent to Newfoundland. Bickerton returned home in November 1795 where he joined Admiral Adam Duncan's fleet on blockade duty in the North Sea. Bickerton served under Duncan for the whole of the following year, then in 1797, he and his ship transferred to the Channel Fleet under Admiral Alexander Hood. In 1798, Bickerton took command of the new HMS Terrible, built in 1785 to replace the old Terrible, scuttled after the Battle of Chesapeake. Later in 1798, Bickerton was given the title of Colonel of Marines, then on 14 February 1799, Bickerton attained the rank of rear-admiral and, towards the end of the year, took up the position of Assistant Port Admiral at Portsmouth. (Note: Colonel of Marines was a ceremonial rank in the Royal Navy, usually bestowed upon Post Captains for good service. It carried an increase in salary with no extra duties or responsibilities. Not to be confused with a colonel in the marines.)

==== Service in the Mediterranean ====
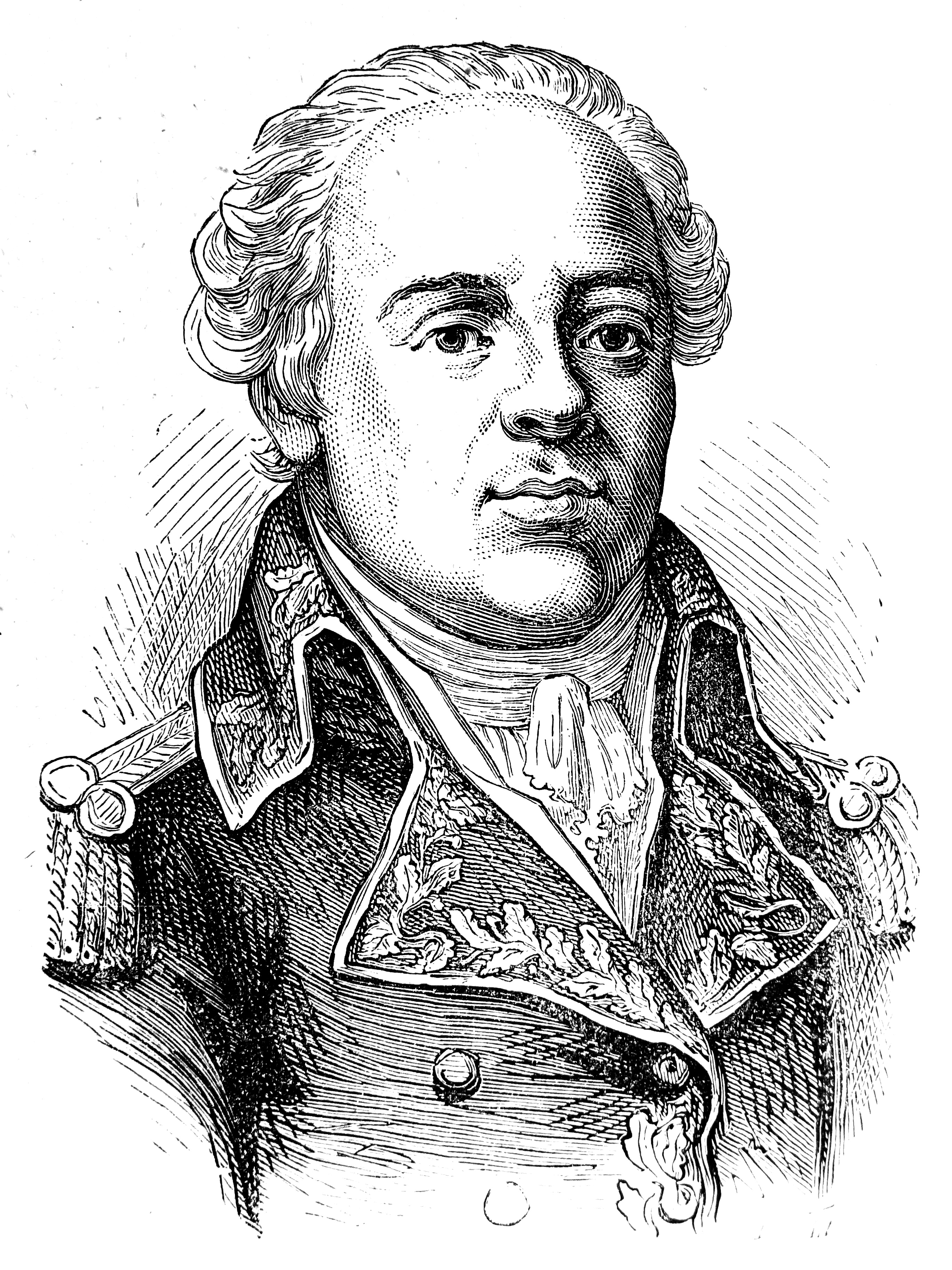
Jacques-François Menou, who praised Bickerton's handling of the French evacuation from Egypt

Bickerton hoisted his flag in Seahorse on 13 May 1800 and was ordered to transport generals Abercromby, Moore and Hutchinson to the Mediterranean; after which he spent the rest of the war under Lord Keith, on blockade duty. On 10 June, Bickerton transferred his flag to the 74-gun Swiftsure and began a five-month command of a squadron off Cádiz. During 1801, he worked on HMS Kent, maintaining a blockade on the port of Alexandria until its capitulation on 27 August. He provided support during this time for Lieutenant-General Hutchinson.

Left to oversee the evacuation of the French Army of the Orient back to Europe, Bickerton conducted this task with such efficiency that he earned the respect of the army's commander-in-chief Jacques-François Menou, who acknowledged that "the vigilance of Sir Richard's squadron had accelerated the reduction of that place, as it cut them off from all supply". For his part in the Anglo-Ottoman victory, the Ottomans awarded Bickerton with the Order of the Crescent on 8 October 1801. Following the Treaty of Amiens, Bickerton was left behind in command of the Mediterranean Fleet.

=== Napoleonic Wars ===
By 1804, still in the Mediterranean and having transferred to Royal Sovereign, Bickerton was serving as Second-in-Command to Admiral Lord Nelson, maintaining a close blockade on the French port of Toulon and when Nelson received the thanks of the Corporation of London, he insisted that Bickerton received equal recognition. Bickerton was elevated to Commander-in-Chief in the Mediterranean when Nelson left to pursue the French Fleet across the Atlantic.

=== Later career ===
In spring 1805, a liver complaint forced Bickerton to return to England. He was promoted to vice-admiral on 9 November 1805 and then appointed to the Board of Admiralty in April 1807. He became First Naval Lord in the second Portland ministry in May 1808. On 31 July 1810 Bickerton attained the rank of full admiral and in March 1812 he left the Admiralty Board and, one month later, was appointed Commander-in-Chief, Portsmouth with Puissant as his flagship. Bickerton still held this post in 1814 when the Treaty of Paris was celebrated with a Grand Naval Review at Spithead, which was his last active service. The event took place on 24 and 25 June, before the Prince Regent and his allies. Bickerton was appointed a Knight Commander of the Order of the Bath (KCB) on 2 January 1815. On 5 January 1818 Bickerton was promoted to Lieutenant-general of the Marines, then General of the Marines in June 1830. (Note: The ranks Lieutenant-general of the Marines and General of the Marines, like Colonel of the Marines, were ceremonial.)

== Political career ==
Bickerton was elected a Conservative Member of Parliament for Poole in February 1808, but he did not run for re-election in 1812. He did not often speak in Parliamentary debates, except on naval issues.

== Death ==
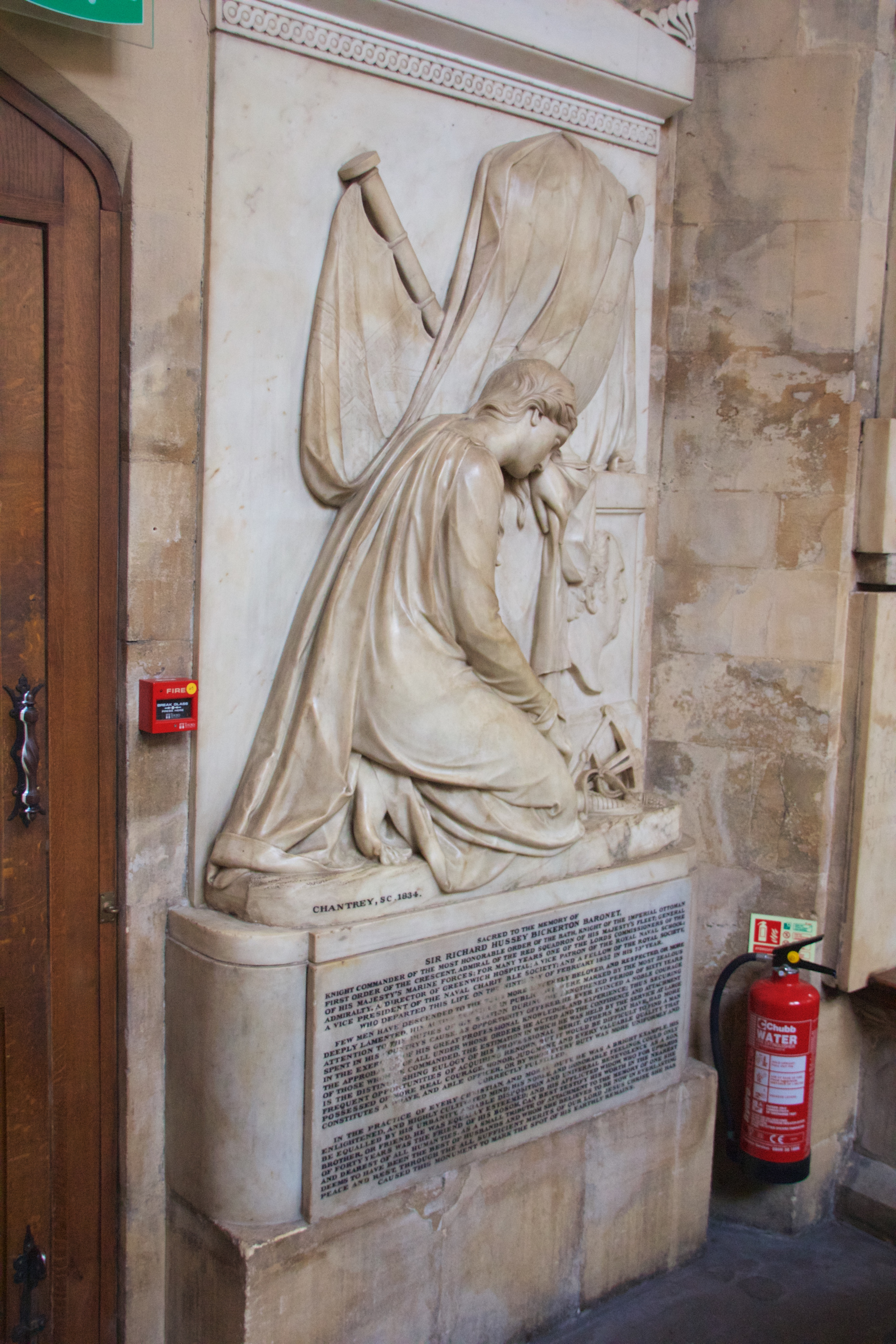
Bickerton's memorial in Bath Abbey

Bickerton died at his home, No. 15 The Circus, Bath, at the age of 72 on 9 February 1832. His wife outlived him, dying on 2 March 1850. As the couple had no children, the estate passed to Anne's nephew, Vice-admiral Sir Richard Hussey Moubray. The lack of male issue also meant the baronetcy became extinct with his death.

A memorial to Bickerton, by Francis Leggatt Chantrey, was erected in Bath Abbey in 1834. Bickerton Island off the east coast of Australia's Northern Territory was named for him by the British navigator and cartographer, Matthew Flinders, who was the first to circumnavigate the continent.

== Sources ==
- Rodger, N.A.M. (1979). The Admiralty. Offices of State. Lavenham: T. Dalton Ltd. ISBN 0900963948.

Parliament of the United Kingdom
Preceded by John Jeffery; George Garland	Member of Parliament for Poole; 1807–1812; With: John Jeffery 1808–1809; Benjamin Lester Lester 1809–1812	Succeeded by Benjamin Lester Lester; Michael Angelo Taylor
Military offices
Preceded by James Gambier	First Naval Lord; 1808–1812	Succeeded by William Domett
Preceded by Sir Roger Curtis	Commander-in-Chief, Portsmouth; 1812–1815	Succeeded by Sir Edward Thornbrough
Baronetage of Great Britain
Preceded by Richard Bickerton	Baronet (of Upwood); 1792–1832	Extinct
