= Poole by-election =

Poole by-election may refer to

- 1874 Poole by-election
- 1884 Poole by-election
