= Thomas Wyndham (of Hammersmith) =

British Member of Parliament (died 1777)

Thomas Wyndham (c.1693–1777), of Tale, Devon, was an English Whig politician who sat in the House of Commons from 1732 to 1741.

== Biography ==
Wyndham was the only son of Edmund Wyndham of Tale and his wife Penelope Dodington, daughter of John Dodington of Dodington, Somerset. He succeeded his father in 1723.

Wyndham was returned unopposed as Member of Parliament for Poole on the government interest at a by-election on 26 April 1732. He was probably put forward through the influence of his cousin, George Bubb Dodington, who was a Lord of the Treasury. He was returned unopposed again for Poole at the 1734 British general election. He voted for the Administration in all recorded divisions until 1740, when Dodington went into opposition. He did not stand in 1741.

Dodington owned the villa of La Trappe in Hammersmith where Wyndham was one of his constant companions, known as the monks. In 1762 Wyndham inherited all Dodington's disposable estate including the villa at Hammersmith, which became his home. In 1772 he was appointed Commissioner of Land Tax, a post he held for the rest of his life.

Wyndham died unmarried at Hammersmith on 19 September 1777, the last of the Wyndham line of Tale. He was described as a "misanthrope".

Parliament of Great Britain
Preceded by George Trenchard; Denis Bond	Member of Parliament for Poole; 1732–1741; With: George Trenchard	Succeeded by Joseph Gulston; Thomas Missing
