= Benjamin Lester =

British politician and merchant

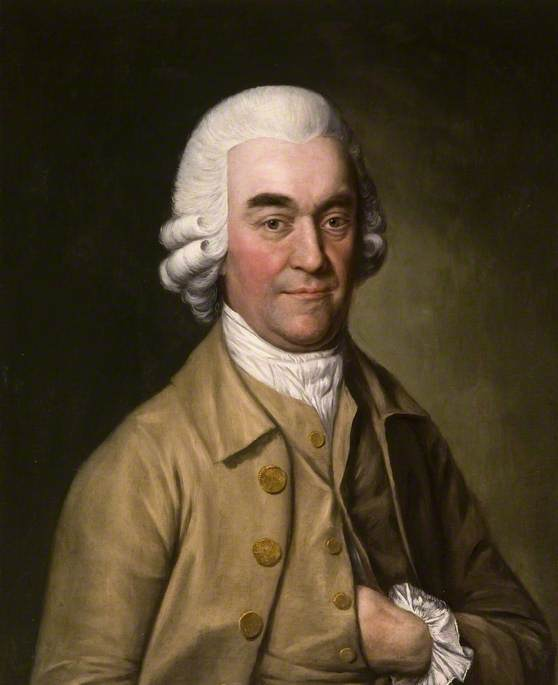
- oil-on-canvas of Lester at Poole Museum

Member of the Great Britain Parliament for Poole
- In office 1790–1796 Serving with Charles Stuart 1790–1791; Michael Angelo Taylor 1791–1796
- Preceded by: William Morton Pitt; Michael Angelo Taylor
- Succeeded by: John Jeffery; Charles Stuart

Mayor of Poole
- In office 1779–1779
- In office 1781–1783

Personal details
- Born: 13 July 1724 Poole, England
- Died: 25 January 1802 (aged 77) Poole, England

Benjamin Lester (13 July 1724 – 25 January 1802) was a British politician and merchant involved in the Newfoundland fishery.

He was born in Poole, England, the son of Rachell Taverner and Francis Lester, who was a merchant and also served as mayor of Poole, and the nephew of William Taverner. His father was involved in the Newfoundland fish trade and Lester went to Newfoundland around 1737, working for another merchant from Poole involved in the fishery. He married his cousin Susannah Taverner around 1750. After the death of his employers, he entered the fish trade on his own, partnering with his brother Isaac. His operations were based in the area of Trinity. During the 1760s, he began building a large brick house there, now preserved as the Lester-Garland house. In 1762, he was forced to temporarily surrender Trinity to the French. Lester continued to return to Newfoundland for the fishing season until 1776. After that, he continued to manage operations from England and his business continued to expand until he owned a fleet of almost 30 ships, making his the largest in the area. Lester was also involved in the trade in seals.

In England, he lobbied for the exclusion of the Americans from the fish trade. He also opposed the concession of Saint-Pierre and Miquelon to France. Lester served as mayor of Poole in 1779 and from 1781 to 1783 and was Member of Parliament representing Poole from 1790 to 1796.

He was uncle to Lieutenant General Sir Frederick Parkinson Lester through his elder brother John Lester of Racquet Court.

After his death in Poole in 1802, his son-in-law George Garland, who had married Lester's daughter Amy, took over the operation of the business which Lester had established.

Parliament of Great Britain
Preceded by William Morton Pitt; Michael Angelo Taylor	Member of Parliament for Poole; 1790–1796; With: Hon. Charles Stuart 1790–91; Michael Angelo Taylor 1791–96	Succeeded by John Jeffery; Hon. Charles Stuart
