= George Byng, 2nd Earl of Strafford =

British politician

The Right Honourable The Earl of Strafford PC
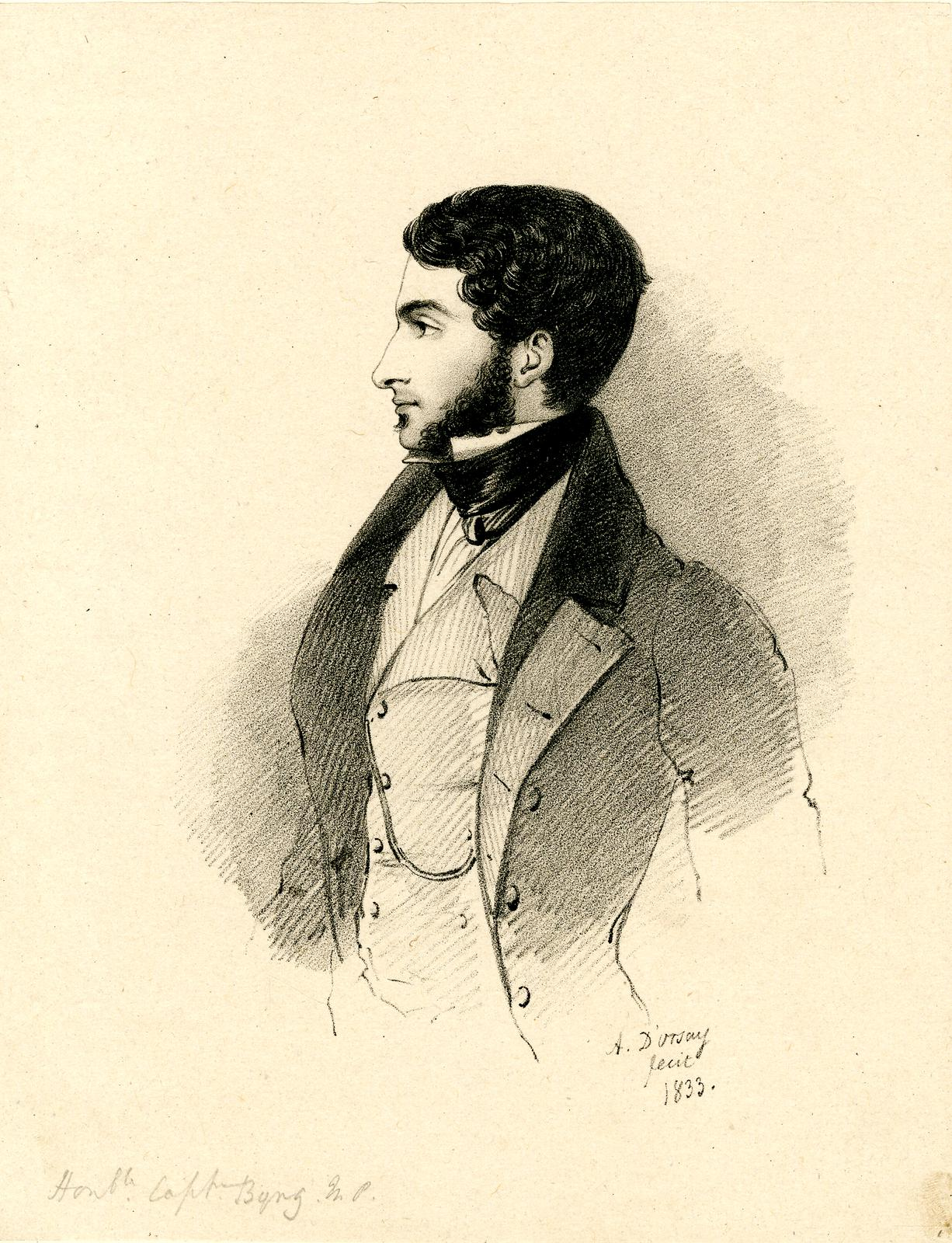
- Portrait by Alfred d'Orsay, 1833

Comptroller of the Household
- In office 6 May 1835 – 23 June 1841
- Monarchs: William IV; Victoria
- Prime Minister: The Viscount Melbourne
- Preceded by: Hon. Henry Lowry-Corry
- Succeeded by: Lord Marcus Hill

Treasurer of the Household
- In office 23 June 1841 – 30 August 1841
- Monarch: Victoria
- Prime Minister: The Viscount Melbourne
- Preceded by: Earl of Surrey
- Succeeded by: Earl Jermyn

Personal details
- Born: 8 June 1806
- Died: 29 October 1886 (aged 80)
- Party: Whig
- Spouse(s): (1) Lady Agnes Paget (c. 1809–1845) (2) Hon. Harriett Cavendish (d. 1892)
- Education: Royal Military Academy Sandhurst

Arms of Byng, Earl of Stratford, being the arms of John Byng, 1st Earl of Strafford, namely paternal arms of Byng (Quarterly sable and argent in the first quarter a lion rampant of the second), with augmentation of honour granted in 1815 by the Prince Regent of in bend sinister a representation of the colour of the 31st Regiment of Foot, in recognition of his heroic action at the Battle of the Nive

George Stevens Byng, 2nd Earl of Strafford, PC (8 June 1806 – 29 October 1886), styled Viscount Enfield between 1847 and 1860, of Wrotham Park in Middlesex (now Hertfordshire) and of 5 St James's Square, London, was a British peer and Whig politician.

== Origins ==
Byng was the eldest son of Field Marshal John Byng, 1st Earl of Strafford (1772–1860) by his first wife, Mary Mackenzie.

== Military career ==
In 1822, after graduating from the Royal Military College, Byng joined the 29th Regiment of Foot as an ensign by purchase. In 1825 he transferred to the 85th Regiment of Foot as a lieutenant and was promoted to captain in 1826, in which rank he served in the 60th Rifles. In 1837, after he had begun his political career, he was appointed Lieutenant-Colonel of the part-time Royal West Middlesex Militia. On the death of the regiment's colonel in 1844 Byng succeeded to the command. His eldest son, the Hon George Byng, was commissioned as his lt-col on 30 October 1853. He retired from the command and became the regiment's Honorary Colonel on 5 December 1859.

== Political career ==
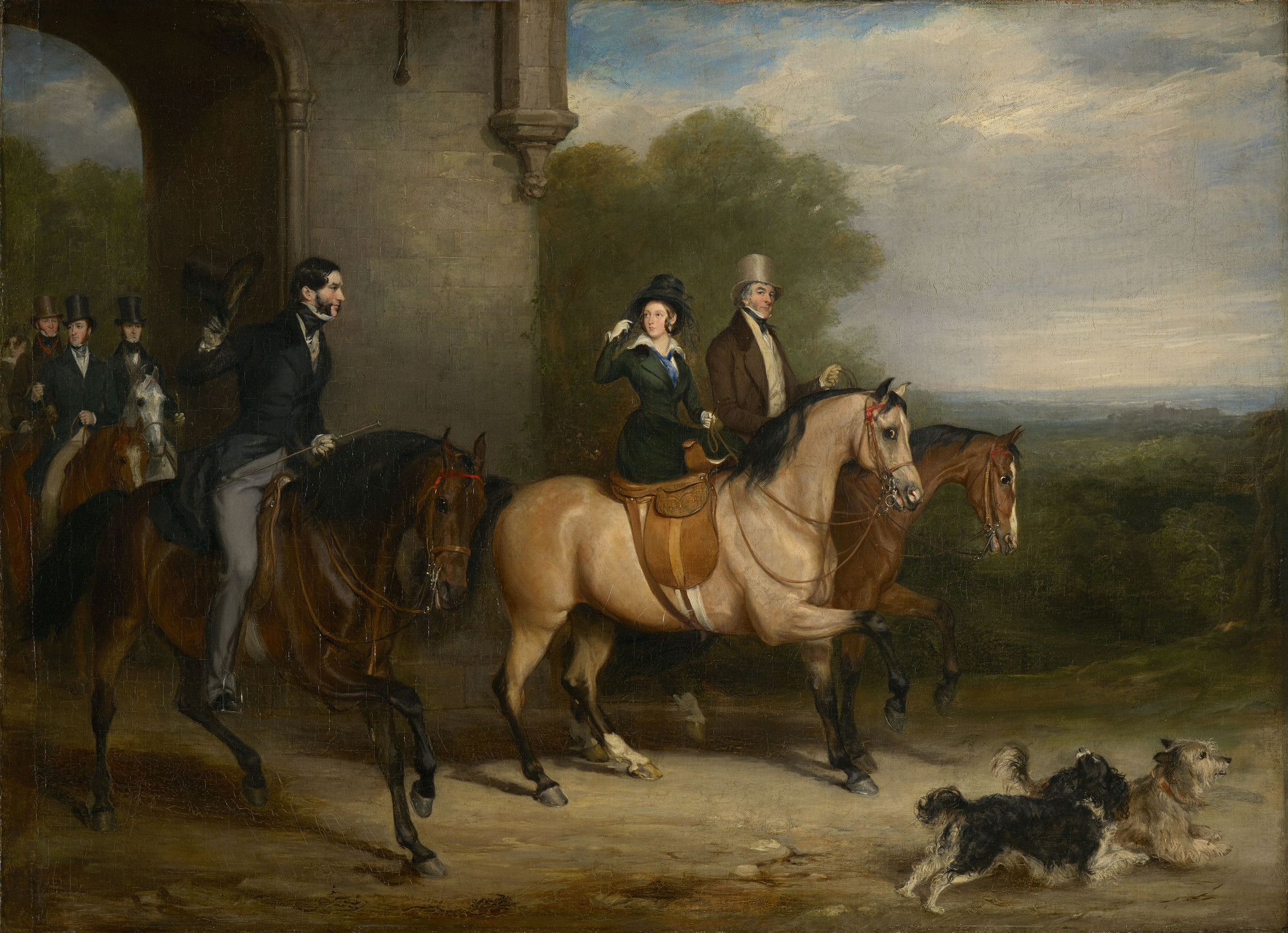
Queen Victoria Riding Out by Francis Grant, 1940. Byng is amongst the group of courtiers on the left

Byng's political career began in 1830 when he was elected as a Member of Parliament for Milborne Port, a seat he briefly held before taking the post of Comptroller of the Household to the Lord-Lieutenant of Ireland (his father-in-law, Lord Anglesey), less than a year later. When his former co-MP, William Sturges-Bourne resigned his seat a few weeks later, Byng returned to his former seat and held it until the Great Reform Bill of 1832 abolished the constituency. From 1834 he was MP for the new constituency of Chatham, a seat he held until 1835 and again from 1837 to 1852. He served under Lord Melbourne as a Lord of the Treasury between June and November 1834.

According to the Legacies of British Slave-Ownership at the University College London, Strafford made an unsuccessful claim for compensation in the aftermath of the Slavery Abolition Act 1833 with the Slave Compensation Act 1837.

Between 1836 and 1837 he represented Poole in parliament. He again served under Lord Melbourne as Comptroller of the Household between 1835 and 1841 and as Treasurer of the Household between June and August 1841 and was sworn of the Privy Council in 1835. When Lord John Russell became Prime Minister in 1846, Byng was appointed Joint Secretary to the Board of Control, a post he retained until 1847.

After losing his parliamentary seat in 1852, Byng was summoned to the House of Lords through a writ of acceleration in his father's barony of Strafford a year later and inherited his father's earldom in 1860.

== Marriages and progeny ==
Byng married twice:

- Firstly on 7 March 1829 to Lady Agnes Paget (d. October 1845), a daughter of Field Marshal Henry Paget, 1st Marquess of Anglesey, by whom he had six children:
  - George Byng, 3rd Earl of Strafford (22 Feb 1830 – 28 Mar 1898), eldest son and heir. Died without surviving male progeny.
  - Henry Byng, 4th Earl of Strafford (21 Aug 1831 – 16 May 1899), 2nd son, who succeeded his elder brother in the titles. Died without surviving male progeny.
  - Lady Agnes Mary Georgiana Byng (29 Oct 1833 – 7 Apr 1878), who married Hedworth Jolliffe, 2nd Baron Hylton.
  - Francis Edmund Cecil Byng, 5th Earl of Strafford (1835–1918), 3rd son, who succeeded his elder brother in the titles.
  - Lady Mary Caroline Charlotte Byng (1838–1933), who married the barrister Richard Arkwright.
  - Lady Victoria Alexandrina Anna Maria Byng (11 Mar 1842 – 1899), who married Arthur Fuller.
- Secondly in 1848 he married the Hon. Harriett Cavendish, a daughter of Charles Cavendish, 1st Baron Chesham, by whom he had a further seven children:
  - Hon. Charles Cavendish George Byng (1849–1918).
  - Hon. Alfred John George Byng (1851–1887).
  - Lady Susan Catherine Harriet Byng (19 Mar 1854 – 1936), who married Thomas Trueman.
  - Lady Elizabeth Henrietta Alice Byng (31 Dec 1855 – 1920).
  - Hon. Lionel Francis George Byng (1858–1915), who in 1902 married Lady Eleanor Mabel Howard (1873–1945), a daughter of Henry Howard, 18th Earl of Suffolk, by whom he had issue.
  - Lady Margaret Florence Lucy Byng (6 Nov 1860 – 1945), who married Hon. John Richard Boscawen.
  - Julian Hedworth George Byng, 1st Viscount Byng of Vimy (1862–1935).

== Death ==
Lord Strafford died in October 1886, aged 80, and was succeeded in his titles by his eldest son, George. The Countess of Strafford died in June 1892.

Parliament of the United Kingdom
Preceded by Arthur Chichester; John North	Member of Parliament for Milborne Port; 1830–1831; With: William Sturges-Bourne	Succeeded by William Sturges-Bourne; Richard Sheil
Preceded by William Sturges-Bourne; Richard Sheil	Member of Parliament for Milborne Port; 1831–1832; With: Richard Shiel 1831; Philip Crampton 1831–1832	Constituency abolished
Preceded by William Maberly	Member of Parliament for Chatham; 1834–1835	Succeeded by Sir John Beresford
Preceded by Sir John Byng; Charles Augustus Tulk	Member of Parliament for Poole; 1835 – 1837; With: Charles Augustus Tulk	Succeeded by Charles Ponsonby; George Philips
Preceded by Sir John Beresford, Bt	Member of Parliament for Chatham; 1837–1852	Succeeded by Sir Frederick Smith
Political offices
Preceded by Hon. Henry Lowry-Corry	Comptroller of the Household; 1835–1841	Succeeded by Lord Marcus Hill
Preceded by The Earl of Surrey	Treasurer of the Household; 1841	Succeeded by Earl Jermyn
Preceded by Viscount Jocelyn; Viscount Mahon	Joint Secretary to the Board of Control; 1846–1847; Served alongside: Thomas Wyse	Succeeded by Thomas Wyse; George Lewis
Peerage of the United Kingdom
Preceded by John Byng	Earl of Strafford; 3rd creation 1860–1886	Succeeded by George Byng
Preceded by John Byng	Baron Strafford (writ of acceleration) (descended by acceleration); 1853–1874	Succeeded by George Byng
