= George Garland Jr. =

Newfoundland merchant (1793–1833)

George Garland (August 2, 1793 – February 20, 1833) was an early Newfoundland merchant and magistrate.

== Life and work ==
Garland was born in Poole, England, the son of George Garland and the grandson of Benjamin Lester. At the age of 14, he was sent to Trinity in Newfoundland to be trained in the fishery operated by his family. In 1812, he was sent to Lisbon to manage a branch of his father's brokerage business. He returned to Trinity in 1819 with his older brother John Bingley Garland. Later that year, he was named a justice of the peace by the colony's governor. With his brother, he was involved in the construction of St. Paul's church in Trinity in 1821.

In 1828, he returned to Poole due to ill health, never to return to Newfoundland. He died at a country estate near Poole five years later.
