= William Biddlecombe =

English merchant, mayor and Member of Parliament

William Biddlecombe (by 1488–1546/47), of Poole, Dorset was an English merchant, mayor and Member of Parliament (MP).

He was a Member of the Parliament of England for Poole in 1529, ?1536 and ?1539. He was Mayor of Poole 1515–16, 1521–22, 1530–31, 1536–37 and 1543–44.
