= Oliver Lawrence =

English Member of Parliament (d. 1559)

Oliver Lawrence (by 1507 – 1559), of Poole and Creech St Michael, Dorset; London and Soberton, Hampshire, was an English Member of Parliament (MP).

He was a Member of the Parliament of England for Melcombe Regis in 1529, Poole (UK Parliament constituency) in 1542 and 1545 and for Dorset (UK Parliament constituency) in 1558.
