= William James Harris =

William James Harris MP

Member of Parliament for Poole
- In office 19 April 1884 – 25 November 1885
- Preceded by: Charles Schreiber
- Succeeded by: Constituency abolished

Personal details
- Born: 1835
- Died: 29 October 1911 (aged 76)
- Party: Conservative

William James Harris (1835 – 29 October 1911) was a Conservative Party politician.

Harris was elected MP for Poole at a by-election in 1884. However, in 1885 the seat was abolished and Harris sought re-election in Ashburton, where he was unsuccessful.

Parliament of the United Kingdom
Preceded by Charles Schreiber	Member of Parliament for Poole; 1884–1885	Abolished
