= Ralph Worsley =

16th-century English politician

Ralph Worsley (by 1464 – 1529 or later), of Hamworthy and Wimborne Minster, Dorset, was an English politician.

== Family ==
Worsley may have been the son of John Worsley of Dorset. By 1507, he had married a woman named Ellen.

== Career ==
He was a member (MP) of the parliament of England for Poole in 1512.
