= Poole (constituency) =

Parliamentary constituency in the United Kingdom, 1950 onwards

- Borough constituency for the House of Commons
- Interactive map of boundaries since 2024
- Boundary of Poole in South West England
- County: Dorset
- Electorate: 72,162 (2023)
- Major settlements: Poole

Current constituency
- Created: 1950
- Member of Parliament: Neil Duncan-Jordan (Labour)
- Seats: One
- Created from: East Dorset

1455–1885
- Seats: Two (1455–1868); One (1868–1885)
- Replaced by: East Dorset

Poole is a constituency (Note: A county constituency (for the purposes of election expenses and type of returning officer).) in Dorset represented in the House of Commons of the UK Parliament since 2024 by Neil Duncan-Jordan, a member of the Labour Party. (Note: As with all constituencies, the constituency elects one Member of Parliament (MP) by the first past the post system of election at least every 5 years.)

== Constituency profile ==
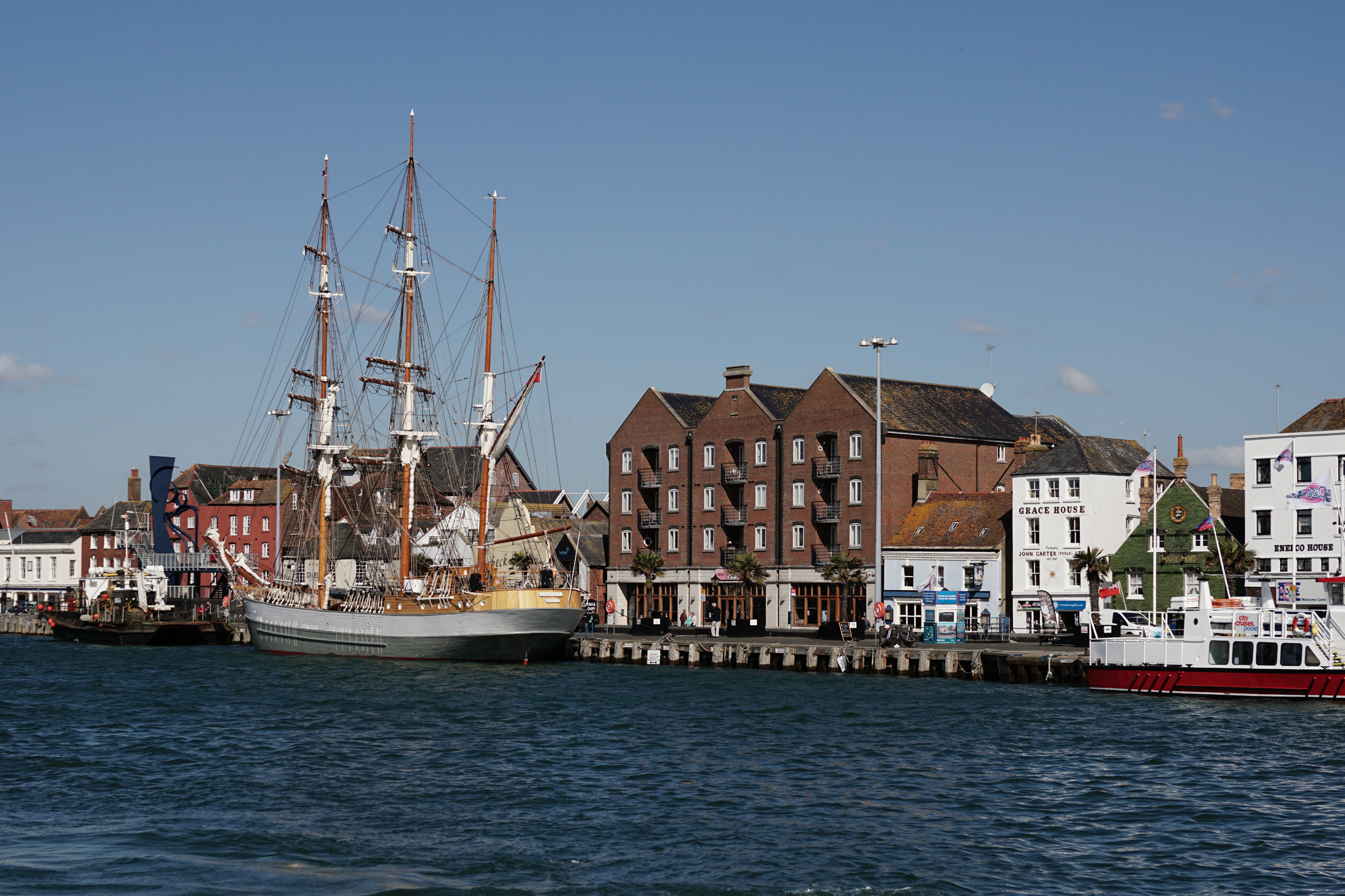
Poole Quay

Poole is a constituency in Dorset in South West England. It covers most of the town of Poole, including the town centre and the neighbourhoods of Hamworthy, Turlin Moor, Creekmoor, Oakdale, Newtown, Parkstone, Branksome Park, Lilliput, Canford Cliffs and Sandbanks.

Poole is a large, coastal town with a history of maritime trade. Situated in Poole Harbour, the town was one of the country's busiest ports in the early industrial era until ships became too large for its shallow harbour. Poole is also a tourist resort known for its Blue Flag beaches. Many of the town's neighbourhoods were developed during the Victorian era. Canford Cliffs and Sandbanks have been dubbed "Britain's Palm Beach" and contain some of the most expensive properties in the country. The constituency overall has average levels of wealth; there is some deprivation in the town centre whilst the eastern suburbs are highly affluent. House prices across the constituency are generally higher than the regional and UK averages.

Poole has a below-average young adult population and a high proportion of retirees. Residents have average levels of income and homeownership and low rates of child poverty. They generally have average levels of education and a high proportion work in the health and manufacturing sectors. White people made up 94% of the population at the 2021 census.

At the local council, Poole town centre is represented by localists, most of the suburbs by Liberal Democrats and the wealthy eastern neighbourhoods by Conservatives. An estimated 58% of voters in Poole supported leaving the European Union in the 2016 referendum, higher than the UK-wide rate of 52%.

== History ==
The first version of the Poole constituency existed from 1455 until 1885. During this period its exact status was a parliamentary borough, sending two burgesses to Westminster per year, except during its last 17 years, when its representation was reduced to one member.

During its abeyance, most of Poole was in the East Dorset seat and, since its recreation in 1950, its area has been reduced as the harbour town's population has increased.

From its recreation in 1950, the seat had always elected Conservative MPs with comfortable majorities. However, at the 2024 general election, Labour captured the seat for the first time with a majority of just 18 votes.

== Boundaries ==
Map of boundaries 2010-2024

1950–1983: The Municipal Borough of Poole.

1983–1997: The Borough of Poole wards of Broadstone, Canford Cliffs, Canford Heath, Creekmoor, Hamworthy, Harbour, Newtown, Oakdale, Parkstone, and Penn Hill.

1997–2010: The Borough of Poole wards of Bourne Valley, Canford Cliffs, Hamworthy, Harbour, Newtown, Oakdale, Parkstone, and Penn Hill.

2010–2019: The Borough of Poole wards of Branksome West, Canford Cliffs, Creekmoor, Hamworthy East, Hamworthy West, Newtown, Oakdale, Parkstone, Penn Hill, and Poole Town.

2019–2024: The Bournemouth, Christchurch and Poole Council wards of Alderney and Bourne Valley (part), Broadstone (very small part), Canford Cliffs (nearly all), Canford Heath (very small part), Creekmoor, Hamworthy, Newtown and Heatherlands (most), Oakdale, Parkstone, Penn Hill and Poole Town

Changes arising from re-organisation of local authorities and wards in Dorset; no change in boundaries.

2024–present: The District of Bournemouth, Christchurch and Poole wards of: Canford Cliffs; Creekmoor; Hamworthy; Newtown & Heatherlands; Oakdale; Parkstone; Penn Hill; Poole Town.

Minor changes to align boundaries to those of local authority wards.

== Members of Parliament ==
=== MPs 1455–1629 ===
- Borough established 1455, returning two members

Parliament	First member	Second member
1510	No names known	
1512	Richard Phelips	Ralph Worsley
1515	Richard Phelips	?
1523	?	
1529	William Thornhill	William Biddlecombe
1536	?William Biddlecombe	?
1539	?William Biddlecombe	?
1542	Oliver Lawrence	John Carew
1545	Oliver Lawrence	John Harward
1547	John Hannam	John Harward
1553 (Mar)	William Newman	Thomas White
1553 (Oct)	Anthony Dillington	John Scryvin
Parliament of 1554	William Wightman	Richard Shaw
Parliament of 1554–1555	Anthony Dillington	Andrew Hourde
Parliament of 1555	Robert Whitt	John Phelips
Parliament of 1558	Thomas Goodwin	Thomas Phelips
Parliament of 1559	Walter Haddon	Humphrey Mitchel
Parliament of 1563–1567	William Green	Humphrey Mitchel
Parliament of 1571	George Carleton	William Newman
Parliament of 1572–1581	William Green	John Hastings
Parliament of 1584–1585	Francis Mills	Thomas Vincent
Parliament of 1586–1587	Francis Mills	William Fleetwood, junior
Parliament of 1588–1589	Henry Ashley	Edward Man
Parliament of 1593	James Orrenge	Edward Man
Parliament of 1597–1598	Roger Mawdeley	Edward Man
Parliament of 1601	Robert Miller	Thomas Billet
Parliament of 1604–1611	Thomas Robarts	Edward Man
Addled Parliament (1614)	Sir Walter Erle	Sir Thomas Walsingham, junior
Parliament of 1621–1622	Sir Walter Erle	Sir George Horsey
Happy Parliament (1624–1625)	Sir Walter Erle	Edward Pitt
Useless Parliament (1625)	John Pyne	Sir John Cooper
Parliament of 1625–1626	John Pyne	Christopher Erle
Parliament of 1628–1629	John Pyne	Sir John Cooper
No Parliament summoned 1629–1640

=== MPs 1640–1868 ===
Year	First member	First party	Second member	Second party
April 1640	John Pyne	Parliamentarian	William Constantine	Royalist
November 1640	John Pyne	Parliamentarian	William Constantine	Royalist
September 1642	John Pyne	Parliamentarian	Constantine disabled from sitting – seat vacant	
1645	John Pyne	Parliamentarian	George Skutt	
December 1648	John Pyne	Parliamentarian	Skutt excluded in Pride's Purge – seat vacant	
1653	Poole was unrepresented in the Barebones Parliament			
1654	Sir Anthony Ashley Cooper		Poole had only one seat in the First and Second Parliaments of the Protectorate	
1656	Edward Boteler		Poole had only one seat in the First and Second Parliaments of the Protectorate	
January 1659	Colonel John Fitzjames		Samuel Bond	
May 1659	John Pyne		One seat vacant	
April 1660	George Cooper		Sir Walter Erle	
1661	Sir John Fitzjames		(Sir) John Morton	
1670	Thomas Trenchard		(Sir) John Morton	
February 1673	George Cooper		(Sir) John Morton	
March 1673	Thomas Strangways		(Sir) John Morton	
1679	Henry Trenchard		Thomas Chafin	
1685	William Ettrick		Thomas Chafin	
1689	Henry Trenchard		Sir Nathaniel Napier	
1690	Sir John Trenchard	Whig	Sir Nathaniel Napier	
1695	Lord Ashley		Sir Nathaniel Napier	
1698	William Joliffe		Sir William Phippard	
1705	Samuel Weston		Sir William Phippard	
1708	William Lewen	Tory	Thomas Ridge	Whig
1710	Sir William Phippard		Thomas Ridge	Whig
1711	Sir William Phippard		Sir William Lewen	Tory
1713	George Trenchard	Whig	Sir William Lewen	Tory
1722	George Trenchard	Whig	Thomas Ridge	Whig
1727	George Trenchard	Whig	Denis Bond	
1732	George Trenchard	Whig	Thomas Wyndham	Whig
1741	Joseph Gulston		Thomas Missing	
1747	Joseph Gulston		George Trenchard	Whig
1754	Joseph Gulston		Colonel Sir Richard Lyttelton	
1761	Joseph Gulston		Lieutenant-Colonel Thomas Calcraft	
1765	Joseph Gulston		Lieutenant-Colonel Thomas Calcraft	
1768	Joshua Mauger		Lieutenant-Colonel Thomas Calcraft	
1774	Joshua Mauger		Major-General Sir Eyre Coote	
1780	Joseph Gulston		William Morton Pitt	
1784	Michael Angelo Taylor		William Morton Pitt	
1790	Colonel Hon. Charles Stuart		Benjamin Lester	
1791	Michael Angelo Taylor		Benjamin Lester	
1796	Colonel Hon. Charles Stuart		John Jeffery	
1801	George Garland		John Jeffery	
1808	Sir Richard Bickerton		John Jeffery	
1809	Sir Richard Bickerton		Benjamin Lester Lester	Whig
1812	Michael Angelo Taylor	Whig	Benjamin Lester Lester	Whig
1818	John Dent	Non-partisan	Benjamin Lester Lester	Whig
1826	Hon. William Ponsonby	Whig	Benjamin Lester Lester	Whig
1831	Sir John Byng	Whig	Benjamin Lester Lester	Whig
January 1835	Sir John Byng	Whig	Charles Augustus Tulk	Whig
May 1835	Hon. George Byng	Whig	Charles Augustus Tulk	Whig
1837	Hon. Charles Ponsonby	Whig	George Philips	Whig
1847	George Richard Robinson	Peelite	George Philips	Whig
1850	Henry Danby Seymour	Whig	George Philips	Whig
1852	Henry Danby Seymour	Whig	George Woodroffe Franklyn	Conservative
1859	Henry Danby Seymour	Liberal	George Woodroffe Franklyn	Conservative
1865	Henry Danby Seymour	Liberal	Charles Waring	Liberal
1868	Representation reduced to one Member			

=== MPs 1868–1885 ===
Election	Member	Party
1868	Arthur Guest	Conservative
1874	Charles Waring	Liberal
May 1874 by-election	Hon. Evelyn Ashley	Liberal
1880	Charles Schreiber	Conservative
1884 by-election	William James Harris	Conservative
1885	Constituency abolished	

=== MPs since 1950 ===
Election	Member	Party	Notes
1950	Mervyn Wheatley	Conservative	
1951	Richard Pilkington	Conservative	
1964	Oscar Murton	Conservative	Chairman of Ways and Means 1976–79
1979	John Ward	Conservative	
1997	Sir Robert Syms	Conservative	
2024	Neil Duncan-Jordan	Labour	
July 2025	Neil Duncan-Jordan	Independent	
November 2025	Neil Duncan-Jordan	Labour	

== Elections ==
=== Elections in the 2020s ===
General election 2024: Poole
Party	Candidate	Votes	%	±%
Labour	Neil Duncan-Jordan	14,168	31.84	+11.1
Conservative	Robert Syms	14,150	31.80	−27.0
Reform	Andrei Dragotoniu	7,429	16.7	N/A
Liberal Democrats	Oliver Walters	5,507	12.4	−2.9
Green	Sarah Ward	2,218	5.0	+1.6
Independent	Joe Cronin	698	1.6	N/A
UKIP	Leanne Barnes	325	0.7	N/A
Majority		18	0.04	N/A
Turnout		44,495	61.4	−6.2
Registered electors		72,509		
Labour gain from Conservative		Swing	+19.1	

=== Elections in the 2010s ===
2019 notional result
Party	Vote	%
Conservative	28,695	58.8
Labour	10,087	20.7
Liberal Democrats	7,490	15.3
Green	1,681	3.4
Others	848	1.7
Turnout	48,801	67.6
Electorate	72,162	

General election 2019: Poole
Party	Candidate	Votes	%	±%
Conservative	Robert Syms	29,599	58.7	+0.8
Labour Co-op	Sue Aitkenhead	10,483	20.7	−8.7
Liberal Democrats	Victoria Collins	7,819	15.5	+6.6
Green	Barry Harding-Rathbone	1,702	3.4	+0.8
Independent	David Young (Note: Having stood for UKIP in 2015 Dr David Young was in September 2019 adopted to be the Brexit Party candidate. Following that party's withdrawal of all its candidates in seats held by the Conservatives he decided to stand as an independent.)	848	1.7	N/A
Majority		19,116	38.0	+9.5
Turnout		50,451	68.2	+0.7
Conservative hold		Swing	+4.8	

General election 2017: Poole
Party	Candidate	Votes	%	±%
Conservative	Robert Syms	28,888	57.9	+7.8
Labour	Katie Taylor	14,679	29.4	+16.5
Liberal Democrats	Mike Plummer	4,433	8.9	−2.9
Green	Adrian Oliver	1,299	2.6	−2.0
Demos Direct Initiative	Marty Caine	551	1.1	N/A
Majority		14,209	28.5	−4.8
Turnout		49,850	67.5	+2.2
Conservative hold		Swing		

General election 2015: Poole
Party	Candidate	Votes	%	±%
Conservative	Robert Syms	23,745	50.1	+2.6
UKIP	David Young	7,956	16.8	+11.5
Labour	Helen Rosser	6,102	12.9	+0.2
Liberal Democrats	Philip Eades	5,572	11.8	−19.8
Green	Adrian Oliver	2,198	4.6	N/A
Poole People	Mark Howell	1,766	3.7	N/A
Independent	Ian Northover	54	0.1	−0.3
Majority		15,789	33.3	+17.4
Turnout		47,393	65.3	−8.1
Conservative hold		Swing		

General election 2010: Poole
Party	Candidate	Votes	%	±%
Conservative	Robert Syms	22,532	47.5	+4.1
Liberal Democrats	Phillip Eades	14,991	31.6	+2.5
Labour	Jason Sanderson	6,041	12.7	−10.0
UKIP	Nick Wellstead	2,507	5.3	+1.8
BNP	David Holmes	1,188	2.5	+1.2
Independent	Ian Northover	177	0.4	N/A
Majority		7,541	15.9	+1.1
Turnout		47,436	73.4	+9.4
Conservative hold		Swing	+0.8	

=== Elections in the 2000s ===
General election 2005: Poole
Party	Candidate	Votes	%	±%
Conservative	Robert Syms	17,571	43.4	−1.7
Liberal Democrats	Mike Plummer	11,583	28.6	+3.1
Labour	Darren Brown	9,376	23.1	−3.8
UKIP	John Barnes	1,436	3.5	+1.0
BNP	Peter Pirnie	547	1.4	N/A
Majority		5,988	14.8	−3.4
Turnout		40,513	63.1	+2.4
Conservative hold		Swing	−2.4	

General election 2001: Poole
Party	Candidate	Votes	%	±%
Conservative	Robert Syms	17,710	45.1	+3.0
Labour	David Watt	10,544	26.9	+5.3
Liberal Democrats	Nick Westbrook	10,011	25.5	−5.3
UKIP	John Bass	968	2.5	+1.5
Majority		7,166	18.2	+6.9
Turnout		39,233	60.7	−10.3
Conservative hold		Swing		

=== Elections in the 1990s ===
General election 1997: Poole
Party	Candidate	Votes	%	±%
Conservative	Robert Syms	19,726	42.1	−11.1
Liberal Democrats	Alan Tetlow	14,428	30.8	−2.0
Labour	Haydn R White	10,100	21.6	+10.6
Referendum	John Riddington	1,932	4.1	N/A
UKIP	Philip Tyler	487	1.0	N/A
Natural Law	Jennifer Rosta	137	0.3	+0.2
Majority		5,298	11.3	−9.1
Turnout		46,810	71.0	−8.4
Conservative hold		Swing	-4.6	

General election 1992: Poole
Party	Candidate	Votes	%	±%
Conservative	John Ward	33,445	53.2	−4.3
Liberal Democrats	BR Clements	20,614	32.8	+0.2
Labour	Haydn R White	6,912	11.0	+1.1
Ind. Conservative	M Steen	1,620	2.6	N/A
Natural Law	AL Bailey	303	0.5	N/A
Majority		12,831	20.4	−4.5
Turnout		62,894	79.4	+1.9
Conservative hold		Swing	−2.3	

=== Elections in the 1980s ===
General election 1987: Poole
Party	Candidate	Votes	%	±%
Conservative	John Ward	34,159	57.5	−0.8
SDP	Robert Whitley	19,351	32.6	+2.0
Labour	Michael Shutler	5,901	9.9	−0.9
Majority		14,808	24.9	−2.8
Turnout		59,411	77.5	+3.9
Conservative hold		Swing	-1.4	

General election 1983: Poole
Party	Candidate	Votes	%	±%
Conservative	John Ward	30,358	58.3	+1.3
Liberal	Brian Clements	15,929	30.6	+8.0
Labour	Michael Castle	5,595	10.8	−11.6
Servicemen & Citizen Association	A Foster	177	0.3	N/A
Majority		14,429	27.7	−6.9
Turnout		52,059	73.6	−4.5
Conservative hold		Swing	-3.3	

=== Elections in the 1970s ===
General election 1979: Poole
Party	Candidate	Votes	%	±%
Conservative	John Ward	38,846	57.01	
Labour	DA Bell	15,291	22.44	
Liberal	B Sutton	14,001	20.55	
Majority		23,555	34.57	
Turnout		68,138	78.13	
Conservative hold		Swing		

General election October 1974: Poole
Party	Candidate	Votes	%	±%
Conservative	Oscar Murton	28,982	46.15	
Liberal	Maxwell Goode	17,557	27.96	
Labour	GW Hobbs	16,262	25.89	
Majority		11,425	18.19	
Turnout		62,801	75.30	
Conservative hold		Swing		

General election February 1974: Poole
Party	Candidate	Votes	%	±%
Conservative	Oscar Murton	31,156	46.04	
Liberal	Maxwell Goode	21,088	31.16	
Labour	GW Hobbs	15,434	22.81	
Majority		10,068	14.88	
Turnout		67,678	81.88	
Conservative hold		Swing		

General election 1970: Poole
Party	Candidate	Votes	%	±%
Conservative	Oscar Murton	31,100	53.11	
Labour	Ian S Campbell	17,610	30.07	
Liberal	Geoffrey Maxwell Goode	9,846	16.81	
Majority		13,490	23.04	
Turnout		58,556	75.06	
Conservative hold		Swing		

=== Elections in the 1960s ===
General election 1966: Poole
Party	Candidate	Votes	%	±%
Conservative	Oscar Murton	25,451	47.59	
Labour	David A Sutton	19,630	36.71	
Liberal	Brian S Sherriff	8,394	15.70	
Majority		5,821	10.88	
Turnout		53,475	79.00	
Conservative hold		Swing		

General election 1964: Poole
Party	Candidate	Votes	%	±%
Conservative	Oscar Murton	24,440	46.26	
Labour	Henry Toch	16,158	30.58	
Liberal	Herbert Charles Richard Ballam	12,234	23.16	
Majority		8,282	15.68	
Turnout		52,832	80.05	
Conservative hold		Swing		

=== Elections in the 1950s ===
General election 1959: Poole
Party	Candidate	Votes	%	±%
Conservative	Richard Pilkington	26,956	52.84	
Labour	Alan Williams	15,325	30.04	
Liberal	James Charles Holland	8,735	17.12	
Majority		11,631	22.80	
Turnout		51,016	80.27	
Conservative hold		Swing		

General election 1955: Poole
Party	Candidate	Votes	%	±%
Conservative	Richard Pilkington	26,594	53.86	
Labour	Frederick Charles Reeves	17,032	34.49	
Liberal	James Charles Holland	5,750	11.65	
Majority		9,562	19.37	
Turnout		49,376	80.94	
Conservative hold		Swing		

General election 1951: Poole
Party	Candidate	Votes	%	±%
Conservative	Richard Pilkington	26,998	53.60	
Labour	Leonard Joseph Matchan	18,346	36.42	
Liberal	William Ridgway	5,029	9.98	
Majority		8,652	17.18	
Turnout		50,373	84.97	
Conservative hold		Swing		

General election 1950: Poole
Party	Candidate	Votes	%	±%
Conservative	Mervyn Wheatley	24,344	49.37	
Labour	Evelyn King	17,831	36.16	
Liberal	William Ridgway	7,130	14.46	
Majority		6,513	13.21	
Turnout		49,305	87.10	
Conservative win (new seat)				

=== Elections in the 1880s ===
By-election, 19 Apr 1884: Poole
Party	Candidate	Votes	%	±%
Conservative	William James Harris	877	51.8	+1.6
Liberal	Thomas Chatfield Clarke	815	48.2	−1.6
Majority		62	3.6	+3.2
Turnout		1,692	85.3	−3.8
Registered electors		1,983		
Conservative hold		Swing	+1.6	

- Caused by Schreiber's death.

General election 1880: Poole
Party	Candidate	Votes	%	±%
Conservative	Charles Schreiber	854	50.2	+5.1
Liberal	Charles Waring	848	49.8	−5.1
Majority		6	0.4	N/A
Turnout		1,702	89.1	+4.9
Registered electors		1,911		
Conservative gain from Liberal		Swing	+5.1	

=== Elections in the 1870s ===
1874 Poole by-election
Party	Candidate	Votes	%	±%
Liberal	Evelyn Ashley	631	50.4	−4.5
Conservative	Ivor Guest	622	49.6	+4.5
Majority		9	0.8	−9.0
Turnout		1,253	82.1	−2.1
Registered electors		1,526		
Liberal hold		Swing	-4.5	

- Caused by the election being declared void on petition, after "corrupt conduct and treating".

General election 1874: Poole
Party	Candidate	Votes	%	±%
Liberal	Charles Waring	705	54.9	+7.4
Conservative	Arthur Guest	580	45.1	−7.4
Majority		125	9.8	N/A
Turnout		1,285	84.2	−10.2
Registered electors		1,526		
Liberal gain from Conservative		Swing	+7.4	

=== Elections in the 1860s ===
General election 1868: Poole
Party	Candidate	Votes	%	±%
Conservative	Arthur Guest	623	52.5	+26.5
Liberal	Charles Waring	563	47.5	−26.5
Majority		60	5.0	N/A
Turnout		1,186	94.4	+11.7
Registered electors		1,256		
Conservative gain from Liberal		Swing	+26.5	

- Seat reduced to one member.

General election 1865: Poole
Party	Candidate	Votes	%	±%
Liberal	Henry Danby Seymour	258	37.7	+2.2
Liberal	Charles Waring	248	36.3	+10.0
Conservative	Stephen Lewin	178	26.0	−12.2
Majority		70	10.3	N/A
Turnout		431 (est)	82.7 (est)	+14.7
Registered electors		521		
Liberal hold		Swing	+4.2	
Liberal gain from Conservative		Swing	+8.1	

=== Elections in the 1850s ===
General election 1859: Poole
Party	Candidate	Votes	%	±%
Conservative	George Woodroffe Franklyn	208	38.2	+0.2
Liberal	Henry Danby Seymour	193	35.5	−6.9
Liberal	William Taylor Haly	143	26.3	+6.6
Majority		15	2.8	−15.5
Turnout		376 (est)	68.0 (est)	+21.8
Registered electors		553		
Conservative hold		Swing	+0.2	
Liberal hold		Swing	−3.5	

General election 1857: Poole
Party	Candidate	Votes	%	±%
Whig	Henry Danby Seymour	211	42.4	N/A
Conservative	George Woodroffe Franklyn	189	38.0	N/A
Radical	William Taylor Haly	98	19.7	N/A
Turnout		249 (est)	46.2 (est)	N/A
Registered electors		539		
Majority		22	4.4	N/A
Whig hold		Swing	N/A	
Majority		91	18.3	N/A
Conservative hold		Swing	N/A	

General election 1852: Poole
Party	Candidate	Votes	%	±%
Whig	Henry Danby Seymour	Unopposed		
Conservative	George Woodroffe Franklyn	Unopposed		
Registered electors		508		
Whig hold				
Conservative gain from Peelite				

By-election, 24 September 1850: Poole
Party	Candidate	Votes	%	±%
Whig	Henry Danby Seymour	187	52.8	−6.4
Conservative	John Savage	167	47.2	+13.6
Majority		20	5.6	−17.9
Turnout		354	71.1	+2.6
Registered electors		498		
Whig gain from Peelite		Swing	−10.0	

- Caused by Robinson's death.

=== Elections in the 1840s ===
General election 1847: Poole
Party	Candidate	Votes	%	±%
Peelite	George Richard Robinson	240	33.6	+3.6
Whig	George Philips	220	30.8	−2.6
Whig	Edward John Hutchins	203	28.4	−8.2
Radical	Montague Merryweather Turner	52	7.3	N/A
Turnout		358 (est)	68.5 (est)	−18.9
Registered electors		522		
Majority		20	2.8	N/A
Peelite gain from Whig		Swing	+7.2	
Majority		168	23.5	+20.1
Whig hold		Swing	−2.2	

General election 1841: Poole
Party	Candidate	Votes	%	±%
Whig	Charles Ponsonby	231	36.6	+8.8
Whig	George Philips	211	33.4	+7.5
Conservative	George Pitt Rose	189	30.0	−16.4
Majority		22	3.4	+1.7
Turnout		410 (est)	87.4 (est)	c. +9.3
Registered electors		469		
Whig hold		Swing	+8.5	
Whig hold		Swing	+7.9	

=== Elections in the 1830s ===
General election 1837: Poole
Party	Candidate	Votes	%	±%
Whig	Charles Ponsonby	278	27.8	−10.9
Whig	George Philips	259	25.9	−7.6
Conservative	Henry Willoughby	242	24.2	+4.2
Conservative	John Walsh	222	22.2	+14.5
Majority		17	1.7	−11.8
Turnout		504	78.1	c. +12.1
Registered electors		645		
Whig hold		Swing	−10.1	
Whig hold		Swing	−8.5	

By-election, 21 May 1835: Poole
Party	Candidate	Votes	%	±%
Whig	George Byng	199	53.4	−18.8
Conservative	Colquhoun Grant	174	46.6	+18.9
Majority		25	6.8	−6.7
Turnout		373	82.9	c. +16.9
Registered electors		450		
Whig hold		Swing	−18.9	

- Caused by John Byng's elevation to the peerage, becoming 1st Earl of Strafford

General election 1835: Poole
Party	Candidate	Votes	%	±%
Whig	John Byng	230	38.7	+9.5
Whig	Charles Augustus Tulk	199	33.5	+7.2
Conservative	John Irving	119	20.0	N/A
Conservative	T Bonar	46	7.7	N/A
Majority		80	13.5	+10.6
Turnout		c. 297	c. 66.0	c. −21.4
Registered electors		450		
Whig hold				
Whig hold				

General election 1832: Poole
Party	Candidate	Votes	%
Whig	Benjamin Lester Lester	284	44.5
Whig	John Byng	186	29.2
Whig	Charles Augustus Tulk	168	26.3
Majority		18	2.9
Turnout		360	87.4
Registered electors		412	
Whig hold			
Whig hold			

By-election, 6 October 1831: Poole
Party	Candidate	Votes	%
Whig	John Byng	55	56.7
Whig	Charles Augustus Tulk	42	43.3
Majority		13	13.4
Turnout		97	c. 60.6
Registered electors		c. 160	
Whig hold			

- Caused by Ponsonby's resignation

General election 1831: Poole
Party	Candidate	Votes	%
Whig	Benjamin Lester Lester	Unopposed	
Whig	William Ponsonby	Unopposed	
Registered electors		c. 160	
Whig hold			
Whig hold			

General election 1830: Poole
Party	Candidate	Votes	%
Whig	Benjamin Lester Lester	Unopposed	
Whig	William Ponsonby	Unopposed	
Registered electors		c. 160	
Whig hold			
Whig hold			

== See also ==
- List of parliamentary constituencies in Dorset

== Sources ==
- Robert Beatson, A Chronological Register of Both Houses of Parliament (London: Longman, Hurst, Res & Orme, 1807)
- Cobbett's Parliamentary history of England, from the Norman Conquest in 1066 to the year 1803 (London: Thomas Hansard, 1808)
- F W S Craig, British Parliamentary Election Results 1832–1885 (2nd edition, Aldershot: Parliamentary Research Services, 1989)
- Maija Jansson (ed.), Proceedings in Parliament, 1614 (House of Commons) (Philadelphia: American Philosophical Society, 1988)
- Henry Stooks Smith, The Parliaments of England from 1715 to 1847, Volume 1 (London: Simpkin, Marshall & Co, 1844)
- Willis, Browne (1750). Notitia Parliamentaria, Part II: A Series or Lists of the Representatives in the several Parliaments held from the Reformation 1541, to the Restoration 1660 ... London. p. 1.
