= Wrotham Park =

English country house in Hertfordshire

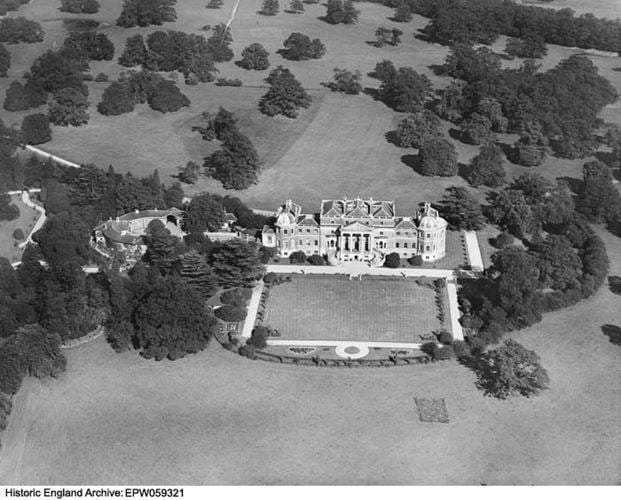
- Aerial photograph of Wrotham Park, c. 1949

- Location within Hertfordshire

General information
- Type: English country house
- Architectural style: Neo-Palladian
- Location: Near Potters Bar, Hertfordshire, England
- Coordinates: 51°40′38″N 0°11′48″W
- Completed: 1754
- Destroyed: 1883 (fire), then rebuilt
- Client: Admiral John Byng
- Owner: Robert Byng

Technical details
- Grounds: 2,500 acres (1,000 ha)

Design and construction
- Architect: Isaac Ware

Other information
- Number of rooms: 18 bedrooms

Website
- wrothampark.com

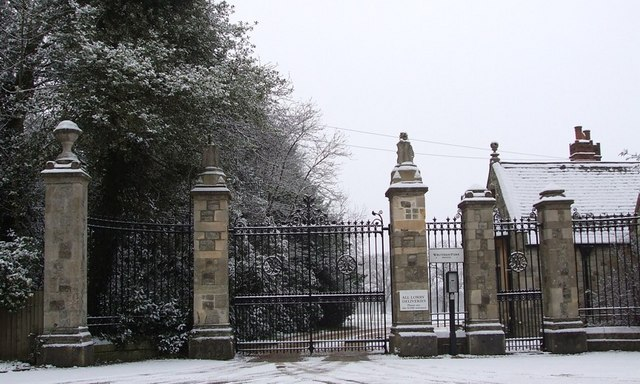
Entrance to Wrotham Park

Wrotham Park (pronounced /ˈruːtəm/, ROO-təm) is a neo-Palladian English country house in the parish of South Mimms, Hertfordshire. It lies south of the town of Potters Bar and 12.2 miles (19.6 km) north of Hyde Park Corner in central London. The house was designed by Isaac Ware in 1754 for Admiral John Byng, the fourth son of Admiral George Byng, 1st Viscount Torrington, and remains in the family at the heart of a 2,500-acre (1,000 ha) estate. It is one of the largest private houses near London inside the M25 motorway. Its distinctive exterior has been used over 60 times as a filming location.

The house is listed as a Grade II* building on the National Heritage List for England, and its landscaped park and gardens are Grade II listed on the Register of Historic Parks and Gardens.

== History ==
Originally part of an estate known as Pinchbank (also Birchbank), first recorded in Middlesex in 1310 and owned in the 17th and early 18th centuries by the Howkins family, the property passed to Thomas Reynolds, a director of the South Sea Company, who renamed the estate Strangeways. His son, Francis, sold the property to Admiral John Byng who had the house rebuilt by Isaac Ware in 1754.

Admiral John Byng changed the name of the house to Wrotham Park in honour of the original family home in Wrotham, Kent. Byng never had an opportunity to live in retirement at Wrotham. Following his inadequately equipped expedition to relieve Menorca from the French during the Seven Years' War, he was court martialled and executed in 1757. This event was satirised by Voltaire in his novel Candide. In Portsmouth, Candide witnesses the execution of an officer by firing squad; and is told that "in this country, it is wise to kill an admiral from time to time to encourage the others" (pour encourager les autres).

The house was inherited by John Byng, 1st Earl of Strafford in 1847 and passed to his son, George Byng, 2nd Earl of Strafford, on the first earl's death in 1860. A disastrous fire in 1883 burned slowly enough to permit retrieval of the contents of the house, but gutted it. The house was rebuilt exactly as it was and still remains in the hands of the Byng family.

== Filming location ==
Wrotham Park has often been used as a filming location including Hart to Hart, Top C's and Tiaras, White Mischief, Jeeves and Wooster, King Ralph (1991), Bridget Jones's Diary, Gosford Park, Peter's Friends, Vanity Fair, The Line of Beauty, Sense and Sensibility (2008), Jane Eyre, The Hour, Great Expectations, Kingsman: The Secret Service, Kingsman: The Golden Circle and The King's Man, Mr Selfridge (2014), Agatha Christie's Poirot, episodes The Adventure of Johnnie Waverly, Third Girl, The Gentlemen (2019), Downton Abbey, The Crown, Bridgerton and The Diplomat.

== See also ==
- 18th-century Western domes
