= Thomas White (died 1590) =

English politician

Thomas White (by 1517 – 1590) was an English politician.

He was a member (MP) of the parliament of England for Poole in March 1553.
