= Roger Mawdley =

Roger Mawdley (died 1630) was an English politician who was Mayor of Poole (1588-1589) and Member of Parliament for Poole (1597–1598).

== See also ==
- List of MPs elected to the English parliament in 1597
