= Charles Schreiber =

British politician (1826–1884)

- Schreiber in 1880
- Born: 10 May 1826; Colchester, England
- Died: 31 March 1884 (aged 57); Lisbon, Kingdom of Portugal
- Occupations: Academic & politician
- Spouse: Lady Charlotte Guest (m. 1855)
- Parent(s): Lieutenant-Colonel James Alfred Screiber, Mary Ware

Charles Schreiber (10 May 1826 – 31 March 1884) was an English academic, fine arts collector and Conservative Party politician who sat in the House of Commons between 1865 and 1884.

== Early life ==
Schreiber was born at Colchester, the eldest son of Lieutenant-Colonel James Alfred Schreiber of Melton, Suffolk and his wife Mary Ware, daughter of Thomas Ware, of Woodfort, County Cork. He was educated at Cheltenham College and was a scholar at Trinity College, Cambridge.

== Career ==
In 1848, he won the Browne medal at Trinity College and the Chancellor's Classical medal in 1850. In 1852, Schreiber became a Fellow of Trinity, where he was tutor to Ivor Guest.

In the 1865 general election, Schreiber was elected member of parliament (MP) for Cheltenham, but stood down in 1868. In the 1880 general election, he was elected MP Poole and held the seat until his death in 1884.

== Personal life ==
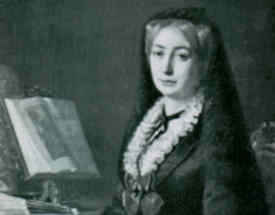
Lady Charlotte Guest

In 1855, he married Lady Charlotte Guest (1812–1895), his former pupil's mother. Lady Charlotte was the daughter of Albemarle Bertie, 9th Earl of Lindsey and widow of John Josiah Guest, 1st Baronet, the owner of Dowlais Ironworks in Wales, and a major figure in the history of Welsh literature. She was famous for her collections of china, fans and playing-cards.

Schreiber and his wife lived at Langham House, Portland Place, London. They spent many years travelling in Europe collecting ceramics and other items. Schreiber died at Lisbon at the age of 57.

=== Legacy ===
The collection of English ceramic art bearing his name was presented to the Victoria and Albert Museum.

Parliament of the United Kingdom
Preceded by Francis Berkeley	Member of Parliament for Cheltenham; 1865–1868	Succeeded by Henry Bernhard Samuelson
Preceded by Evelyn Ashley	Member of Parliament for Poole; 1880– 1884	Succeeded by William James Harris
