= William Thornhill (MP for Poole) =

16th-century English politician

William Thornhill (c. 1500 – 21 August 1557), of Thornhill in Stalbridge, Dorset, was an English politician.

== Family ==
Thornhill was the eldest son of Thomas Thornhill of Thornhill and his wife Joan née Hussey, daughter of Thomas Hussey of Shapwick. William married twice: firstly to a daughter of William Chauncy of Charlton in Wiltshire, by whom he had two sons and three daughters; secondly to Joan Brydges, daughter of Henry Brydges of Newbury, Berkshire.

== Career ==
He was a member (MP) of the parliament of England for Poole in 1529.
