= Samuel Weston (politician) =

English politician

Samuel Weston (died 1716) was an English politician who served as Member of Parliament for Poole from 1705 to 1708. He was a known loyal supporter of the Whig Junto. He later served as Mayor of Poole from 1710 to 1712.

== See also ==
- List of members of the House of Commons at Westminster 1705–1708
