= 1884 Poole by-election =

UK parliamentary by-election

The Poole by-election of 1884 was fought on 19 April 1884. The by-election was fought due to the death of the incumbent MP, Charles Schreiber. It was won by the Conservative candidate William James Harris.

== Background ==
Charles Schreiber had been elected at the 1880 general election, representing Poole, Dorset until his death in March 1884. A by-election was called for the following month.

== Result ==
The seat was retained by the Conservative Party.

By-election, 19 Apr 1884: Poole
Party	Candidate	Votes	%	±%
Conservative	William James Harris	877	51.8	+1.6
Liberal	Thomas Chatfield Clarke	815	48.2	−1.6
Majority		62	3.6	+3.2
Turnout		1,692	85.3	−3.8
Registered electors		1,983		
Conservative hold		Swing	+1.6	
