= Thomas Missing =

English politician

Member of Parliament for Poole
- In office 1741–1747

Mayor of Portsmouth
- In office 1750-1751 – 1756-1757

Personal details
- Born: 1710 Stubbington, Hampshire
- Died: 25 September 1788 (aged 77–78)

Thomas Missing (1710 – 25 September 1788) was an English politician who served as Member of Parliament for Poole from 1741 to 1747.

== Life ==
Missing was born in Stubbington, near Titchfield in Hampshire. Missing built a workhouse in Poole in 1739 at a cost of £500. He was High Sheriff of Hampshire from 1739 to 1740. He was first elected to Parliament at the 1741 British general election. He served two terms as Mayor of Portsmouth in the 1750s. He died in 1788.
