= Mayor of Poole =

Civic office in Poole, Dorset, England

The following were mayors of Poole, Dorset, England:

- 1515–16, 1521–2, 1530–1, 1536–7, 1543–4: William Biddlecombe
- 1597–1598: Roger Mawdley
- 1697–8, 1703–4, 1704–5: William Phippard
- 1779; 1781–1783: Benjamin Lester
- 1798: John Jeffery
- 1824; 1830: John Bingley Garland
- 2016: Xena Dion 5
- 2018: Sean Gabriel
- 2019, 2020: Marion Le Poidevin
- 2021: Julie Bagwell
- 2022: Tony Trent
