= John Dent (died 1826) =

English banker and politician

John Dent (21 August 1761 – 14 November 1826) was an English banker and politician.

== Life ==
He was the eldest son of Robert Dent, a banker in London and Clapham.

He was a partner in Child's Bank and a Tory member of parliament for Lancaster from 1790 to 1812. He was a defeated candidate at Poole in 1812 but was returned to Parliament there in 1818 and again, unopposed, in 1822.

Dent earned the nickname "Dog Dent" for his interest in the Dog Tax Bill of 1796. He was also known as a book collector and a member of the Roxburghe Club.

He was elected a Fellow of the Royal Society in 1811 and a Fellow of the Society of Antiquaries of London.

He died in 1826 at his Mayfair home in London.

== Family ==
Dent married Anne Jane Williamson of Roby Hall, Liverpool, in 1800; they had five sons and five daughters.
