= William Phippard =

English politician

Sir William Phippard (c. 1649 – 23 January 1723) was an English Whig politician. He served as Mayor of Poole in Dorset, and also served as the towns Member of Parliament.

== Life ==
He was elected Mayor of Poole in 1697.

He was elected to Parliament, in the constituency of Poole in 1698, listed as a member of the Country Party and served in the 4th Parliament of King William III.

He was knighted on 8 February 1699.

He was re-elected in 1702.

He lost his seat at the 1708 general election.

He returned to parliament at the 1710 general election, and stood down at the 1713 general election.
