= William Morton Pitt =

British politician

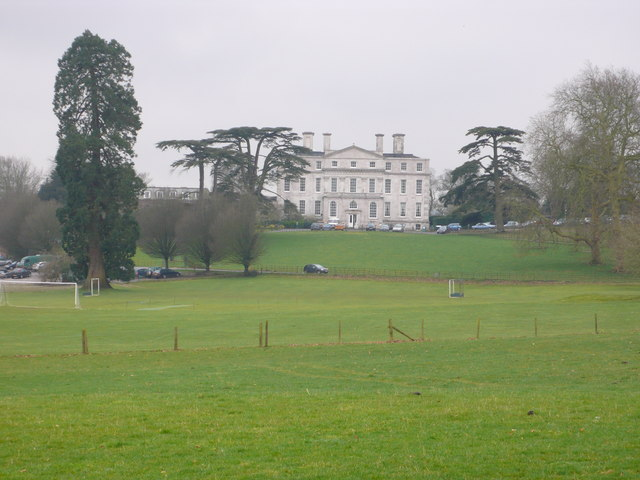
Kingston Maurward House, the home of William Morton Pitt

William Morton Pitt, FRS (16 May 1754 – 28 February 1836) was a British Member of Parliament.

He was the eldest son of John Pitt of Encombe House, Dorset and educated at Queen's College, Oxford. He entered Lincoln's Inn to study law in 1774.

In 1780 he was returned to Parliament as the Member for Poole, which he represented until 1790 after which he represented Dorset from 1790 to 1826.

He was elected a Fellow of the Royal Society in 1787.

He died in 1836. He had married twice: firstly Margaret, the daughter of John Gambier, Governor of the Bahamas, with whom he had a daughter, and secondly Grace Amelia, the daughter of Henry Seymour of Hanford, Dorset, with whom he had two sons and a daughter. Pitt's library was sold by auction by R. H. Evans in London on 9 May 1838 (and five following days). A copy of the catalogue is held at Cambridge University Library (shelfmark Munby.c.144e(4)).
