= Charles Augustus Tulk =

English Swedenborgian and politician

Charles Augustus Tulk (1786–1849) was an English Swedenborgian and politician.

== Life ==
The eldest son of John Augustus Tulk, he was born at Richmond, Surrey, on 2 June 1786. His father, a man of independent fortune, was an original member of the Theosophical Society formed (December 1783) by Robert Hindmarsh for the study of Emanuel Swedenborg's writings. Tulk was educated at Westminster School, of which he became captain, and was noted for his singing in the abbey choir. He was elected a king's scholar in 1801, and matriculated as a scholar at Trinity College, Cambridge, in 1806.

Reaching age 21 in 1807, Tulk had settled on him part of his father's estate in the area of Leicester Square in London. He sold the garden in the Square in 1808; forty years later this action led to the leading case Tulk v Moxhay on restrictive covenants. Leaving university, he began to read for the bar, and entered Lincoln's Inn. Having private means, he married and followed no profession. For a period he lived at Marble Hill House (1812–17), and then moved to Totteridge Park in Hertfordshire.

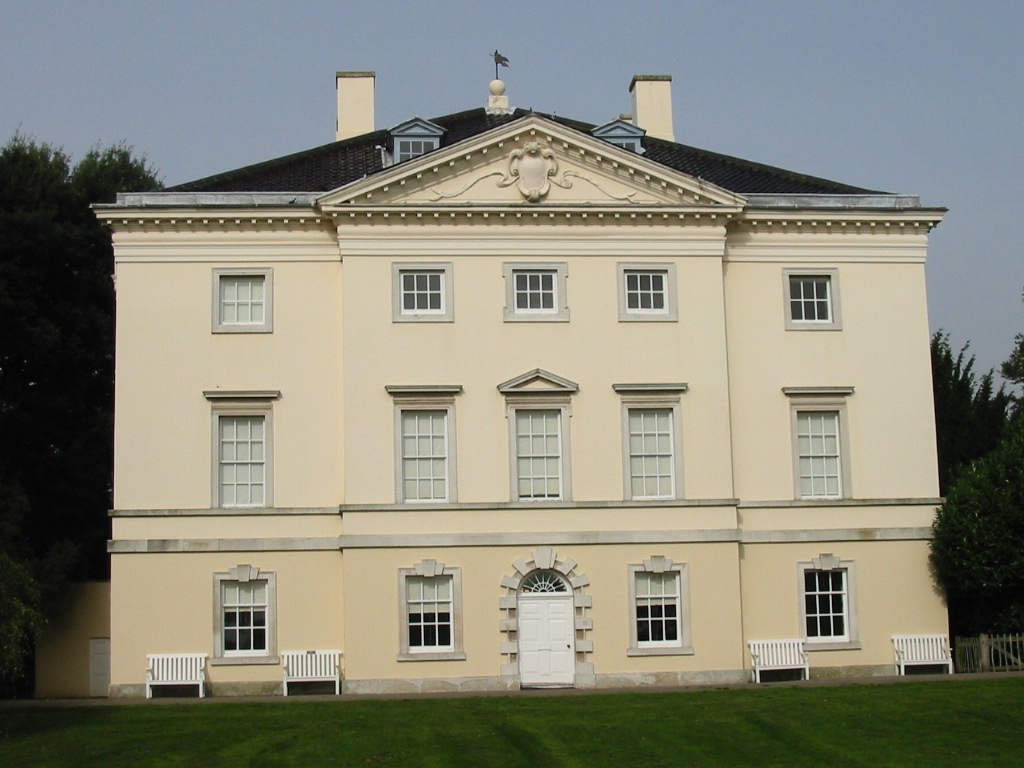
Marble Hill House today.

== Swedenborgian ==
In 1810 he assisted, with John Flaxman, in founding the London society for publishing Swedenborg's works, served on its committee till 1843, and often presided at its annual dinners. John Spurgin projected an edition of Swedenborg, but only the Economy of the Animal Kingdom was published.

Tulk never joined the New Church or had any connection with its conference. After leaving Cambridge he rarely attended public worship, but conducted a service in his own family, using no prayer but the paternoster. He became connected with the "Hawkstone meeting", projected by George Harrison, translator of many of Swedenborg's Latin treatises, fostered by John Clowes and held annually in July for over fifty years from 1806, in an inn at Hawkstone Park, Shropshire. Tulk presided in 1814, and at intervals till 1830.

== Social and political issues ==
Tulk took part in efforts for bettering the condition of factory hands, aiding the movement by newspaper articles. He was returned to parliament for Sudbury on 7 March 1820, and retained his seat till 1826; later, on 7 January 1835, he was returned for Poole, retiring from parliament at the dissolution in 1837. His political views brought him into close friendship with Joseph Hume. Hume's daughter Mary Catherine Hume-Rothery, a campaigner for medical reform, became a Swedenborgian under Tulk's influence, and in 1850 wrote a work of advocacy to Swedenborgians based on Tulk's life and heterodox views.

Tulk was an active county magistrate for Middlesex (1836–47), and took special interest in the management of prisons and asylums, acting (1839–47) as chairman of committee of the Hanwell asylum. He was an opponent of capital punishment.

== Science, literature and mysticism ==
Tulk elaborated a rational mysticism, which he found below the surface of Swedenborg's writings, as their underlying religious philosophy. He turned to physical science, particularly to chemistry and physiology, partly to combat materialism on its own ground. He was elected a Fellow of the Royal Society in 1822.

Tulk corresponded with Johann Caspar Spurzheim. His interest in phrenology led him to act as President for the London Phrenological Society in the 1820s and 1830s. He also associated with Samuel Taylor Coleridge, whom he met at Littlehampton in 1817; Tulk was one of the recognised group of close disciples, with Thomas Allsop, Henry Francis Cary, John Hookham Frere and Joseph Henry Green. Coleridge's letters to Tulk are a source for his developed thoughts on a system of nature. In 1818 Tulk involved Coleridge in his political agitation, leading up to the Cotton Mills, etc. Act 1819; Tulk offered funding for a pamphlet, and Coleridge wrote several.

Tulk was a patron of William Blake, and took Coleridge to see one of Blake's pictures. Blake made drawings for Tulk, now untraced. When Allan Cunningham's Life of Blake appeared, there was an anonymous review sympathetic to Blake in the London University Magazine; Tulk has been suggested as the author, by Geoffrey Keynes and others. Elizabeth Barrett Browning learned something of Blake through knowing Tulk.

== Last years ==
In 1847 Tulk went to Italy, returning in the autumn of 1848. He died at 25 Craven Street, London, on 16 January 1849, and was buried in Brompton cemetery.

== Works ==
Tulk contributed for some years to the Intellectual Repository, started in 1812 under the editorship of Samuel Noble. His separate publications were:

- The Record of Family Instruction (1832; revised, 1889, as The Science of Correspondency, by Charles Pooley);
- an exposition of the Lord's Prayer (1842); and
- Aphorisms (1843).

His papers in the New Church Advocate (1846) were much controverted. He began the serial publication of a major work, Spiritual Christianity (1846–47), but did not live to finish it.

== Family ==
Tulk married (September 1807) Susannah Hart (d. October 1824), daughter of a London merchant, and had twelve children, of whom five sons and two daughters survived him. The eldest son was Augustus H. Tulk. The Leicester Square property was divided seven ways among the children, and some remained in the family until 1947. The aftermath of the Tulk v Moxhay legal case affected Wyld's Great Globe in the Square; but an agreement was reached under which John Augustus Tulk, one of the sons, would be able to buy back half of the Square. His development plans caused a furore; and Albert Grant bought him out, to present the whole Square as a public park to the Metropolitan Board of Works.
