= John Jeffery (MP) =

British politician

John Jeffrey (1751 – 18 May 1822) was an English politician who was an MP for Poole in Dorset from 1796 to 1809.

== Life ==
Jeffrey was Mayor of Poole in 1798.

He served in the last Parliament of Great Britain and the First Parliament of the United Kingdom.

He died in Lisbon, Portugal, in 1822 and was buried in the British Cemetery there.
