= Charles Ponsonby =

Charles Ponsonby may refer to:

- Charles Ponsonby, 2nd Baron de Mauley (1815–1896), British peer and Liberal politician
- Sir Charles Ponsonby, 1st Baronet (1879–1966), British Conservative politician, grandson of the 2nd Baron de Mauley
- Sir Charles Ponsonby, 3rd Baronet (born 1951), grandson of the 1st Baronet
