= Army and Navy Club =

Private club in London, England

Coordinates: 51.5063°N 0.1357°W

- Nickname: The Rag
- Founded: 1837; 189 years ago
- Type: Private members' club
- Purpose: Private members club, founded for British Army and Royal Navy officers
- Location: 36–39 Pall Mall, London, England (since 1851)
- Members: Military officers (and some non-military members)
- Website: therag.co.uk

The Army and Navy Club, commonly known as The Rag, is a private members' club in London that was founded in 1837 for officers of the British Army, the Royal Navy and the Royal Marines. The club offers military membership to those who hold or have held a commission in the British Armed Forces or in Commonwealth Forces. In addition, the club now accepts applications for non-military membership.

== Foundation and membership ==
The club was founded by Lieutenant-General Sir Edward Barnes (1776–1838) in 1837. His proposal was to establish an Army Club, with all officers of the British Army (on full or half pay) eligible for membership. However, when The Duke of Wellington was asked to be a patron, he refused unless membership was also offered to officers of the Royal Navy and the Royal Marines, and this was agreed.

On 28 August 1837, a meeting representing the various services took place, to elect a committee and to settle the new club's rules. Sir Edward Barnes died on 19 March 1838, just two weeks before the first general meeting of the club.

By 1851, the club was in a strong position, with sixteen hundred members and a waiting list of 834. This pressure led to the founding of the separate Naval and Military Club in 1862.

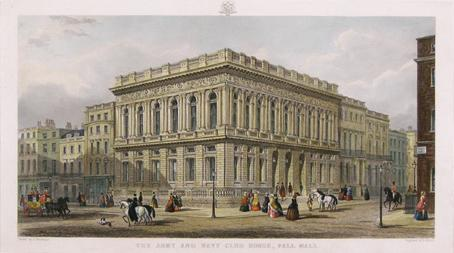
Army and Navy Club House, Pall Mall, engraving from The Stationers Company's Almanac for 1875

Charles Dickens Jr. reported in Dickens's Dictionary of London (1879):

Army and Navy Club, Pall Mall. — Is instituted for the association of commissioned officers of all ranks in Her Majesty’s Regular Army, Royal Navy, and Royal Marines. Election by ballot in club meeting. Thirty members must actually vote, and one black ball in ten excludes. Entrance fee, £40; subscription, £7 7S. for old members; but the following resolution was carried at the annual meeting of the club on the 3rd June, 1878: "All new members who are elected to the club, commencing with the next ballot, shall pay an annual subscription at £10 10s."

According to the Encyclopædia Britannica article "Club", in 1902,

The largest income ... may be stated to be that of the Army and Navy club, which in the year 1875 amounted to £30,813, of which £19,383 was raised by entrance fees and subscriptions alone. The expenditure is, however, most commonly of nearly equal amount, and of few of the clubs can it be said that they are entirely free from debt. The number of members included in a London club varies from 2200 in the Army and Navy to 475 in the St James's club.

Membership of the Army and Navy Club is now offered also to members of Commonwealth armed services, to members' immediate families and to individuals who have no service background who are nominated and seconded by existing members. There are some female members.

As of 2011, the membership subscription costs between £223 and £465 per year, with a £130 rate for younger members (under 29); there are reduced rates for spouses and a rate for family membership. There are joining fees.

== Premises ==
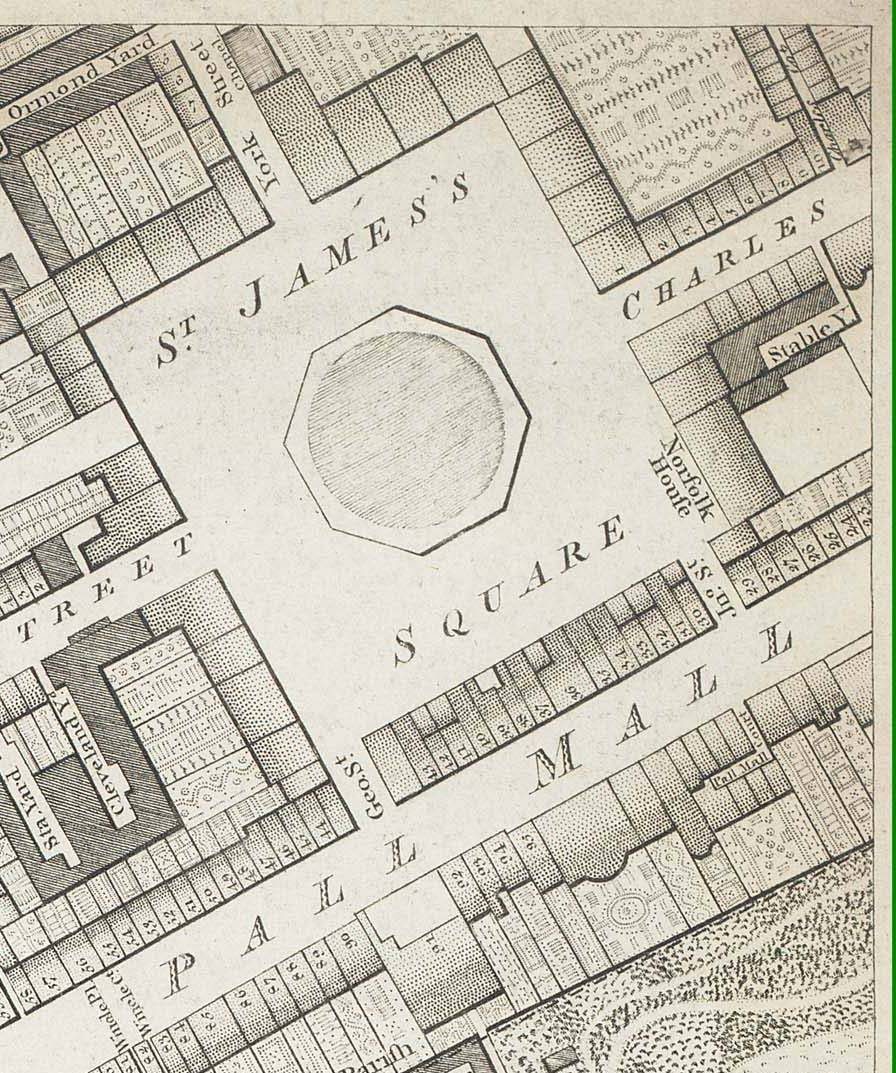
A map of St James's Square and Pall Mall in 1799

=== Site ===
The club's first home was at 18, St James's Square, at the north corner with King Street. This house was vacated by the Oxford and Cambridge Club when it moved into its new club house in Pall Mall. A lease was taken and the club opened its doors early in 1838.

In 1843, the club began to search for a site to build a purpose-built club house. In 1846, it moved to larger premises called Lichfield House, now 15, St James's Square.

In 1846–1847, the club bought six adjacent freehold houses in Pall Mall, St James's Square, and George Street, at the west corner of Pall Mall and George Street, for a total of £48,770. Of this, £19,500 was paid for Lord de Mauley's house on the west side of St James's Square dating from the 1670s, immediately opposite Norfolk House. It would now have been Number 22, St James's Square, if it had survived. The St James's Square site was granted on 24 March 1672/3 by Henry Jermyn, 1st Earl of St Albans and Baptist May to trustees for Edward Shaw. In October 1673, they sold the land and the house which had been built on it to the actress Moll Davis, a mistress of King Charles II, for £1800. This house (which was surveyed by John Soane in 1799) was almost square and had three storeys, each with four evenly-spaced windows, all dressed with a wide architrave and cornice. The staircase hall was south of a large room in front, and two smaller rooms and a secondary staircase at the rear. There was a massive cross-wall, containing the fireplaces of the back rooms. In 1749, John Hobart, 1st Earl of Buckinghamshire, sold the house to Thomas Brand of Hertfordshire for £4500, whose son sold it in 1799 to Samuel Thornton, a director of the Bank of England. In 1818, Thornton sold the house for £11,000 to the Whig politician W. S. Ponsonby, later Baron de Mauley, who sold it to the Army and Navy Club in October 1846 for £19,500. It was demolished in 1847, having survived longer than any other of the other original houses in the square.

=== Club houses ===
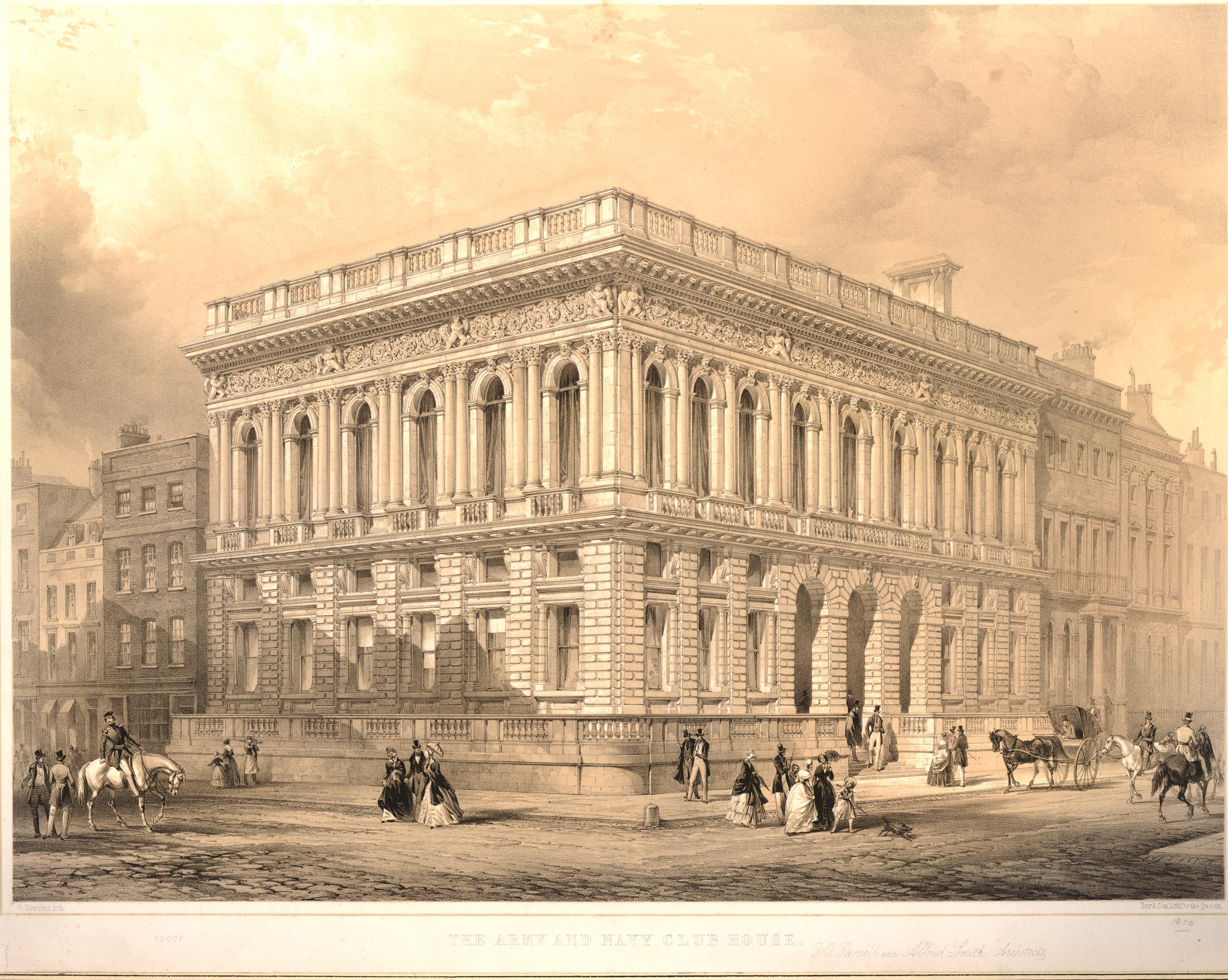
The club's original building

It was reported in January 1847 that the club would hold an open competition for the design of its planned new building, with prizes of £200 and £100 for the two best entrants. The club committee initially chose a design by the sporting artist George Tattersall, of St James's Street, who planned a two-storey classical building with Corinthian columns and a crowning balustrade ending with martial trophies and a Doric entrance portico of three bays. As well as various statues in niches, over the portico he drew a pedestal with bas-reliefs, surmounted by lions and a group symbolising Britannia and Neptune. This choice was confirmed by a ballot of the club members in April 1847. However, The Builder pilloried the choice, pointing out that "the space devoted to the purposes of the club is very meagre, indeed quite insufficient". The club held an extraordinary general meeting on 11 May 1847 and decided to buy another house in Pall Mall to make its site larger, and also to hold another competition. As a result, a design by C. O. Parnell and Alfred Smith was chosen, an essay in the Venetian Renaissance style of the early sixteenth century, imitating Venice's Palazzo Corner della Ca' Grande.

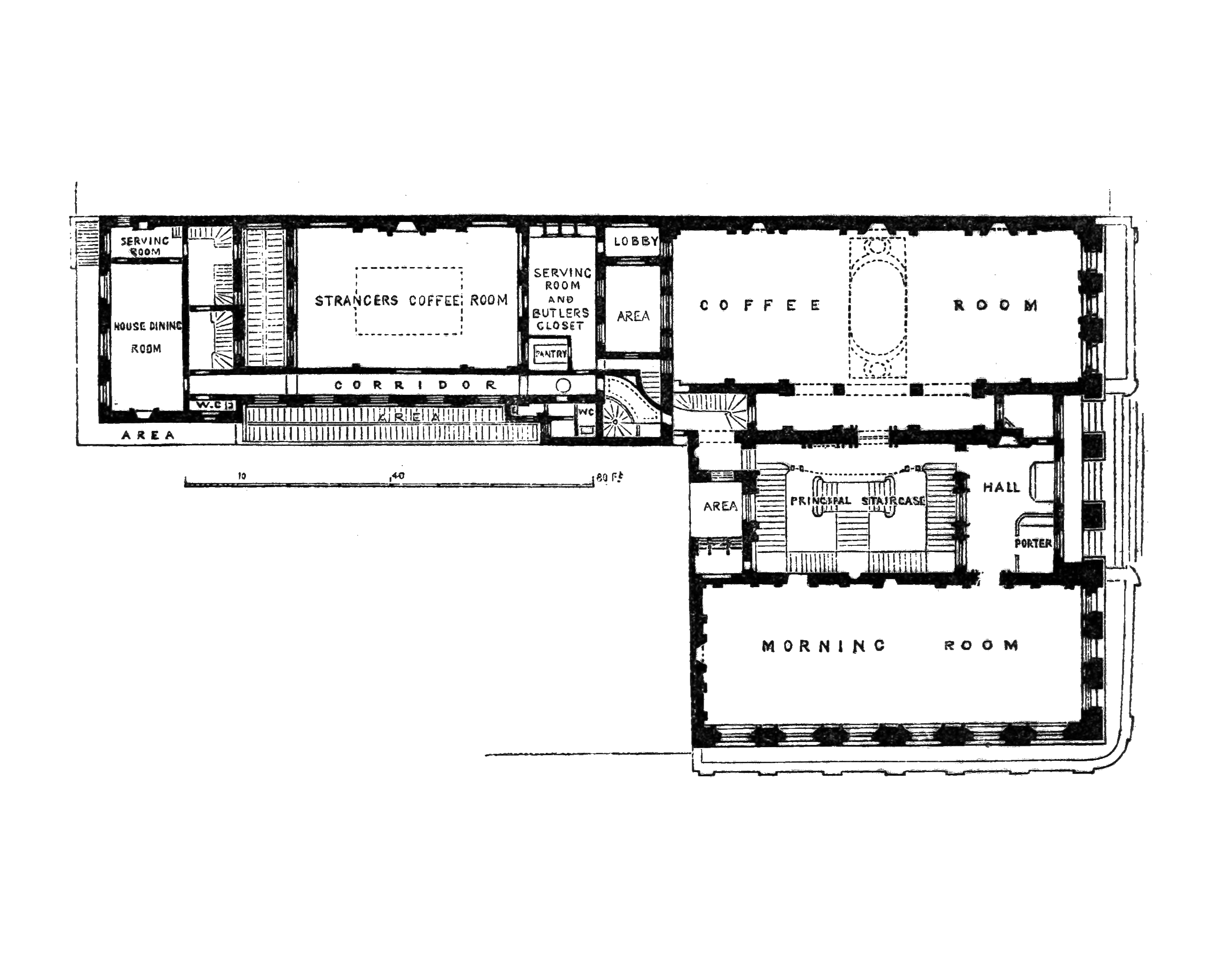
Floor plan of the 1847 clubhouse

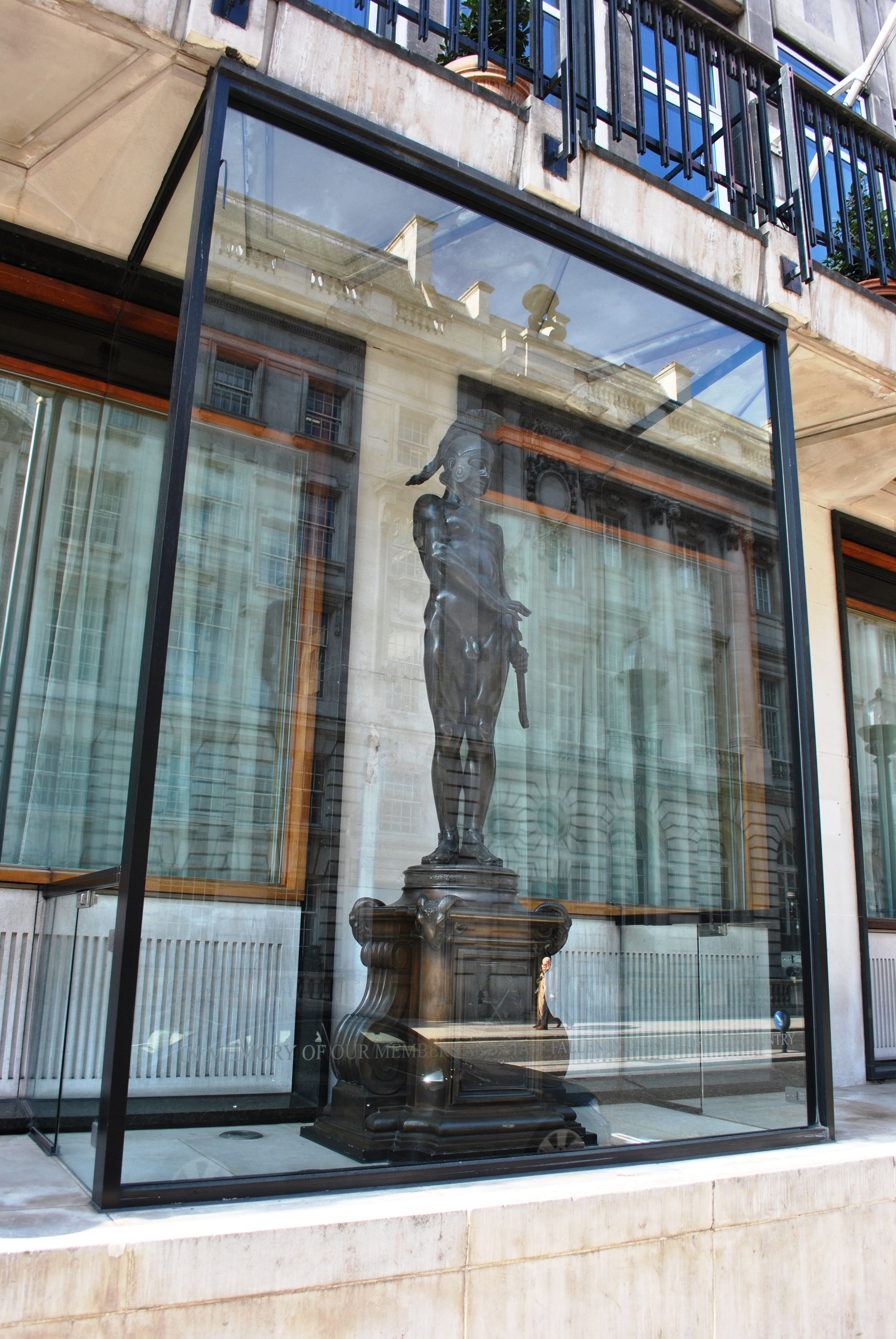
Outside statue

Building began in March 1848, William Trego having contracted to deliver the club house structure for £19,656. The foundation stone was laid on 6 May 1848 by the chairman of the committee, Lt-Col. Daniell. In August 1849 Messrs. Smith and Appleford were instructed to equip the building for £15,671, and the club-house was opened on 25 February 1851. The club was faced with Caen stone, but this decayed, and in 1886 the bad stone had to be cut out and replaced with Portland. An early description of the new club house appears in John Timbs's Curiosities of London (1855) -

ARMY AND NAVY CLUB-HOUSE, Pall Mall, corner of George-street, designed by Parnell and Smith, was opened February 1851. The exterior is a combination from Sansovino's Palazzo Cornaro, and Library of St. Mark at Venice; but varying in the upper part, which has Corinthian columns, with windows resembling arcades filling up the intercolumns; and over their ached headings are groupes of naval and military symbols, weapons, and defensive armour – very picturesque. The frieze has also effective groupes symbolic of the army and navy; the cornice, likewise very bold, is crowned by a massive balustrade. The basement, from the Cornaro, is rusticated; the entrance being in the centre of the east or George-street front, by three open arches, similar in character to those in the Strand front of Somerset House. The whole is extremely rich in ornamental detail. The hall is fine; the coffee-room, 82 feet (25 m) by 39 feet (12 m), is panelled with scagliola, and has a ceiling enriched with flowers, and pierced for ventilation by heated flues above; adjoining is a room lighted by a glazed plafond; next is the house dining-room, decorated in the Munich style; and more superb is the morning room, with its arched windows, and mirrors forming arcades and vistas innumerable. A magnificent stone staircase leads to the library and evening rooms; and in the third story are billiard and card rooms; and a smoking room, with a lofty dome elaborately decorated in traceried Moresque. The apartments are adorned with an equestrian portrait of Queen Victoria, painted by Grant, R.A. A piece of Gobelin tapestry (Sacrifice to Diana), presented to the Club in 1849 by Prince Louis Napoleon; marble busts of William IV and the Dukes of Kent and Cambridge; and several life-size portraits of naval and military heroes. The Club-house is provided with twenty lines of Whishaw's Telekouphona, or Speaking Telegraph, which communicate from the Secretary's room to the various apartments. The cost of this superb edifice, exclusive of fittings, was 35,000l; the plot of ground on which it stands cost the Club 52,000l.

In 1857, a stained-glass window was installed in the inner hall to commemorate members killed in the Crimean War, with tablets bearing the badge of the club and details of the battles of the war. The names of the fallen were inscribed in gold letters on marble architraves. The window was moved in 1925 and 1927, due to rebuilding.

In 1878–79, a new dining-room built, the smoking-room was enlarged, and the club-house was renovated, all by H. R. Gough.

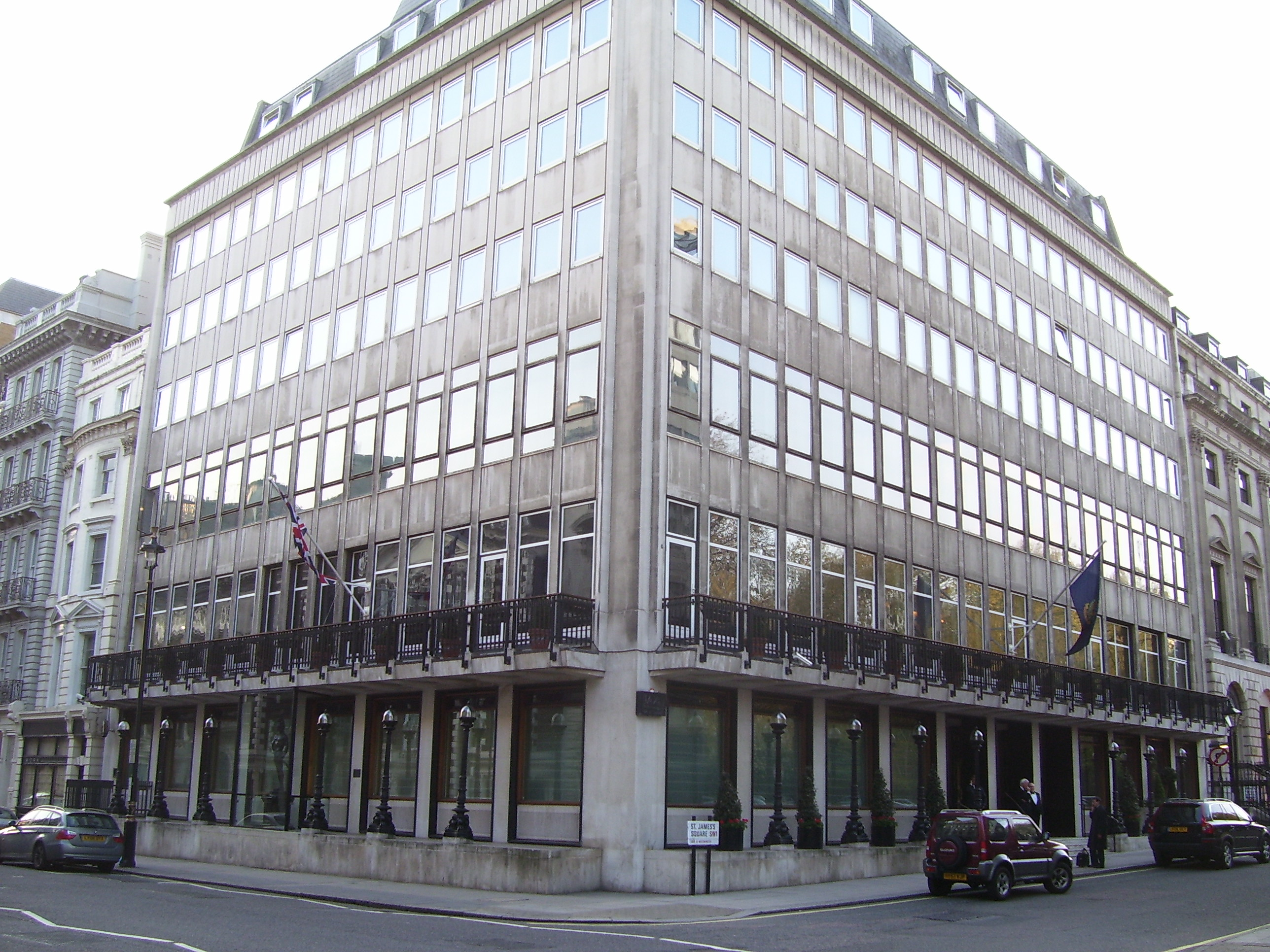
The 1963 clubhouse, designed by Thomas Bennett

Demand for bedrooms increased, and in 1919 the club bought numbers 46, 46a and 47, Pall Mall, subject to existing short leases, later adding to them 7, Rose and Crown Yard (just north of 47, Pall Mall) in 1924. A new building was designed by C. W. Ferrier and work on it began late in 1924. The old smoking-room was demolished and a new one built, a new kitchen constructed, and the exterior stone of the old club house was renovated. The new house, which connected with the back of the club house at the end of the new smoking-room, provided a squash court, a ladies' drawing-room and dining-room, and shop premises, as well as bedrooms. The club house was closed to members for a year, between August 1925 and July 1926, and the cost of the whole scheme was £167,471. Work was finished in March 1927.

The historic club house was replaced by the present mid-twentieth century building, opened 1963, described on the club's web site as "a modern purpose built building extending to almost 80,000 square feet (7,400 m^{2}), on ten floors which includes its own underground garage".

== Presidents ==
- 1838-1841: Arthur Wellesley, 1st Duke of Wellington
- 1841-1845: Admiral Sir Philip Durham
- 1845-1850: Prince Adolphus, Duke of Cambridge

== Notable members ==
- Field Marshal the Duke of Cambridge (1819–1904)
- Sir Arthur Otway, 3rd Baronet MP (1822–1912)
- Admiral of the Fleet Sir Algernon McLennan Lyons (1833–1908)
- Field Marshal Sir George Stuart White (1835–1912)
- Field Marshal Sir Evelyn Wood (1838–1919)
- Field Marshal Lord Grenfell (1841–1925)
- Henry Brudenell-Bruce, 5th Marquess of Ailesbury (1842–1911)
- Field Marshal Lord Nicholson (1845–1918)
- Admiral of the Fleet Sir John de Robeck, 1st Baronet (1862–1928)
- Field-Marshal Lord Birdwood (1865–1951)
- Field-Marshal Sir Claud Jacob (1863–1948)
- General Sir William Peyton (1866–1931), died suddenly at the club on 14 November 1931
- Marshal of the Royal Air Force Lord Trenchard (1873–1956)
- Admiral of the Fleet Lord Chatfield (1873–1967)
- Field Marshal Sir Cyril Deverell (1874–1947)
- Air Chief Marshal Sir Robert Brooke-Popham (1878–1953)
- Field Marshal Lord Alanbrooke (1883–1963)
- Field Marshal Sir Claude Auchinleck (1884–1981)
- Field Marshal Lord Gort (1886–1946)
- Tracy Philipps (1888–1959), Intelligence Officer and Secretary-General of International Union for Conservation of Nature
- Field Marshal Lord Harding of Petherton (1896–1989)
- Admiral of the Fleet Sir Varyl Begg (1908–1995)
- Lord Thorneycroft (1909–1994), Chancellor of the Exchequer
- Field Marshal Sir Geoffrey Baker (1912–1980)
- Sir Gerald Nabarro MP (1913–1973)
- Admiral of the Fleet Lord Hill-Norton (1915–2004)
- Field Marshal Lord Bramall (1923–2019)
- Brigadier Robert Hall, (1939–2016)
- Christopher Hibbert MC (1924–2008), author
- Admiral of the Fleet Lord Fieldhouse (1928–1992)
- Field Marshal Lord Inge (1935–2022)
- Admiral of the Fleet Sir Benjamin Bathurst (born 1936)
- Sir Arthur Gooch, 14th Baronet (born 1937), C.O. The Life Guards
- Lord Robertson of Port Ellen (born 1946), Secretary General of NATO 1999-2004
- General Lord Dannatt (born 1950) Chief of the General Staff

== See also ==
- List of members' clubs in London
