= Ponsonby baronets =

Baronetcy in the Baronetage of the United Kingdom

The Ponsonby baronetcy, of Wootton in the County of Oxford, is a title in the Baronetage of the United Kingdom. It was created on 27 January 1956 for the Conservative politician Charles Ponsonby.

== History ==
The first Baronet, Charles Ponsonby, represented the constituency of Sevenoaks in the House of Commons from 1935 to 1950. During the Second World War Ponsonby also served as Parliamentary Private Secretary to the Foreign Secretary Anthony Eden from 1941 to 1945. Eden later succeeded Sir Winston Churchill as Prime Minister of the United Kingdom on 6 April 1955, and it was during Eden's term in office that Charles Ponsonby was made a Baronet.

Charles was the son of The Hon. Edwin Ponsonby, who in turn was the fifth son of Charles Ponsonby, 2nd Baron de Mauley. The Ponsonby baronets form a cadet branch of the prominent Ponsonby family, headed by the Earl of Bessborough, and are in remainder to both the Earldom of Bessborough and the Barony of de Mauley.

The 1st Baronet was succeeded by his only son Sir Ashley Ponsonby, 2nd Bt in 1976, who served as Lord Lieutenant of Oxfordshire from 1980 to 1996. Following his death in 2010, he was succeeded by his eldest son Sir Charles Ponsonby, 3rd Bt, who is also second-in-line to inherit the Barony of de Mauley.

=== Family seat ===
The family seat was the Grade II-listed Woodleys House near Woodstock, Oxfordshire until 2023. The Woodleys estate had been purchased by the 1st Baronet's father The Hon. Edwin Ponsonby in 1881, and was the home of each successive generation of the family until its sale by 3rd Baronet.

== List of Ponsonby baronets, of Wootton (1956) ==
- Sir Charles Edward Ponsonby, 1st Baronet (1879–1976)
- Sir Ashley Charles Gibbs Ponsonby, 2nd Baronet KCVO, MC (1921–2010)
- Sir Charles Ashley Ponsonby, 3rd Baronet (born 1951)

The heir apparent is the present holder's son, Arthur Ashley Ponsonby (born 1984).
The heir apparent's heir-in-line is his son, Felix Thomas Charles Ponsonby (born 2022).

== See also ==
- Earl of Bessborough
- Baron de Mauley
- Baron Ponsonby of Imokilly
- Baron Ponsonby of Shulbrede
- Baron Sysonby

== Sources ==
- Kidd, Charles, Williamson, David (editors). Debrett's Peerage and Baronetage (1990 edition). New York: St Martin's Press, 1990,
- Leigh Rayment's list of baronets
