= Fair Trials =

UK-registered non-governmental organization

- Founded: 1992 by Stephen Jakobi
- Type: Non-profit; NGO
- Headquarters: London, United Kingdom
- Location: Global
- Services: Protecting and upholding fair trial rights, according to internationally recognised standards of justice
- Fields: Direct-appeal campaigns, research, lobbying
- Key people: Norman L Reimer (Global CEO)
- Website: www.fairtrials.org

Fair Trials is a UK-registered non-governmental organization which works for fair trials according to international standards of justice and the right to a fair trial, identifying where criminal justice is failing, alerting the world to the problems, and resolving these issues through campaigning, advocacy and strategic litigation. It also builds regional legal capacity through targeted training, mentoring and network activities, coordinating a network of criminal justice legal experts and European human rights NGOs called JUSTICIA.

== History ==
Fair Trials was founded by lawyer Stephen Jakobi in 1992 (under the name Fair Trials Abroad) as a response to the case of Karen Smith, a British citizen arrested in Thailand for drug smuggling. It now styles itself as the "global criminal justice watchdog".

== Current work ==
The areas where Fair Trials works are:

Pre-trial detention

Since 2011, Fair Trials has campaigned for international human rights standards on pre-trial detention to be more widely understood and applied in practice. This began with a 2011 report, which was followed by a 2014 report. These reports called for the adoption of EU-wide minimum standards on pre-trial detention, including:

- Ensuring that the procedure for pre-trial detention decisions complies with all aspects of the right to a fair trial;
- Not using extradition until cases are trial-ready;
- Considering the proportionality of detention and the use of alternatives to pre-trial detention;
- Ensuring detainees are given the best opportunity to prepare for trial, through safeguarding detention conditions.

Plea bargaining ('Trial waivers')

Fair Trials has researched the use of plea bargaining, also known as "trial waivers", campaigning for a "a rights-based approach" to trial waiver systems. They coordinated research across 90 countries, assessing the legal and human rights implications and providing recommendations in a report, "The Disappearing Trial".

EU defence rights

Fair Trials has been responsible for the production of detailed reports and policy briefings for EU policy-makers. It has worked for the proper implementation of EU law, through strategic litigation and training and has helped people access local expertise by producing "Notes of Advice" on criminal proceedings and justice systems in Europe. Additionally, Fair Trials set up the Legal Experts Advisory Panel (LEAP), which is an EU-wide network of experts in criminal justice and human rights working to promote fair and effective judicial cooperation within Europe, as well as informing the EU's work on criminal justice.

Extradition reform

Fair Trials' work in this area has been focused on campaigning to reform the European Arrest Warrant, a fast-track system for surrendering people from one EU country to another.

Fair Trials has highlighted a number of cases which demonstrate that the European Arrest Warrant system is jeopardising the right to a fair trial. In particular, Fair Trials alleges that:

- European Arrest Warrants have been issued many years after the alleged offence was committed.
- Once warrants have been issued there is no effective way of removing them, even after extradition has been refused.
- They have been used to send people to another EU member state to serve a prison sentence resulting from an unfair trial.
- Warrants have been used to force a person to face trial when the charges are based on evidence obtained by police brutality.
- Sometimes people surrendered under an Arrest Warrant have to spend months or even years in detention before they can appear in court to establish their innocence.

Interpol

Interpol systems, particularly its international "wanted person" alerts ("Red Notices") can be abused in order to persecute refugees, journalists and peaceful political demonstrators worldwide.

In 2013, Fair Trials released a report which identified two major areas for INTERPOL reform:

1. Protection from abuse of Interpol's tools by member countries, and
2. Creation of a more fair and transparent process for individuals who are challenging data that has been processed by INTERPOL.

Fair Trials has met with Interpol on multiple occasions as part of an ongoing dialogue between the two organisations to prevent the abuse of its systems.

In a follow-up report, Fair Trials outlined a series of further reforms which Fair Trials holds to be necessary in order to ensure protection of INTERPOL’s systems against abuse.

== Casework ==
In its early years, Fair Trials used to provide case support, assisting around 500 individuals each year and provide assistance in approximately 50 cases at any one time. It used a network of lawyers and diplomatic, political and media contacts to advocate on behalf of clients. It did not charge clients for the service it offers.

Fair Trials provided assistance on several high-profile cases including the case of English nanny Louise Woodward who, in 1997, was arrested in America for murder, after the death of a baby in her care. Woodward was found guilty of second degree murder, although her sentence was reduced on appeal as the court found that there was no malice in Louise's actions and that "allowing this defendant on this evidence to remain convicted of second-degree murder would be a miscarriage of justice." In 2007, 10 years later, the key prosecution witness reversed his evidence stating: "the science we have today could, in fact, have exonerated Louise. There is certainly, in retrospect, reasonable doubt."

Other high-profile, notable cases include

Ian Stillman: In August 2000, deaf charity worker Ian Stillman was arrested in India for smuggling 20 kilograms of cannabis after the drug was found in a shared taxi. He has always maintained his innocence. Fair Trials campaigned for his release and in 2002 he was finally released after spending two years in prison.

Greek Plane Spotters: In November 2001, a group of 12 British and two Dutch plane spotters were arrested on charges of espionage after taking notes during an open day at a Greek Air Force base. They were found guilty in 2002. The Greek courts overturned the conviction on appeal.

Ghana Girls: In July 2007, two 16-year-old girls, Yetunde Diya and Yasemin Vatansever, were arrested for possession of six kilograms of cocaine at Accra airport in Ghana. The girls claimed they did not know they were carrying drugs. With help from Fair Trials International (as it was then known), the girls received only a one-year prison sentence instead of the maximum three-year sentence.

Andrew Symeou: In July 2008, British student Andrew Symeou stood wrongly accused of killing a holiday maker on a Greek island. Although evidence against him was deeply flawed and his innocence could be proven, he was extradited to Greece on a European Arrest Warrant and held in prison for a year before being acquitted in 2011.
