= John Horridge =

John Horridge (25 June 1893 – 27 December 1951) was a British Liberal Party politician and barrister.

== Background ==
He was the son of Thomas Mowbray Horridge. He married, in 1934, Brita Charlotta Persson, of Malung, Sweden. They had two sons.

== Diplomatic and legal career ==
He served during the European War in France from 1915 to 1916, and Mesopotamia from 1917 to 1918 reaching the rank of captain. In 1918 he was appointed to the Political Service, Persia, as Assistant Political Officer, at Kermanshah. From 1918 to 1919 he served as Assistant Political Officer and Acting Vice-Consul at Hamadan. From 1919 to 1920 he served the Civil Administration Mesopotamia, as Assistant Political Officer, at Khanaqin. In 1922 he was Called to the Bar at Lincoln's Inn. In 1937 he was appointed Barrister-at-Law and Master of the Supreme Court, King's Bench Division.

== Political career ==
He was Liberal candidate for the Sevenoaks Division of Kent at the 1935 general election. Sevenoaks was a safe Conservative seat that the Liberal Party had not won since 1923.

General election 1935: Sevenoaks. Electorate: 48,559.
Party	Candidate	Votes	%	±%
Conservative	Charles Ponsonby	21,405	67.5	
Liberal	John Horridge	10,297	32.5	
Majority		11,108	35.0	
Turnout			65.3	
Conservative hold		Swing		

He did not stand for parliament again.
