= Ashmole Academy =

Location
- Cecil Road; Southgate, London, England, N14 5RJ; United Kingdom; 51°37′58″N 0°08′10″W

Information
- Type: Academy; Comprehensive school
- Established: 1958
- Department for Education URN: 136308 Tables
- Ofsted: Reports
- Chair of Governors: Allison Walling
- Head Teacher: Balbinder Dhinsa
- Gender: Coeducational
- Age: 11 to 18
- Enrolment: 1,774
- Publication: @shmole Newsletter
- Website: http://www.ashmoleacademy.org/

Ashmole Academy (formerly Ashmole School) is a comprehensive secondary school with academy status in Southgate in the London Borough of Barnet. Under the direction of the headteacher Balbinder Dhinsa, around 1,800 pupils (550 in the sixth form) are educated in ages 11–18.

Pupils come from a wide range of minority ethnic heritages and a greater than usual number of pupils speak English as an additional language.

== History ==
The school, named after the 17th-century antiquary and politician Elias Ashmole, was founded in 1958 as the successor of Russell Lane Secondary Modern Boys' School which had changed its name to Ashmole School in about 1949, had Southaw School merged into it in 1971, and became a foundation school in 1999. It achieved specialist status in Science in 2002, and added a second specialism, Music, in 2006. The school moved into a new building on the same site in September 2004 costing £14m. The existing administration block was refurbished and opened as the performing arts centre in June 2005. This was funded by the sale of 38 acres (15 ha) of school grounds for redevelopment as housing.

On 1 October 2010, it became one of the first schools in north London (second in Barnet – after QE Boys) to convert to an academy after an invitation from the Coalition Government.

== Academic standards ==
Ofsted gave an overall rating of the school as Grade 1 Outstanding, the highest available assessment for a UK school, following their 2007 inspection. As of 2024, the school's most recent inspection was in 2021, with a judgement of Good.

== Notable former pupils ==
- Aden Durde, gridiron football player and coach
- Gilbert Gabriel, musician
- Julian Kelly, footballer
- Graham King, film producer
- Dee Murray, guitarist
- Daniel Peacock, actor and director
- Dan Gillespie Sells, musician
- Steve Sidwell, musician
- Rachel Stevens, singer, businesswoman, model and actress
- Andrew Symeou, author
- Phoebe Thomas, actress
- Amy Winehouse, singer
- Halimat Adio, England netball Player
