= Sir Piers Rodgers, 3rd Baronet =

Sir Andrew Piers Wingate Akin-Sneath Rodgers, 3rd Baronet (born 24 October 1944), was secretary of the Royal Academy of Arts from 1982 to 1996.

He was born on 24 October 1944 in Oxford, the son of the Conservative Party politician Sir John Rodgers, 1st Baronet (1906–1993), and his wife, Betsy Aikin-Sneath. He was educated at Eton and Merton College, Oxford.

In 1996, he was succeeded by David Gordon, the former chief executive of Independent Television News (ITN) and the Economist Group, as secretary of the Royal Academy. He is respected within the art world for his conservation work with UNESCO, and his positive influence during twelve years of employment at the Royal Academy.

He is currently married to Ilona, Lady Rodgers, and has four children: Thomas Rodgers (heir to the baronetcy) and Augustus Rodgers both with his former wife; and Hermione Rodgers and Anna-Laetitia Rodgers with Ilona.

== Arms ==
Coat of arms of Sir Piers Rodgers, 3rd Baronet

Crest
Two ravens' heads addorsed Sable and Gules both within a collar or pendant therefrom a rose Argent barbed and seeded.
Escutcheon
Azure two bars gemel dancetty Argent over all two palm branches in saltire enfiled through an ancient crown Or.
Motto
IIAOHMATA MAOHMATA (Experience Is Knowledge)

Baronetage of the United Kingdom
Preceded by Tobias Rodgers	Baronet (of Groombridge); 1997-present	Incumbent
