= Baron de Mauley =

Barony in the Peerage of the United Kingdom

Baron de Mauley, of Canford in the County of Dorset, is a title in the Peerage of the United Kingdom. It was created on 23 June 1838 for the Whig politician the Hon. William Ponsonby, who had earlier represented Poole, Knaresborough and Dorset in the House of Commons.

== History ==
The 1st Baron de Mauley was the third son of the 3rd Earl of Bessborough, an Anglo-Irish peer, and his wife Lady Henrietta Spencer, daughter of the 1st Earl Spencer. He married Lady Barbara Ashley-Cooper, the daughter of Anthony Ashley-Cooper, 5th Earl of Shaftesbury. She was one of the co-heirs to the ancient barony by writ of Mauley (or Maulay), which superseded the feudal barony the caput of which was at Mulgrave Castle, Yorkshire, which barony by writ had become extinct in 1415.

Their son, later the 2nd Baron, sat as Member of Parliament for Poole and Dungarvon. He married his first cousin Lady Maria Ponsonby, daughter of the 4th Earl of Bessborough.

Their eldest son, the 3rd Baron, never married, so the barony was inherited by his brother, who became the 4th Baron. He married the Hon. Madeline Hanbury-Tracy, daughter of the 2nd Baron Sudeley. They had two sons, Capt. Gerald Ponsonby, an officer in the Royal Inniskilling Fusiliers who was killed in the First World War, and Hubert, who became the 5th Baron.

The 5th Baron married Elgiva Margaret Dundas, a great-granddaughter of the 1st Earl of Zetland. They had two sons. The eldest, the 6th Baron, married Helen Alice Douglas, a granddaughter of the 19th Earl of Morton; the marriage was childless. Their second son, Col. Hon. Thomas Ponsonby, an officer of the Wessex Yeomanry who held the offices of Deputy Lieutenant of Gloucestershire and High Sheriff of Gloucestershire, married Maxine Henrietta Thellusson, whose great-great-great-grandfather Charles Thellusson, Member of Parliament for Evesham, was the younger brother of the 1st Baron Rendlesham.

As of 2024, the title is held by their eldest son, the 7th Baron, who succeeded his uncle in 2002. He is one of the ninety elected hereditary peers that remain in the House of Lords after the passing of the House of Lords Act 1999, and sits as a Conservative. He was elected in 2005 and thereby became the first hereditary peer having succeeded to his title after the House of Lords Act of 1999, to have obtained an elective hereditary peers seat in the House of Lords. In July 2018, the Queen appointed the 7th Baron to succeed the 3rd Baron Vestey as Master of the Horse. The appointment took effect on 1 January 2019.

The family seat was Langford House, Little Faringdon, West Oxfordshire from the 1850s until 2002.

== Baron de Mauley (1838) ==
- William Francis Spencer Ponsonby, 1st Baron de Mauley (1787–1855)
- Charles Frederick Ashley Cooper Ponsonby, 2nd Baron de Mauley (1815–1896)
- William Ashley Webb Ponsonby, 3rd Baron de Mauley (1843–1918)
- Maurice John George Ponsonby, 4th Baron de Mauley (1846–1945)
- Hubert William Ponsonby, 5th Baron de Mauley (1878–1962)
- Gerald John Ponsonby, 6th Baron de Mauley (1921–2002)
- Rupert Charles Ponsonby, 7th Baron de Mauley (born 1957)

The heir presumptive is the present holder's brother, the Hon. (Note: The present holder's brother was allowed by a warrant of precedence from Queen Elizabeth II to use the style of Honourable, because their father would have held the peerage but for his predeceasing the previous holder.) (Ashley) George Ponsonby (born 1959).
The title next falls to Sir Charles Ponsonby, 3rd Baronet (born 1951), a third cousin of the present holder and his brother. He is a great-grandson of the Hon. Edwin Ponsonby, fifth son of the 2nd Baron.

=== Title succession chart ===
Title succession chart, Barons de Mauley

William Ponsonby; 1st Baron de Mauley; 1787–1855
Charles Ponsonby; 2nd Baron de Mauley; 1815–1896
William Ponsonby; 3rd Baron de Mauley; 1843–1918	George Ponsonby; 1844–1845	Maurice Ponsonby; 4th Baron de Mauley; 1846–1945	Hon. Frederick Ponsonby; 1847–1933	Hon. Edwin Ponsonby; 1851–1939
Ponsonby baronetcy
Capt. Gerald Ponsonby; 1876–1914	Hubert Ponsonby; 5th Baron de Mauley; 1878–1962	Sir Charles Ponsonby; 1st Baronet; 1879–1976
Gerald Ponsonby; 6th Baron de Mauley; 1921–2002	Col. Hon. Thomas Ponsonby; 1930–2001	Sir Ashley Ponsonby; 2nd Baronet; 1921–2010
Rupert Ponsonby; 7th Baron de Mauley born 1957	Hon. George Ponsonby born 1959	Sir Charles Ponsonby; 3rd Baronet born 1951

== Other notable descendants ==
The Hon. Ashley Ponsonby (1831–1898), younger son of the 1st Baron, was a Liberal politician, Grenadier Guards officer and justice of the peace.

Another member of this branch of the Ponsonby family was the Conservative politician Charles Ponsonby (1879–1976), who was created a baronet in 1956. He was the eldest son of the Hon. Edwin Charles William Ponsonby (1851–1939), fifth son of the 2nd Baron.

Former Air Vice Marshal John Ponsonby (1955–2022) was the son of officer, diplomat and politician Myles Ponsonby (1924–1999), and a grandson of Victor Coope Ponsonby (1887–1966), fourth son of the Hon. Edwin Charles William Ponsonby.

== See also ==
- Earl of Bessborough
- Baron Ponsonby of Imokilly
- Baron Sysonby
- Baron Ponsonby of Shulbrede
- Ponsonby baronets of Wootton
- Lady Caroline Ponsonby

== Notes and references ==
=== References ===
- Hesilrige, Arthur G. M. (1921). Debrett's Peerage and Titles of courtesy. London: Dean & Son. p. 275.
- Kidd, Charles, ed. (1903). Debrett's peerage, baronetage, knightage, and companionage. London: Dean & Son. p. 294.
- Leigh Rayment's Peerage Pages
