= 1935 Sevenoaks by-election =

UK Parliamentary by-election

The 1935 Sevenoaks by-election was held on 20 July 1935 in the Sevenoaks parliamentary constituency. The by-election was necessary due to the retirement of the incumbent Conservative MP, Hilton Young, who received the newly created title Baron Kennet. It was won by the Conservative candidate Charles Ponsonby.
