= Rodgers baronets =

Baronetcy in the Baronetage of the United Kingdom

The Rodgers Baronetcy, of Groombridge in the County of Kent, is a title in the Baronetage of the United Kingdom. It was created on 29 June 1964 for the Conservative politician John Rodgers. As of 2010 the title is held by his second son, the third Baronet, who succeeded his elder brother in 1997.

== Rodgers baronets, of Groombridge (1964) ==
- Sir John Charles Rodgers, 1st Baronet (1906–1993)
- Sir (John Fairlie) Tobias Rodgers, 2nd Baronet (1940–1997)
- Sir (Andrew) Piers Wingate Akin-Sneath Rodgers, 3rd Baronet (born 1944).

The heir apparent is the present holder's eldest son Thomas Rodgers (born 1979).

== Arms ==
Coat of arms of Rodgers baronets

Crest
Two ravens' heads addorsed Sable and Gules both within a collar or pendant therefrom a rose Argent barbed and seeded.
Escutcheon
Azure two bars gemel dancetty Argent over all two palm branches in saltire enfiled through an ancient crown Or.
Motto
IIAOHMATA MAOHMATA (Experience Is Knowledge)
