= Stephanie Fraser, Baroness Fraser of Craigmaddie =

British charity executive and life peer

The Right Honourable The Baroness Fraser of Craigmaddie
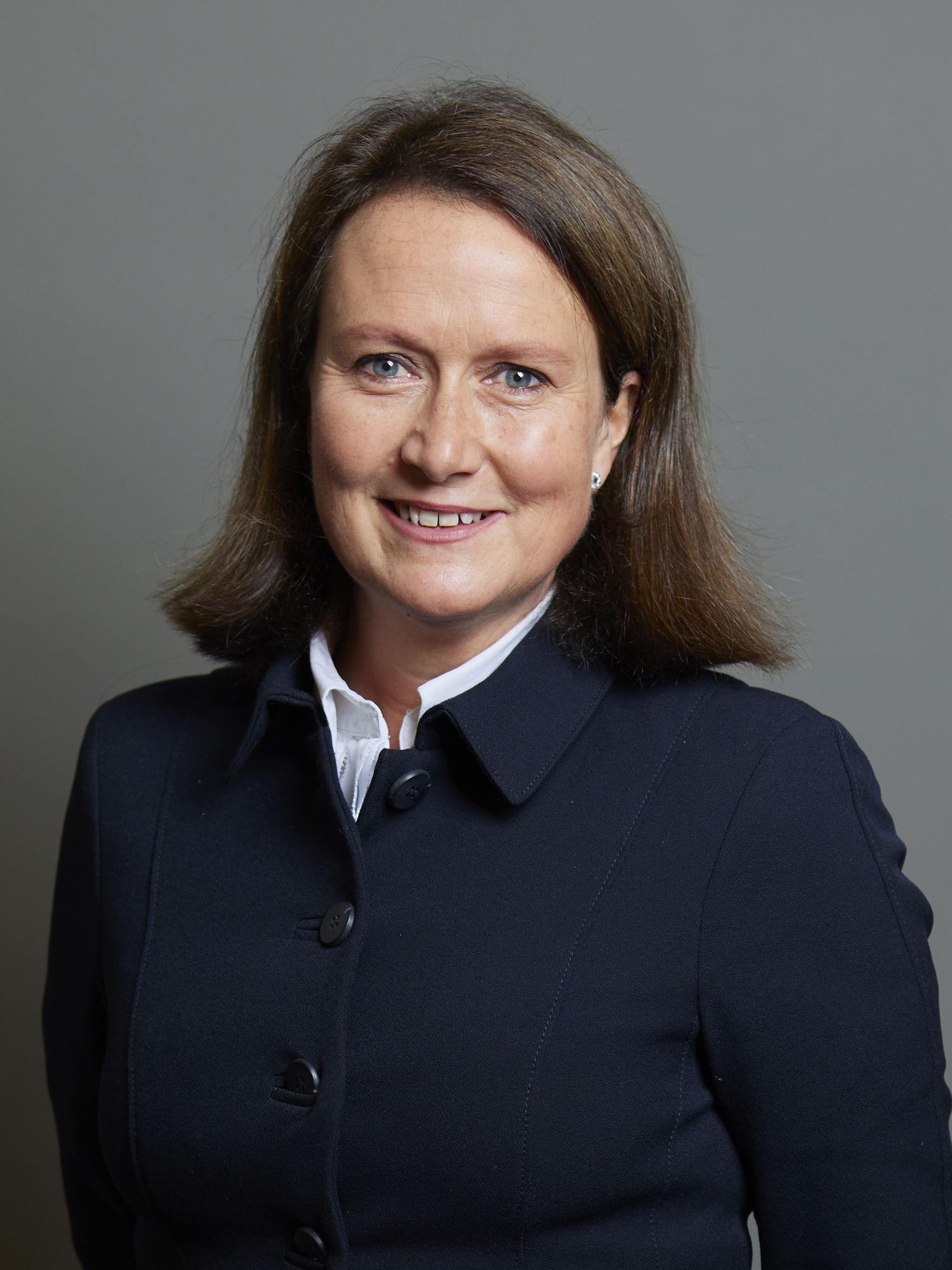
- Official portrait, 2021

Member of the House of Lords
- Lord Temporal
- Life peerage 26 January 2021

Personal details
- Born: 4 September 1968 (age 58)
- Party: Conservative

Stephanie Mary Fraser, Baroness Fraser of Craigmaddie (born 4 September 1968), is a British charity executive and life peer. She is the chief executive of Cerebral Palsy Scotland.

== Early life and education ==
Fraser was born on 4 September 1968 in Glasgow, Scotland. She was educated at Arts Educational School, Tring Park (now Tring Park School), a private school in Tring, Hertfordshire, England, and at Stowe School, a public school in Stowe, Buckinghamshire. She studied history at Trinity College, Cambridge, graduating with a Bachelor of Arts (BA) degree in 1990.

== Political career ==
Fraser was the Conservative candidate in Strathkelvin and Bearsden in the 2011 Scottish Parliament election.

In December 2020, it was announced that she would be receiving a life peerage. She entered the House of Lords as a Conservative peer on 26 January 2021. On 13 May 2021, she made her maiden speech during the Queen's Speech debate.

== Committee membership ==
- International Relations and Defence Committee
