= International Relations and Defence Committee =

Select committee of the UK House of Lords

The House of Lords International Relations and Defence Committee, previously just the International Relations Committee, is a select committee of the House of Lords in the Parliament of the United Kingdom. The remit of the Committee is to "consider the United Kingdom's international relations". The committee was recommended by the House of Lords Liaison Committee in its report on 29 October 2015 and agreed by the House on 10 November 2015.

== Chairs ==
Committee chairs include those listed below.

Name	Start	End	Party
The Lord Howell of Guildford	25 May 2016	1 July 2019	Conservative
The Baroness Anelay of St Johns	1 July 2019	31 January 2023	Conservative
The Lord Ashton of Hyde	31 January 2023	30 May 2024	Conservative
The Lord de Mauley	29 July 2024	27 January 2026	Conservative
The Lord Robertson of Port Ellen	27 January 2026	present	Labour

== Membership ==
As of May 2026, the membership of the committee is as follows:

Member	Party
Lord Robertson of Port Ellen(Chair)	Labour
Lord Ahmad of Wimbledon	Conservative
Lord Alderdice	Liberal Democrat
Baroness Blackstone	Labour
Lord Bruce of Bennachie	Liberal Democrat
Baroness Crawley	Labour
Lord Darroch of Kew	Crossbench
Baroness Fraser of Craigmaddie	Conservative
Lord Grocott	Labour
Lord Houghton of Richmond	Crossbench
Lord Lamont of Lerwick	Conservative
Baroness Prashar	Crossbench

== See also ==
- Parliamentary committees of the United Kingdom
