= Walter Styles =

Lieutenant Colonel Herbert Walter Styles (4 April 1889 – 5 October 1965), known as Walter Styles, was a British soldier and Member of Parliament.

== Early life ==
The son of Frederick Styles, he was educated at Eton and Exeter College, Oxford. At Oxford he rowed for Exeter with Geoffrey Fisher, who later became Archbishop of Canterbury.

== Career ==
Styles was commissioned into the Royal West Kent Regiment before the First World War, during which he was promoted Captain and severely injured, to be invalided out of the service in 1918.

In 1922, he married Violet, the only daughter of Major H. Hawkins, of Everdon, Northamptonshire, and they had one daughter.

Styles was elected as Member of Parliament for Sevenoaks at the 1924 general election, standing as a Conservative and defeating the sitting Member, Ronald Williams, a Liberal. He did not contest the election of 1929 and returned to private life.

In 1934, Styles settled in Sussex. During the Second World War of 1939 to 1945 he commanded the local Battalion of the Home Guard, when he was given the rank of Lieutenant-Colonel of the Royal Sussex Regiment. At the time of his death he was Chairman of the Governing Body of the Lewes Grammar School for Boys. His address in 1965 was Old Farmhouse, Rodmell, Lewes, Sussex.

== Notes ==
Parliament of the United Kingdom
Preceded by Ronald Williams	Member of Parliament for Sevenoaks; 1924–1929	Succeeded by Sir Hilton Young
