= Rupert Ponsonby, 7th Baron de Mauley =

British hereditary peer (born 1957)

Lieutenant Colonel The Right Honourable The Lord de Mauley KCVO TD FCA
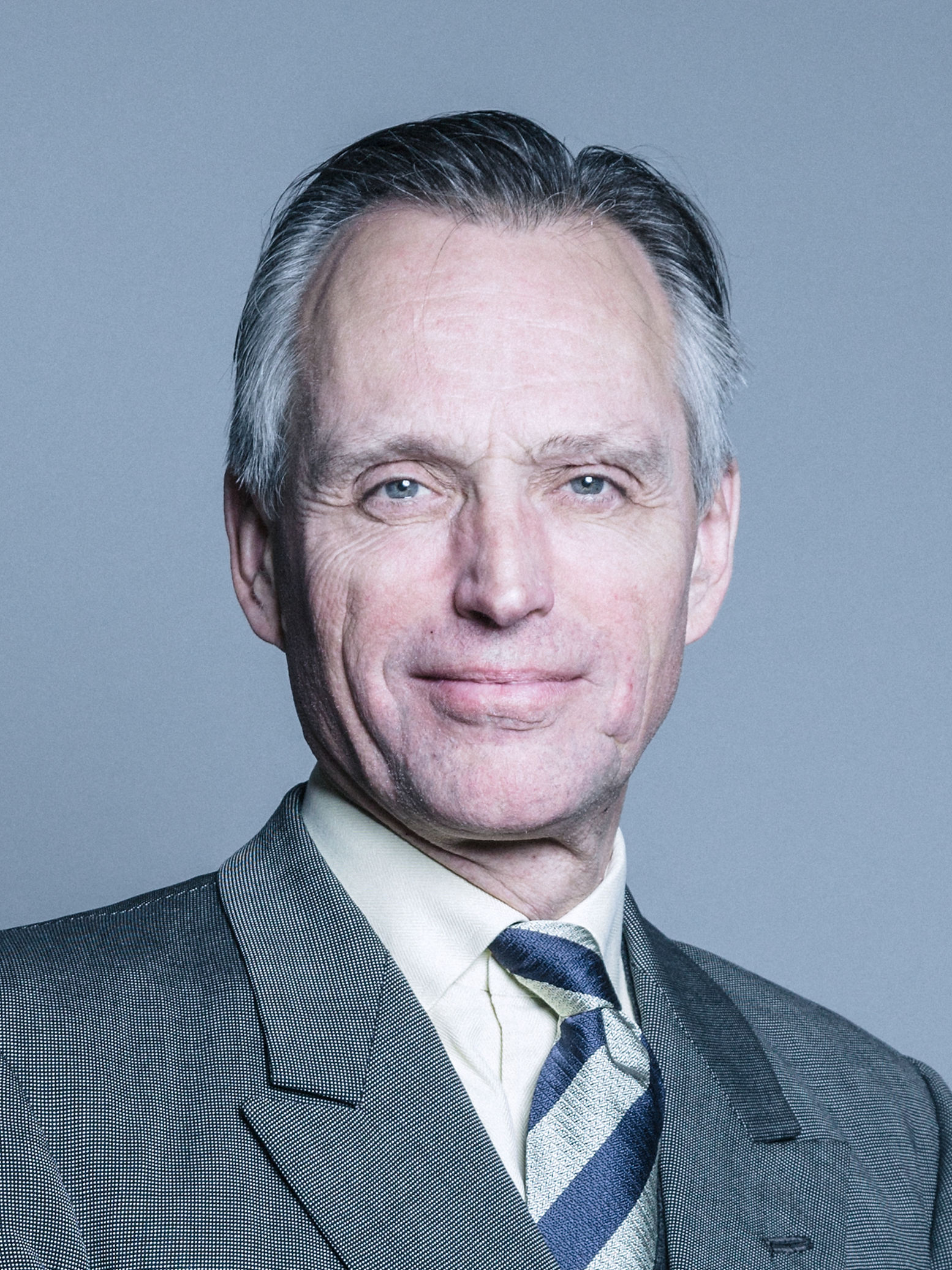
- Official portrait, 2018

Chair of the International Relations and Defence Committee
- In office 29 July 2024 – 27 January 2026
- Preceded by: The Lord Ashton of Hyde
- Succeeded by: George Robertson, Baron Robertson of Port Ellen

Master of the Horse
- In office 1 January 2019 – 18 June 2024
- Monarchs: Elizabeth II; Charles III
- Preceded by: The Lord Vestey
- Succeeded by: The Lord Ashton of Hyde

Parliamentary Under-Secretary of State for Natural Environment and Science
- In office 6 September 2012 – September 2015
- Prime Minister: David Cameron
- Preceded by: The Lord Taylor of Holbeach
- Succeeded by: The Lord Gardiner of Kimble

Lord-in-waiting Government Whip
- In office 11 May 2010 – 6 September 2012
- Prime Minister: David Cameron
- Preceded by: The Lord Young of Norwood Green
- Succeeded by: The Viscount Younger of Leckie

Member of the House of Lords Lord Temporal
- Incumbent
- Life peerage 5 June 2026
- Elected Hereditary Peer; 15 March 2005 – 29 April 2026
- By-election: 2005
- Preceded by: The 6th Baron Burnham
- Succeeded by: Seat abolished

Personal details
- Born: Rupert Charles Ponsonby; 30 June 1957 (age 69)
- Party: Conservative
- Parents: Hon. Thomas Ponsonby; Maxine Thellusson
- Education: Eton College

Military service
- Allegiance: United Kingdom
- Branch: British Army Reserve
- Years: 1976–2005
- Rank: Lieutenant colonel
- Unit: Royal Wessex Yeomanry

Lieutenant Colonel Rupert Charles Ponsonby, 7th Baron de Mauley, Baron de Mauley of Canford (born 30 June 1957), is a British hereditary peer, former Parliamentary Under-Secretary at the Department for Environment, Food and Rural Affairs and retired Territorial Army officer.

In May 2026, it was announced that he was to be given one of 26 new life peerages, returning him to the House of Lords after the coming into force of the House of Lords (Hereditary Peers) Act 2026.

== Background and education ==
Ponsonby was born to Col. the Hon. Thomas Maurice Ponsonby (1930–2001) of The Common, Little Faringdon, Lechlade, late Royal Wessex Yeomanry, High Sheriff of Gloucestershire, and his wife Maxine Henrietta (née Thellusson, 1934–2020), daughter of William Dudley Keith Thellusson, of 39, Draycott Place, SW3, of the Brodsworth Hall branch of the family of the Barons Rendlesham. The 5th Baron de Mauley was his paternal grandfather.

He was educated at Eton College, an independent school for boys near Windsor, Berkshire.

=== Military service ===
Ponsonby first joined the Territorial Army in 1976, when he was commissioned into the Royal Wessex Yeomanry as a second lieutenant. He was promoted to lieutenant in 1978, major in 1988, and lieutenant-colonel in 2003. In 1988, he was awarded the Efficiency Decoration (Territorial) (TD). He retired in 2005. From 1 June 2011 to 1 January 2024 he was Colonel Commandant Yeomanry, attached to the Royal Armoured Corps, and from 1 July 2015 to 2022 he was Honorary Colonel of the Royal Wessex Yeomanry. On 1 April 2025 appointed Squadron Honorary Colonel C (Royal Gloucestershire Hussars) Squadron, the Royal Wessex Yeomanry Army Reserve.

=== Peerage ===
Lord de Mauley succeeded his uncle, the 6th Baron de Mauley, in October 2002. On 10 March 2005, he was declared the winner of a by-election for a Conservative hereditary peers' seat in the House of Lords after the death of Hugh Lawson, 6th Baron Burnham. He was the first peer to have acceded to a title after the House of Lords Act 1999 to have obtained an elective hereditaries' seat in the House. de Mauley chaired the International Relations and Defence Committee from 29 July 2024 until 27 January 2026.

== Political career ==
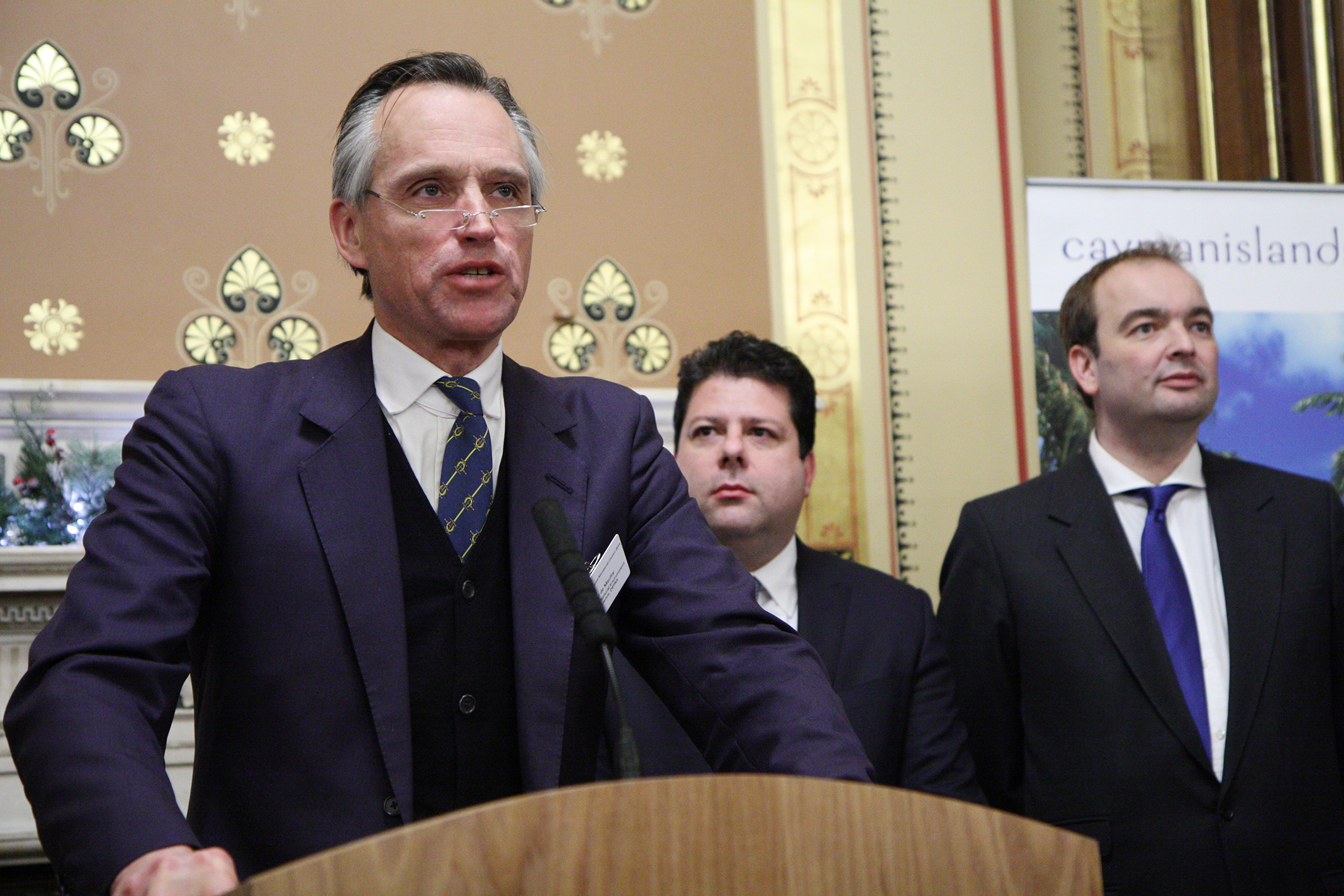
Lord de Mauley speaks at the Overseas Territories Joint Ministerial Council meeting in London on 3 December 2014.

He was Parliamentary Under-Secretary at the Department for Environment, Food and Rural Affairs between 2012 and 2015, after taking over from John Taylor, Baron Taylor of Holbeach, who went to the Home Office. His roles there included resource management, the local environment, environmental science and the department's work with small and medium-sized enterprises. He was previously a Government Lord-in-waiting (a position in the Royal Household given to Government Lords whips) and also served as a Shadow Minister for Children, Schools & Families and Energy & Climate Change from 2008 to 2009, and then an opposition whip from 2009 to 2010.

His selection in 2014 to lead UK fisheries talks in the European Union faced certain criticism, given his background as a hereditary peer with no prior experience in this field.

=== National Pollinator Strategy ===
In June 2013 de Mauley announced that his department would produce a National Pollinator Strategy. This followed the Bee Cause campaign led by Friends of the Earth and supported by well over 200 MPs for a bee action plan. Leading bee scientists set seven tests to help assess whether the plan is capable of helping pollinators.

== Master of the Horse ==
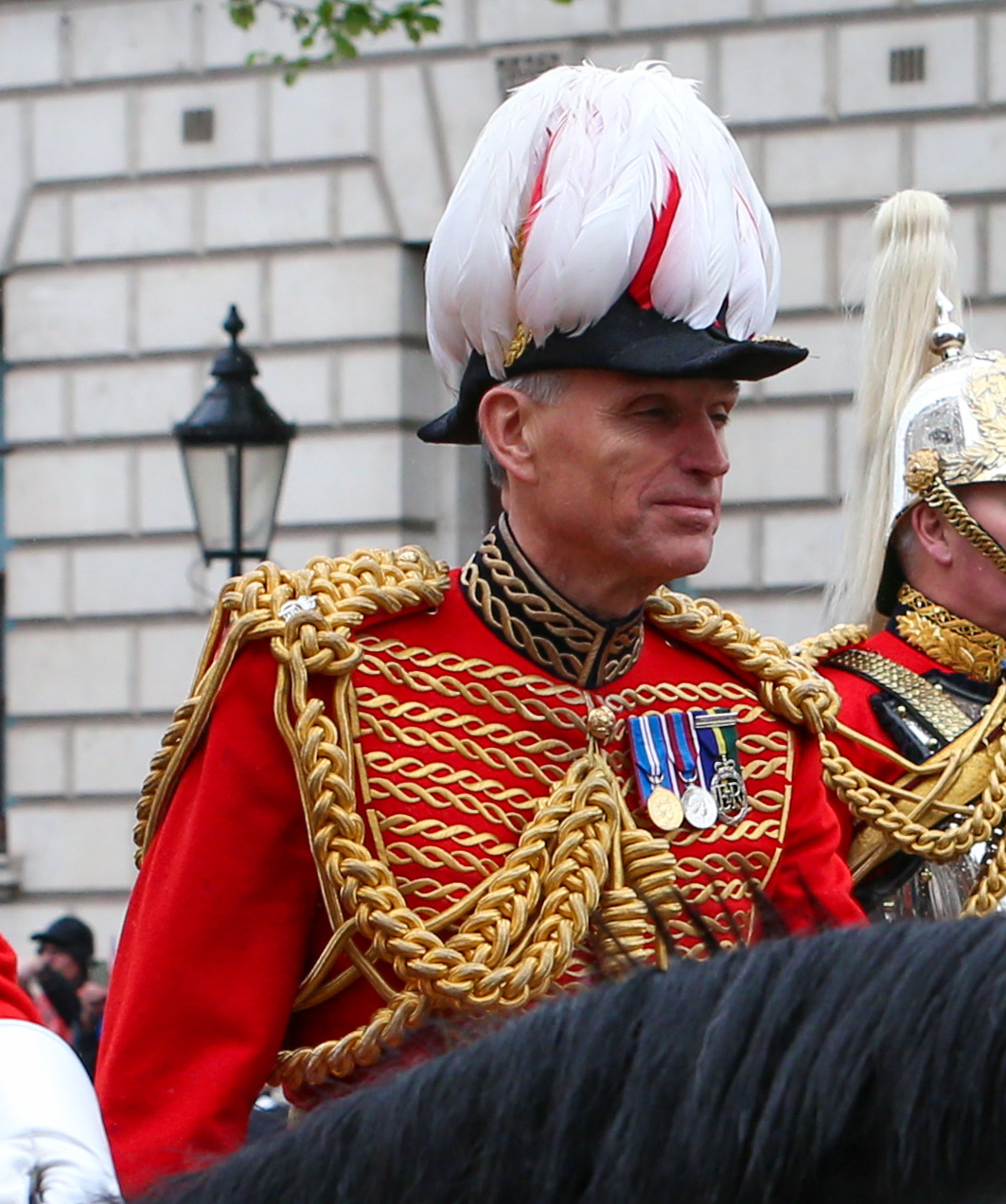
Lord de Mauley as Master of the Horse during the coronation of Charles III in 2023

In July 2018, Queen Elizabeth II appointed Lord de Mauley to succeed Lord Vestey as Master of the Horse. His appointment took effect on 1 January 2019. In this role, he took part in the 2023 coronation of Charles III.

In the 2024 King's Birthday Honours, he was appointed a Knight Commander of the Royal Victorian Order (KCVO).

On 18 June 2024, he stepped down from the role, and was succeeded by The Lord Ashton of Hyde.

== Family ==
Lord de Mauley is married to Lucinda (née Royle), younger daughter of Lord Fanshawe of Richmond.

The heir to his title Baron de Mauley is his younger brother, the Hon. (Ashley) George Ponsonby, (Note: Lord de Mauley's brother was allowed by a warrant of precedence from Elizabeth II to use the style of Honourable, because their father would have held the peerage but for his predeceasing the previous holder.) who is married to the former Camilla Gordon-Lennox (née Pilkington).

== Arms ==
Coat of arms of Rupert Ponsonby, 7th Baron de Mauley
Crest Out of a ducal coronet Or three arrows points downwards one in pale and two in saltire entwined at the intersection by a snake Proper. Escutcheon Gules a chevron between three combs Argent. Supporters Dexter a lion reguardant Proper sinister a bull Sable armed unguled tufted and ducally gorged Or. Motto Pro Rege Lege Grece (For The King The Law And The People)

== Notes and references ==
=== References ===
Peerage of the United Kingdom
Preceded by Gerald Ponsonby	Baron de Mauley; 2002–present	Incumbent; Heir presumptive: Hon. George Ponsonby
Parliament of the United Kingdom
Preceded by The Lord Burnham	Elected hereditary peer to the House of Lords under the House of Lords Act 1999; 2005–2026	Position abolished under the House of Lords (Hereditary Peers) Act 2026
Court offices
Preceded by The Lord Vestey	Master of the Horse; 2019–2024	Succeeded by The Lord Ashton of Hyde
