= Anthony Ashley Cooper, 4th Earl of Shaftesbury =

British peer and philanthropist (1711–1771)

Anthony Ashley Cooper, 4th Earl of Shaftesbury Bt PC FRS (9 February 1711 – 27 May 1771) was a British peer and philanthropist, who was one of the leading figures in the foundation of the colony of Georgia and served as Lord Lieutenant of Dorset from 1734 until his death.

== Family legacy ==
Shaftesbury was the only child of Anthony Ashley-Cooper, 3rd Earl of Shaftesbury, and his wife Jane Ewer (c.1689–1751), daughter of a gentleman in Hertfordshire. His father died in February 1713, leaving him fatherless in infancy, as well as heir to the family titles and estates. He grew up learning about the achievements of his father and great-grandfather and revering his family history. In 1732, he published a new edition of his father's influential work, Characteristicks of Men, Manners, Opinions, Times. The book was among the most influential of the British Enlightenment; historian Benjamin Rand described the 3rd Earl as the "greatest Stoic of modern times".

Shaftesbury also commissioned a biography of his great-grandfather and retained Benjamin Martyn for the project. He had become well acquainted with Martyn, Secretary to the Trustees for the Establishment of the Colony of Georgia in America, when he became a member of that organization at its first annual meeting in 1733. He supported his uncle Charles Ewer to be MP for Shaftesbury in 1741.

== The Georgia Trustees ==
Shaftesbury was elected to the Trustees for the Establishment of the Colony of Georgia in America in 1733, less than a year after the group was created by royal charter. In light of his family’s intellectual tradition, he may have been among those trustees who, following James Oglethorpe, saw the Georgia colony as a potential model society as well as one that addressed several more pragmatic purposes through the Oglethorpe Plan. By 1750, however, Shaftesbury replaced Oglethorpe as a guiding force among the Trustees, tilting the governance of the colony in a more conventional direction and preparing it to become a royal colony in 1752.

== Marriages and children ==
Shaftesbury married in 1724 his distant cousin Susan or Susanna Noel (1710–1758), daughter of Baptist Noel, 3rd Earl of Gainsborough. They had no children.

Secondly, in 1759 he married Mary Bouverie (1730–1804), daughter of Jacob Bouverie, later 1st Viscount Folkestone. Their children were:

- Anthony Ashley Cooper, later 5th Earl of Shaftesbury
- Cropley Ashley Cooper, later 6th Earl of Shaftesbury
- Lady Mary Anne Cooper (1766–1854), who married Charles Sturt, MP for Bridport

== Honours and positions ==
Shaftesbury was elected as a Fellow of the Royal Society in 1754, and was made a Privy Counsellor in 1761. He was Lord Lieutenant of Dorset, the monarch's representative in that county, from 1734 until his death.

Peerage of England
Preceded by Anthony Ashley Cooper	Earl of Shaftesbury; 1713–1771	Succeeded by Anthony Ashley Cooper
