= Thomas Jewell Bennett =

British journalist and politician

Sir Thomas Jewell Bennett CIE (16 May 1852 in Wisbech – 16 January 1925 in Hans Place, London) was a British journalist and Conservative Party politician. He is most notable as an editor of The Times of India, as well as its principal proprietor. He was also the member of parliament (MP) for the Sevenoaks constituency (in Kent, England) from 1918 to 1923.

Bennett was the son of John Thomas Jewell who was a first cousin of the English composer William Sterndale Bennett. He took up the career of journalism and became assistant editor of the Western Daily Press in Bristol, after which he was a leader writer at The Standard. In 1884, he went to Bombay in British India, where for eight years he was an associate editor of the Bombay Gazette. He was later both editor and principal proprietor of the Times of India which he modernised and expanded until it later came to be regarded as the leading English language newspaper in Asia.

When he left India in 1901, 3,000 Guzerat farmers presented him with an address thanking him for their support during the famines they suffered in the late 1890s. In 1902, he was awarded the silver medal of the Society of Arts for an article on the British in the Persian Gulf and became a fellow of the University of Bombay. He was created a Companion of the Order of the Indian Empire (CIE) in the 1903 Durbar Honours.

He contested the Brigg constituency unsuccessfully in 1910 before being elected for Sevenoaks in 1918 as a Unionist. He was an active member of the Joint Select Committee on India in 1919, which framed the Government of India Bill of that year to expand participation of Indians in the Indian government, and in a 1920 Commons speech on the 1919 unrest in India and the Amritsar massacre of unarmed civilians he strongly defended Indian rights. He also represented the Diocese of Rochester in the National Assembly of the Church of England.

Bennett was knighted in 1921 for public services. Elena Brooke-Jones, his second wife, whom he married in 1917, worked actively for local causes in Kent until her death in 1967. Bennett's obituary in The Times in 1925 noted his steadfast work for Indian advancement.

Parliament of the United Kingdom
Preceded by Henry Forster	Member of Parliament for Sevenoaks; 1918–1923	Succeeded by Ronald Williams
