= Mark Wolfson =

British politician (1934–2018)

Geoffrey Mark Wolfson OBE (7 April 1934 – 14 November 2018), known as Mark Wolfson, was Conservative MP for Sevenoaks from 1979 until he retired in 1997.

== Early life ==
Mark Wolfson was educated at Eton College and Pembroke College, Cambridge. He served in the Royal Navy from 1952 to 1954. After working as a teacher, he was Head of Youth Services at The Industrial Society from 1966 to 1969, leading the I'm Backing Britain campaign. He became a director of Hambros Bank in 1973.

== Political career ==
Wolfson contested Islington North in February 1974, and then Paddington in October 1974, each time being beaten by Labour incumbents.

He was elected for the safe Conservative seat of Sevenoaks in 1979, which he held until he stood down at the 1997 general election. His successor was fellow Conservative Michael Fallon.

He subsequently became director of Brathay Trust and was appointed OBE in the 2002 New Year Honours.

Parliament of the United Kingdom
Preceded by Sir John Rodgers	Member of Parliament for Sevenoaks; 1979–1997	Succeeded by Michael Fallon
