= Ronald Williams (Liberal politician) =

British politician (1890–1971)

Ronald Samuel Ainslie Williams (2 April 1890 – 10 December 1971) was an English Liberal Party politician.

== Family and education ==
Williams was the second son of Frank Williams of Brasted Hall in Kent. He was educated at Repton School and the Royal Military Academy, Woolwich. In 1918 he married Cicely Monro. They had a son and two daughters.

== Career ==
Williams was a professional soldier and reached the rank of Major in the Royal Artillery. He also served as a justice of the peace in Wiltshire from 1936 until 1964.

== Politician ==
Williams first stood for Parliament at the 1923 general election, as Liberal candidate for Sevenoaks in Kent. He defeated the sitting Conservative Member, Sir Thomas Bennett, in a straight fight, by a majority of 669 votes. This was the first, and so far only time, that Sevenoaks has been represented by a non-Conservative.

Williams defended his seat unsuccessfully at the 1924 general election, when in another straight fight with new Tory candidate Captain H. W. Styles he lost his unexpected gain by 5,814 votes.

He did not stand for election to the House of Commons again. However, after the Second World War, Williams had a local government career in Wiltshire. He was a member of Wiltshire County Council from 1945 to 1952 and served as an Alderman.

== Death ==
Williams died on 10 December 1971 aged 81 years.

Parliament of the United Kingdom
Preceded by Thomas Jewell Bennett	Member of Parliament for Sevenoaks; 1923–1924	Succeeded by Walter Styles
