= Sevenoaks (constituency) =

Parliamentary constituency in the United Kingdom, 1885 onwards

Coordinates: 51.30°N 0.17°E

- County constituency for the House of Commons
- Boundaries since 2024
- Boundary of Sevenoaks in South East England
- County: Kent
- Electorate: 73,684 (2023)
- Major settlements: Sevenoaks, Swanley, Otford, Westerham

Current constituency
- Created: 1885
- Member of Parliament: Laura Trott (Conservative)
- Seats: One
- Created from: West Kent
- During its existence contributed to new seat(s) of: Tonbridge and Malling (1974)

Sevenoaks is a constituency in Kent represented in the House of Commons of the UK Parliament since 2019 by Laura Trott, a Conservative who currently serves as Shadow Secretary of State for Education. She was Chief Secretary to the Treasury from November 2023 to July 2024. The seat was previously held by Michael Fallon, who served as Secretary of State for Defence from 2014 to 2017.

== Constituency profile ==
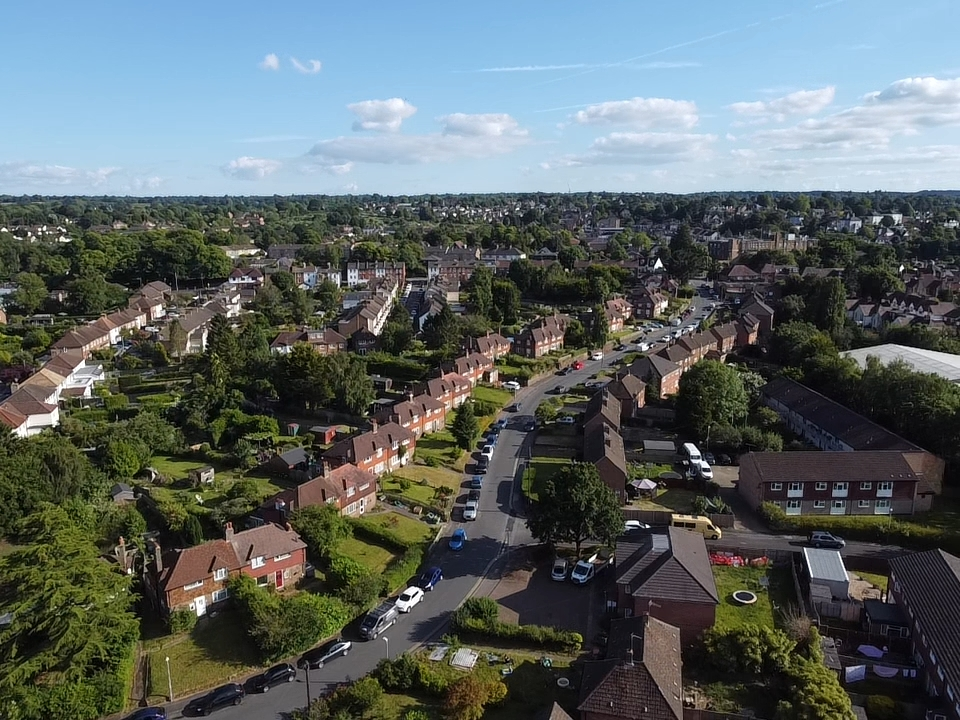
Sevenoaks

Sevenoaks is a constituency in Kent in South East England, taking up most of the Sevenoaks District and part of the neighbouring Borough of Dartford. Its largest settlement is the town of Sevenoaks, which has a population of around 27,000. Other settlements include the towns of Swanley and Westerham and the villages of Wilmington, Hextable, South Darenth, West Kingsdown, Otford, Kemsing and Dunton Green.

This is a mostly rural constituency covering small towns and villages on the outskirts of London's commuter belt, located around 20 miles (32 km) south-east of the centre of the capital. Sevenoaks is a historic market town lying within the Kent Downs, a National Landscape of rolling chalk hills. Close to Sevenoaks are two historic country houses: Knole and Chevening. Swanley was largely developed during the Victorian era around a railway junction. There is some deprivation in Swanley, where most residents live in semi-detached or terraced housing. The rest of the constituency is generally wealthy, especially in Sevenoaks; the town falls within the top 10% least-deprived areas in England and many residents live in large, detached houses. The constituency's average house price is nearly double the UK average.

This constituency has a low proportion of young adults and an above-average retired population. Residents have high rates of income and homeownership and the child poverty rate is around half the overall UK rate. They have average levels of education and a high proportion work in the construction and education sectors. The percentage of residents claiming unemployment benefits is low. White people made up 91% of the population at the 2021 census.

At the local district council, Sevenoaks town is represented by Liberal Democrats whilst Swanley and the rural villages elected Conservatives. At the county council, which held elections in 2025, most of the seats outside Sevenoaks town were won by Reform UK. An estimated 55% of voters across the constituency supported leaving the European Union in the 2016 referendum, marginally higher than the UK-wide figure of 52%.

== History ==
This constituency has existed since the Redistribution of Seats Act 1885.

With the exception of the one-year Parliament in 1923, the constituency has to date been a Conservative stronghold.

1885–1950

Sir Thomas Jewell Bennett before entering Parliament was a leader writer at The Standard and lived in India for many years, working at the Bombay Gazette before becoming both editor and principal proprietor of the Times of India. Bennett returned to England in 1901 and in 1910 unsuccessfully contested his first Parliamentary election, losing to Alfred Gelder at the time of David Lloyd George and H. H. Asquith's celebrated "People's Budget". He represented the seat for five years from 1918.

Higher in government in this period was Hilton Young, the Health Secretary between 1931 and 1935. The health portfolio at the time included responsibility for housing, including slum clearance and rehousing. Key items of legislation to which he contributed in this period were: the Town and Country Planning Act (1932) (which applied to all 'developable' land), the Housing Act (1935) (which laid down standards of accommodation) and the Restriction of Ribbon Development Act (1935) (which sought to consolidate urban development and restrict ribbon sprawl along major highways).

1950–date

Since 1950 the highest government position has been that of Michael Fallon, who was appointed Secretary of State for Defence in 2014 under Prime Minister David Cameron. Fallon held the office until he resigned on 1 November 2017 in the light of allegations of inappropriate behaviour of a sexual nature, before retiring prior to the 2019 general election.

== Boundaries ==
Map of 2010–2024 boundaries

1918–1950: The Urban Districts of Sevenoaks and Wrotham, and the Rural Districts of Malling and Sevenoaks.

1950–1974: The Urban District of Sevenoaks, and the Rural Districts of Malling and Sevenoaks.

1974–1983: The Urban District of Sevenoaks, the Rural District of Sevenoaks as altered by the Greater London Kent and Surrey Order 1968, and in the Rural District of Dartford the civil parishes of Ash-cum-Ridley, Eynsford, Farningham, Fawkham, Hartley, Horton Kirby, Longfield, Swanley, and West Kingsdown.

1983–1997: The District of Sevenoaks wards of Brasted, Chevening, Crockenhill and Lullingstone, Dunton Green, Eynsford, Farningham, Halstead Knockholt and Badgers Mount, Hextable and Swanley Village, Kemsing, Leigh, Otford, Penshurst and Fordcombe, Riverhead, Seal, Sevenoaks Kippington, Sevenoaks Northern, Sevenoaks Town and St John's, Sevenoaks Weald and Underriver, Sevenoaks Wildernesse, Shoreham, Somerdon, Sundridge and Ide Hill, Swanley Christchurch, Swanley St Mary's, Swanley White Oak, Westerham and Crockham, and West Kingsdown.

1997–2010: The District of Sevenoaks wards of Ash-cum-Ridley, Brasted, Chevening, Crockenhill and Lullingstone, Dunton Green, Eynsford, Farningham, Halstead Knockholt and Badgers Mount, Hextable and Swanley Village, Kemsing, Otford, Riverhead, Seal, Sevenoaks Kippington, Sevenoaks Northern, Sevenoaks Town and St John's, Sevenoaks Weald and Underriver, Sevenoaks Wildernesse, Shoreham, Sundridge and Ide Hill, Swanley Christchurch, Swanley St Mary's, Swanley White Oak, Westerham and Crockham, and West Kingsdown.

2010–2024: The District of Sevenoaks wards of Ash, Brasted, Chevening and Sundridge, Crockenhill and Well Hill, Dunton Green and Riverhead, Eynsford, Farningham, Horton Kirby and South Darenth, Fawkham and West Kingsdown, Halstead, Knockholt and Badgers Mount, Hextable, Kemsing, Otford and Shoreham, Seal and Weald, Sevenoaks Eastern, Sevenoaks Kippington, Sevenoaks Northern, Sevenoaks Town and St John's, Swanley Christchurch and Swanley Village, Swanley St Mary's, Swanley White Oak, and Westerham and Crockham Hill.

2024–present: Further to the 2023 periodic review of Westminster constituencies which came into effect for the 2024 general election, the constituency is composed of the following (as they existed on 1 December 2020):

- The Borough of Dartford ward of Wilmington, Sutton-at-Hone & Hawley.
- The District of Sevenoaks wards of: Brasted, Chevening & Sundridge; Crockenhill and Well Hill; Dunton Green and Riverhead; Eynsford; Farningham, Horton Kirby and South Darenth; Fawkham and West Kingsdown; Halstead, Knockholt and Badgers Mount; Hextable; Kemsing; Otford and Shoreham; Seal & Weald; Sevenoaks Eastern; Sevenoaks Kippington; Sevenoaks Northern; Sevenoaks Town and St. John’s; Swanley Christchurch and Swanley Village; Swanley St. Mary’s; Swanley White Oak; Westerham and Crockham Hill.

Minor changes, with the addition of the Wilmington, Sutton-at-Hone & Hawley ward from Dartford being offset by the transfer of the Ash & New Ash Green ward to the re-established constituency of Tonbridge.

== Members of Parliament ==
West Kent prior to 1885

Election	Member	Party	Notes
1885	Charles Mills	Conservative	
1892	Henry Forster	Conservative	Contested Bromley following redistribution
Constituency split, majority renamed Bromley, minority formed Chislehurst, remainder merged with part of the abolished Medway
1918	Thomas Jewell Bennett	Conservative	
1923	Ronald Williams	Liberal	
1924	Walter Styles	Conservative	
1929	Hilton Young	Conservative	Member for Norwich (1915–1923, 1924–1929)
1935	Charles Ponsonby	Conservative	
1950	John Rodgers	Conservative	
1979	Mark Wolfson	Conservative	
1997	Michael Fallon	Conservative	Secretary of State for Defence (2014–2017)
2019	Laura Trott	Conservative	Chief Secretary to the Treasury (2023–2024)

== Elections ==
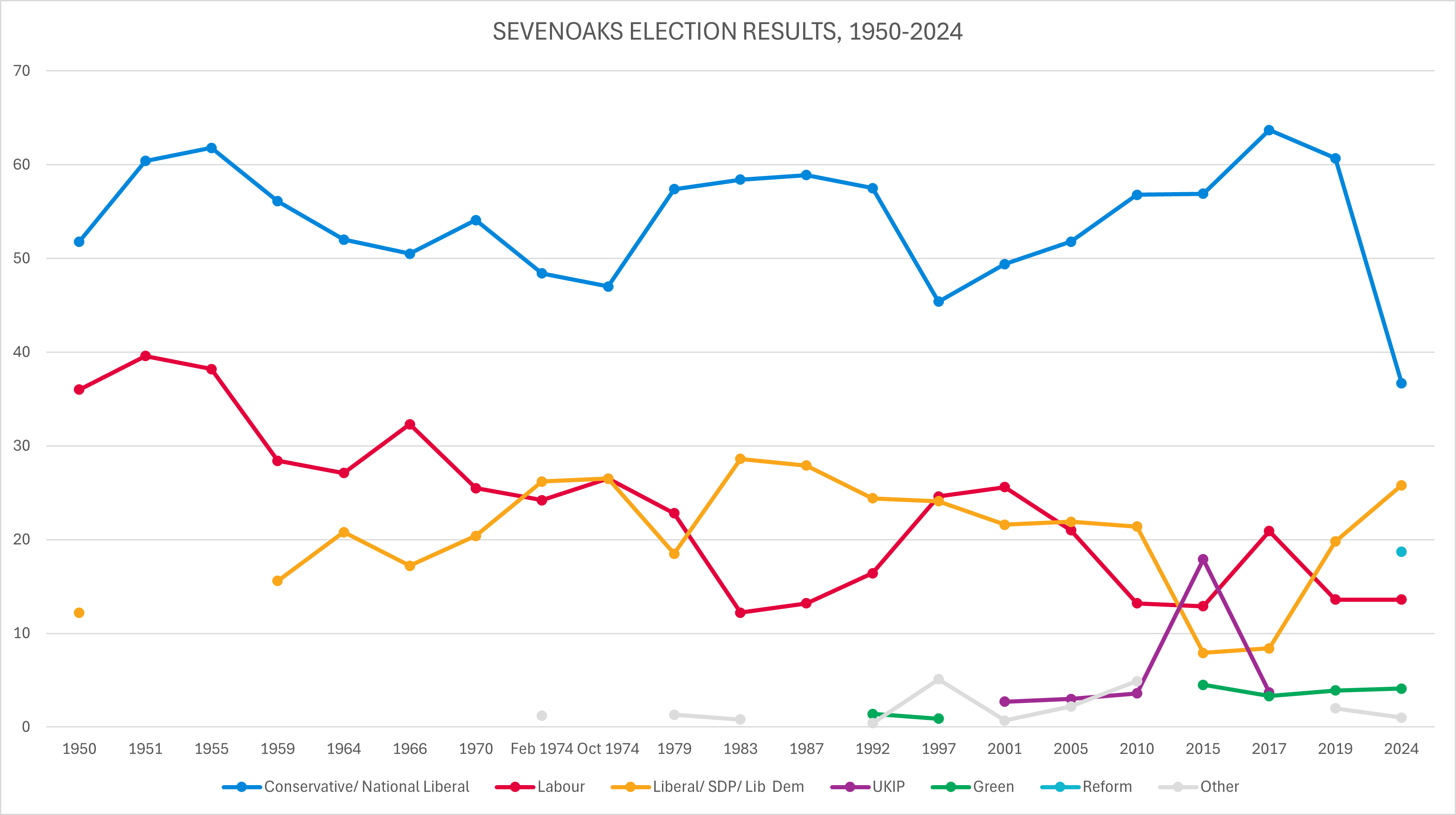
Election results 1950–2024

=== Elections in the 2020s ===
General election 2024: Sevenoaks
Party	Candidate	Votes	%	±%
Conservative	Laura Trott	18,328	36.7	−25.0
Liberal Democrats	Richard Streatfeild	12,888	25.8	+6.4
Reform	James Milmine	9,341	18.7	New
Labour	Denise Scott-McDonald	6,802	13.6	+0.1
Green	Laura Manston	2,033	4.1	+0.7
Rejoin EU	Elwyn Jones	298	0.6	New
SDP	Adam Hibbert	209	0.4	New
Majority		5,440	10.9	−31.4
Turnout		49,899	67.9	−2.0
Registered electors		73,708		
Conservative hold		Swing	−15.7	

=== Elections in the 2010s ===
2019 notional result
Party	Vote	%
Conservative	31,780	61.7
Liberal Democrats	9,987	19.4
Labour	6,958	13.5
Green	1,773	3.4
Others	990	1.9
Turnout	51,488	69.9
Electorate	73,684	

General election 2019: Sevenoaks
Party	Candidate	Votes	%	±%
Conservative	Laura Trott	30,932	60.7	−3.0
Liberal Democrats	Gareth Willis	10,114	19.8	+11.4
Labour	Seamus McCauley	6,946	13.6	−7.3
Green	Paul Wharton	1,974	3.9	+0.6
Independent	Paulette Furse	695	1.4	New
Libertarian	Sean Finch	295	0.6	New
Majority		20,818	40.9	−1.9
Turnout		50,956	71.0	−1.1
Conservative hold		Swing		

General election 2017: Sevenoaks
Party	Candidate	Votes	%	±%
Conservative	Michael Fallon	32,644	63.7	+6.8
Labour	Chris Clark	10,727	20.9	+8.0
Liberal Democrats	Alan Bullion	4,280	8.4	+0.5
UKIP	Graham Cushway	1,894	3.7	−14.2
Green	Philip Dodd	1,673	3.3	−1.2
Majority		21,917	42.8	+3.8
Turnout		51,218	72.1	+1.2
Conservative hold		Swing		

General election 2015: Sevenoaks
Party	Candidate	Votes	%	±%
Conservative	Michael Fallon	28,531	56.9	+0.1
UKIP	Steve Lindsay	8,970	17.9	+14.3
Labour	Chris Clark	6,448	12.9	−0.3
Liberal Democrats	Alan Bullion	3,937	7.9	−13.5
Green	Amelie Boleyn	2,238	4.5	New
Majority		19,561	39.0	+3.6
Turnout		50,124	70.9	−0.2
Conservative hold		Swing	−7.1	

General election 2010: Sevenoaks
Party	Candidate	Votes	%	±%
Conservative	Michael Fallon	28,076	56.8	+5.0
Liberal Democrats	Alan Bullion	10,561	21.4	−0.5
Labour	Gareth Siddorn	6,541	13.2	−7.8
UKIP	Christopher Heath	1,782	3.6	+0.6
BNP	Paul Golding	1,384	2.8	New
English Democrat	Louise Uncles	806	1.6	−0.1
Independent	Mark Ellis	258	0.5	New
Majority		17,515	35.4	+5.5
Turnout		49,408	71.1	+12.4
Conservative hold		Swing	+2.8	

=== Elections in the 2000s ===
General election 2005: Sevenoaks
Party	Candidate	Votes	%	±%
Conservative	Michael Fallon	22,437	51.8	+2.4
Liberal Democrats	Ben Abbotts	9,467	21.9	+0.3
Labour	Tim Stanley	9,101	21.0	−4.6
UKIP	Robert Dobson	1,309	3.0	+0.3
English Democrat	John Marshall	751	1.7	New
United Kingdom Pathfinders	Mark Ellis	233	0.5	−0.2
Majority		12,970	29.9	+6.1
Turnout		43,298	58.7	−5.2
Conservative hold		Swing		

General election 2001: Sevenoaks
Party	Candidate	Votes	%	±%
Conservative	Michael Fallon	21,052	49.4	+4.0
Labour	Caroline Humphreys	10,898	25.6	+1.0
Liberal Democrats	Clive Gray	9,214	21.6	−2.5
UKIP	Lisa Hawkins	1,155	2.7	New
United Kingdom Pathfinders	Mark Ellis	295	0.7	New
Majority		10,154	23.8	+3.0
Turnout		42,614	63.9	−11.5
Conservative hold		Swing	+1.5	

=== Elections in the 1990s ===
General election 1997: Sevenoaks
Party	Candidate	Votes	%	±%
Conservative	Michael Fallon	22,776	45.4	−12.1
Labour	John Hayes	12,315	24.6	+8.2
Liberal Democrats	Roger Walshe	12,086	24.1	−0.3
Referendum	Nigel Large	2,138	4.3	New
Green	Margot Lawrence	443	0.9	−0.5
Pathfinders	Mark Ellis	244	0.5	New
Natural Law	Alex Hankey	147	0.3	−0.1
Majority		10,461	20.8	−12.7
Turnout		50,149	75.4	−5.9
Conservative hold		Swing		

General election 1992: Sevenoaks
Party	Candidate	Votes	%	±%
Conservative	Mark Wolfson	33,245	57.5	−1.4
Liberal Democrats	Roger Walshe	14,091	24.4	−3.5
Labour	J. Evans	9,470	16.4	+3.2
Green	Margot Lawrence	786	1.4	New
Natural Law	P. Wakeling	210	0.4	New
Majority		19,154	33.1	+2.1
Turnout		57,802	81.3	+4.9
Conservative hold		Swing	+1.1	

=== Elections in the 1980s ===
General election 1987: Sevenoaks
Party	Candidate	Votes	%	±%
Conservative	Mark Wolfson	32,945	58.9	+0.5
Liberal	Stephen Jakobi	15,600	27.9	−0.7
Labour	Graham Green	7,379	13.2	+1.0
Majority		17,345	31.0	+1.2
Turnout		55,923	76.4	−2.7
Conservative hold		Swing	+0.6	

General election 1983: Sevenoaks
Party	Candidate	Votes	%	±%
Conservative	Mark Wolfson	30,722	58.4	+1.0
Liberal	Stephen Jakobi	15,061	28.6	+10.1
Labour	Roland Gooding	6,439	12.2	−12.6
National Front	G. L. Burnett	416	0.8	−0.5
Majority		15,706	29.8	−4.8
Turnout		52,596	73.7	−5.3
Conservative hold		Swing		

=== Elections in the 1970s ===
General election 1979: Sevenoaks
Party	Candidate	Votes	%	±%
Conservative	Mark Wolfson	36,697	57.39	+10.4
Labour	R. H. Redden	14,583	22.81	−3.73
Liberal	G. Phillips	11,839	18.52	−7.95
National Front	Michael Easter	821	1.28	New
Majority		22,114	34.58	+14.13
Turnout		63,942	78.98	+3.27
Conservative hold		Swing	+7.07	

General election October 1974: Sevenoaks
Party	Candidate	Votes	%	±%
Conservative	John Rodgers	26,670	46.99	−1.37
Labour	James Scanlan	15,065	26.54	+2.33
Liberal	Robert Webster	15,024	26.47	+0.26
Majority		11,605	20.45	−1.70
Turnout		56,759	75.71	−7.69
Conservative hold		Swing		

General election February 1974: Sevenoaks
Party	Candidate	Votes	%	±%
Conservative	John Rodgers	29,963	48.36	−5.77
Liberal	Ian Bradley	16,223	26.21	+5.85
Labour	J. Scanlan	14,987	24.21	−1.28
Independent	D. J. Woolard	754	1.22	New
Majority		13,713	22.15	−6.49
Turnout		61,898	83.4	+10.4
Conservative hold		Swing		

General election 1970: Sevenoaks:
Party	Candidate	Votes	%	±%
Conservative	John Rodgers	32,654	54.13	+3.63
Labour	John Ovenden	15,376	25.49	−6.83
Liberal	Robert Webster	12,290	20.37	+3.19
Majority		17,278	28.64	+8.46
Turnout		60,320	73.00	−6.19
Conservative hold		Swing	+5.2	

=== Elections in the 1960s ===
General election 1966: Sevenoaks
Party	Candidate	Votes	%	±%
Conservative	John Rodgers	28,651	50.50	−1.53
Labour	Peter Pearce	18,338	32.32	+5.18
Liberal	Noel Blackburn	9,746	17.18	−3.65
Majority		10,313	18.18	−6.71
Turnout		56,735	79.19	−0.89
Conservative hold		Swing	+3.3	

General election 1964: Sevenoaks
Party	Candidate	Votes	%	±%
Conservative	John Rodgers	28,678	52.03	−4.04
Labour	Peter Pearce	14,958	27.14	−1.24
Liberal	Nelia Penman	11,480	20.83	+5.28
Majority		13,720	24.89	−2.80
Turnout		55,116	80.09	−0.08
Conservative hold		Swing	−1.4	

=== Elections in the 1950s ===
General election 1959: Sevenoaks
Party	Candidate	Votes	%	±%
Conservative	John Rodgers	28,186	56.07	−5.77
Labour	Roderick Ogley	14,265	28.38	−9.78
Liberal	Nelia Penman	7,819	15.55	New
Majority		13,921	27.69	+4.01
Turnout		50,270	80.17	+2.10
Conservative hold		Swing	+2.0	

General election 1955: Sevenoaks
Party	Candidate	Votes	%	±%
Conservative	John Rodgers	28,936	61.84	+1.47
Labour	John N. Powrie	17,858	38.16	−1.47
Majority		11,078	23.68	+2.94
Turnout		46,794	78.07	−3.39
Conservative hold		Swing	+1.47	

General election 1951: Sevenoaks
Party	Candidate	Votes	%	±%
Conservative	John Rodgers	28,668	60.37	+8.62
Labour	John N. Powrie	18,823	39.63	+3.60
Majority		9,845	20.74	+5.02
Turnout		47,491	81.46	−3.44
Conservative hold		Swing	+2.5	

General election 1950: Sevenoaks
Party	Candidate	Votes	%	±%
Conservative	John Rodgers	25,292	51.75	+6.14
Labour	J. Spencer	17,610	36.03	−0.05
Liberal	Edward Moulton-Barrett	5,969	12.21	−4.46
Majority		7,682	15.72	+6.19
Turnout		48,871	84.9	+10.6
Conservative hold		Swing	+3.1	

=== Elections in the 1940s ===
General election 1945: Sevenoaks
Party	Candidate	Votes	%	±%
Conservative	Charles Ponsonby	18,893	45.61	−21.89
Labour	John Pudney	14,947	36.08	New
Liberal	Nelia Muspratt	6,906	16.67	−15.83
Communist	K. Thompson	676	1.63	New
Majority		3,946	9.53	−25.5
Turnout		41,422	73.6	+8.3
Conservative hold		Swing		

=== Elections in the 1930s ===
General election 1935: Sevenoaks
Party	Candidate	Votes	%	±%
Conservative	Charles Ponsonby	21,405	67.5	N/A
Liberal	John Horridge	10,297	32.5	New
Majority		11,108	35.0	N/A
Turnout		31,702	65.3	N/A
Conservative hold		Swing	N/A	

1935 Sevenoaks by-election
Party	Candidate	Votes	%	±%
Conservative	Charles Ponsonby	Unopposed		
Conservative hold				

General election 1931: Sevenoaks
Party	Candidate	Votes	%	±%
Conservative	Hilton Young	Unopposed		
Conservative hold				

=== Elections in the 1920s ===
General election 1929: Sevenoaks
Party	Candidate	Votes	%	±%
Unionist	Hilton Young	16,767	53.7	−8.2
Liberal	Edgar Stratton Liddiard	7,844	25.1	−13.0
Labour	Hamilton Fyfe	6,634	21.2	New
Majority		8,923	28.6	+4.8
Turnout		31,245	71.6	−3.2
Registered electors		43,627		
Unionist hold		Swing	+2.4	

General election 1924: Sevenoaks
Party	Candidate	Votes	%	±%
Unionist	Walter Styles	15,125	61.9	+13.5
Liberal	Ronald Williams	9,311	38.1	−13.5
Majority		5,814	23.8	N/A
Turnout		24,436	74.8	+10.4
Registered electors		32,660		
Unionist gain from Liberal		Swing	+13.5	

General election 1923: Sevenoaks
Party	Candidate	Votes	%	±%
Liberal	Ronald Williams	10,656	51.6	New
Unionist	Thomas Jewell Bennett	9,987	48.4	−15.4
Majority		669	3.2	N/A
Turnout		20,643	64.4	+3.5
Registered electors		32,078		
Liberal gain from Unionist		Swing		

General election 1922: Sevenoaks
Party	Candidate	Votes	%	±%
Unionist	Thomas Jewell Bennett	12,045	63.8	−12.4
Labour	L. A. Goldie	6,849	36.2	New
Majority		5,196	27.6	−24.8
Turnout		18,894	60.9	+14.6
Registered electors		31,000		
Unionist hold		Swing		

=== Elections in the 1910s ===
General election 1918: Sevenoaks
Party		Candidate	Votes	%	±%
C	Unionist	Thomas Jewell Bennett	10,650	76.2	N/A
	Independent Labour	John Ephraim Skinner	3,323	23.8	New
Majority			7,327	52.4	N/A
Turnout			13,973	46.3	N/A
Registered electors			30,189		
	Unionist hold		Swing	N/A	
C indicates candidate endorsed by the coalition government.

== Election results 1885–1918 ==
=== Elections in the 1880s ===
General election 1885: Sevenoaks
Party	Candidate	Votes	%	±%
Conservative	Charles Mills	4,651	54.0	
Liberal	Patteson Nickalls	3,956	46.0	
Majority		695	8.0	
Turnout		8,607	77.6	
Registered electors		11,089		
Conservative win (new seat)				

General election 1886: Sevenoaks
Party	Candidate	Votes	%	±%
Conservative	Charles Mills	Unopposed		
Conservative hold				

=== Elections in the 1890s ===
General election 1892: Sevenoaks
Party	Candidate	Votes	%	±%
Conservative	Henry Forster	6,036	60.7	N/A
Liberal	Thomas Johnston	3,908	39.3	New
Majority		2,128	21.4	N/A
Turnout		9,944	71.5	N/A
Registered electors		13,916		
Conservative hold		Swing	N/A	

General election 1895: Sevenoaks
Party	Candidate	Votes	%	±%
Conservative	Henry Forster	Unopposed		
Conservative hold				

=== Elections in the 1900s ===
General election 1900: Sevenoaks
Party	Candidate	Votes	%	±%
Conservative	Henry Forster	6,604	78.7	N/A
Liberal	Murray Spencer Richardson	1,792	21.3	New
Majority		4,812	57.4	N/A
Turnout		8,396	56.5	N/A
Registered electors		14,861		
Conservative hold		Swing	N/A	

1902 Sevenoaks by-election
Party	Candidate	Votes	%	±%
Conservative	Henry Forster	5,333	54.6	−24.1
Liberal	Beaumont Morice	4,442	45.4	+24.1
Majority		891	9.2	−48.2
Turnout		9,775	63.4	+6.9
Registered electors		15,420		
Conservative hold		Swing	−24.1	

General election 1906: Sevenoaks
Party	Candidate	Votes	%	±%
Conservative	Henry Forster	7,219	51.1	−27.6
Liberal	Beaumont Morice	6,855	48.6	+27.3
Independent Liberal	Murray Spencer Richardson	44	0.3	New
Majority		364	2.5	−54.9
Turnout		14,118	81.8	+25.3
Registered electors		17,256		
Conservative hold		Swing	−27.5	

=== Elections in the 1910s ===
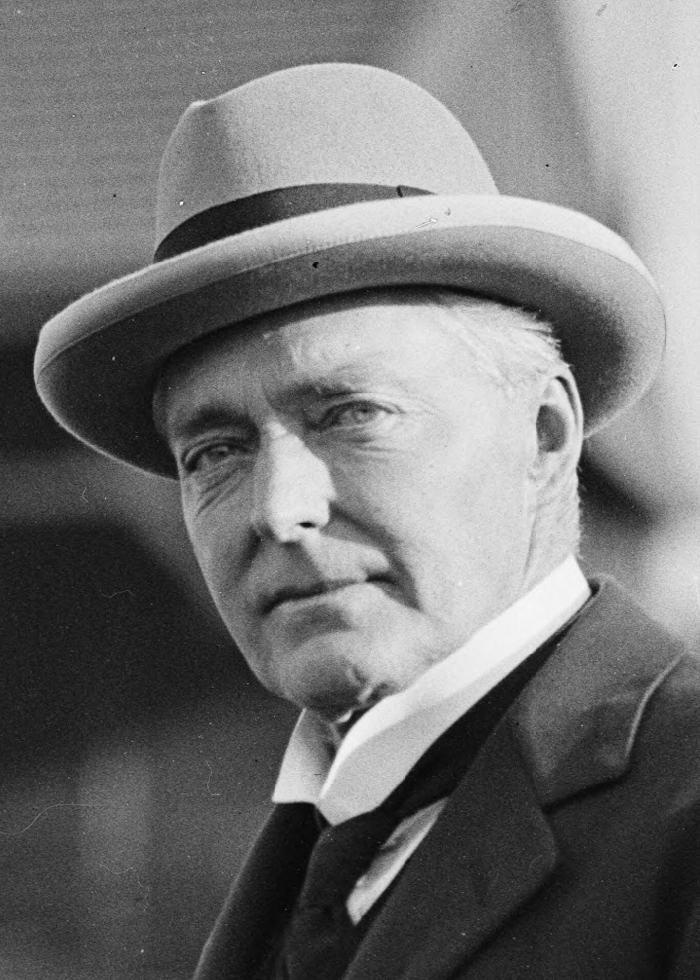
Forster

General election January 1910: Sevenoaks
Party	Candidate	Votes	%	±%
Conservative	Henry Forster	10,421	62.1	+11.0
Liberal	Frederic Lely	6,351	37.9	−10.7
Majority		4,070	24.2	+21.7
Turnout		16,772	88.1	+6.3
Registered electors		19,035		
Conservative hold		Swing	+11.0	

General election December 1910: Sevenoaks
Party	Candidate	Votes	%	±%
Conservative	Henry Forster	Unopposed		
Conservative hold				

General Election 1914–15:

Another General Election was required to take place before the end of 1915. The political parties had been making preparations for an election to take place and by July 1914, the following candidates had been selected;

- Unionist: Henry Forster
- Liberal: Leonard Powell

== See also ==
- List of parliamentary constituencies in Kent
- List of parliamentary constituencies in the South East England (region)
