= Stephen Jakobi =

English writer and human rights lawyer

Stephen Ronald Jakobi OBE (born 1935) is an English writer and human rights lawyer who is a former chief executive of Fair Trials Abroad (now Fair Trials), which he founded in 1992.

Jakobi, who was born in Ealing, London in 1935 to German-Jewish parents, Gerdy and Julius Jakobi, was brought up there and in Gerrards Cross, Buckinghamshire. When his parents divorced in 1945, he went to live with his father and was sent to boarding school at Malvern College. He graduated from Clare College, Cambridge in 1956 after doing National Service. He has a law degree from the University of Cambridge and an MA in creative writing from the University of Roehampton. He worked in industry before qualifying as a solicitor and was in private practice as a criminal lawyer before founding Fair Trials Abroad. He was appointed an Officer of the Order of the British Empire in 2005.

He and his wife Sally, a retired Jungian analyst, married in 1964 and live in Ham in the London Borough of Richmond upon Thames. They have a son, Nicholas, and a daughter, Francesca, who is a published novelist and a journalist with the Financial Times.

== Works ==
- Freeing the Innocent: From Bangkok Hilton to Guantanamo (2015), 272pp, Book Guild Publishing Ltd, ISBN 978-1909984950
- In the Mind of a Female Serial Killer (2017), 147pp, Pen and Sword Books, ISBN 978-1526709714
- Misjudged Murderesses: Female Injustice in Victorian Britain (2019), 256pp, Pen and Sword Books, ISBN 978-1526741622
