= William Ponsonby, 1st Baron de Mauley =

British politician (1787–1855)

The Lord de Mauley

Member of Parliament for Dorset
- In office 1832–1837

Member of Parliament for Knaresborough
- In office June–December 1832

Member of Parliament for Poole
- In office 1826–1831

Personal details
- Born: William Francis Spencer Ponsonby; 31 July 1787
- Died: 16 May 1855 (aged 67)
- Party: Whig
- Spouse: Barbara Ashley-Cooper (m. 1814)
- Children: 3, including Charles and Ashley
- Parents: Frederick Ponsonby (father); Henrietta Ponsonby (mother)
- Relatives: John Ponsonby (brother); Frederick Ponsonby (brother); Caroline Lamb (sister); William Ponsonby (grandfather); John Spencer (grandfather); Margaret Poyntz (grandmother)

William Francis Spencer Ponsonby, 1st Baron de Mauley (31 July 1787 – 16 May 1855), was an English Whig politician who sat in the House of Commons between 1826 and 1837. He was raised to the Peerage in 1838.

== Life ==
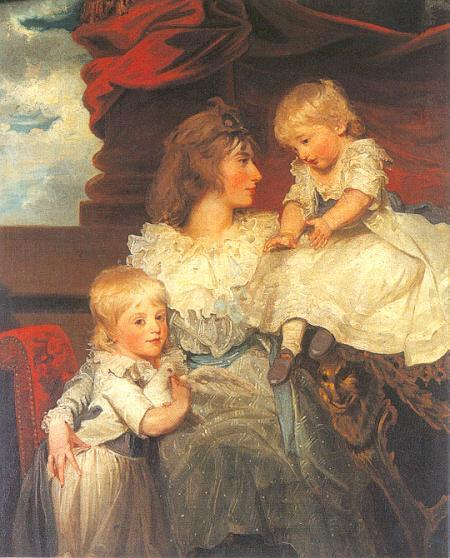
Henrietta Ponsonby, Countess of Bessborough, with her sons William and John by John Hoppner (1787)

Ponsonby was the youngest child of the 3rd Earl of Bessborough and his wife Henrietta Ponsonby, Countess of Bessborough.

Ponsonby was elected Member of Parliament for Poole in 1826 and held the seat until 1831, when he lost it in a by-election to Lord Ashley. He was then MP for Knaresborough between June and December 1832. At the 1832 UK general election, he was elected MP for Dorset and held the seat until 1837. On 10 July 1838, he was created Baron de Mauley, of Canford in the County of Dorset. Whilst an MP for Poole, Ponsonby, and Benjamin Lester opened Poole's first public library in 1830.

When the marriage of his sister Lady Caroline to William Lamb, 2nd Viscount Melbourne, began to break up, he strongly supported Caroline. Unfortunately, he was not noted for tact or intelligence—Melbourne's sister Emily Lamb, Countess Cowper, described him as being universally regarded as "an ass and a jackanapes". Ponsonby reminded Melbourne that the Lamb family were socially parvenu, and that his sister had married beneath her; although true, these remarks were so tactless that Melbourne broke off any further dealings with him.

== Family ==
On 8 August 1814, Ponsonby married Lady Barbara Ashley-Cooper (the only daughter and heir of the 5th Earl of Shaftesbury and a co-heir of the medieval barony of Mauley, 1789–1844). They had three children:

- Hon. Charles Frederick Ashley Cooper (1815–1896, later the 2nd Baron de Mauley)
- Hon. Frances Anne Georgiana (1817–1910), married George Kinnaird, 9th Lord Kinnaird.
- Hon. Ashley George John (1831–1898)

Parliament of the United Kingdom
Preceded by Benjamin Lester; John Dent	Member of Parliament for Poole; 1826–1831; With: Benjamin Lester	Succeeded by Benjamin Lester; Sir John Byng
Preceded by Hon. Henry Cavendish; George Tierney	Member of Parliament for Knaresborough; June–December 1832; With: Hon. Henry Cavendish	Succeeded by John Richards; Benjamin Rotch
Preceded by Edward Portman; Lord Ashley	Member of Parliament for Dorset; 1832–1837; Served alongside: Lord Ashley; William Bankes to 1835; Henry Sturt from 1835	Succeeded by Lord Ashley; John Fox-Strangways; Henry Sturt
Peerage of the United Kingdom
New creation	Baron de Mauley; 1838–1855	Succeeded by Charles Ponsonby
