= Sir John Rodgers, 1st Baronet =

British politician

Sir John Charles Rodgers, 1st Baronet (5 October 1906 – 29 March 1993), was a British Conservative politician.

Rodgers was educated at St Peter's School, York, and in France and Oxford. He became a scholar in modern history at Oxford and subsequently joined the staff of University College, Hull. He then entered the private sector becoming deputy chairman of the advertising agency J. Walter Thompson Ltd. During World War II, he worked in the Foreign Office, the Department of Overseas Trade (as director of post-war planning) and the Ministry of Production. He then worked in business, travelling widely and becoming chairman of the British Market Research Bureau. He was a member of the BBC General Advisory Council 1945–1952.

Rodgers was Member of Parliament for Sevenoaks from 1950 until 1979. He served as Parliamentary Private Secretary to David Eccles from 1951 and Parliamentary Secretary to the Board of Trade 1958–1960.

== Arms ==
Coat of arms of Sir John Rodgers, 1st Baronet

Crest
Two ravens' heads addorsed Sable and Gules both within a collar or pendant therefrom a rose Argent barbed and seeded.
Escutcheon
Azure two bars gemel dancetty Argent over all two palm branches in saltire enfiled through an ancient crown Or.
Motto
IIAOHMATA MAOHMATA (Experience Is Knowledge)

Parliament of the United Kingdom
Preceded by Charles Ponsonby	Member of Parliament for Sevenoaks; 1950–1979	Succeeded by Mark Wolfson
Baronetage of the United Kingdom
New creation	Baronet of Groombridge; 1964–1993	Succeeded by Tobias Rodgers
