= Charles Ponsonby, 2nd Baron de Mauley =

British peer and Liberal politician (1815–1896)

Member of Parliament for Dungarvan
- In office 1851–1852

Member of Parliament for Poole
- In office 1837–1847

Personal details
- Born: 12 September 1815
- Died: 24 August 1896 (aged 80)
- Party: Liberal
- Spouse: Maria Ponsonby (m. 1838)
- Children: 10, including William and Maurice
- Parent: William Ponsonby (father)
- Relatives: Ashley Ponsonby (brother); Frederick Ponsonby (grandfather); Anthony Ashley-Cooper (grandfather)
- Education: Trinity College, Cambridge

Charles Frederick Ashley Cooper Ponsonby, 2nd Baron de Mauley (12 September 1815 – 24 August 1896), was a British peer and Liberal politician.

== Biography ==
Ponsonby was the son of the first Lord de Mauley, the third son of the third Earl of Bessborough, and Lady Barbara Ashley-Cooper, only child and heiress of the fifth Earl of Shaftesbury. He attended Trinity College, Cambridge.

On 9 August 1838, he married his second cousin, Lady Maria Ponsonby, a daughter of John Ponsonby, 4th Earl of Bessborough; they had 10 children:

- Alice Barbara Maria (1840–1846)
- Emily Priscilla Maria (1841–1926), married Rev. Charles Ogilvy
- William Ashley Webb (1843–1918)
- George (1844–1845)
- Maurice John George (1846–1945), married Hon. Madeleine Hanbury-Tracy
- Frederick John William (1847–1933), married Margaret Howard (a great-granddaughter of Frederick Howard, 5th Earl of Carlisle)
- Mary Alice (1849–?)
- Edwin Charles William (1851–1939), married (1) Emily Coope, (2) Hilda Smith
- Helen Geraldine (1852–1949), married Sholto Douglas, 19th Earl of Morton
- Diana Isabel Maria (1855–?)

He lived at Langford House, Little Faringdon, Oxfordshire.

Parliament of the United Kingdom
Preceded by Charles Tulk; George Byng	Member of Parliament for Poole; 1837–1847; With: Sir George Philips	Succeeded by Sir George Philips; George Robinson
Preceded by Richard Sheil	Member of Parliament for Dungarvan; 1851–1852	Succeeded by John Maguire
Peerage of the United Kingdom
Preceded by William Ponsonby	Baron de Mauley; 1855–1896	Succeeded by William Ponsonby
