= Anthony Ashley-Cooper, 5th Earl of Shaftesbury =

British peer

Anthony Ashley-Cooper, 5th Earl of Shaftesbury DL FRS
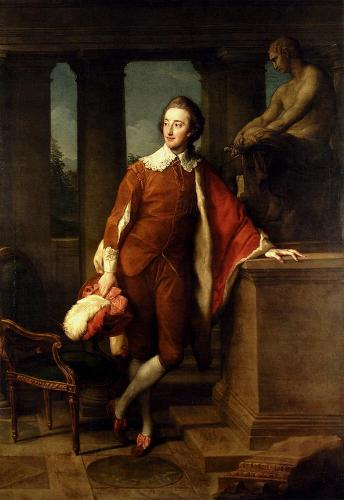
- Anthony Ashley-Cooper, 5th Earl of Shaftesbury by Pompeo Batoni
- Born: 17 September 1761
- Died: 14 May 1811 (aged 49)
- Spouse: Barbara Webb (m. 1786)
- Children: 1
- Father: Anthony Ashley-Cooper
- Relatives: Cropley Ashley-Cooper (brother); Anthony Ashley-Cooper (grandfather); Jacob Bouverie (grandfather)

Anthony Ashley-Cooper, 5th Earl of Shaftesbury DL FRS (17 September 1761 – 14 May 1811), was a British peer.

== Biography ==
Ashley-Cooper was the son of Anthony Ashley-Cooper, 4th Earl of Shaftesbury, and Mary Pleydell-Bouverie. He was educated at Winchester and served as Deputy Lieutenant of Dorset. He was elected a Fellow of the Royal Society in 1785.

Lord Shaftesbury married Barbara Webb, daughter of Sir John Webb, 5th Baronet, and Mary Salvain, of Odstock House, Wiltshire, on 17 July 1786. His only child, a daughter, was Lady Barbara Ashley-Cooper (19 October 1788 – 5 June 1844), who married the 1st Baron de Mauley.

Lord Shaftesbury died on 14 May 1811 at age 49 and was buried at St Giles' parish church in Wimborne St Giles, Dorset. On his death, having no male heir, the title passed to his younger brother, Cropley Ashley-Cooper.

Peerage of England
Preceded by Anthony Ashley Cooper	Earl of Shaftesbury; 1771–1811	Succeeded by Cropley Ashley-Cooper
