= Sir Charles Ponsonby, 1st Baronet =

British Conservative politician (1879–1976)

The Honourable Sir Charles Ponsonby, Bt TD DL

Member of Parliament for Sevenoaks
- In office 20 July 1935 – 23 February 1950
- Preceded by: Sir Hilton Young
- Succeeded by: Sir John Rodgers

Personal details
- Born: Charles Edward Ponsonby; 2 September 1879
- Died: 28 January 1976 (aged 96)
- Party: Conservative

Sir Charles Edward Ponsonby, 1st Baronet (2 September 1879 – 28 January 1976), was a British Conservative politician who sat in the House of Commons from 1935 to 1950.

== Early life and inheritance ==
A member of the prominent Ponsonby family, he was the son of the Hon. Edwin Charles William Ponsonby, who was the fifth son of Charles Ponsonby, 2nd Baron de Mauley, and Emily Dora Coope, the daughter of the brewing magnate Octavius Coope MP.

Ponsonby was educated at Eton College and Balliol College, Oxford.

He played cricket for Oxfordshire in the Minor Counties Championship from 1900 to 1903.

He was bequeathed a legacy of £1,000 in the will of his maternal grandfather Octavius Coope following the latter's death in 1886; Charles' mother Emily received a fifth-share of her father's estate, the total value of which was sworn at £540,000 for probate.

Following the death of his father in 1939 Charles inherited Woodleys House in Woodstock, Oxfordshire, which his father had purchased in 1882. His father's estate was valued at £42,612 (gross) and £35,044 (net).

== Career ==
After leaving University, Ponsonby initially pursued as a career as a solicitor before becoming a businessman.

=== Soldier ===
During the First World War, Ponsonby saw active served with the Queen's Own West Kent Yeomanry regiment and the 10th Yeomanry Battalion in the Gallipoli campaign, Sinai and Palestine campaign and in France, where he was awarded the Croix de Guerre.

=== Politician ===
Ponsonby was elected Member of Parliament (MP) for Sevenoaks at the by-election there in 1935. He held the seat until the 1950 general election. He served as Parliamentary Private Secretary to Anthony Eden during the latter's term as Secretary of State for War from May to December 1940, and again from 1941 to 1945 during Eden's second period as Foreign Secretary.

He was Honorary Colonel of the Kent Yeomanry from 1942 to 1949. He was created a baronet, of Wootton, in 1956.

=== Later career ===
Following his departure from the House of Commons, Ponsonby became a company director, serving periods as President of the Royal African Society and President of the Glass Manufacturer's Federation; he was also the Chairman of the Royal Commonwealth Society from 1954 to 1957.

In 1965 he published his memoir "Ponsonby Remembers", in which he described the "leisured days" of life in the House of Commons during the 1930s.

== Family ==
Ponsonby married the Hon. Winifred Marian Gibbs, daughter of Herbert Gibbs, 1st Baron Hunsdon, and Anna Maria Durant, on 23 July 1912. They had four daughters and a son.

- Priscilla Dora Ponsonby (1913–2000), who married the Premier Baronet of England in the United Kingdom Order of Precedence, Sir Edmund Bacon, 13th Baronet of Raveningham Hall, Norfolk on 15 January 1936.
  - Joanna Constance Bacon (b. 1937), who married The Hon. Edward Roundell Palmer (the third son of Roundell Palmer, 3rd Earl of Selborne) in 1957.
  - Lavinia Winifred Bacon (b. 1939), who served as a Trustee of the National Galleries of Scotland from 1986 - 1998. She married her first-cousin-once-removed Stephen Gibbs of Dougarie House, Isle of Arran, in 1972. Her husband was the son of Barclays Director the Hon. Sir Geoffrey Cokayne Gibbs of Clifton Hampden Manor, who in turn was also the son of Lavinia's great-grandfather Herbert Gibbs, 1st Baron Hunsdon.
  - Elizabeth Albinia Bacon (b. 1944), who married Ronald Hoare in 1971.
  - Sarah Bacon (b. 1947), who married Sir Paul Nicholson of Quarry Hill House, Brancepeth, County Durham, grandson of Sir Frank Nicholas CBE and Sir Thomas Lawson-Tancred, 9th Bt, in 1970.
  - Sir Nicholas Bacon, 14th Baronet (b. 1953), who served as a Page of Honour to Queen Elizabeth II from 1966 - 1969, and who has served as an Extra Equerry to King Charles III since March 2023. He married Susan Dinnis in 1981.
- Diana Mary Ponsonby (1916 - 2006), who was married on 4 July 1940 to The Reverend Mark Meynell, great-grandson of Charles Wood, 1st Viscount Halifax and maternal grandson of William Legge, 6th Earl of Dartmouth.
  - Christopher Mark Meynell (b. 1941), who married The Hon. Elizabeth Gretton, daughter of John Gretton, 2nd Baron Gretton and The Hon. Maud de Moleyns, in October 1968.
  - The Reverend Andrew Francis Meynell (b. 1943), who married Caroline Hobson, daughter of former Attorney General for England and Wales The Rt Hon Sir John Hobson MP, in 1971.
  - Peter John Meynell (b. 1947), who married Veronica Marten, daughter of Sir Neil Marten MP, in 1973.
  - Anna Mary Barbara Meynell (b. 1960), who married Savills agent Louis de Soissons in 1986.
- Lavinia Rosalind Ponsonby (1919 - 2005), who married Sir Michael Aubrey Hamilton on 16 May 1947.
  - John Ashley Hamilton (born 1948), who was married in 1975 to Audrey Carola Naper, daughter of Captain Nigel William Ivo Naper of Loughcrew House, Meath.
  - Caroline Mary Hamilton (born 1950), who married Stephen M. Codner in 1980.
  - Susanna Hamilton (born 1954), who married Rufus Anthony Reade in 1982.
  - Jane Lavinia Hamilton (born 1958), who married Garth K. P. Watkins in 1984.
- Ashley Charles Gibbs Ponsonby (1921–2010), who succeeded his father as 2nd Bt in 1976. He married Lady Martha Butler, daughter of Arthur Butler, 6th Marquess of Ormonde, on 14 September 1950.
  - Sir Charles Ashley Ponsonby, 3rd Bt (b. 1951), who succeeded as the 3rd Baronet following his father's death in 2010. He married Mary Priscilla Bromley Davenport in 1983; their wedding reception hosted by the bride's paternal uncle Sir Walter Bromley-Davenport at the ancestral home of the Davenport family, Capesthorne Hall, Cheshire.
  - Rupert Spencer Ponsonby (b. 1953), who was married in 1985 to Amanda Colvin, daughter of Michael Colvin MP, and maternal granddaughter of Nicholas Cayzer, Baron Cayzer.
  - Luke Arthur Ponsonby (b. 1957), who married Nicola Guy, daughter of Adjutant-General to the Forces General Sir Roland Guy, in 1985.
  - John Piers Ponsonby (b. 1962), who married Serena Marshall in 1994.
- Juliet Barbara Anna Ponsonby (1923 - 2019), who married on 25 June 1949 to James Edward Ramsden, who later served as the member of parliament for Harrogate from 1954 to 1974, and was the last person to hold the Cabinet post of Secretary of State for War.
  - Thomas James Ponsonby Ramsden (born 1950), who married Jane Ann Eustice, daughter of John Eustice, in 1983.
  - George Edward Ramsden (born 1953), who married Jane Slane Sloan Wynn (nee Thompson), daughter of the Rev. William Thompson, in 1986.
  - Richard Ashley Ramsden (born 1954), who married Kristin Maria Waldroup in 1978.
  - Emma Juliet Geraldine Ramsden (born 1957), who married the Rev. John G. W. Oliver in 1981.
  - Charlotte Mary Rose Ramsden (1960–1991), who married Mark Lawrence Cheverton in 1982.

=== Death ===
Charles died at the age of 96 in 1976; his only son Ashley Ponsonby succeeded him as Baronet.

Parliament of the United Kingdom
Preceded by Sir Hilton Young	Member of Parliament for Sevenoaks; 1935–1950	Succeeded by Sir John Rodgers
Baronetage of the United Kingdom
New creation	Baronet of Wootton; 1956–1976	Succeeded by Ashley Ponsonby
