= Andrew Symeou =

British author

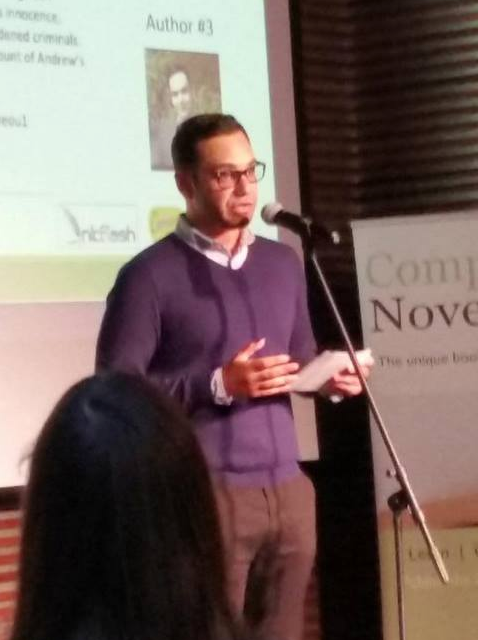
- Symeou in 2015
- Born: 16 October 1988 (age 37); United Kingdom, London
- Occupations: Writer, Memoirist, Author
- Writing career
- Notable awards: CompletelyNovel's Big Book Launch 2015 Winner

Andrew Symeou is a British-born memoirist and author of the book Extradited: The European Arrest Warrant and My Fight for Justice from a Greek Prison Cell (2015).

Symeou was falsely accused of attacking and killing holiday maker Jonathan Hiles in a Greek nightclub. The case gained public interest in 2009 when he was extradited to Greece on a European Arrest Warrant and spent a year in prison before trial. Most of his incarceration was spent in Korydallos prison; a high-security facility known for its bad conditions, inhumane treatment of inmates and gang-related violence. Symeou was found not guilty of the killing on 17 June 2011. In April 2013 British Coroner Mary Hassell accused the police of using brutality in the preliminary investigation and stated that the other evidence against Symeou had been concocted by the officers. It was found that Symeou was not in the nightclub at the time of the attack.

== Political impact ==
The case is notable for highlighting the problems with the European Arrest Warrant and how it operated. The consideration of evidence in a British court for an extradition request to another European state was illegal under EU law, regardless of evidence of innocence or a flawed investigation. Ex Deputy Prime Minister Nick Clegg stated; "No-one should ever have to go through what Andrew and the Symeou family went through. It was a travesty that they were made to suffer so much for so long. His case showed that there were real problems with the way the EAW was operating and that things needed to change as a result."

== Memoir ==
Symeou's book, Extradited, was published by Biteback Publishing in May 2015. The memoir was a winner of the CompletelyNovel big book launch 2015, which included authors who had written books on the theme of inspiring people and places.
