= Ronnie Fraser =

Scottish writer and Liberal Party politician

Ronnie Fraser

Thomas Ronald Leslie Fraser (3 February 1929 – 4 March 2010) was a Scottish writer, broadcaster and Liberal Party politician. He was notable for standing as a candidate for the United Kingdom parliament, even though he was too young to be eligible to vote.

== Background ==
Fraser was educated at McLaren High School, Strathallan School, Perthshire and the University of Glasgow, graduating with a degree in agriculture.

== Professional career ==
After graduation Fraser was appointed assistant lecturer in agricultural economics at Durham University. This was followed by three years in London, where he conducted research into agriculture, on the staff of the United States Embassy.

In 1960, Fraser was appointed editor of Farming News, where he worked for ten years, before it merged with The Scottish Farmer. He then worked freelance for various agricultural papers and trade magazines, and also the BBC.

Fraser was a member of the Trades House of Glasgow and served as Deacon of the Incorporation of Cordiners from 1969 to 1970. He was also chairman of the British Guild of Agricultural Journalists.

== Political career ==
Fraser got involved in politics at University and was assistant secretary of Glasgow University Liberal Club. In 1950, while still studying at university, he stood as the Scottish Liberal Party candidate in the 1950 United Kingdom general election for Glasgow Govan. Having only just celebrated his 21st birthday, Fraser was the youngest of the 475 Liberal candidates standing, and was the youngest candidate in the election. He legitimately stood as a candidate even though he was actually too young to vote. In 1918 the provisions of the Representation of the People Act 1918 allowed for people aged 21 to stand as candidates. Young people only had their name added to the electoral register once they had become 21 and electoral registers were only published once a year in February. The 1950 General Election was fought on the 1949/50 register on which his name was not included because he was too young. Subsequent electoral registration practices changed to include people coming of age during the life of the register. His candidacy was not a success and he finished third out of four candidates. After the election he became president of Glasgow University Liberal Club, serving from 1950 to 1951. He did not contest the 1951 General Election.

As a Liberal, Fraser supported Scottish Home Rule and was a supporter of the Scottish Covenant Association. The greatest coup of the Covenant Association was the removal of the Stone of Destiny from Westminster Abbey by four of their members (Ian Hamilton, Kay Matheson, Gavin Vernon and Alan Stuart) over Christmas in 1950. This famous act attracted huge publicity for the cause of Scottish home rule. Fraser's parents house in Carlisle, where he was staying, was used as a base for some of those organising the transport of the stone across the border into Scotland.

Fraser was chairman of the Scottish League of Young Liberals. He was elected president of the Glasgow University Union for the 1952–53 academic year. Once again, he stood as Liberal candidate at the 1955 General Election but this time at the more promising seat of West Aberdeenshire. However, in a difficult election for the Liberal party, he finished third. He did not contest any of the next three general elections. In 1970 he was again Liberal candidate, this time for Banffshire. He again finished third, narrowly behind the SNP candidate. He fought Banff again at the February 1974 election without improving his position. After this he did not stand for parliament again.

Fraser was the founder and first chairman of the Scottish branch of Liberal International. In 2008 he was elected president of the Argyll and Bute Scottish Liberal Democrats.

=== Electoral record ===
General Election 1950: Glasgow Govan
Party	Candidate	Votes	%	±%
Unionist	Jack Browne	19,267	46.6	
Labour	J Davis	18,894	45.7	
Liberal	Thomas Ronald Leslie Fraser	1,628	3.9	
Communist	W Laughlan	1,547	3.8	
Majority		373	0.9	
Turnout			84.0	
Unionist gain from Labour		Swing		

General Election 1955: West Aberdeenshire
Party	Candidate	Votes	%	±%
Unionist	Henry Reginald Spence	20,216	59.1	
Labour	Miss Mary MacNeil	9,288	27.1	
Liberal	Thomas Ronald Leslie Fraser	4,705	13.8	
Majority		10,928	31.9	
Turnout		34,209	72.6	
Unionist hold		Swing		

General Election 1970: Banffshire
Party	Candidate	Votes	%	±%
Conservative	Wilfred Baker	8,457	38.71	
SNP	Hamish Watt	5,006	22.91	
Liberal	Thomas Ronald Leslie Fraser	4,589	21.01	
Labour	A.F. Walls	3,795	17.37	
Majority		3,451	15.80	
Conservative hold		Swing		

General Election February 1974: Banffshire
Party	Candidate	Votes	%	±%
SNP	Hamish Watt	11,037	46.1	
Conservative	Wilfred Baker	8,252	34.5	
Liberal	Thomas Ronald Leslie Fraser	3,121	13.0	
Labour	R Dool	1,528	6.4	
Majority		2,785	11.6	
Turnout			75.7	
SNP gain from Conservative		Swing		
