= Lewisham East (London County Council constituency) =

London County Council constituency

- Former constituency for the London County Council

Former constituency
- Created: 1919
- Abolished: 1949
- Member(s): 2
- Created from: Lewisham
- Replaced by: Lewisham North and Lewisham South

Lewisham East was a constituency used for elections to the London County Council between 1919 and 1949. The seat shared boundaries with the UK Parliament constituency of the same name.

== Councillors ==
Year	Name	Party	Name	Party
1919	Eric Ball	Municipal Reform	Richard Owen Roberts	Municipal Reform
1925	John Littlejohns	Municipal Reform	Walter Waring	Municipal Reform
1928	Joseph Benskin	Municipal Reform	Paul Latham	Municipal Reform
1934	Amy Crossman	Labour	Walter Richard Owen	Labour
1937	William Hare	Labour	Walter Richard Owen	Labour
1946	Edmund Henry Hambly	Labour	Walter Richard Owen	Labour

== Election results ==
1919 London County Council election: Lewisham East
Party	Candidate	Votes	%	±%
Municipal Reform	Eric Ball	Unopposed	n/a	n/a
Municipal Reform	Richard Owen Roberts	Unopposed	n/a	n/a
Municipal Reform hold		Swing	n/a	
Municipal Reform hold		Swing	n/a	

1922 London County Council election: Lewisham East
Party	Candidate	Votes	%	±%
Municipal Reform	Eric Ball	11,759	37.1	n/a
Municipal Reform	Richard Owen Roberts	11,288	35.6	n/a
Labour	W. J. R. Gillings	4,392	13.8	n/a
Labour	J. W. Matthews	4,295	13.5	n/a
Majority		6,896	21.8	n/a
Municipal Reform hold		Swing	n/a	
Municipal Reform hold		Swing	n/a	

1925 London County Council election: Lewisham East
Party	Candidate	Votes	%	±%
Municipal Reform	John Littlejohns	8,594		
Municipal Reform	Walter Waring	8,191		
Labour	J. W. Matthews	4,986		
Labour	W. J. K. Gillings	4,785		
Majority				
Municipal Reform hold		Swing		
Municipal Reform hold		Swing		

1928 London County Council election: Lewisham East
Party	Candidate	Votes	%	±%
Municipal Reform	Joseph Benskin	9,737		
Municipal Reform	Paul Latham	9,543		
Labour	T. R. Richardson	6,485		
Labour	D. C. Cummings	6,369		
Liberal	C. H. Dodd	4,752		
Liberal	C. J. Robinson	4,365		
Majority				
Municipal Reform hold		Swing		
Municipal Reform hold		Swing		

1931 London County Council election: Lewisham East
Party	Candidate	Votes	%	±%
Municipal Reform	Joseph Benskin	12,714		
Municipal Reform	Paul Latham	12,678		
Labour	Catherine Mary Wadham	9,803		
Labour	Walter Richard Owen	9,772		
Majority				
Municipal Reform hold		Swing		
Municipal Reform hold		Swing		

1934 London County Council election: Lewisham East
Party	Candidate	Votes	%	±%
Labour	Walter Richard Owen	13,029		
Labour	Amy Crossman	12,856		
Municipal Reform	Paul Latham	12,642		
Municipal Reform	Joseph Benskin	12,499		
Majority				
Labour gain from Municipal Reform		Swing		
Labour gain from Municipal Reform		Swing		

1937 London County Council election: Lewisham East
Party	Candidate	Votes	%	±%
Labour	Walter Richard Owen	17,899		
Labour	William Hare	17,666		
Municipal Reform	Neville Pearson	16,865		
Municipal Reform	Eric Ball	16,689		
Majority				
Labour hold		Swing		
Labour hold		Swing		

1946 London County Council election: Lewisham East
Party	Candidate	Votes	%	±%
Labour	Edmund Henry Hambly	18,677		
Labour	Walter Richard Owen	18,638		
Conservative	N. W. Farmer	11,214		
Conservative	E. Ratcliffe Hoare	11,087		
Majority				
Labour hold		Swing		
Labour hold		Swing		
