= Charles Waring =

British politician

Charles Waring MP

Member of Parliament for Poole
- In office 5 February 1874 – 13 May 1874 Serving with David James Jenkins
- Preceded by: Arthur Guest
- Succeeded by: Evelyn Ashley
- In office 12 July 1865 – 17 November 1868 Serving with Henry Danby Seymour
- Preceded by: Henry Danby Seymour; George Woodroffe Franklyn
- Succeeded by: Arthur Guest

Personal details
- Born: 1827 Ecclesall, Sheffield
- Died: 26 August 1887 (aged 59–60) Wycombe Abbey, High Wycombe
- Party: Liberal Unionist
- Other political affiliations: Liberal
- Relations: Walter Waring
- Parent: John Waring

Charles Waring (1827 – 26 August 1887) was a Liberal Party and Liberal Unionist Party politician.

Waring was elected Liberal MP for Poole in 1865 but, when the seat was reduced to one member in 1868, he failed to retain the seat. He stood again in 1874, and was elected, but was unseated when the election was declared void on petition after "corrupt conduct and treating". He stood again for the seat in 1880, but was unsuccessful. Shortly before his death, Waring joined the Liberal Unionist Party. His son, Walter Waring, was later elected as the Liberal MP for Banffshire at a by-election in 1907.

Waring was the brother of William and Henry Waring, who formed railway engineering firm Waring Brothers in 1841.

During his life, Waring was made a Chevalier of the Order of Leopold of Belgium, and a Chevalier of the Order of Saints Maurice and Lazarus. He also often contributed to political journal The Fortnightly Review, writing on topics such as the railway industry and the Suez Canal.

On 1 April 1851, he was elected an associate of the Institution of Civil Engineers.

Parliament of the United Kingdom
Preceded by Arthur Guest	Member of Parliament for Poole; 1874–1874	Succeeded by Evelyn Ashley
Preceded by Henry Danby Seymour; George Woodroffe Franklyn	Member of Parliament for Poole; 1865–1868; With: Henry Danby Seymour	Succeeded by Arthur Guest
