= A. W. Black =

A. W. Black may refer to:

- Arthur Black (Liberal politician) (1863–1947), Nottingham businessman and Member of Parliament (MP) for Biggleswade 1906–1918
- Alexander William Black (1859–1906), MP for Banffshire 1900–1906
