= John McWilliam =

British politician (1941–2009)

Member of Parliament for Blaydon
- In office 3 May 1979 – 11 April 2005
- Preceded by: Robert Woof
- Succeeded by: David Anderson

Personal details
- Born: John David McWilliam; 16 May 1941 Grangemouth, Scotland
- Died: 14 November 2009 (aged 68) Perth, Scotland
- Party: Labour
- Spouses: Lesley Mary Catling (m. 1965; div. 1992); Mary McLoughlin (m. 1994; div. 1997); Helena Lovegreen (m. 1998)
- Children: 2 (by Catling)
- Education: Leith Academy
- Profession: Engineer

John David McWilliam (16 May 1941 – 14 November 2009) was a British Labour politician who served as Member of Parliament (MP) for Blaydon from 1979 until he stood down at the 2005 general election.

== Early life ==
Born in Grangemouth, the son of Alexander McWilliam, a post office engineer, he went to Leith Academy. He later attended evening classes as a Post Office Telephones Youth in Training at Heriot-Watt Technical College and Napier College of Science and Technology.

McWilliam joined the Labour party in 1966, and prior to his election he worked as a telephone engineer, Technician 2A, for British Telecom

== Parliamentary career ==
While a City of Edinburgh councillor, McWilliam fought Edinburgh Pentlands in February 1974, but was defeated by Malcolm Rifkind. He was subsequently elected for Blaydon at the 1979 election just as the Callaghan government left office. He served briefly as deputy shadow leader of the House of Commons, before becoming an opposition whip. He resigned from this role in 1987 in protest at the sacking of two of his colleagues. McWilliam served on the Defence Select Committee for 12 years, between 1987 and 1999.

When Betty Boothroyd retired as Speaker of the House of Commons, McWilliam was one of the 12 candidates nominated to succeed her. In the election on 23 October 2000 he received 30 votes, the fewest of any of the candidates.

He stood down at the 2005 general election after 26 years as an MP, and returned to living in Scotland where he died in November 2009.

== Personal life ==
He married Lesley Mary Catling on 6 February 1965. They had two daughters (Ruth Lesley, born 29 February 1972 and Fiona Alexandra, born 20 June 1974) and divorced in 1992. He married Mary McLoughlin on 31 March 1994. They divorced in 1997. He married Helena Lovegreen in March 1998; that union ended in 2009, when McWilliam died in hospital of Pneumonia in Perth

Parliament of the United Kingdom
Preceded by Robert Woof	Member of Parliament for Blaydon; 1979–2005	Succeeded by David Anderson
