= Lewisham South (London County Council constituency) =

London County Council constituency

- Former constituency for the London County Council

Former constituency
- Created: 1949
- Abolished: 1965
- Member(s): 3
- Created from: Lewisham East

Lewisham South was a constituency used for elections to the London County Council between 1949 and the council's abolition, in 1965. The seat shared boundaries with the UK Parliament constituency of the same name.

== Councillors ==
Year	Name	Party	Name	Party	Name	Party
1949	Walter Richard Owen	Labour	Edmund Henry Hambly	Labour	Tom Gillinder	Labour
1958	Frederick Hawes	Labour	Edmund Henry Hambly	Labour	Tom Gillinder	Labour
1961	Frederick Hawes	Labour	Edmund Henry Hambly	Liberal	Tom Gillinder	Labour

== Election results ==
1949 London County Council election: Lewisham South
Party	Candidate	Votes	%	±%
Labour	Walter Richard Owen	16,639		
Labour	Edmund Henry Hambly	16,379		
Labour	Tom Gillinder	16,245		
Conservative	Swash	12,864		
Conservative	J. G. Weeple	12,756		
Conservative	D. Brooks	12,718		

1952 London County Council election: Lewisham South
Party	Candidate	Votes	%	±%
Labour	Tom Gillinder	18,967		
Labour	Walter Richard Owen	18,944		
Labour	Edmund Henry Hambly	18,815		
Conservative	A. Beattie	11,422		
Conservative	A. Tennant	11,254		
Conservative	M. Thirlby	11,128		
Labour hold		Swing		

1955 London County Council election: Lewisham South
Party	Candidate	Votes	%	±%
Labour	Walter Richard Owen	15,216		
Labour	Tom Gillinder	15,107		
Labour	Edmund Henry Hambly	15,097		
Conservative	D. E. New	8,782		
Conservative	G. J. Smith	8,580		
Conservative	A. D. Bartlett	8,491		
Labour hold		Swing		

1958 London County Council election: Lewisham South
Party	Candidate	Votes	%	±%
Labour	Tom Gillinder	14,669		
Labour	Edmund Henry Hambly	14,599		
Labour	Frederick Hawes	14,255		
Conservative	R. W. Scott	6,284		
Conservative	M. Hill	6,260		
Conservative	D. Mappin	6,249		
Independent	George Forrester	502		
Labour hold		Swing		

1961 London County Council election: Lewisham South
Party	Candidate	Votes	%	±%
Labour	Tom Gillinder	14,336		
Labour	Frederick Hawes	14,311		
Labour	Edmund Henry Hambly	14,290		
Conservative	John Hunt	8,865		
Conservative	J. E. McDonald	8,508		
Conservative	A. R. Tyrrell	8,213		
Liberal	A. Marchant	2,303		
Liberal	Francis Michael Bennett	2,299		
Liberal	T. E. J. Bean	2,203		
Alert Party	George Forrester	489		
Alert Party	C. Vincent	183		
Labour hold		Swing		
