= Lachlan Gordon-Duff =

British politician

Lachlan Duff Gordon-Duff (1 June 1817 – 10 January 1892) was a British politician. He was elected as a Member of Parliament for Banffshire in 1857 and resigned through appointment as Steward of the Chiltern Hundreds on 22 April 1861.

He was the son of Thomas Duff Gordon (1790–1855) and Joanna Maria Grant (1798–1872), daughter of David McDowall-Grant and Mary Eleanor Macdowall Grant.

He married Jane Butterfield, daughter of Thomas Butterfield, Chief Justice of Bermuda, on 6 April 1847.

He died at Drummuir Castle and is buried at Ordiquhill.

Parliament of the United Kingdom
| Preceded by James Duff | Member of Parliament for Banffshire; 1857–1861 | Succeeded by Robert Duff |
