= Edward Archibald Hume =

Chief Magistrate of colonial Gambia

Captain Edward Archibald Hume (25 December 1878 - 27 August 1915) held the office of Chief Magistrate of colonial Gambia (now called office of the Chief Justice of the Gambia) from 1909 until 1913. After his retirement from colonial service he was selected as the Conservative and Unionist Party candidate in the 1914 general election for the Banffshire constituency. However the election was deferred due to World War I.

== Personal life ==
Hume was born in Paddington, the second son of Edward Hume and his wife, Agnes Mary (née Foster).

He was educated at St. David's prep school in Reigate and then, like his brothers, attended Winchester College (1892-1897). He completed his degree at Trinity College, Oxford, in 1900. He married Violet Mary Hope on 30 July 1912.

== Death ==
He fought in the First World War and died in active service as a Captain in the 7th Battalion South Staffordshire Regiment. At Gallipoli he received a bullet wound in the spine on 25 July 1915 and he died on a hospital ship on 27 August 1915. He was buried at sea, his name is commemorated on the Helles Memorial.
