= Edward Hume (cricketer) =

English cricketer (1841–1921)

Personal information
- Full name: Edward Hume
- Born: 25 September 1841; Scaldwell, Northamptonshire, England
- Died: 24 October 1921 (aged 80); Totland Bay, Isle of Wight, England
- Batting: Right-handed

Domestic team information
- Years: Team
- 1861–1863: Oxford University
- 1867: Marylebone Cricket Club

Career statistics
Competition	First-class
Matches	8
Runs scored	102
Batting average	8.50
100s/50s	–/–
Top score	26*
Catches/stumpings	4/–
- Source: Cricinfo, 13 August 2019

Edward Hume (25 September 1841 – 24 October 1921) was an English first-class cricketer.

The son of William Wheeler Hume, he was born in September 1841 at Scaldwell, Northamptonshire. He was educated at Marlborough College, where he was coached in cricket by Robert Carpenter.

Matriculating at Trinity College, Oxford in 1860, Hume graduated B.A. in 1863. While studying at Oxford, he made his debut in first-class cricket for Oxford University against the Marylebone Cricket Club (MCC) at Oxford in 1861. He played first-class cricket for Oxford until 1863, making six appearances and scoring 74 runs, with a high score of 21.

Then admitted to Lincoln's Inn, Hume was called to the bar in 1867. In the same year that he was called to the bar, he also made a first-class appearance for the MCC, against Oxford University at Lord's. Hume made a final first-class appearance in 1879 for the Gentlemen of England against the Gentlemen of Kent at Canterbury. He served on the committee of the MCC from 1881–85 and was an examiner of the High Court from 1884.

== Personal Life ==
Hume married Agnes Mary (née Foster), their second son was Edward Archibald Hume, he and two other sons attended Winchester College.

He died at Totland Bay on the Isle of Wight in October 1921.
