= William Duthie =

British politician (1892–1980)

Sir William Smith Duthie (22 May 1892 – 17 December 1980) was a Conservative Party politician in the United Kingdom. During World War II he served as Director of Emergency Bread Supplies at the Ministry of Food, and was awarded an OBE in the 1943 New Year Honours.

He was Member of Parliament (MP) for Banffshire from 1945 until his retirement at the 1964 general election. He was knighted in the 1959 Birthday Honours for political and public services.

Parliament of the United Kingdom
Preceded by John Findlay	Member of Parliament for Banffshire; 1945 – 1964	Succeeded by Wilfred Baker
