= Thomas Martin (Conservative politician) =

British politician

Member of Parliament for Blaydon
- In office 27 October 1931 – 14 November 1935
- Preceded by: William Whiteley
- Succeeded by: William Whiteley

Personal details
- Born: 13 November 1901
- Died: 28 January 1995 (aged 93)
- Party: Conservative

Thomas Ballantyne Martin (13 November 1901 – 28 January 1995) was a British politician, stockbroker and journalist.

After an early career as a private secretary he was unexpectedly elected as a Conservative Member of Parliament for Blaydon, a traditionally extremely secure Labour constituency. After standing up in Parliament for the local mining industry he opted out of defending his seat, and could not find election elsewhere; he then became a political journalist.

Following wartime service in intelligence, Martin supported Winston Churchill's attempt to bring European unity and then became a stockbroker. A very clubbable man, he attracted interest in the 1990s as a rare survivor of the pre-Second World War Parliament.

== Education ==
Martin was the son of Angus Martin, a surgeon from Forest Hall in Northumberland; his mother Robina was from Wooler. He grew up in the borders area but went to Giggleswick School boarding school, and later matriculated at Jesus College, Cambridge, where he graduated with a Master of Arts.

== Election in Blaydon ==
During the 1920s Martin worked as a private secretary, and was on the staff of the Turkish Embassy in London as its English Secretary in 1928 and in 1930–31. He undertook a lecture tour of Germany in 1929. In October 1931, when the general election was already underway, he was adopted as Conservative Party candidate for the constituency of Blaydon in County Durham; the seat had a Labour majority of 13,374 and was thought absolutely safe. However Martin was elected with a majority of 496 as part of the landslide election victory of the National Government; his win was the only time that the seat had been won by a Conservative.

== Unparliamentary language ==
Martin's first recorded contribution in the chamber of the House of Commons came in December 1931 during bad tempered scenes. Angered by opposition Members jeering at Prime Minister Ramsay MacDonald he was overheard by Labour MP Valentine MacEntee shouting out "Lie down, dog!"; MacEntee raised a point of order and challenged him to repeat it outside. The Deputy Speaker Robert Bourne pronounced it unparliamentary and urged Martin to restrain his exuberance.

== Mining industry ==
In Parliament, Martin concentrated on issues which affected the working lives of his mining constituents. In May 1932 he made his maiden speech on the Coal Mines Bill, urging a system where the mine owner had a guaranteed profit, while the miner had a guaranteed minimum wage, with additions according to the business done. He also endorsed a voluntary national levy on the coal trade to help exports. He accepted that other industries should not be sacrificed to help the coal trade, but urged that operating theatres be set up near to mines to help miners who had suffered industrial accidents.

Martin moved an amendment to the 1933 Budget to limit the tax on hydrocarbon oils to no more than 10%. The Government opposed his amendment and the House of Commons rejected it by 228 to 58. He also voted against the Government and in support of an amendment to remove the profits of Co-operative Societies from tax. He initially supported the National Government's efforts to help distressed areas, urging that the grants be continued until the Unemployment Act replaced them, but by December 1934 was disappointed on behalf of himself and other younger supporters of the Government to find the latest proposals which would not help the basic industries. Martin stated that he could not go back to depressed areas in his constituency and tell them that the Government's policy was a solution to all their problems.

== Germany ==
While a member of parliament, Martin visited Germany where he met leading Nazis Hitler, Goering and Goebbels; he was invited to a Nuremberg rally, but also visited Dachau. When he returned to Britain, Martin warned fellow members of parliament about the dangers of Nazism. He was one of 31 members of parliament to sign a letter endorsing an All-India Federation with provincial autonomy as a way forward of constitutional reform in India.

== 1935 election ==
He was also much preoccupied with pushing forward a new constitution for the University of Durham. Preparing for the next general election, Martin decided not to defend Blaydon, but was instead adopted as candidate for Camberwell North in inner south London in May 1935. The sitting MP Arthur Bateman had stepped down although at one stage considered standing for neighbouring Peckham as an Independent candidate.

At the previous election, Camberwell North had produced a Conservative majority of 765, almost as small as at Blaydon. Martin joined the other Conservative candidates for Camberwell divisions in inviting Winston Churchill to speak for them; but observers expected that the leading Labour personality Charles Ammon would succeed in regaining the seat he had lost four years previously. Martin was in the end beaten by nearly two to one, with a substantial majority of 5,777 against him.

== Daily Telegraph journalist ==
After losing his seat, Martin returned to the Palace of Westminster the next year as a political correspondent of The Daily Telegraph, where he remained until 1940. He was also assistant editor of The Spectator, becoming a regular houseguest of Lady Londonderry and of the Astor family at Cliveden. He was a liaison officer between the Foreign Office and the BBC and then volunteered for military service during the Second World War, becoming a Squadron Leader in the Middle East Intelligence Centre (part of the Royal Air Force Volunteer Reserve) from 1940 to 1943, then leaving the services to become adviser on public relations to the United Kingdom High Commissioner in Australia where he remained until the end of the war.

== European unity ==
In the 1945 general election, Martin was the Conservative Party candidate in Houghton-le-Spring where he was defeated by 21,866 votes. Martin then became secretary of the United European Movement in 1947, working closely with Winston Churchill for a year before becoming Secretary of the British all-party delegation to the Congress of Europe at The Hague in 1948. There Churchill developed his support for European unity, an attitude of which Martin approved. Martin regretted that Churchill did not maintain his enthusiasm when he returned to government in 1951.

== Later life ==
Martin developed his career by becoming a member of the London Stock Exchange in 1949, but retained his interest in politics and contributed many letters to newspapers. In 1953 he married for the first time, Jean Bennett; they had two daughters. In 1964 Martin and Dr Charles Goodson-Wickes reformed the Kit Cat Club as an attempt to restart an 18th-century Whig dining club; it gathered a significant membership, many of whom entered public life (Dr Goodson-Wickes himself became a member of parliament). After his retirement from the Stock Exchange in 1974, Martin moved back to the borders area of Northumberland where he lived at Naworth Keep and Dacre Castle. He retained his membership of Pratt's Club where he was said to be "in his element leading the conversation at the head of the table"; so welcome was he at the club that when he resigned his membership owing to the decreasing number of visits to London, the club proprietor the Duke of Devonshire refused to accept it and waived the subscription to keep him.

In 1990 the Speaker of the House of Commons Bernard Weatherill held a dinner in honour of the 23 remaining pre-war MPs at which Martin was one of the star guests; he was interviewed by the BBC afterwards. He appeared in a 1994 documentary on "Westminster at War" which interviewed the survivors of the era about what political life was like. He remained mentally alert but in his later years became physically infirm, which he recognised as "a downward glide" to a serene death.

Parliament of the United Kingdom
Preceded by William Whiteley	Member of Parliament for Blaydon; 1931 – 1935	Succeeded by William Whiteley
