= David Myles (Scottish politician) =

British politician (1925–2018)

David Fairlie Myles CBE MP (30 May 1925 – 16 December 2018) was a Scottish Conservative Party politician and public servant.

== Biography ==
Myles was elected Member of Parliament for Banffshire in 1979, gaining the seat from the Scottish National Party incumbent Hamish Watt by less than 800 votes. He was a member of the select committees on agriculture and European affairs. In 1983, the constituency was abolished by boundary changes and Myles stood unsuccessfully in the Liberal Party stronghold of Orkney and Shetland.

In 1984 Myles was elected to Angus District Council and was leader of the Conservative group. He was an active member of a number of quangos linked to agricultural and rural issues. These included: Angus Tourist Board (1984–92); the North of Scotland Hydro-Electric Board (1985–88); the Potato Marketing Board (1988–97). He also chaired the Dairy Produce Quota Tribunal for Scotland (1984–97). Myles served on the Guildry of Brechin, a former Royal burgh, and was a past Lord President of the Court of Deans of Guild of Scotland (1995–6).

Myles parents were Robert C Myles and Mary Anne Fairlie. He attended Brechin High School and served in the Royal Marines. After the end of World War II, he returned to work with his father at Dalbog farm, Edzell, taking over the hill farm's tenancy in 1958.

Myles married Janet Gall in 1951. They had four children.

Myles was appointed CBE in the 1988 Birthday Honours for political and public service.

Parliament of the United Kingdom
Preceded by Hamish Watt	Member of Parliament for Banffshire; 1979–1983	Constituency abolished
