= Tom Gillinder =

British politician and trade unionist

Thomas William Gillinder (1887–1968) was a British politician and trade unionist.

Born in North East England, Gillinder began working in engineering, and joined the Amalgamated Society of Engineers in 1906, while based in Newcastle-upon-Tyne. He subsequently relocated to North West England, where he became active in the Labour Party. At the 1922 United Kingdom general election, he stood for the party in Ashton-under-Lyne, taking 42.4% of the vote and second place. He next stood in Sunderland at the 1923 United Kingdom general election, taking last place, and finally Liverpool Walton at the 1924 United Kingdom general election, where he took another second place, with 36.8% of the votes cast.

In 1925, Gillinder moved to Lewisham in London. There, he chairing the Lewisham South Constituency Labour Party for many years, and also served on the committees of several local hospitals. He was elected to London County Council in 1949, representing Lewisham South. He stood down as chair of the local party in 1959, and thereafter reduced his activity, but remained a member of the county council until it was abolished, in 1965.

Between the world wars, Gillinder was also active in the League of Nations Union.
