= Henry Danby Seymour =

British politician

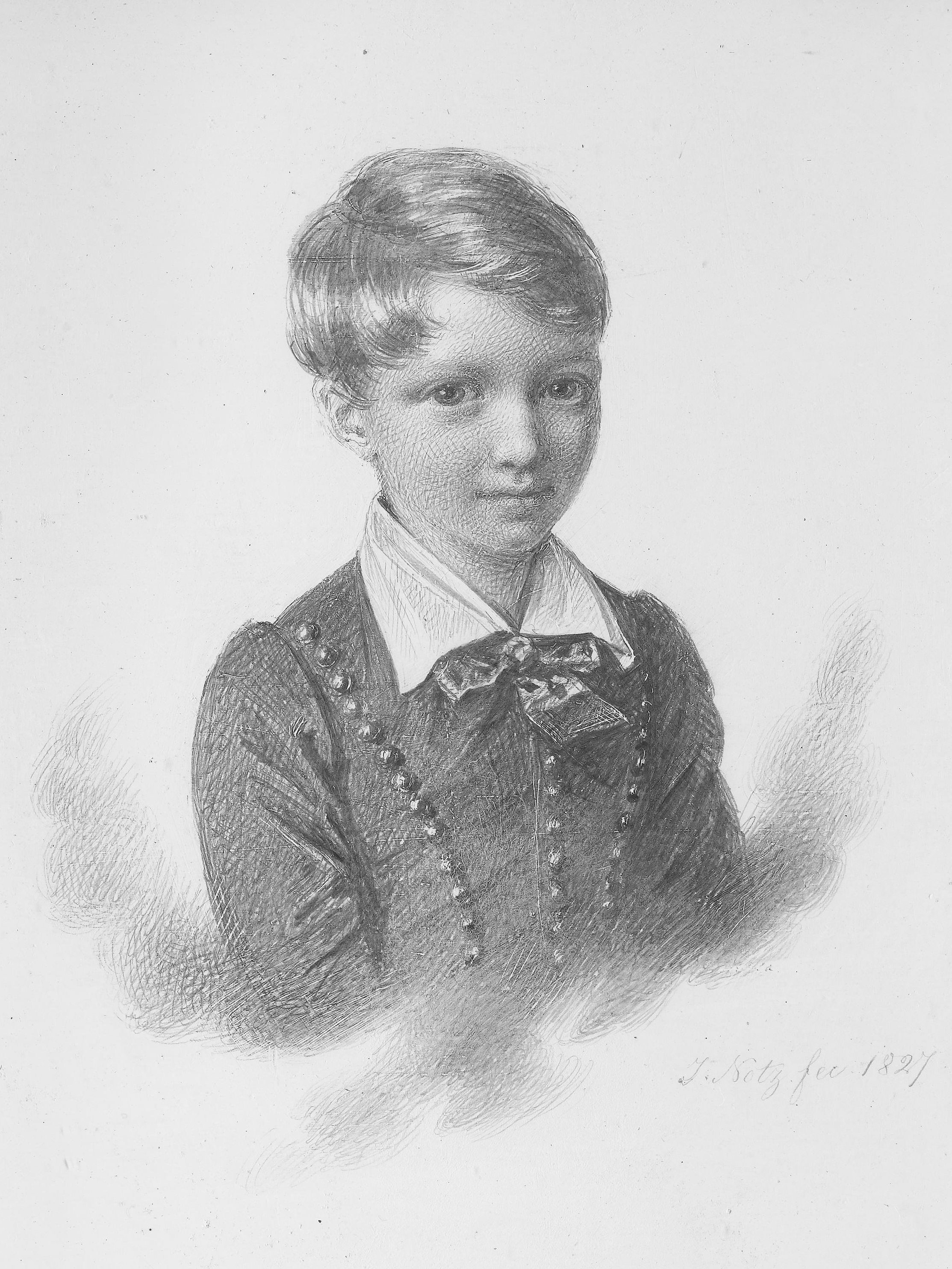
Henry Danby Seymour as a child, 1827

Henry Danby Seymour (1 July 1820 – 4 August 1877) was a British gentleman and Liberal Party politician.

== Life ==
Seymour was the eldest son of Henry Seymour and wife Jane Hopkinson. Alfred Seymour was his brother. He matriculated at Christ Church, Oxford in 1838, graduating B.A. in 1842. In 1862 he was called to the bar at Lincoln's Inn.

A member of the Liberal Party, Seymour sat as Member of Parliament (MP) for Poole from 1850 to 1868 and served as Joint Secretary to the Board of Control, the body which oversaw the activities of the East India Company, from 1855 until the Company's abolition in 1858. In November 1876 he was elected to the London School Board.

== Works ==
Seymour climbed Mount Ararat with Khachatur Abovian in 1846, and wrote two topographical works, Russia on the Black Sea and Sea of Azof and Caravan Journeys and Wanderings in Persia, Afghanistan, Turkistan, and Beloochistan.

In 1856 Seymour donated fragments of the Tomb of Sobekhotep, Thebes, to the British Museum. He translated as A History of Egypt Under the Pharaohs a work in two volumes by Heinrich Karl Brugsch, with Philip Smith: this was published in 1879, after his death.

== Collector ==
Seymour gathered a large collection of Old Masters, among other things Albrecht Dürer's Portrait of a Peasant Woman (now in the British Museum), and the triptych attributed to Goswin van der Weyden entitled St Catherine and the Philosophers (now in the National Gallery, London). He also owned a cabinet embellished with Japanese lacquer panels and ormolu mounts attributed to Adam Weisweiller which was delivered to Louis XVI at Versailles in 1784. Seymour loaned the cabinet to the Victoria and Albert Museum one year prior to his death in 1877.

Parliament of the United Kingdom
| Preceded by George Richard Robinson; Sir George Philips | Member of Parliament for Poole; 1850 – 1868; With: Sir George Philips to 1832; George Woodroffe Franklyn 1852–1859; Charles Waring from 1859 | Succeeded by Arthur Guest |
