= David Anderson (British politician) =

British Labour politician

Dave Anderson
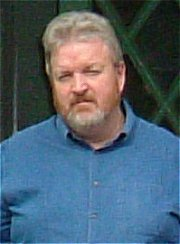
- Anderson in 2007

Shadow Secretary of State for Scotland
- In office 1 July 2016 – 14 June 2017
- Leader: Jeremy Corbyn
- Preceded by: Ian Murray
- Succeeded by: Lesley Laird

Shadow Secretary of State for Northern Ireland
- In office 27 June 2016 – 14 June 2017
- Leader: Jeremy Corbyn
- Preceded by: Vernon Coaker
- Succeeded by: Owen Smith

Member of Parliament for Blaydon
- In office 5 May 2005 – 3 May 2017
- Preceded by: John McWilliam
- Succeeded by: Liz Twist

Personal details
- Born: 2 December 1953 (age 72) Sunderland, England
- Party: Labour
- Spouse: Eva Anderson (m. 1973)
- Education: New College Durham; Doncaster College; Durham University
- Website: Official website Commons website

David Anderson (born 2 December 1953) is a British politician who served as Shadow Secretary of State for Northern Ireland and Shadow Secretary of State for Scotland from 2016 to 2017. A member of the Labour Party, he was Member of Parliament (MP) for Blaydon from 2005 to 2017.

== Early life ==
Anderson was born in Sunderland. He was educated at Maltby Grammar School, Durham Technical College, Doncaster Technical College and Durham University. He worked as a miner from 1969 until 1989 at Eppleton Colliery near Hetton-le-Hole, then as a care worker until he entered Parliament. During his time as a care worker, he was also an activist in the public sector trade union UNISON and served as its president from 2003 until 2004.

== Parliamentary career ==
Anderson was first elected at the 2005 general election, after the sitting Labour MP for Blaydon John McWilliam stood down.

In Parliament, Anderson was a member of the Northern Ireland Affairs Select Committee from 2005 onward, having long been interested in the peace process in Northern Ireland, and was also a member of the House of Commons Procedure Committee for a year. In 2006 he was appointed as the Parliamentary private secretary to the Education and Skills Minister Bill Rammell.

Until 2014, Anderson served as chair of the Labour Friends of Iraq group, a body dedicated to supporting ordinary Iraqis as they attempt to rebuild their lives. In a 2008 interview with SOMA Digest Anderson urged the implementation of Article 140 of the Constitution of Iraq regarding the normalisation process of Kirkuk and other formerly Arabised towns. He also called for solving the Kurdish issue in Turkey in a democratic way.

Anderson was nominated as the Parliamentary Champion for Education and Sport by the anti-racist group Show Racism the Red Card. He has been active in the campaign to overturn a House of Lords ruling that would have had a devastating impact on people suffering from asbestosis, pleural mesothelioma and peritoneal mesothelioma, all crippling diseases caused by exposure to asbestos.

Although Labour lost the 2010 general election, Anderson's majority in the Blaydon constituency rose from 5,335 in 2005 to 9,117, on a turnout of 44,913 (66.2%).

He was one of 16 signatories of an open letter to Ed Miliband in January 2015, calling on the party to commit to oppose further austerity, take rail franchises back into public ownership and strengthen collective bargaining arrangements.

He was appointed on 27 June 2016 as Shadow Secretary of State for Northern Ireland by Jeremy Corbyn, following resignations. On 1 July he was made Shadow Secretary of State for Scotland, replacing Ian Murray who had resigned five days earlier. With the snap general election in June 2017, Anderson decided not to seek re-election. Labour retained his seat at the election.

== Personal life ==
He married Eva Anderson in 1973.

Parliament of the United Kingdom
Preceded by John McWilliam	Member of Parliament for Blaydon; 2005–2017	Succeeded by Liz Twist
Political offices
Preceded by Vernon Coaker	Shadow Secretary of State for Northern Ireland; 2016–2017	Succeeded by Owen Smith
Preceded by Ian Murray	Shadow Secretary of State for Scotland; 2016–2017	Succeeded by Lesley Laird
Trade union offices
Preceded by Nancy Coull	President of Unison; 2003–2004	Succeeded by Pauline Thorne
