= Evelyn Ashley =

British barrister and Liberal politician

The Right Honourable Evelyn Ashley
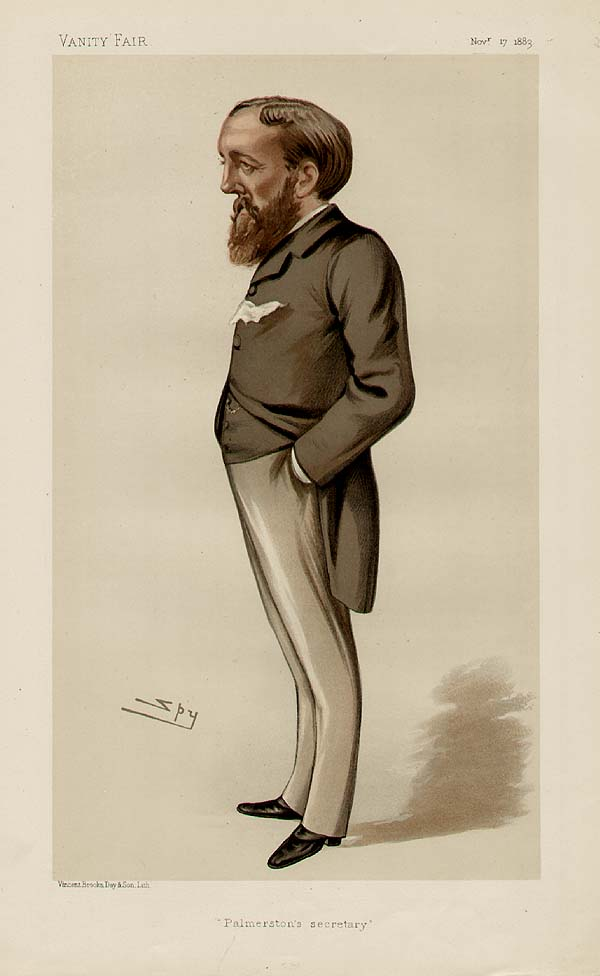
- "Palmerston's Secretary". Caricature by Spy published in Vanity Fair in 1883.

Under-Secretary of State for the Colonies
- In office 12 May 1882 – 9 June 1885
- Prime Minister: William Ewart Gladstone
- Preceded by: Leonard Courtney
- Succeeded by: The Earl of Dunraven

Parliamentary Secretary to the Board of Trade
- In office 29 April 1880 – 12 May 1882
- Prime Minister: William Ewart Gladstone
- Preceded by: John Gilbert Talbot
- Succeeded by: John Holms

Member of Parliament
- In office 26 May 1874 – 7 November 1885
- Preceded by: Charles Waring
- Succeeded by: Charles Schreiber

Personal details
- Born: 24 July 1836
- Died: 16 November 1907 (aged 71)
- Party: Liberal
- Spouse(s): Sybella Charlotte Farquhar (m. 1866; died 1886) Lady Alice Cole (m. 1891)
- Children: 3
- Parent(s): Anthony Ashley-Cooper, 7th Earl of Shaftesbury; Lady Emily Cowper
- Education: Trinity College, Cambridge

Anthony Evelyn Melbourne Ashley PC (24 July 1836 – 16 November 1907) was a British barrister and Liberal politician. He was private secretary to Lord Palmerston and later published a biography of him. After entering Parliament at a by-election in 1864, Ashley served under William Ewart Gladstone as Parliamentary Secretary to the Board of Trade from 1880 to 1882 and as Under-Secretary of State for the Colonies from 1882 to 1885.

== Background and education ==
Ashley was the third child and second son of Anthony Ashley-Cooper, 7th Earl of Shaftesbury and Lady Emily Cowper, eldest daughter of Peter Cowper, 5th Earl Cowper and sister of William Cowper-Temple, 1st Baron Mount Temple. He was educated at Harrow and Trinity College, Cambridge.

On William Cowper-Temple's death in 1888, he inherited a 10,000 acre estate on the Mullaghmore Peninsula in Sligo, around Classiebawn Castle. He would spend part of every year there.

== Legal and political career ==
Ashley was private secretary to Lord Palmerston from 1858 to 1865 and worked as a barrister on the Oxford Circuit from 1865 to 1874. He sat as Liberal Member of Parliament for Poole from 1874 to 1880 and for Isle of Wight from 1880 to 1885 and served under William Ewart Gladstone as Parliamentary Secretary to the Board of Trade from 1880 to 1882 and as Under-Secretary of State for the Colonies from 1882 to 1885. He was also an Ecclesiastical and Church Estates Commissioner from 1880 to 1885, a Verderer of the New Forest and High Sheriff of Sligo in 1889. In 1891 he was sworn of the Privy Council. His publications include the Life of Lord Palmerston.

He later stood unsuccessfully for the Liberal Unionist Party in the Glasgow Bridgeton by-election in 1887 and 1888 Ayr Burghs by-election

== Family ==
On 28 July 1866, Ashley married Sybella Charlotte Farquhar, daughter of Sir Walter Farquhar, 3rd Baronet. They had two children:

- Wilfrid William Ashley, later Baron Mount Temple (1867–1939), who married Amalia Mary Maud Cassel, daughter and only child of financier Sir Ernest Cassel. After his first wife's death in 1911, he married in 1914 Muriel Emily ("Molly") Forbes-Sempill, the former wife of Rear-Admiral The Hon. Arthur Forbes-Sempill, daughter of The Rev. Walter Spencer of Fownhope Court, Herefordshire, and sister of Margery Greenwood, Viscountess Greenwood.
- Lillian Blanche Georgiana Ashley (1875–1939), who married Hercules Pakenham.

Following Sybella's death on 31 August 1886, he married Lady Alice Cole, daughter of William Cole, 3rd Earl of Enniskillen on 30 June 1891. They had one son:

- Anthony Henry Evelyn Ashley (1895–1921), who was educated at Harrow, Magdalen College and a Captain 2nd Battalion Coldstream Guards; he died of wounds received in action in 1916.

Ashley died in November 1907, aged 71. Lady Alice Ashley died on 25 August 1931.

Parliament of the United Kingdom
Preceded by Charles Waring	Member of Parliament for Poole; 1874–1880	Succeeded by Charles Schreiber
Preceded by Alexander Baillie-Cochrane	Member of Parliament for Isle of Wight; 1880–1885	Succeeded by Sir Richard Webster
Political offices
Preceded by John Gilbert Talbot	Parliamentary Secretary to the Board of Trade; 1881–1882	Succeeded by John Holms
Preceded by Leonard Courtney	Under-Secretary of State for the Colonies; 1882–1885	Succeeded by The Earl of Dunraven
Church of England titles
Preceded by Thomas Salt	Second Church Estates Commissioner; 1880–1885	Succeeded by Sir Henry Selwin-Ibbetson
