= 1907 Banffshire by-election =

UK parliamentary by-election

The 1907 Banffshire by-election was a Parliamentary by-election held on 16 February 1907. The constituency returned one Member of Parliament (MP) to the House of Commons of the United Kingdom, elected by the first past the post voting system.

== Vacancy ==
The by-election was held due to the death of the incumbent Liberal MP, Alexander William Black on 29 December 1906. He died from injuries received in the Elliot Junction rail accident, forcing a by-election early in 1907.

== Electoral history ==
Black had been Liberal MP for the seat of Banffshire since the 1900 General Election. The seat had been Liberal since they gained it in 1837. They had easily held the seat at the last election, with an increased majority;

Alexander Black

General Election 1906: Banffshire
Party	Candidate	Votes	%	±%
Liberal	Alexander William Black	4,101	68.3	+15.5
Conservative	James Augustus Grant	1,901	31.7	−15.5
Majority		2,200	36.6	+31.0
Turnout		6,002	73.9	+9.7
Liberal hold		Swing	+15.5	

== Candidates ==
The local Liberal Association selected 31-year-old Walter Waring to defend the seat. Waring was the son of Charles Waring, former Liberal Member of Parliament for Poole. He was unsuccessful Liberal candidate in Wigtownshire in the 1906 general election. The Conservatives chose 39-year-old William Whitelaw as their candidate. Whitelaw was elected at the 1892 general election as the Member of Parliament (MP) for Perth, but lost his seat at the 1895 general election and was defeated when he stood again in 1900. He was a director of the Highland Railway (HR) since 1898, and Chairman of the HR since 1902.

== Campaign ==
Polling Day was fixed for 16 February 1907.

== Result ==
The Liberals held the seat with a slightly reduced majority;

Walter Waring

1907 Banffshire by-election
Party	Candidate	Votes	%	±%
Liberal	Walter Waring	3,901	67.3	−1.0
Conservative	William Whitelaw	1,892	32.7	+1.0
Majority		2,009	34.6	−2.0
Turnout		5,793	70.8	−3.1
Liberal hold		Swing	-1.0	

The Liberal vote share of 67.3%, though less than in 1906, was higher than any other Liberal vote share since before 1885.

== Aftermath ==
Waring was re-elected at the following general election against a new Conservative opponent;

General Election Jan 1910: Banffshire
Party	Candidate	Votes	%	±%
Liberal	Walter Waring	4,066	66.4	−1.9
Conservative	James Crabb Watt	2,053	33.6	+1.9
Majority		2,013	32.8	−3.8
Turnout		6,119	74.8	+0.9
Liberal hold		Swing	-1.9	

Whitelaw did not stand for parliament again.
