= Robert Woof (politician) =

British coal miner, trade unionist and Labour Party politician

Robert Edward Woof (24 November 1911 – 27 November 1997) was a British coal miner, trade unionist, and Labour Party politician from Chopwell in County Durham. He sat in the House of Commons from 1956 to 1979 as the Member of Parliament (MP) for Blaydon.

Woof was born into a mining family, although his great-grandfather had been a cabin boy on Nelson's HMS Victory. He was educated at a Durham County school, and left school to start work on his 14th birthday in Chopwell Colliery where he became a coal face worker, and also an officer of the National Union of Mineworkers (NUM) for 15 years, serving as treasurer of his local NUM branch from 1943. He was also a member of Durham County Council from 1947 to 1956.

He was first elected to the House of Commons in a by-election in February 1956, following the death of the sitting MP, Labour's William Whiteley. He held the seat at the next six general elections, before stepping down from Parliament at the 1979 general election.

In 1973, he and fellow Labour MP Tom Urwin were awarded costs and damages after being libelled by The Journal newspaper.

Parliament of the United Kingdom
Preceded by William Whiteley	Member of Parliament for Blaydon; 1956–1979	Succeeded by John McWilliam
