= Scaldwell =

Village in Northamptonshire, England

Coordinates: 52.3452°N 0.8784°W

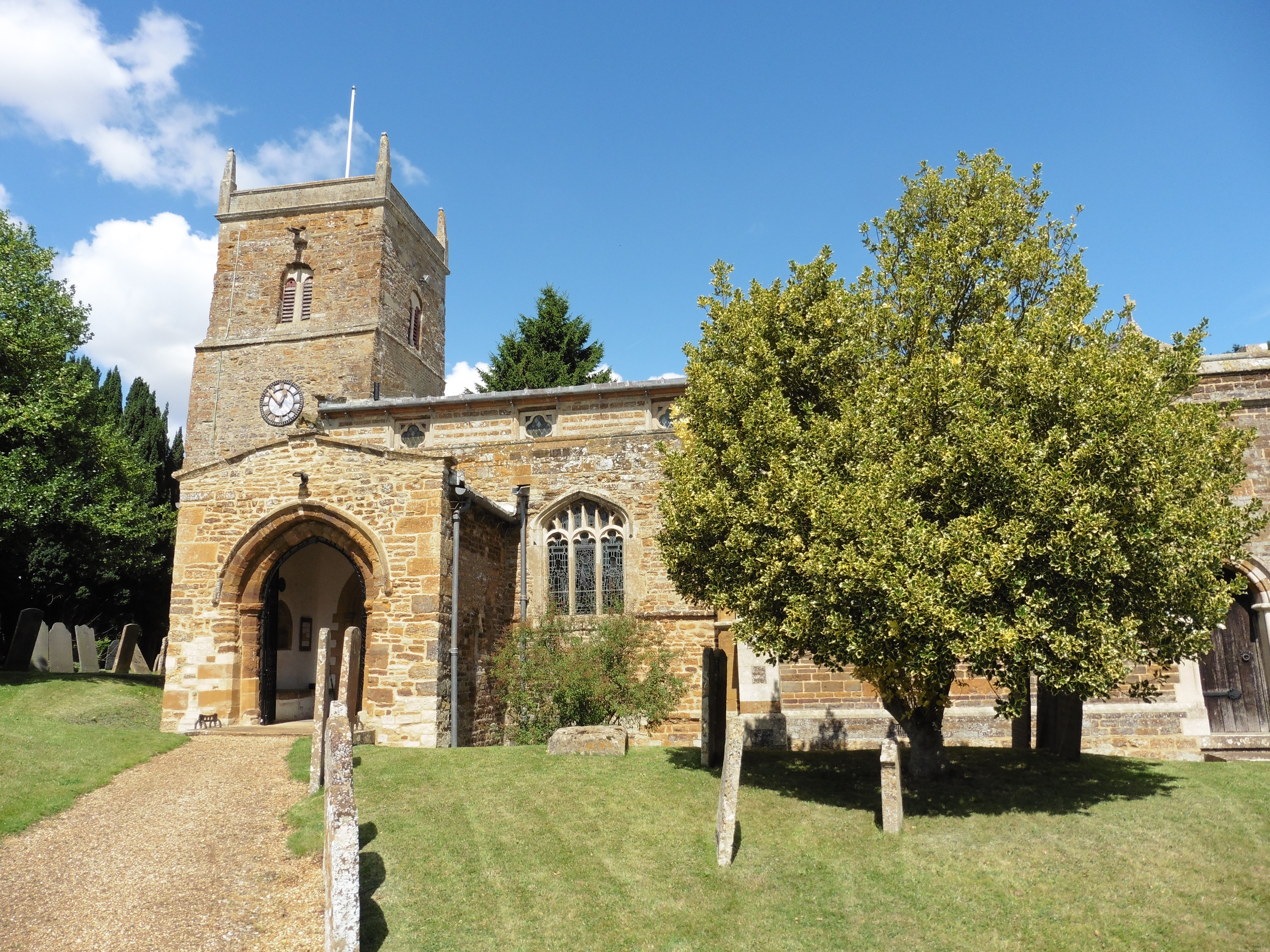
- Church of St Peter and St Paul

- Location within Northamptonshire
- Population: 302 (2011)
- OS grid reference: SP7672
- Unitary authority: West Northamptonshire
- Ceremonial county: Northamptonshire
- Region: East Midlands
- Country: England
- Sovereign state: United Kingdom
- Post town: Northampton
- Postcode district: NN6
- Dialling code: 01604
- Police: Northamptonshire
- Fire: Northamptonshire
- Ambulance: East Midlands
- UK Parliament: Kettering

Scaldwell is a village and civil parish in West Northamptonshire, England.

The village's name means 'spring/stream which is shallow'.

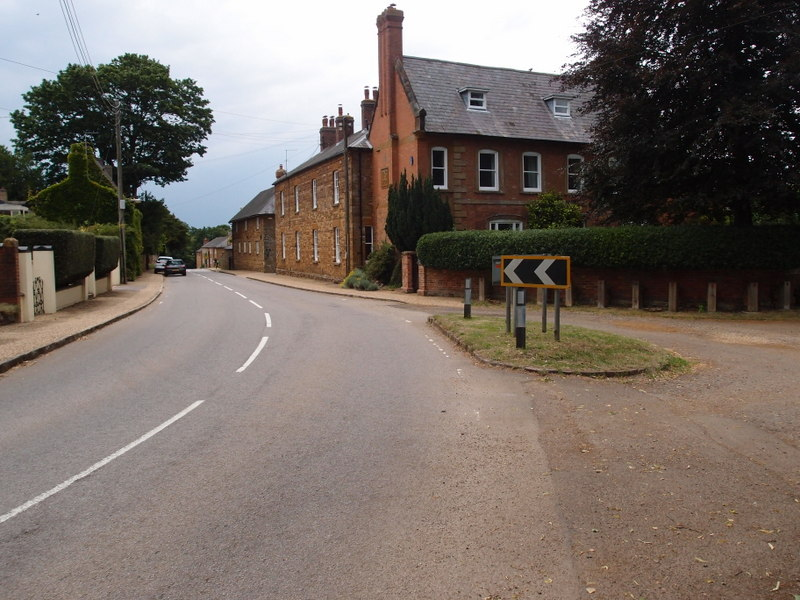
Road junction

At the time of the 2001 census, the parish had a population of 271 living in 113 households, increasing to 302 in 2011 and 304 in 2020. It has an ageing population. Scaldwell lacks any shops or pubs. The nearest place for a school, shop or pub is Brixworth. Scaldwell has a church dedicated to Saints Peter and Paul.It has a Norman tower and some 13th century-features and was restored in 1863.

The village has a traditional green and was mentioned in the Domesday Book.

== Ironstone quarrying and the Scaldwell Tramway ==
The Staveley Coal and Iron Company operated a number of ironstone quarries around the villages of Brixworth, Hanging Houghton and Scaldwell from 1912 until 1963. The first pits lay to the east of the Scaldwell to Brixworth Road close to Scaldwell, and began producing ore in April 1913.

Two separate 3 ft (914 mm) gauge tramways transported ore from the quarries, one serving the Hanging Houghton pits. The second, longer tramway ran from pits east of Scaldwell to a depot north of the village. An aerial ropeway connected the two tramways to sidings on the Market Harborough to Northampton railway line. The pits were originally hand-worked, but in 1933 steam dragline excavators were introduced, which made the quarrying faster and more efficient.

In 1914, new pits were opened near Grange Farm, a mile south of Scaldwell and the Scaldwell tramway was extended to serve them. New ore fields were leased south of Brixworth in 1939 and the tramway was further extended to reach them. The Brixworth pits continued in production until 1949 when they were abandoned and the tramway extension removed.

During the Second World War, a new standard gauge branch line was laid to the Hanging Houghton quarries. Ore from those quarries was no longer carried by the aerial ropeway. The branch was extended to Scaldwell in 1954, and the aerial ropeway was abandoned. Ore was tipped from narrow to standard gauge wagons at Scaldwell. The final ironstone pits in use were a mile and a half southeast of Scaldwell at New Grange Farm. These ceased working in December 1962 and the entire system was abandoned. The narrow-gauge tramway and standard-gauge branch were removed by 1964, and the remaining pits were landscaped and returned to agricultural use.

The final ironstone quarrying near Scaldwell was in the northern pit close to Lamport village. Diesel and electric quarrying machines were used and it was served by the standard-gauge tramway. It closed in 1963.

The narrow-gauge tramways used steam locomotives throughout the time they operated. The Peckett locomotive Scaldwell was purchased by the Narrow Gauge Railway Society when the tramway closed and moved to the Brockham Railway Museum for preservation.

== Notable people ==
- Edward Hume (1841–1921), cricketer
