= George Woodroffe Franklyn =

English politician (1800–1870)

Member of Parliament for Poole
- In office 8 July 1852 – 12 July 1865 Serving with Henry Danby Seymour
- Preceded by: Henry Danby Seymour; George Philips
- Succeeded by: Henry Danby Seymour; Charles Waring

Personal details
- Born: 1800
- Died: 5 November 1870 (aged 70)
- Party: Conservative

George Woodroffe Franklyn (1800 – 5 November 1870) was a British Conservative politician.

Franklyn had at least two brothers, John, who died in 1879, and James. He also had four daughters; the eldest, Alice Mary, married in 1857 to Captain John Sanderson R.N., while the second born, Agatha Ellen, married in 1863. Franklyn also had at least one son, George Arden, by wife Mary June, who died in Meerut, Bengal in 1852 at the age of 23.

Franklyn served as the "chief magistrate", or mayor, of Bristol from 1841 to 1842. His brother, James Norroway Franklyn, held the office from 1839 to 1840.

Franklyn was first elected Conservative MP for Poole in 1852 and held the seat until 1865, when he did not seek re-election.

In 1854, Franklyn was almost killed but narrowly escaped injury by cannon-fire set off near the Forest-hill railway station, Sydenham.

In 1855, Franklyn served as president of The Gloucestershire Society, a charitable organization established in 1657.

Franklyn died at his home on 5 November 1870 in Lovelhill, Windsor Forest. His will indicated a net worth under £80,000. At the time of his death, Franklyn was noted as having the title of Deputy-Lieutenant for Middlesex, an honor he appears to have garnered in 1855. Also at the time of his death, Franklyn was a partner in the snuff and tobacco manufacturer Franklyn, Davey and Morgan.

Parliament of the United Kingdom
Preceded by Henry Danby Seymour; George Philips	Member of Parliament for Poole; 1852–1865; With: Henry Danby Seymour	Succeeded by Henry Danby Seymour; Charles Waring
