= Banffshire (UK Parliament constituency) =

Parliamentary constituency in the United Kingdom, 1801–1983

- Former county constituency for the House of Commons
- Subdivision: Banffshire

1708–1983
- Seats: One
- Created from: Banffshire
- Replaced by: Moray; Banff & Buchan

Banffshire was a constituency of the House of Commons of Great Britain from 1708 to 1800, and of the House of Commons of the Parliament of the United Kingdom from 1801 to 1983. It elected one Member of Parliament (MP), using the first-past-the-post voting system.

== Creation ==
The British parliamentary constituency was created in 1708 following the Acts of Union, 1707 and replaced the former Parliament of Scotland shire constituency of Banffshire.

== History ==
The constituency elected one Member of Parliament (MP) by the first past the post system until 1983 when it was split and merged into Moray and Banff and Buchan.

The constituency covered the county of Banffshire, Scotland, but until 1918 the county town of Banff and the burgh of Cullen were represented as part of Elgin Burghs.

== Members of Parliament ==
Election	Member	Party	Notes
1707	John Murray		
1708	Alexander Abercromby		
1727	William Duff		later 1st Earl Fife
1734	James Abercromby		
1754	James Duff,		later 2nd Earl Fife
1784	Sir James Duff		
1789 by-election	James Ferguson	Tory	
1790	Sir James Grant, Bt	Tory	
1795 by-election	David McDowall-Grant		
1796	Sir William Grant	Whig	
1812	Robert Abercromby		
1818	James Duff	Whig	
1827 by-election	John Morison	Tory	
1832	George Ferguson	Tory	
1834	George Ferguson	Conservative	
1837	James Duff	Whig	later 5th Earl Fife
1857 by-election	Lachlan Gordon-Duff	Whig	
1859	Lachlan Gordon-Duff	Liberal	
1861 by-election	Robert Duff	Liberal	
1893 by-election	Sir William Wedderburn	Liberal	
1900	Alexander William Black	Liberal	
1907 by-election	Walter Waring	Liberal	
1916	Walter Waring	Coalition Liberal	Contested Blaydon following redistribution
1918	Charles Barrie	Liberal	Member for Elgin Burghs (Oct–Dec 1918), later Baron Abertay
1924	William Templeton	Unionist	
1929	Sir Murdoch McKenzie Wood	Liberal	
1935	Sir Edmund Findlay	Unionist	
1945	Sir William Duthie	Unionist	
1964	Wilfred Baker	Conservative	
Feb 1974	Hamish Watt	SNP	
1979	David Myles	Conservative	Contested Orkney and Shetland following redistribution
1983	constituency abolished: see Banff & Buchan and Moray		

== Election results ==
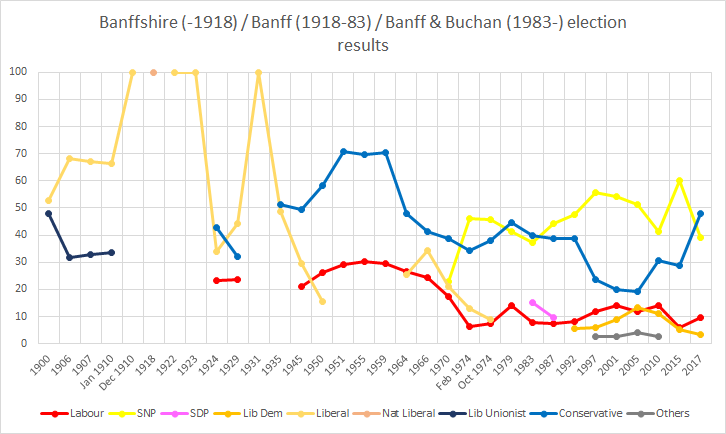
Banff election results

Decades:	1840s; 1850s; 1860s; 1870s; 1880s; 1890s; 1900s; 1910s; 1920s; 1930s; 1940s; 1950s; 1960s; 1970s

=== Elections in the 1830s ===
General election 1830: Banffshire
Party	Candidate	Votes	%
Tory	John Morison	Unopposed	
Registered electors		49	
Tory gain from Whig			

General election 1831: Banffshire
Party	Candidate	Votes	%
Tory	John Morison	20	60.6
Tory	George Ferguson	13	39.4
Majority		7	21.2
Turnout		33	c. 67.3
Registered electors		c. 49	
Tory hold			

General election 1832: Banffshire
Party	Candidate	Votes	%	±%
Tory	George Ferguson	295	69.7	−30.3
Whig	Thomas Gordon	128	30.3	New
Majority		167	39.4	+18.2
Turnout		423	84.9	c. +17.6
Registered electors		498		
Tory hold		Swing	+30.3	

General election 1835: Banffshire
Party	Candidate	Votes	%
Conservative	George Ferguson	Unopposed	
Registered electors		525	
Conservative hold			

General election 1837: Banffshire
Party	Candidate	Votes	%
Whig	James Duff	292	57.7
Conservative	George Ferguson	214	42.3
Majority		78	15.4
Turnout		506	73.9
Registered electors		685	
Whig gain from Conservative			

=== Elections in the 1840s ===
General election 1841: Banffshire
Party	Candidate	Votes	%	±%
Whig	James Duff	316	53.7	−4.0
Conservative	John Ogilvy-Grant	273	46.3	+4.0
Majority		43	7.4	−8.0
Turnout		589	82.1	+8.2
Registered electors		717		
Whig hold		Swing	−4.0	

General election 1847: Banffshire
Party	Candidate	Votes	%	±%
Whig	James Duff	Unopposed		
Registered electors		833		
Whig hold				

=== Elections in the 1850s ===
General election 1852: Banffshire
Party	Candidate	Votes	%	±%
Whig	James Duff	327	52.1	N/A
Conservative	Hay Macdowall-Grant	301	47.9	New
Majority		26	4.2	N/A
Turnout		628	77.2	N/A
Registered electors		813		
Whig hold		Swing	N/A	

General election 1857: Banffshire
Party	Candidate	Votes	%	±%
Whig	James Duff	Unopposed		
Registered electors		927		
Whig hold				

Duff resigned by accepting the office of Steward of the Manor of Hempholme, causing a by-election.

By-election, 30 June 1857: Banffshire
Party	Candidate	Votes	%	±%
Whig	Lachlan Gordon	Unopposed		
Whig hold				

General election 1859: Banffshire
Party	Candidate	Votes	%	±%
Liberal	Lachlan Gordon-Duff	Unopposed		
Registered electors		905		
Liberal hold				

Back to Election results

=== Elections in the 1860s ===
Duff's resignation caused a by-election.

By-election, 1 May 1861: Banffshire
Party	Candidate	Votes	%	±%
Liberal	Robert Duff	Unopposed		
Liberal hold				

General election 1865: Banffshire
Party	Candidate	Votes	%	±%
Liberal	Robert Duff	Unopposed		
Registered electors		1,062		
Liberal hold				

General election 1868: Banffshire
Party	Candidate	Votes	%	±%
Liberal	Robert Duff	Unopposed		
Registered electors		2,291		
Liberal hold				

Back to Election results

=== Elections in the 1870s ===
General election 1874: Banffshire
Party	Candidate	Votes	%	±%
Liberal	Robert Duff	Unopposed		
Registered electors		2,418		
Liberal hold				

Back to Election results

=== Elections in the 1880s ===
General election 1880: Banffshire
Party	Candidate	Votes	%	±%
Liberal	Robert Duff	Unopposed		
Registered electors		2,649		
Liberal hold				

Duff was appointed a Lord Commissioner of the Treasury, requiring a by-election.

By-election, 19 Jun 1882: Banffshire
Party	Candidate	Votes	%	±%
Liberal	Robert Duff	Unopposed		
Registered electors		2,649		
Liberal hold				

General election 1885: Banffshire
Party	Candidate	Votes	%	±%
Liberal	Robert Duff	3,740	65.1	N/A
Conservative	Moir Stormonth-Darling	2,008	34.9	New
Majority		1,732	30.2	N/A
Turnout		5,748	81.9	N/A
Registered electors		7,018		
Liberal hold		Swing	N/A	

Duff was appointed Civil Lord of the Admiralty, requiring a by-election.

By-election, 13 Feb 1886: Banffshire
Party	Candidate	Votes	%	±%
Liberal	Robert Duff	Unopposed		
Liberal hold				

General election 1886: Banffshire
Party	Candidate	Votes	%	±%
Liberal	Robert Duff	2,583	64.9	−0.2
Liberal Unionist	Charles Grant	1,394	35.1	+0.2
Majority		1,189	29.8	−0.4
Turnout		3,977	56.7	−25.2
Registered electors		7,018		
Liberal hold		Swing	−0.2	

Back to Election results

=== Elections in the 1890s ===
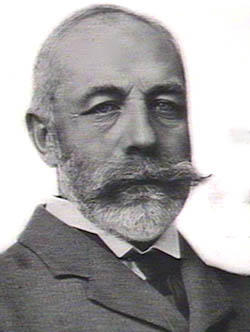
Robert Duff

General election 1892: Banffshire
Party	Candidate	Votes	%	±%
Liberal	Robert Duff	2,293	61.7	−3.2
Ind. Conservative	Maltman Barry	1,424	38.3	New
Majority		869	23.4	−6.4
Turnout		3,717	51.7	−5.0
Registered electors		7,185		
Liberal hold		Swing	−3.2	

W. Wedderburn

1893 Banffshire by-election
Party	Candidate	Votes	%	±%
Liberal	William Wedderburn	3,166	56.9	−4.8
Conservative	James Grant	2,395	43.1	New
Majority		771	13.8	−9.6
Turnout		5,561	76.8	+25.1
Registered electors		7,241		
Liberal hold		Swing	−4.8	

General election 1895: Banffshire
Party	Candidate	Votes	%	±%
Liberal	William Wedderburn	2,977	54.7	−7.0
Conservative	James Grant	2,467	45.3	N/A
Majority		510	9.4	−14.0
Turnout		5,444	72.4	+20.7
Registered electors		7,520		
Liberal hold		Swing	−7.0	

Back to Election results

=== Elections in the 1900s ===
Alexander Black

General election 1900: Banffshire
Party	Candidate	Votes	%	±%
Liberal	Alexander William Black	2,768	52.8	−1.9
Liberal Unionist	George Watt (1854–1940)	2,470	47.2	+1.9
Majority		298	5.6	−3.8
Turnout		5,238	64.2	−8.2
Registered electors		8,156		
Liberal hold		Swing	−1.9	

General election 1906: Banffshire
Party	Candidate	Votes	%	±%
Liberal	Alexander William Black	4,101	68.3	+15.5
Conservative	James Grant	1,901	31.7	−15.5
Majority		2,200	36.6	+31.0
Turnout		6,002	73.9	+9.7
Registered electors		8,118		
Liberal hold		Swing	+15.5	

Walter Waring

1907 Banffshire by-election
Party	Candidate	Votes	%	±%
Liberal	Walter Waring	3,901	67.3	−1.0
Conservative	William Whitelaw	1,892	32.7	+1.0
Majority		2,009	34.6	−2.0
Turnout		5,793	70.8	−3.1
Registered electors		8,179		
Liberal hold		Swing	−1.0	

Back to Election results

=== Elections in the 1910s ===
General election January 1910: Banffshire
Party	Candidate	Votes	%	±%
Liberal	Walter Waring	4,066	66.4	−1.9
Conservative	James Crabb Watt	2,053	33.6	+1.9
Majority		2,013	32.8	−3.8
Turnout		6,119	74.8	+0.9
Registered electors		8,181		
Liberal hold		Swing	−1.9	

General election December 1910: Banffshire
Party	Candidate	Votes	%	±%
Liberal	Walter Waring	Unopposed		
Liberal hold				

General Election 1914–15:

Another General Election was required to take place before the end of 1915. The political parties had been making preparations for an election to take place and by July 1914, the following candidates had been selected;

- Liberal: Walter Waring
- Unionist: Edward Archibald Hume

Charles Barrie

General election 1918: Banffshire
Party		Candidate	Votes	%
C	Liberal	Charles Barrie	Unopposed	
	Liberal win (new boundaries)			
C indicates candidate endorsed by the coalition government.

Back to Election results

=== Elections in the 1920s ===
General election 1922: Banffshire
Party	Candidate	Votes	%	±%
Liberal	Charles Barrie	Unopposed		
Liberal hold				

General election 1923: Banffshire
Party	Candidate	Votes	%	±%
Liberal	Charles Barrie	Unopposed		
Liberal hold				

General election 1924: Banffshire
Party	Candidate	Votes	%	±%
Unionist	William Templeton	6,829	42.7	New
Liberal	Charles Barrie	5,426	34.0	N/A
Labour	A W Groundwater	3,722	23.3	New
Majority		403	8.7	N/A
Turnout		15,977		N/A
Unionist gain from Liberal		Swing	N/A	

General election 1929: Banffshire
Party	Candidate	Votes	%	±%
Liberal	Murdoch McKenzie Wood	9,278	44.3	+10.3
Unionist	William Templeton	6,720	32.0	−10.7
Labour	Alasdair Alpin MacGregor	4,982	23.7	+0.4
Majority		2,558	12.3	N/A
Turnout		20,980		
Liberal gain from Unionist		Swing	+10.5	

Back to Election results

=== Elections in the 1930s ===
General election 1931: Banffshire
Party	Candidate	Votes	%	±%
Liberal	Murdoch McKenzie Wood	Unopposed	N/A	N/A
Liberal hold				

General election 1935: Banffshire
Party	Candidate	Votes	%	±%
Unionist	Edmund Findlay	11,771	51.3	New
Liberal	Murdoch McKenzie Wood	11,168	48.7	N/A
Majority		603	2.6	N/A
Turnout		22,939	70.5	N/A
Unionist gain from Liberal		Swing	N/A	

General Election 1939–40

Another General Election was required to take place before the end of 1940. The political parties had been making preparations for an election to take place and by the Autumn of 1939, the following candidates had been selected;

- Unionist: William Lindsay
- Liberal: Murdoch McKenzie Wood
- Labour: George A Mair

Back to Election results

=== Elections in the 1940s ===
General election 1945: Banffshire
Party	Candidate	Votes	%	±%
Unionist	William Duthie	10,689	49.45	
Liberal	Ian Alistair Duncan Millar	6,401	29.62	
Labour	D. Macpherson	4,524	20.93	New
Majority		4,288	19.83	
Turnout		21,614		
Unionist hold		Swing		

Back to Election results

=== Elections in the 1950s ===
General election 1950: Banffshire
Party	Candidate	Votes	%	±%
Unionist	William Duthie	13,952	58.15	
Labour	J. Brown	6,303	26.27	
Liberal	Gordon Lethem	3,739	15.58	
Majority		7,649	31.88	
Turnout		23,994		
Unionist hold		Swing		

General election 1951: Banffshire
Party	Candidate	Votes	%	±%
Unionist	William Duthie	16,562	70.87	
Labour	Alexander Flett	6,806	29.13	
Majority		9,756	41.74	
Turnout		23,368		
Unionist hold		Swing		

General election 1955: Banffshire
Party	Candidate	Votes	%	±%
Unionist	William Duthie	14,643	69.80	
Labour	William Paterson	6,337	30.20	
Majority		8,306	39.60	
Turnout		20,980		
Unionist hold		Swing		

General election 1959: Banffshire
Party	Candidate	Votes	%	±%
Unionist	William Duthie	14,359	70.56	
Labour	Robert W. Irvine	5,992	29.44	
Majority		8,367	41.12	
Turnout		20,351		
Unionist hold		Swing		

Back to Election results

=== Elections in the 1960s ===
General election 1964: Banffshire
Party	Candidate	Votes	%	±%
Conservative	Wilfred Baker	9,995	47.77	
Labour	Henry Dickson	5,574	26.64	
Liberal	Thomas Alexander Macnair	5,354	25.59	New
Majority		4,421	21.13	
Turnout		20,923		
Conservative hold		Swing		

General election 1966: Banffshire
Party	Candidate	Votes	%	±%
Conservative	Wilfred Baker	8,139	41.4	−6.4
Liberal	Basil Wishart	6,762	34.4	+8.8
Labour	Robert Middleton	4,775	24.3	−2.3
Majority		1,377	7.0	−14.1
Turnout		19,676		
Conservative hold		Swing		

Back to Election results

=== Elections in the 1970s ===
General election 1970: Banffshire
Party	Candidate	Votes	%	±%
Conservative	Wilfred Baker	8,457	38.7	−2.7
SNP	Hamish Watt	5,006	22.9	New
Liberal	Ronnie Fraser	4,589	21.0	−13.4
Labour	Andrew F. Walls	3,795	17.4	−6.9
Majority		3,451	15.8	+7.8
Turnout		21,847		
Conservative hold		Swing		

General election February 1974: Banffshire
Party	Candidate	Votes	%	±%
SNP	Hamish Watt	11,037	46.1	+23.2
Conservative	Wilfred Baker	8,252	34.5	−4.2
Liberal	Ronnie Fraser	3,121	13.0	−8.0
Labour	R. Dool	1,528	6.4	−11.0
Majority		2,785	11.6	N/A
Turnout		23,938	75.7	
SNP gain from Conservative		Swing	+13.7	

General election October 1974: Banffshire
Party	Candidate	Votes	%	±%
SNP	Hamish Watt	10,638	45.9	−0.2
Conservative	J.S. Gordon	8,797	37.9	+3.4
Liberal	C. McLeod	2,059	8.9	−4.1
Labour	A.W.M. Porteous	1,700	7.3	+0.9
Majority		1,851	8.0	−3.6
Turnout		23,194	72.5	−3.2
SNP hold		Swing	−1.8	

General election 1979: Banffshire
Party	Candidate	Votes	%	±%
Conservative	David Fairlie Myles	10,580	44.6	+6.7
SNP	Hamish Watt	9,781	41.2	−4.7
Labour	Robert E. Duncan	3,381	14.2	+6.9
Majority		799	3.4	N/A
Turnout		23,742	72.4	−0.1
Conservative gain from SNP		Swing	+5.7	

Back to Top
