= Robert Duff (British politician) =

British politician

The Right Honourable Sir Robert Duff GCMG
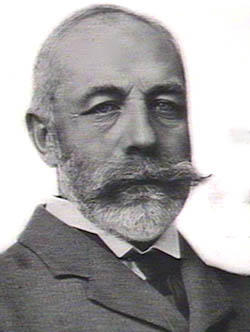
- Robert Duff

18th Governor of New South Wales
- In office 29 May 1893 – 15 March 1895
- Monarch: Victoria
- Preceded by: The Earl of Jersey
- Succeeded by: The Viscount Hampden

Personal details
- Born: Robert William Abercromby; 8 May 1835 Fetteresso Castle, Stonehaven, Kincardineshire, Scotland
- Died: 15 March 1895 (aged 59) Government House, Sydney, Colony of New South Wales, British Empire

Sir Robert William Duff GCMG PC (8 May 1835 – 15 March 1895), known as Robert William Duff Abercromby until 1862, was a Scottish Liberal Party politician who sat in the House of Commons from 1861 to 1893 and was Governor of New South Wales from 1893 to 1895.

== Early life ==
Duff was born at Fetteresso Castle, Stonehaven, Kincardineshire, son of Arthur Duff (grandson of Robert Duff) and his wife Elizabeth Innes, daughter of John Innes of Kincardine. He was educated at Blackheath School, London. He entered the Royal Navy in 1848, and was made a commander in 1865.

== Political career ==
Duff served as Liberal Member of Parliament (MP) for Banffshire from 1861 to 1893. He joined Robert Lowe as one of the Adullamites opposing the parliamentary Reform Bill of 1866, which led to the Reform Act 1867. He was a junior Lord of the Treasury and Liberal whip from 1882 to 1885, and Civil Lord of the Admiralty in 1886. He was appointed a Privy Counsellor in 1892.

== Governor of New South Wales ==
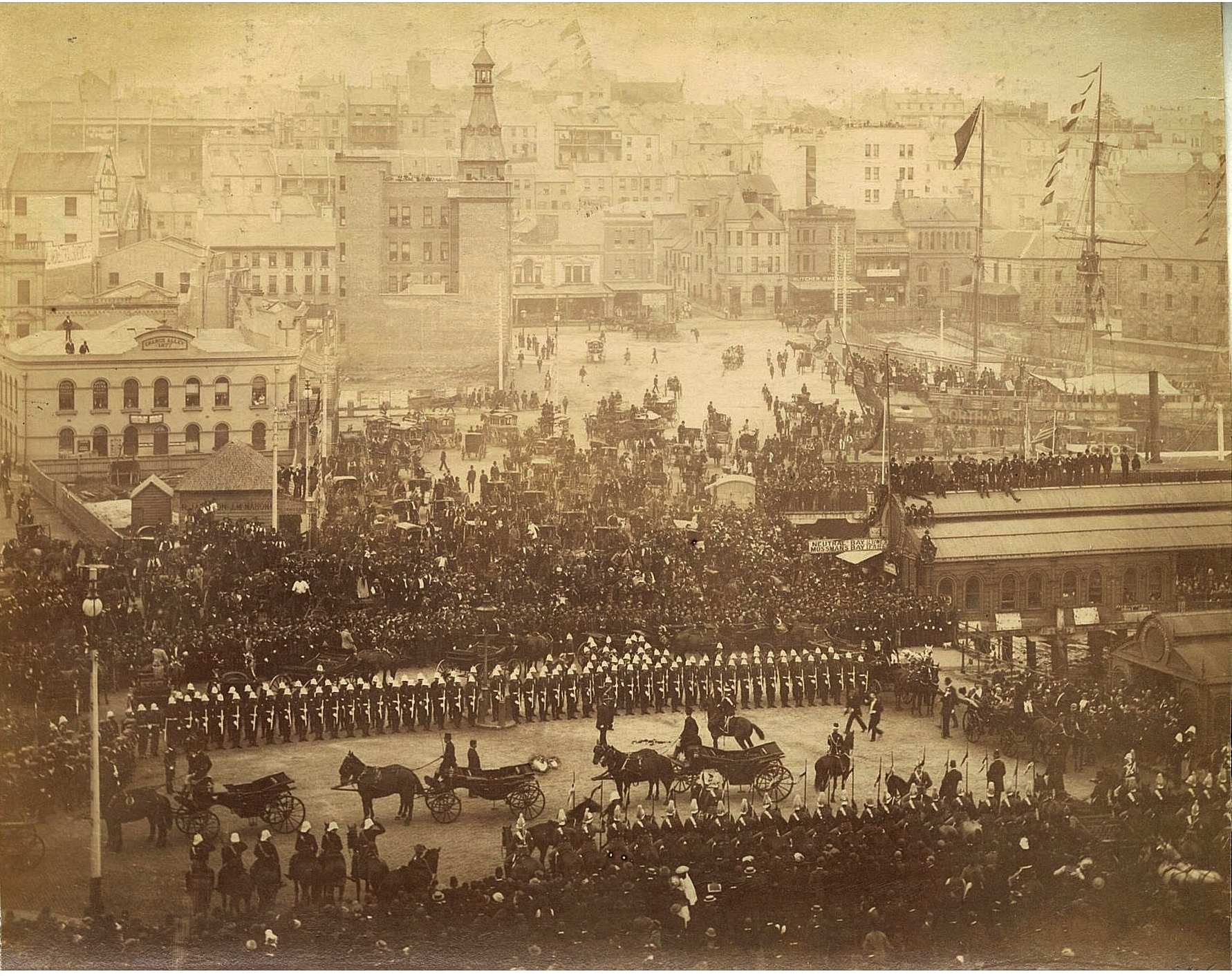
Arrival of Governor Sir Robert Duff, Circular Quay, Sydney, June 1893

Duff was appointed Governor of New South Wales in March 1893 and was subsequently awarded the GCMG. He reached Sydney to take up his duties on 29 May 1893.

His term of office was chiefly marked by his permitting the premier, Sir George Dibbs, to obtain the prorogation of parliament on 8 December 1893, after that minister had incurred a vote of censure. In July 1894, after his ministry had failed to carry the general election, Dibbs desired Duff to nominate several persons to the legislative council on his recommendation. Duff declined to accede to his wish on the ground that the ministry had been condemned by the colony, and in consequence, Dibbs and his colleagues resigned.

In February 1895, he became ill while visiting Hobart and returned to Government House in Sydney, where he died of multiple liver abscesses and sepsis on 15 March, shortly before his 60th birthday. He was interred in Waverley Cemetery.

=== Freemasonry ===
He was a Freemason. During his term as governor (1893-1895), he was also Grand Master of the Grand Lodge of New South Wales.

== Family ==
On 21 February 1871, Duff married Louisa, youngest daughter of Sir William Scott, ninth bart. of Ancrum in Roxburghshire. By her, he had three sons, the eldest Robert William, and four daughters.

Parliament of the United Kingdom
Preceded by Lachlan Duff Gordon-Duff	Member of Parliament for Banffshire; 1861–1893	Succeeded by Sir William Wedderburn
Political offices
Preceded by The Earl of Jersey	Governor of New South Wales; 1893–1895	Succeeded by The Viscount Hampden
