= Walter Waring (Liberal politician) =

British politician (1876–1930)

Walter Waring JP DL

Member of Parliament for Berwick and Haddington
- In office 15 November 1922 – 6 December 1923
- Preceded by: John Hope
- Succeeded by: Robert Spence

Member of Parliament for Blaydon
- In office 14 December 1918 – 15 November 1922
- Preceded by: New constituency
- Succeeded by: William Whiteley

Member of Parliament for Banffshire
- In office 16 February 1907 – 14 December 1918
- Preceded by: Alexander William Black
- Succeeded by: Charles Barrie

London County Councilor for Lewisham East
- In office 5 March 1925 – 8 March 1928
- Preceded by: Richard Roberts
- Succeeded by: Paul Latham

Personal details
- Born: 1876
- Died: 16 November 1930 (aged 53–54)
- Party: Conservative (1925–1930)
- Other political affiliations: Liberal (Before 1916, 1923–1925); Coalition Liberal (1916–1922); National Liberal (1922–1923)
- Spouse: Lady Clementine Hay CBE (m. 1901)
- Children: 2
- Parents: Charles Waring (father); Eliza Denys (mother)
- Relatives: William Hay (father-in-law); George Denys (maternal grandfather)
- Education: Eton College
- Military career
- Allegiance: United Kingdom
- Branch: British Army; Royal Navy
- Service years: 1897-1918
- Rank: Captain
- Units: 1st Life Guards; Yeomanry; Naval Intelligence Division
- Conflicts: Second Boer War; World War I; Macedonian front; Western Front
- Awards: Queen's South Africa Medal; Mentioned in dispatches Legion of Honour

Walter Waring JP DL (1876 – 16 November 1930) was a British politician

== Early life and career ==
The son of Charles Waring, Liberal Member of Parliament for Poole (1874, 1865–1868) and Eliza, daughter of Sir George Denys Bt., of Draycott, Yorkshire, Walter was educated at Eton College.

== Military career ==
He joined the 1st Life Guards in 1897, and served in the Second Boer War 1899-1900 (for which he was awarded the Queen's South Africa Medal and six clasps, and was mentioned in dispatches). He was promoted to the rank of captain in 1904. He served in the Yeomanry during World War I in France and Macedonia, 1915–1917, and in the Naval Intelligence Division during 1918 (and was awarded the Legion of Honour).

He was Master of the Horse to the Lord Lieutenant of Ireland in 1906–1907.

== Political career ==
Waring was unsuccessful Liberal candidate in Wigtownshire in 1906, and served as the Liberal MP for Banffshire from 1907–1918, and as Coalition Liberal for Blaydon from 1918 to 1922, and a National Liberal for Berwick and Haddington from 1922 to 1923, when he lost the seat.

He was the Municipal Reform (Conservative) member of London County Council for Lewisham East from 1925 to 1928. He later contested Wallsend as a Conservative in 1929.

He was Parliamentary Private Secretary to the Parliamentary Secretary to the Board of Agriculture and Fisheries in 1909–1910 and to the Secretary of State for War, 1919–1922.

=== Elections contested ===
==== UK Parliament elections ====
Date of election	Constituency	Party	Votes	%	Result
1906	Wigtownshire	Liberal	2,127	42.6	Not Elected (2nd)
1907	Banffshire	Liberal	3,901	67.3	Elected
1910 (Jan)	Banffshire	Liberal	4,066	66.4	Elected
1910 (Dec)	Banffshire	Liberal	Unopposed		Elected
1918	Blaydon	Coalition Liberal	9,937	52.8	Elected
1922	Berwick and Haddington	National Liberal	6,342	31.9	Elected
1923	Berwick and Haddington	Liberal	6,084	26.3	Not Elected (2nd)
1929	Wallsend	Conservative	12,952	31.9	Not Elected (2nd)

==== London County Council elections ====
Date of election	Constituency	Party	Votes	%	Result
1925	Lewisham East	Municipal Reform	8,191		Elected

== Family ==
In 1901 he married Lady Clementine Hay CBE, only daughter of William Hay, 10th Marquess of Tweeddale. The couple had two daughters.

Parliament of the United Kingdom
Preceded by Alexander William Black	Member of Parliament for Banffshire; 1907–1918	Succeeded by Charles Barrie
New constituency	Member of Parliament for Blaydon; 1918–1922	Succeeded by William Whiteley
Preceded by John Hope	Member of Parliament for Berwick and Haddington; 1922–1923	Succeeded by Robert Spence
