= 1956 Blaydon by-election =

UK parliamentary by-election

The 1956 Blaydon by-election of 2 February 1956 was a by-election held in the British House of Commons constituency of Blaydon in County Durham, the North East of England.

It was caused by the death on 3 November 1955 of William Whiteley, the sitting Labour Party Member of Parliament for the constituency, who had first been elected in 1922 and had represented it ever since with the exception of 1931 to 1935. Labour Party candidate Robert Woof held the seat with little change in the majority.

== Candidates ==
Labour selected Robert Woof, who was a miner and official with the National Union of Mineworkers; Woof, who was 44, had been a member of Durham County Council since 1947. The Conservative Party candidate was John Reay-Smith, a 40-year-old solicitor who had been a member of Bishop Auckland Urban District Council and fought the constituency in the 1955 general election.

== Result ==
Robert Woof won with a majority of 10,714, and went on to hold it for the next 23 years before retiring at the 1979 general election.

Blaydon by-election, 1956
| Party | Candidate | Votes | % | ±% |
|---|---|---|---|---|
| Labour | Robert Woof | 18,791 | 69.94 | +3.47 |
| Conservative | John Reay-Smith | 8,077 | 30.06 | −3.47 |
| Majority | | 10,714 | 39.88 | +6.94 |
| Turnout | | 26,868 | | |
| Labour hold | | Swing | -3.4 | |

== See also ==
- Blaydon (UK Parliament constituency)
- List of United Kingdom by-elections (1950-1979)
