= William Whiteley (politician) =

British Labour Member of Parliament

William Whiteley CH PC DL
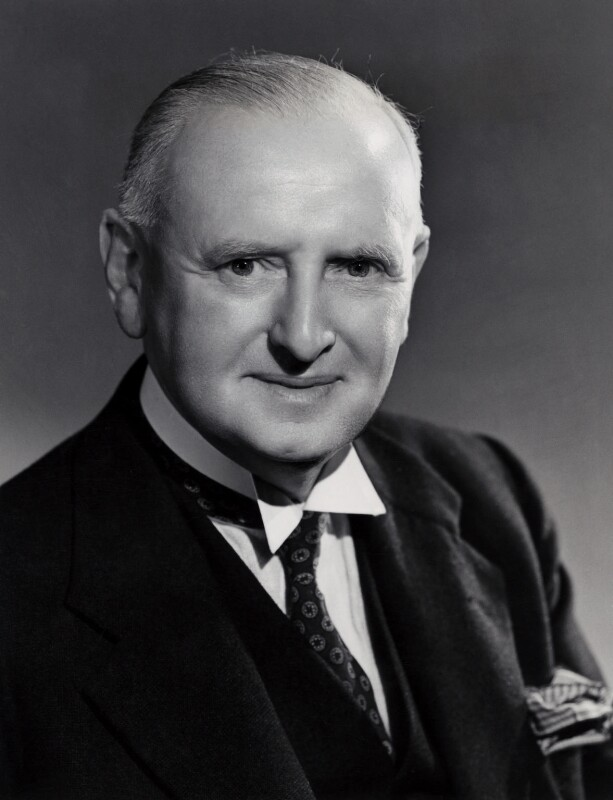
- Whiteley in 1946

Opposition Chief Whip of the House of Commons
- In office 26 October 1951 – 10 June 1955
- Deputy: Herbert Bowden
- Leader: Clement Attlee
- Preceded by: Patrick Buchan-Hepburn
- Succeeded by: Herbert Bowden
- In office 23 May 1945 – 26 July 1945
- Deputy: George Mathers
- Leader: Clement Attlee
- Preceded by: Charles Edwards (1940)
- Succeeded by: James Stuart

Chief Whip of the House of Commons Parliamentary Secretary to the Treasury
- In office 3 August 1945 – 26 October 1951
- Prime Minister: Clement Attlee
- Deputy: George Mathers (1945–46); Arthur Pearson (1946–51)
- Preceded by: James Stuart
- Succeeded by: Patrick Buchan-Hepburn

Parliamentary Secretary to the Treasury
- In office 12 March 1942 – 23 May 1945 Serving with James Stuart
- Prime Minister: Winston Churchill
- Deputy: William John (1942–44); George Mathers (1944–45)
- Preceded by: Charles Edwards
- Succeeded by: James Stuart

Comptroller of the Household
- In office 17 May 1940 – 12 March 1942
- Prime Minister: Winston Churchill
- Preceded by: Charles Kerr
- Succeeded by: William John

Member of Parliament for Blaydon
- In office 14 November 1935 – 3 November 1955
- Preceded by: Thomas Ballantyne Martin
- Succeeded by: Robert Woof
- In office 15 November 1922 – 27 October 1931
- Preceded by: Walter Waring
- Succeeded by: Thomas Ballantyne Martin

Personal details
- Born: 3 October 1882
- Died: 3 November 1955 (aged 73)
- Party: Labour
- Occupation: Coal miner

William Whiteley CH PC DL (3 October 1882 – 3 November 1955) was the Labour Member of Parliament (MP) for Blaydon in County Durham. He held a number of political officers from the 1920s to the 1950s.

== Early life ==
William Whiteley, not to be confused with the founder of the Department Store of the same name, was a Durham miner by background and a lodge official. He was an active trade unionist and member of the Independent Labour Party, later the Labour Party.

== Political career ==
He stood unsuccessfully in Blaydon for Labour in the 1918 general election, but was successful in the election four years later. He went on to be the MP for Blaydon from 1922 to 1931.

His defeat in the 1931 general election followed the events of that summer when Ramsay MacDonald quit the Labour Party to form a National Government and the election called in October that year reduced the Labour representation to a rump of 52 MPs. However Whiteley was re-elected at the 1935 general election and went on to represent the constituency for the next twenty years until his death. In the consequent by-election, the seat was held for Labour by Robert Woof.

During the Churchill war ministry and government of Clement Attlee between 1942 to 1951, he was Parliamentary Secretary to the Treasury.

Whiteley became a Privy Councillor after 1943 and was Labour Chief Whip in the House of Commons for thirteen years from 1942 to 1955.

He was President of the Durham Miners' Homes for the Aged from 1927 to 1955.

He died in 1955 in Durham Hospital at the age of 73.

Parliament of the United Kingdom
Preceded by Walter Waring	Member of Parliament for Blaydon; 1922–1931	Succeeded by Thomas Ballantyne Martin
Preceded by Thomas Ballantyne Martin	Member of Parliament for Blaydon; 1935–1955	Succeeded by Robert Woof
Political offices
Preceded by Charles Kerr	Comptroller of the Household; 1940–1942	Succeeded by William John
Preceded by Charles Edwards	Parliamentary Secretary to the Treasury; 1942–1945; With: James Stuart	Succeeded by James Stuart
Preceded by James Stuart	Parliamentary Secretary to the Treasury; 1945–1951	Succeeded by Patrick Buchan-Hepburn
Party political offices
Preceded by Charles Edwards	Labour Chief Whip of the House of Commons; 1942–1955	Succeeded by Herbert Bowden
Preceded by Wilfred Paling	Deputy Labour Chief Whip of the House of Commons; 1940–1942	Succeeded by William John
