= Walter Richard Owen =

British Labour Party politician

Walter Richard Owen (1880 – 9 July 1959) was a British Labour Party politician, who served as Chair of London County Council.

Owen first came to prominence in 1918, when he became Clerk to the Lewisham Board of Guardians. He served in this role until 1930, when the board was abolished. He was elected to Lewisham Council, representing the Labour Party, and in 1945 became the first Labour Mayor of Lewisham.

In 1934, Owen was elected to London County Council (LCC), in Lewisham East. Following boundary changes, he instead began representing Lewisham South on the LCC, and in 1948, he became chair of the council. That year, a Lewisham South Constituency Labour Party was formed, and Owen was its first president, serving until his death in 1959.

Owen also chaired the management committee of Lewisham Hospital.

Civic offices
Preceded by Eleanor Nathan	Chairman of the London County Council; 1948–1949	Succeeded by John William Bowen
