= Blaydon (constituency) =

Parliamentary constituency in the United Kingdom, 1918–2024

- Former borough constituency for the House of Commons
- 2010–2024 boundary of Blaydon in Tyne and Wear

- Location of Tyne and Wear within England
- County: Tyne and Wear
- Population: 88,281 (2011 census)
- Electorate: 68,156 (December 2010)
- Major settlements: Birtley, Blaydon, Rowlands Gill, Ryton and Whickham

1918–2024
- Seats: One
- Created from: Chester-le-Street and Hexham
- Replaced by: Blaydon and Consett; Gateshead Central and Whickham (part); Washington and Gateshead South (part)

Blaydon was a constituency (Note: A borough constituency (for the purposes of election expenses and type of returning officer).) in Tyne and Wear represented in the House of Commons of the UK Parliament from 1918 until its abolition for the 2024 general election. (Note: As with all current constituencies, the constituency elected one Member of Parliament (MP) by the first past the post system of election at least every five years.) The seat was held continuously by a Labour Member of Parliament (MP) from 1935 onwards. Its final MP was Liz Twist, who was re-elected in 2024 in the newly-created seat of Blaydon and Consett.

== Constituency profile ==
The seat was a safe seat for the Labour Party from 1935 until its abolition.

Historically, the area's economy relied on coal mining from the Victorian period until the decline of mining in the latter half of the 20th century.

By 2024, the economy was supported by engineering and service industries on Tyneside, and agriculture. It also included the Metrocentre, the second-largest shopping centre in the UK.

The constituency was on the western upland outskirts of Gateshead and with communities separated by green buffers. It comprised the towns of Blaydon, Whickham, Ryton, Birtley and surrounding villages in the south and west of the Metropolitan Borough of Gateshead.

== Boundaries ==
=== 1918–1950 ===
- The Urban Districts of Blaydon, Ryton, Tanfield, and Whickham.

Blaydon was created under the Representation of the People Act 1918 for the 1918 general election when Blaydon, Ryton and Whickham were split off from the existing Chester-le-Street seat. Tanfield was added from the abolished constituency of North West Durham.

=== 1950–1983 ===
- The Urban Districts of Blaydon, Ryton, and Whickham.

Tanfield transferred to Consett.

=== 1983–2010 ===
- The Borough of Gateshead wards of Birtley, Blaydon, Chopwell and Rowlands Gill, Crawcrook and Greenside, Lamesley, Ryton, Whickham North, Whickham South, and Winlaton.

The communities of Birtley and Lamesley were transferred in from the abolished constituency of Chester-le-Street. Lost small area in the east of the seat to the new constituency of Tyne Bridge.

=== 2010–2024 ===
Map of boundaries 2010-2024

- The Borough of Gateshead wards of Birtley, Blaydon, Chopwell and Rowlands Gill, Crawcrook and Greenside, Dunston Hill and Whickham East, Lamesley, Ryton, Crookhill and Stella, Whickham North, Whickham South and Sunniside, and Winlaton and High Spen.

Minor changes resulting from the redrawing of ward boundaries in Gateshead Borough and abolition of Tyne Bridge.

== Abolition ==
Further to the completion of the 2023 review of Westminster constituencies, the seat was abolished for the 2024 general election, with its contents distributed to three new constituencies:

- The three wards incorporating the town of Whickham included in an expanded Gateshead constituency named Gateshead Central and Whickham
- Birtley and Lamesley combined with Washington to form Washington and Gateshead South
- Remaining wards (comprising about half the electorate), including the communities of Blaydon, Rowlands Gill and Ryton, to form a cross-county constituency with Consett in County Durham - named Blaydon and Consett

== Members of Parliament ==
Election	Member	Whip
1918	Walter Waring	Coalition Liberal
Jan 1922	Walter Waring	National Liberal
1922	William Whiteley	Labour
1931	Thomas Martin	Conservative
1935	William Whiteley	Labour
1956 by-election	Robert Woof	Labour
1979	John McWilliam	Labour
2005	David Anderson	Labour
2017	Liz Twist	Labour
2024	Constituency abolished	

== Election results 1918–2024 ==
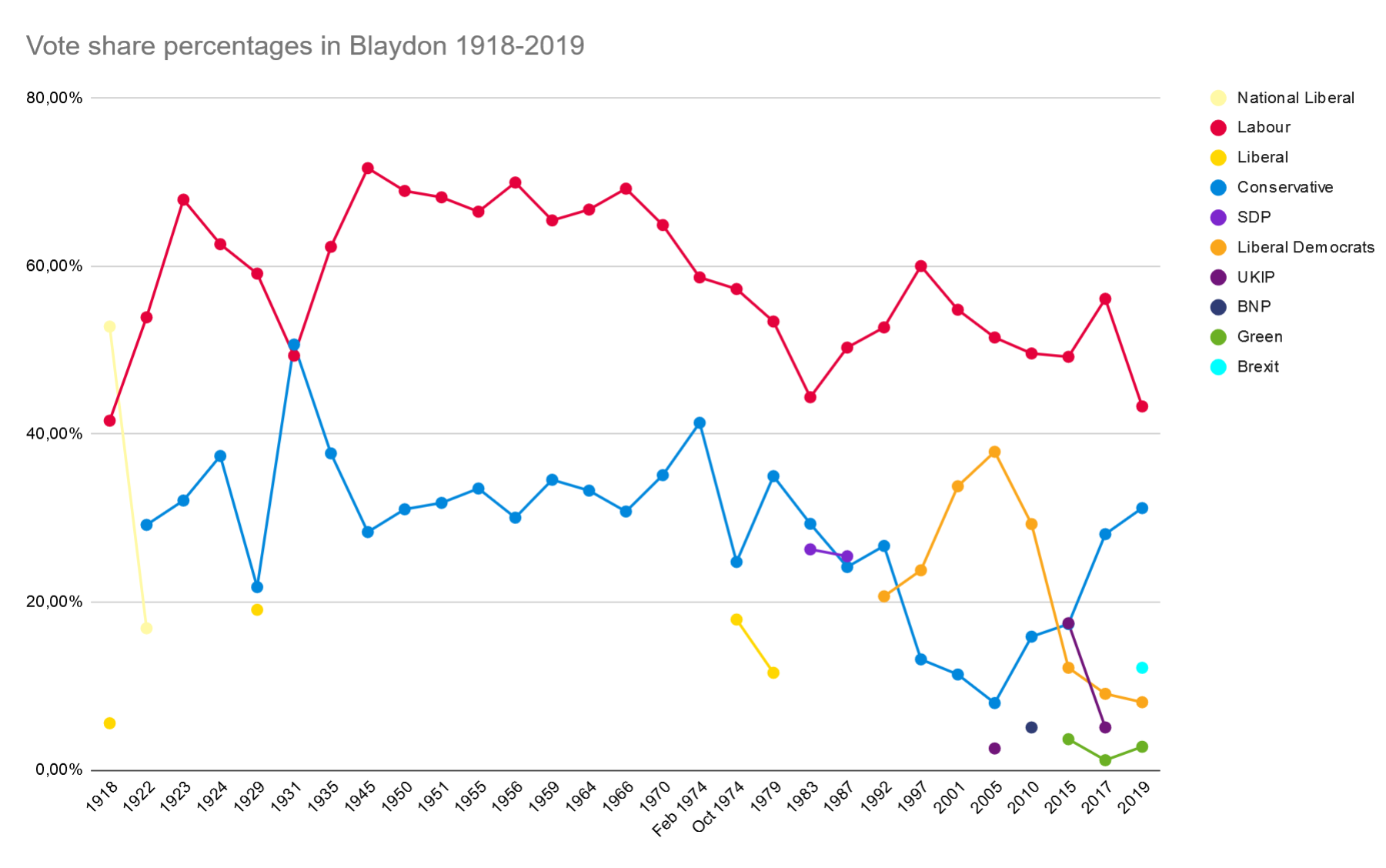

=== Elections in the 1910s ===
Waring

General election 1918: Blaydon
Party		Candidate	Votes	%
C	National Liberal	Walter Waring	9,937	52.8
	Labour	William Whiteley	7,844	41.6
	Liberal	Thomas George Graham	1,064	5.6
Majority			2,093	11.2
Turnout			18,845	57.4
	National Liberal win (new seat)			
C indicates candidate endorsed by the coalition government.

=== Elections in the 1920s ===
General election 1922: Blaydon
Party	Candidate	Votes	%	±%
Labour	William Whiteley	14,722	53.9	+12.3
Unionist	Sir Frank Robert Simpson, 1st Baronet	7,963	29.2	New
National Liberal	Frederick William Cook	4,606	16.9	−35.9
Majority		6,759	24.7	N/A
Turnout		27,291	77.0	+19.6
Registered electors		35,434		
Labour gain from National Liberal		Swing	N/A	

General election 1923: Blaydon
Party	Candidate	Votes	%	±%
Labour	William Whiteley	15,073	67.9	+14.0
Unionist	George Denson	7,124	32.1	+2.9
Majority		7,949	35.8	+11.1
Turnout		22,197	62.1	−14.9
Registered electors		35,764		
Labour hold		Swing	+5.6	

General election 1924: Blaydon
Party	Candidate	Votes	%	±%
Labour	William Whiteley	17,670	62.6	−5.3
Unionist	George Denson	10,549	37.4	+5.3
Majority		7,121	25.2	−10.6
Turnout		28,219	77.0	+14.9
Registered electors		36,646		
Labour hold		Swing	−5.3	

General election 1929: Blaydon
Party	Candidate	Votes	%	±%
Labour	William Whiteley	21,221	59.1	−3.5
Unionist	R. Charles White	7,847	21.8	−15.6
Liberal	Thomas Magnay	6878	19.1	New
Majority		13,374	37.3	+12.1
Turnout		35,946	79.5	+2.5
Registered electors		45,204		
Labour hold		Swing	+6.0	

=== Elections in the 1930s ===
General election 1931: Blaydon
Party	Candidate	Votes	%	±%
Conservative	Thomas Martin	18,927	50.66	
Labour	William Whiteley	18,431	49.34	
Majority		496	1.32	N/A
Turnout		37,358	80.95	
Conservative gain from Labour		Swing		

General election 1935: Blaydon
Party	Candidate	Votes	%	±%
Labour	William Whiteley	24,148	62.29	
Conservative	Charles Edwin Vickery	14,622	37.71	
Majority		9,526	24.58	N/A
Turnout		38,770	80.76	
Labour gain from Conservative		Swing		

=== Election in the 1940s ===
General election 1945: Blaydon
Party	Candidate	Votes	%	±%
Labour	William Whiteley	29,931	71.65	
Conservative	Edward Charles Peake	11,842	28.35	
Majority		18,089	43.30	
Turnout		41,773	79.70	
Labour hold		Swing		

=== Elections in the 1950s ===
General election 1950: Blaydon
Party	Candidate	Votes	%	±%
Labour	William Whiteley	28,343	68.94	
Conservative	Leslie Frances Lawson	12,772	31.06	
Majority		15,571	37.88	
Turnout		41,115	87.46	
Labour hold		Swing		

General election 1951: Blaydon
Party	Candidate	Votes	%	±%
Labour	William Whiteley	28,337	68.18	
Conservative	Charles Percy Lawler Satchwell	13,223	31.82	
Majority		15,114	36.36	
Turnout		41,560	87.60	
Labour hold		Swing		

General election 1955: Blaydon
Party	Candidate	Votes	%	±%
Labour	William Whiteley	25,273	66.47	
Conservative	John Morley Reay-Smith	12,750	33.53	
Majority		12,523	32.94	
Turnout		38,023	80.66	
Labour hold		Swing		

1956 Blaydon by-election
Party	Candidate	Votes	%	±%
Labour	Robert Woof	18,791	69.94	+3.47
Conservative	John Morley Reay-Smith	8,077	30.06	−3.47
Majority		10,714	39.88	+6.94
Turnout		26,868		
Labour hold		Swing	-3.4	

General election 1959: Blaydon
Party	Candidate	Votes	%	±%
Labour	Robert Woof	25,969	65.43	
Conservative	Godfrey William Iredell	13,719	34.57	
Majority		12,250	30.86	
Turnout		39,688	82.94	
Labour hold		Swing		

=== Elections in the 1960s ===
General election 1964: Blaydon
Party	Candidate	Votes	%	±%
Labour	Robert Woof	25,926	66.72	
Conservative	Neville Cooper Bailey	12,932	33.28	
Majority		12,994	33.44	
Turnout		38,858	80.01	
Labour hold		Swing		

General election 1966: Blaydon
Party	Candidate	Votes	%	±%
Labour	Robert Woof	26,629	69.21	
Conservative	Bernard Bligh	11,849	30.79	
Majority		14,780	38.42	
Turnout		38,478	77.45	
Labour hold		Swing		

=== Elections in the 1970s ===
General election 1970: Blaydon
Party	Candidate	Votes	%	±%
Labour	Robert Woof	25,724	64.88	
Conservative	Norman H. D'Aguiar	13,926	35.12	
Majority		11,798	29.76	
Turnout		39,650	72.30	
Labour hold		Swing		

General election February 1974: Blaydon
Party	Candidate	Votes	%	±%
Labour	Robert Woof	22,279	58.65	
Conservative	A.A. Craig	15,705	41.35	
Majority		6,574	17.30	
Turnout		37,984	67.25	
Labour hold		Swing		

General election October 1974: Blaydon
Party	Candidate	Votes	%	±%
Labour	Robert Woof	23,743	57.27	
Conservative	A.A. Craig	10,277	24.79	
Liberal	Paul Barker	7,439	17.94	New
Majority		13,466	32.48	
Turnout		41,409	69.20	
Labour hold		Swing		

General election 1979: Blaydon
Party	Candidate	Votes	%	±%
Labour	John McWilliam	24,687	53.40	
Conservative	T. Middleton	16,178	35.00	
Liberal	David Hutton	5,364	11.60	
Majority		8,509	18.40	
Turnout		46,229	79.07	
Labour hold		Swing		

=== Elections in the 1980s ===
General election 1983: Blaydon
Party	Candidate	Votes	%	±%
Labour	John McWilliam	21,285	44.4	−9.0
Conservative	Andrew Williams	14,063	29.3	−5.7
SDP	Maurice Carr	12,607	26.3	N/A
Majority		7,222	15.1	−3.3
Turnout		47,955	73.2	−5.9
Labour hold		Swing	-1.7	

General election 1987: Blaydon
Party	Candidate	Votes	%	±%
Labour	John McWilliam	25,277	50.3	+5.9
SDP	Paul Nunn	12,789	25.5	−0.8
Conservative	Peter Pescod	12,147	24.2	−5.1
Majority		12,488	24.8	+9.7
Turnout		50,213	75.7	+2.5
Labour hold		Swing		

=== Elections in the 1990s ===
General election 1992: Blaydon
Party	Candidate	Votes	%	±%
Labour	John McWilliam	27,028	52.7	+2.4
Conservative	Peter Pescod	13,685	26.7	+2.5
Liberal Democrats	Paul Nunn	10,602	20.7	−4.8
Majority		13,343	26.0	+1.1
Turnout		51,315	77.7	+2.0
Labour hold		Swing	−0.1	

General election 1997: Blaydon
Party	Candidate	Votes	%	±%
Labour	John McWilliam	27,535	60.0	+7.3
Liberal Democrats	Peter J. Maughan	10,930	23.8	+3.1
Conservative	Mark A. Watson	6,048	13.2	−13.5
Independent	Richard J. Rook	1,412	3.1	New
Majority		16,605	36.2	+10.2
Turnout		45,925	71.0	−6.7
Labour hold		Swing		

=== Elections in the 2000s ===
General election 2001: Blaydon
Party	Candidate	Votes	%	±%
Labour	John McWilliam	20,340	54.8	−5.2
Liberal Democrats	Peter J. Maughan	12,531	33.8	+10.0
Conservative	Mark A. Watson	4,215	11.4	−1.8
Majority		7,809	21.0	−15.2
Turnout		37,086	57.4	−13.6
Labour hold		Swing		

General election 2005: Blaydon
Party	Candidate	Votes	%	±%
Labour	David Anderson	20,120	51.5	−3.3
Liberal Democrats	Peter J. Maughan	14,785	37.9	+4.1
Conservative	Dorothy Luckhurst	3,129	8.0	−3.4
UKIP	Norman R. Endacott	1,019	2.6	New
Majority		5,335	13.7	−7.3
Turnout		39,053	62.6	+5.2
Labour hold		Swing	−3.7	

=== Elections in the 2010s ===
General election 2010: Blaydon
Party	Candidate	Votes	%	±%
Labour	David Anderson	22,297	49.6	−1.9
Liberal Democrats	Neil Bradbury	13,180	29.3	−8.5
Conservative	Glenn Hall	7,159	15.9	+7.9
BNP	Keith McFarlane	2,277	5.1	New
Majority		9,117	20.3	+6.6
Turnout		44,913	66.2	+4.0
Labour hold		Swing	−4.5	

General election 2015: Blaydon
Party	Candidate	Votes	%	±%
Labour	David Anderson	22,090	49.2	−0.6
UKIP	Mark Bell	7,863	17.5	New
Conservative	Alison Griffiths	7,838	17.4	+1.5
Liberal Democrats	Jonathan Wallace	5,497	12.2	−17.1
Green	Paul McNally	1,648	3.7	New
Majority		14,227	31.7	+11.4
Turnout		44,936	66.2	0.0
Labour hold		Swing	-9.0	

General election 2017: Blaydon
Party	Candidate	Votes	%	±%
Labour	Liz Twist	26,979	56.1	+6.9
Conservative	Tom Smith	13,502	28.1	+10.6
Liberal Democrats	Jonathan Wallace	4,366	9.1	−3.1
UKIP	Ray Tolley	2,459	5.1	−12.4
Green	Paul McNally	583	1.2	−2.5
Libertarian	Michael Marchetti	114	0.2	New
Space Navies Party	Lisabela Marschild	81	0.2	New
Majority		13,477	28.0	−3.7
Turnout		48,084	70.2	+4.0
Labour hold		Swing	-1.85	

General election 2019: Blaydon
Party	Candidate	Votes	%	±%
Labour	Liz Twist	19,794	43.3	−12.8
Conservative	Adrian Pepper	14,263	31.2	+3.1
Brexit Party	Michael Robinson	5,833	12.8	New
Liberal Democrats	Vicky Anderson	3,703	8.1	−1.0
Green	Diane Cadman	1,279	2.8	+1.6
Liberal	Kathy King	615	1.3	New
Space Navies Party	Lisabela Marschild	118	0.3	+0.1
Independent	Lee Garrett	76	0.2	New
Majority		5,531	12.1	−15.9
Turnout		45,681	67.3	−2.9
Labour hold		Swing	−8.0	

== See also ==
- List of parliamentary constituencies in Tyne and Wear
- History of parliamentary constituencies and boundaries in Tyne and Wear
- History of parliamentary constituencies and boundaries in Durham
