= 1874 Poole by-election =

UK Parliamentary by-election

The 1874 Poole by-election was held on 26 May 1874. It was caused by the election being declared void on petition, after "corrupt conduct and treating". It was retained by Liberal MP, Evelyn Ashley.

1874 Poole by-election
Party	Candidate	Votes	%	±%
Liberal	Evelyn Ashley	631	50.4	−4.5
Conservative	Ivor Guest	622	49.6	+4.5
Majority		9	0.8	−9.0
Turnout		1,253	82.1	−2.1
Registered electors		1,526		
Liberal hold		Swing	-4.5	
