= Hamish Watt =

Scottish politician (1925–2014)

Member of Parliament for Banffshire
- In office 28 February 1974 – 7 April 1979
- Preceded by: Wilfred Baker
- Succeeded by: David Myles
- Majority: 1,851

Personal details
- Born: 27 December 1925 Keith, Scotland
- Died: 12 April 2014 (aged 88) Portgordon, Moray, Scotland
- Party: Scottish National Party
- Children: Maureen Watt
- Education: University of St Andrews
- Profession: Farmer

Hamish Watt (27 December 1925 – 12 April 2014) was a Scottish politician, farmer and writer. He was the SNP MP for Banffshire from 1974 to 1979, and was later Rector of the University of Aberdeen and a councillor.

== Early life ==
He was born on 27 December 1925 in Keith, Scotland. The son of William Watt and Caroline Allan, he was educated at Keith Grammar School and at the University of St Andrews, and was involved in dairy and sheep farming and other business interests.

== Political career ==
He contested Caithness and Sutherland as the Conservative candidate in 1966. He then switched to the Scottish National Party (SNP), contesting Banffshire in 1970.

He was elected as Member of Parliament (MP) for the Banffshire seat in the Feb 1974 general election, holding it until the 1979 election. He was one of 11 SNP MPs elected in 1974. In October, he was announced as the SNP's spokesperson on agriculture and fisheries. Later in this parliamentary session, he spent two years as the party's chief whip. After a boundary change, he was the unsuccessful SNP candidate for Moray in the 1983 UK general election.

He was later a regional and district councillor with Moray District Council, and Grampian Regional Council from 1985 to 1990 (including serving as chairman of the Grampian Education Committee from 1986 to 1990). He sought reselection as an SNP candidate in the Grampian region, but was turned down by the party.

In the 1999 Scottish Parliament election, he stood as an independent candidate for Gordon, but finished fifth.

== Later life ==
He was Rector of the University of Aberdeen from 1985 to 1988. Latterly, he was a newspaper columnist, after-dinner speaker and author. He was parodied as "Hamish Banff" in the 7:84 theatre company's play Little Red Hen.

== Honours ==
Watt was awarded an honorary LLD by the University of Aberdeen in 1988.

== Personal life ==
His daughter, Maureen Watt, became an MSP in 2006, and his grandson, Stuart Donaldson, (Maureen's son) was elected in 2015 as the MP for West Aberdeenshire and Kincardine.

Watt died aged 88, at his home in Portgordon, on 12 April 2014.

Parliament of the United Kingdom
| Preceded by Wilfred Baker | Member of Parliament for Banffshire; Feb 1974–1979 | Succeeded by David Myles |
Academic offices
| Preceded by Robert J. Perryment | Rector of the University of Aberdeen; 1985–1988 | Succeeded by Willis Pickard |
