= Wilfred Baker =

British politician

Willfred Harold Kerton Baker (Note: Baker's first name is spelt "Willfred" in both Who's Who and his obituary in The Times.) (6 January 1920 – 9 November 2000), known as Bill Baker, was a British Conservative Party politician. He was member of parliament for Banffshire from 1964 to 1974, when he lost his seat in the February election of that year to Hamish Watt of the Scottish National Party.

== Biography ==
Baker was born in Weymouth, Dorset. His father died when he was ten, and his mother married a parson. He attended The Thomas Hardye School in Dorchester before starting a medicine degree at the University of Nottingham. Having joined the Queen's Own Dorset Yeomanry, he was commissioned in the Royal Artillery following the outbreak of World War II. He was then seriously injured in a motorcycle crash, but resumed his war career in 1941. In 1945, he landed in France the day after D-Day in a glider with the 1st Airborne Division, and fought at the Battle of Arnhem. He finished the war with the rank of Major.

After the war, he graduated from the University of Edinburgh with a BSc in agriculture. He subsequently attended Cornell University on a Fulbright scholarship. In 1945 he married Kathleen Sloan Murray Bisset, who had been widowed during the war. From 1949 to 1953 he was factor of her family estates in Aberdeenshire and Banffshire. Later he was a cattle farmer in Rothiemay. He was also a Church of England lay preacher.

He was selected as a Conservative candidate in 1962 and elected in 1964. As an MP, he opposed Britain's entry into the Common Market, and opposed changes to laws on Sunday entertainments.

After leaving Parliament, he relocated to the Channel Islands where he traded stamps, and later moved to Paignton, Devon, where he worked in a job centre.

His first wife, whom he divorced in 1976, died in 1987. They had a son and two daughters. He married his second wife Jean Gordon Scott Skinner in 1978.

== Notes ==
Parliament of the United Kingdom
Preceded by Sir William Duthie	Member of Parliament for Banff; 1964–Feb 1974	Succeeded by Hamish Watt
