= Alexander William Black =

British politician

Alexander Black

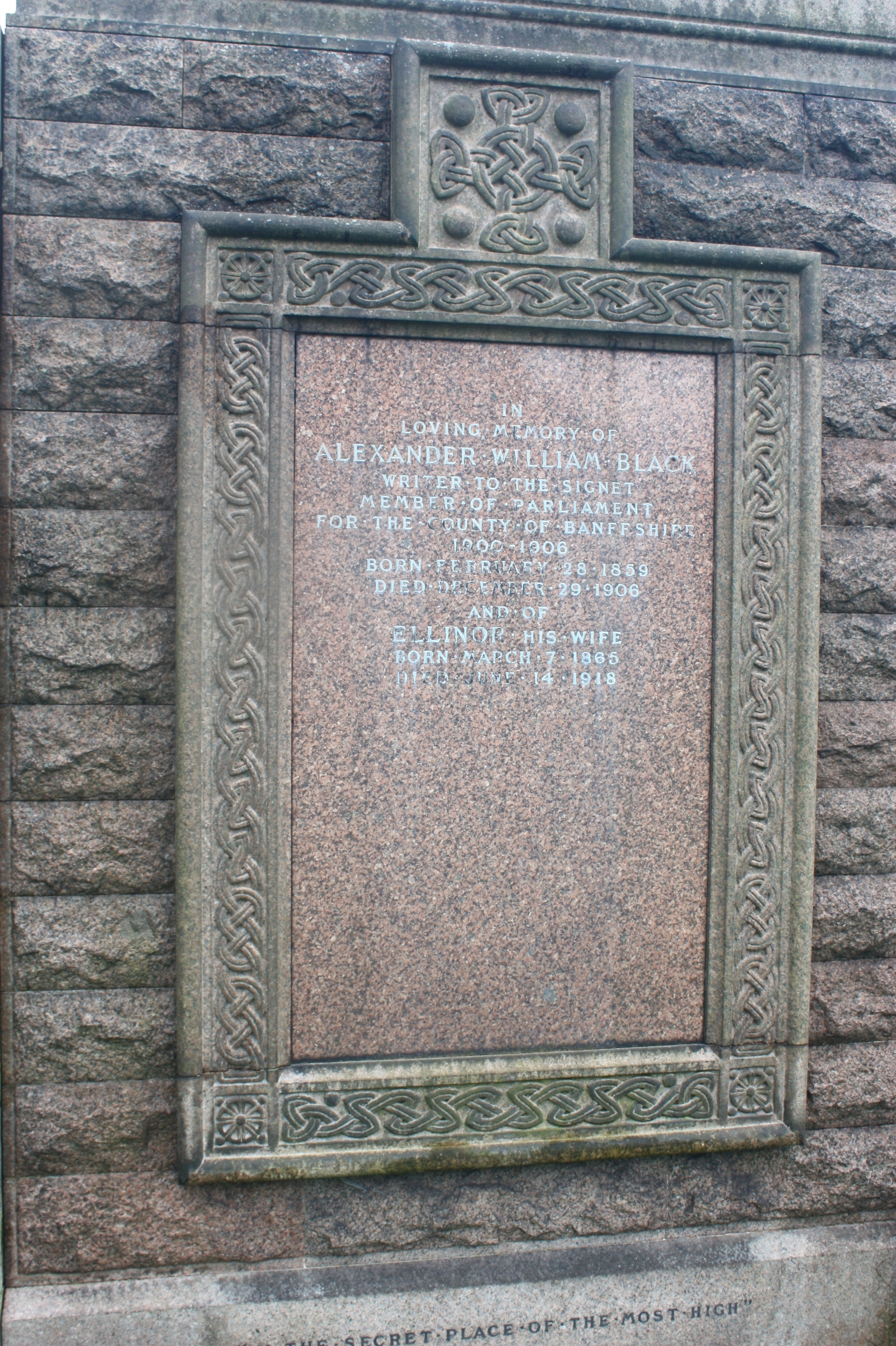
Grave of Alexander William Black, Dean Cemetery

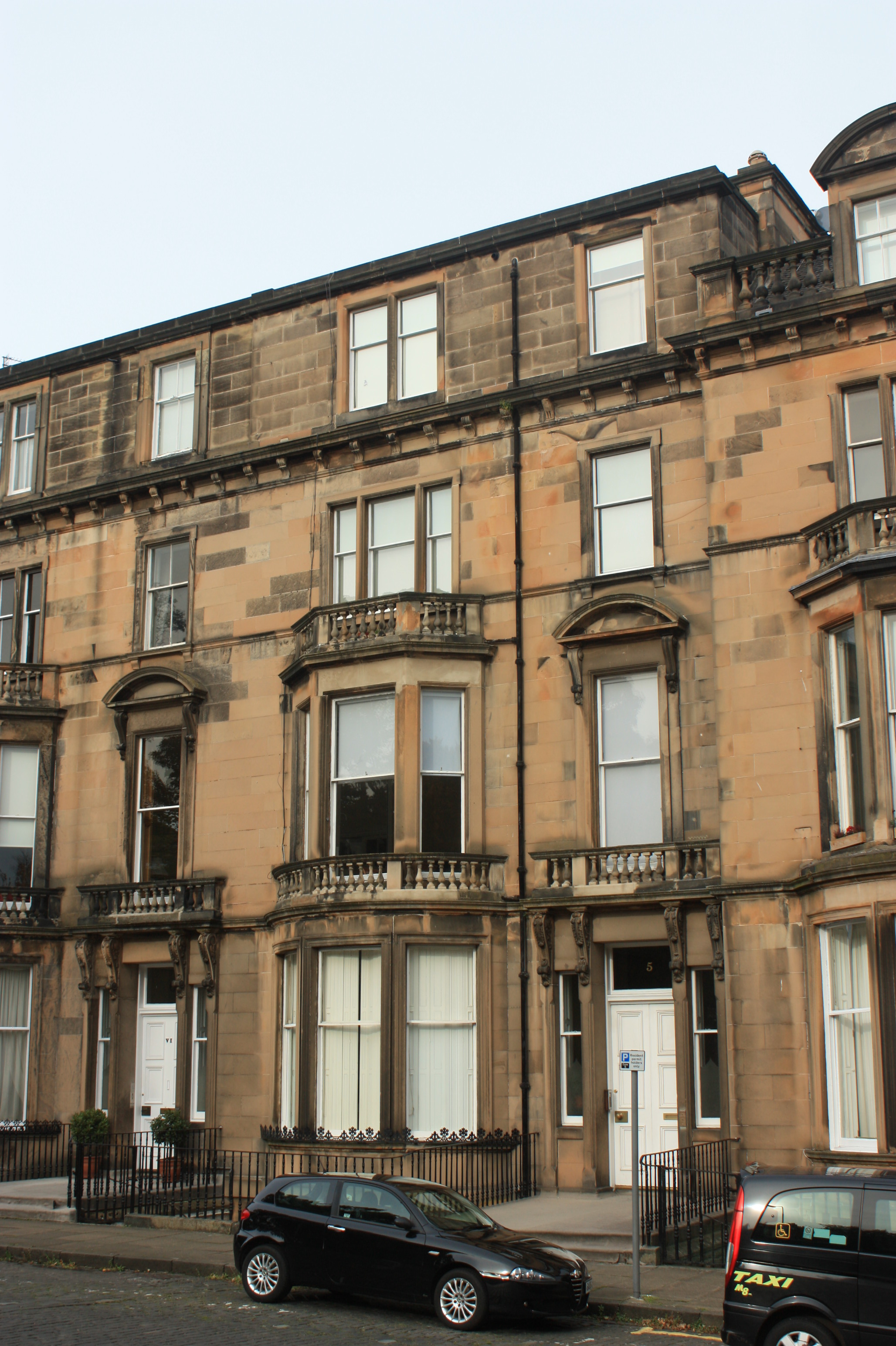
Black's large townhouse at 5 Learmonth Terrace, Edinburgh

Alexander William Black (28 February 1859 – 29 December 1906) was a Liberal Party politician in Scotland.

A lawyer and a Writer to the Signet, he was elected at the 1900 general election as the Member of Parliament (MP) for Banffshire, and was re-elected in 1906. However he died in December that year from injuries received in a railway accident at Elliot Junction, forcing a by-election early in 1907.

In later life he is listed as living at 5 Learmonth Terrace in western Edinburgh.

He is buried near his home, in the north section of Dean Cemetery in Edinburgh towards the south-west corner of the north section. He is buried with his wife Ellinor (1885–1918), some 26 years his junior.

Parliament of the United Kingdom
Preceded by Sir William Wedderburn, Bt	Member of Parliament for Banffshire; 1900 – 1906	Succeeded by Walter Waring
