= Edmund Henry Hambly =

British orthopaedic surgeon and politician

Dr Edmund Henry Tregothwyn Hambly MRCS; FRCS; MB BS; LRCP (24 March 1914 – 9 March 1985), was a British orthopaedic surgeon, Labour Party and Liberal Party politician and a supporter of the preservation of the Cornish language.

== Background ==
Hambly was born in Port Isaac, Cornwall, the son of Edmund Hambly and his wife Gertrude Mary Hotten and grandson of Henry Albert Hambly and his wife Anne née Trevan. He was educated at Blundell's School. He married Elizabeth Mary Cadbury, also a doctor. They had four children, a daughter and three sons. He was an active member of the Society of Friends. He moved to Buckinghamshire in the 1940s. He was made a Freeman of the City of London. He claimed to be the last person left who spoke Cornish. He was active in rekindling the Cornish language. He was, at one time, Bard "Gwas Arthur" at the Cornish Gorsedd.

== Professional career ==
Hambly qualified as a doctor in 1937 when he graduated from St Bartholomew's. He received a Fellowship of the Royal Colleges of Surgeons in 1938. Ill health prevented him from joining the forces in the second world war. He was a Harley Street surgeon. He was chief assistant in orthopaedic surgery at the Westminster Hospital and the Royal National Orthopaedic Hospital throughout the war. He had a special interest in peripheral nerve and spinal management of wounded servicemen. After the war he was appointed consultant orthopaedic surgeon to the Prince of Wales Hospital, Tottenham, the Royal Hospital, Richmond and Acton Hospital. He practised until 1969 when he was forced to retire due to ill health. He was Liveryman of the Worshipful Society of Apothecaries. He was also a farmer in Cornwall.

== Political career ==
Hambly joined the Labour Party. In 1946 he was elected to the London County Council representing Lewisham East. He was appointed vice-chairman of the town and country planning committee. In this role he took an active part in the planning of postwar London. In 1949 he was elected to represent Lewisham South and continued to do so until the LCC was abolished in 1965. He sat as a Labour Party councillor until August 1961 when he resigned from the party, and served the remainder of his term as a member of the Liberal Party. He was Liberal candidate for the Falmouth and Camborne division of Cornwall at the 1964 General Election. He did not stand for parliament again.

=== Electoral record ===
General Election 1964: Falmouth and Camborne
Party	Candidate	Votes	%	±%
Labour	Harold Hayman	18,847	44.5	−1.3
Conservative	Robert Boscawen	15,921	37.6	+1.4
Liberal	Edmund Henry Hambly	7,559	17.9	−0.1
Majority		2,926	6.9	−2.7
Turnout			77.6	−4.0
Labour hold		Swing	-1.3	
