= Lord Robert Seymour =

British politician

Lord Robert Seymour JP

Member of Parliament for Carmarthenshire
- In office 1807–1820
- Preceded by: Sir William Paxton
- Succeeded by: George Rice Rice-Trevor

Member of Parliament for Orford
- In office 1801–1807 Serving with Earl of Yarmouth, James Trail, Lord Henry Moore
- Preceded by: Parliament of Great Britain
- Succeeded by: Lord Henry Moore; William Sloane
- In office 1794–1801 Serving with Lord William Seymour-Conway, Viscount Castlereagh, Earl of Yarmouth
- Preceded by: Viscount Beauchamp; Lord William Seymour-Conway
- Succeeded by: Parliament of the United Kingdom

Member of Parliament for Wootton Bassett
- In office 1784–1790 Serving with George North
- Preceded by: Henry St John; William Strahan
- Succeeded by: John Stanley; The Viscount Downe

Member of Parliament for Orford
- In office 1771–1784 Serving with Viscount Beauchamp
- Preceded by: Viscount Beauchamp; Edward Colman
- Succeeded by: Viscount Beauchamp; George Seymour-Conway

Member of Parliament for Lisburn
- In office 1771–1776 Serving with Francis Price
- Preceded by: Francis Price; Marcus Paterson
- Succeeded by: FitzHerbert Richards; Richard Jackson

Personal details
- Born: 20 January 1748
- Died: 23 November 1831 (aged 83)
- Spouse(s): Anne Delmé (m. 1773; died 1804) Hon. Anderlechtia Chetwynd (m. 1806; died 1831)
- Children: 5
- Parent(s): Francis Seymour-Conway, 1st Marquess of Hertford; Lady Isabella Fitzroy
- Education: Eton College

Lord Robert Seymour JP (20 January 1748 – 23 November 1831) was a British politician who sat in the Irish House of Commons from 1771 to 1776 and in the British House of Commons from 1771 to 1807. He was known as Hon. Robert Seymour-Conway until 1793, when his father was created a marquess; he then became Lord Robert Seymour-Conway, but dropped the surname of Conway after his father's death in 1794.

== Early life ==
Seymour was the third son of Francis Seymour-Conway, 1st Marquess of Hertford and Lady Isabella Fitzroy.

He was educated at Eton, before being commissioned an ensign in the 40th Regiment of Foot in 1766, and became a lieutenant in the 2nd Regiment of Irish Horse the same year. In 1770, he became a captain in the 8th Dragoons.

== Career ==
Seymour-Conway was returned for two Parliamentary seats in 1771: Lisburn, in the Parliament of Ireland, and the family borough of Orford in the British House of Commons. In 1773, he became a major in the 3rd Irish Horse. He transferred into the 1st Foot Guards as a Captain-Lieutenant on 7 November 1775, and became captain of a company in the regiment on 30 January 1776.

He gave up his seat at Lisburn that year, but continued to sit for Orford. He served as an aide-de-camp to Sir Henry Clinton in America from 1780 to 1781, but resigned his commission in 1782.

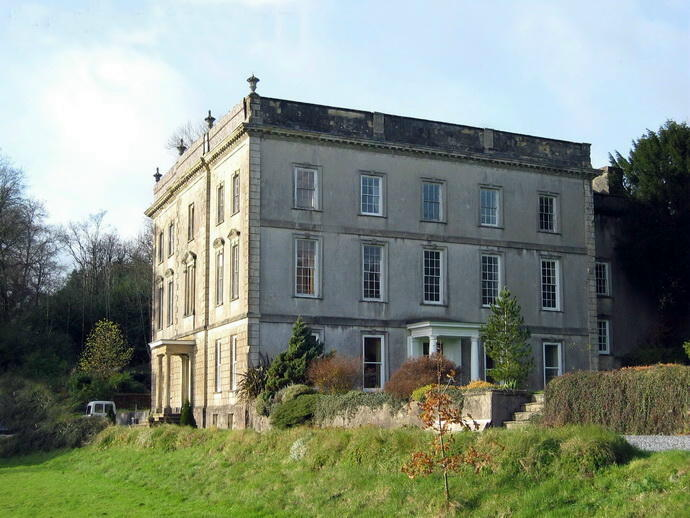
Plas Taliaris Mansion, Seymour bought the house in 1787

In Parliament, Seymour-Conway followed the rest of his family in supporting the North Ministry and the Fox-North Coalition, and opposing the ministry of Shelburne. In 1784, he turned over the Orford seat to his younger brother, George, having purchased a seat at Wootton Bassett from Henry St John, who managed it. In 1787, he bought the estate of Taliaris in Llandeilo, Carmarthenshire, which would become his principal seat. He left his Commons seat in 1790, the year that he and his brother Henry were granted, for life, the sinecures of joint prothonotary, clerk of the crown, filazer, and keeper of the declarations of the King's Bench in Ireland. By 1816, these offices brought an income of more than £10,000 a year.

He returned to Parliament for Orford in 1794, and continued to hold the seat until 1807. He took some interest in agriculture, as in 1796, he invented a new one-horse cart. On 2 December 1803, he was appointed Lieutenant-Colonel Commandant of the 2nd Battalion, Carmarthenshire Volunteers. He resigned that command on 6 January 1808.

During the 1807 election, Seymour was returned both for Orford and Carmarthenshire, choosing to sit for the latter, which he represented until 1820.

On 1 July 1807, Seymour, who owned a house in Portland Place, was sworn a Justice of the Peace for Middlesex. He took an active role in civic affairs in London, and was for some time Director of the Poor for his parish of St Marylebone. This included a particular interest in the care and treatment of the insane, culminating in his appointment in 1827 to the commission superintending the building of Hanwell Asylum and as a Metropolitan Commissioner in Lunacy in 1828. However, he was now approaching the end of his life and played little active role as a Lunatic Commissioner.

In 1829, Seymour funded the building of the north transept and a vicarage for Taliaris Chapel.

== Personal life ==
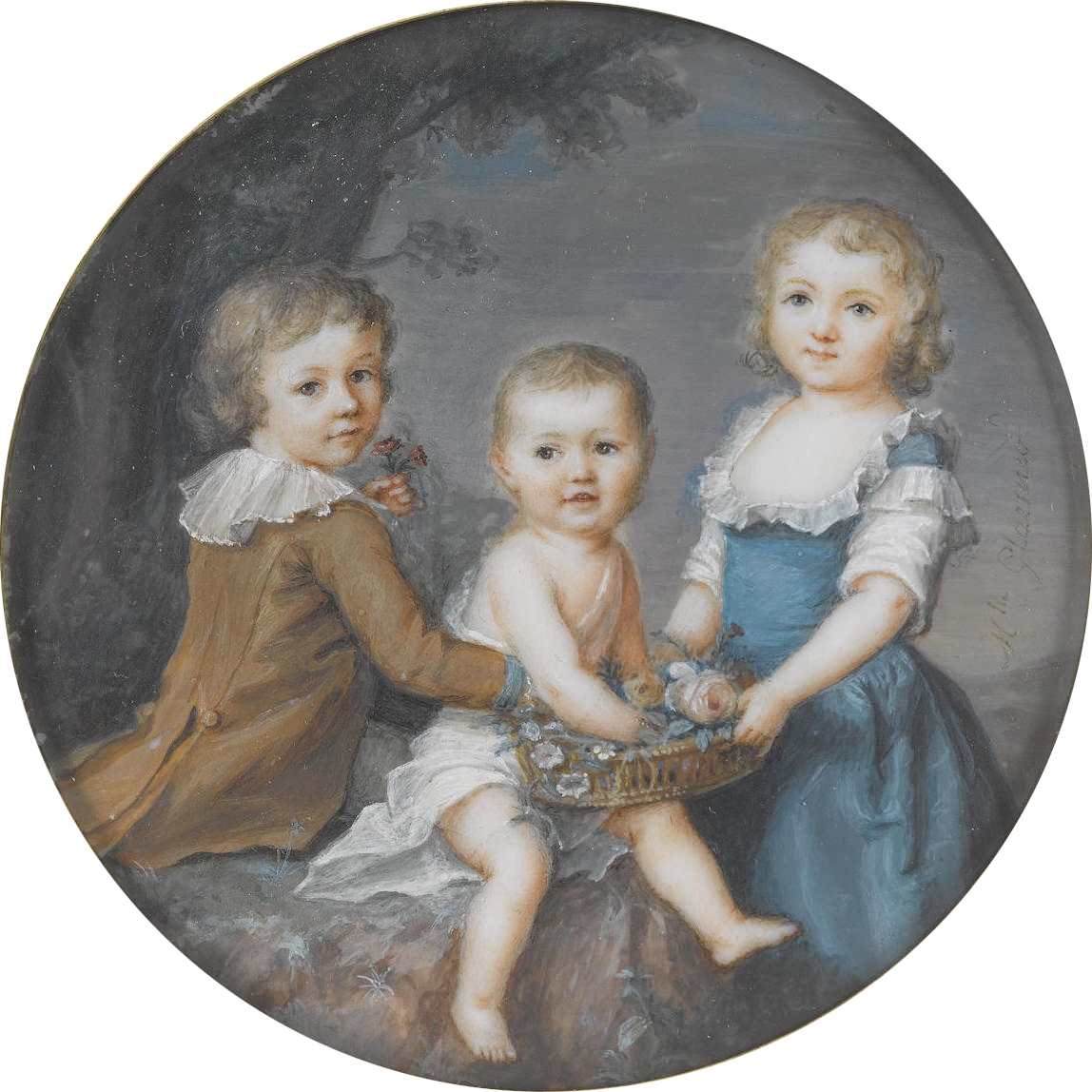
A miniature, possibly portraying the three children of Lord Robert Seymour, by Jeanne Doucet de Surigny before 1807

On 15 June 1773, Lord Robert was married to Anne Delmé, a daughter of Peter Delmé, MP for Ludgershall and Southampton. Before her death on 29 November 1804, they were the parents of five children:

- Elizabeth Seymour (1775–1848), who married William Griffith Davies in 1805. After his death in 1814, she married Herbert Evans in 1817.
- Henry Seymour (c. 1776–1843), who married Hon. Emily Byng (d. 1824), daughter of George Byng, 4th Viscount Torrington, in 1800.
- Frances Isabella Seymour (d. 1838), who married George FitzRoy, 2nd Baron Southampton. They were the parents of Charles FitzRoy, 3rd Baron Southampton.
- Anna Maria Seymour (b. 1781)
- Gertrude Hussey Carpenter Seymour (1784–1825), who married John Hensleigh Allen in 1812. They were the parents of Henry George Allen.

After the death of his first wife, Seymour married Hon. Anderlechtia Clarissa Chetwynd (d. 1855), daughter of William Chetwynd, 4th Viscount Chetwynd, on 2 May 1806. They had no children.

Lord Robert died on 23 November 1831.

== Links ==
- Leigh Rayment's Historical List of MPs
- Extracts from Lord Robert's diary for 1788

Parliament of Ireland
Preceded by Francis Price; Marcus Paterson	Member of Parliament for Lisburn; 1771–1776; With: Francis Price	Succeeded by FitzHerbert Richards; Richard Jackson
Parliament of Great Britain
Preceded by Viscount Beauchamp; Edward Colman	Member of Parliament for Orford; 1771–1784; With: Viscount Beauchamp	Succeeded by Viscount Beauchamp; George Seymour-Conway
Preceded by Henry St John; William Strahan	Member of Parliament for Wootton Bassett; 1784–1790; With: George North	Succeeded by John Stanley; The Viscount Downe
Preceded by Viscount Beauchamp; Lord William Seymour-Conway	Member of Parliament for Orford; 1794–1801; With: Lord William Seymour-Conway 1794–1796; Viscount Castlereagh 1796–1797; Earl of Yarmouth 1797–1801	Succeeded by Parliament of the United Kingdom
Parliament of the United Kingdom
Preceded by Parliament of Great Britain	Member of Parliament for Orford; 1801–1807; With: Earl of Yarmouth 1801–1802; James Trail 1802–1806; Lord Henry Moore 1806–1807	Succeeded by Lord Henry Moore; William Sloane
Preceded by Sir William Paxton	Member of Parliament for Carmarthenshire; 1807–1820	Succeeded by George Rice Rice-Trevor
