= Lord George Seymour =

British politician (1763–1848)

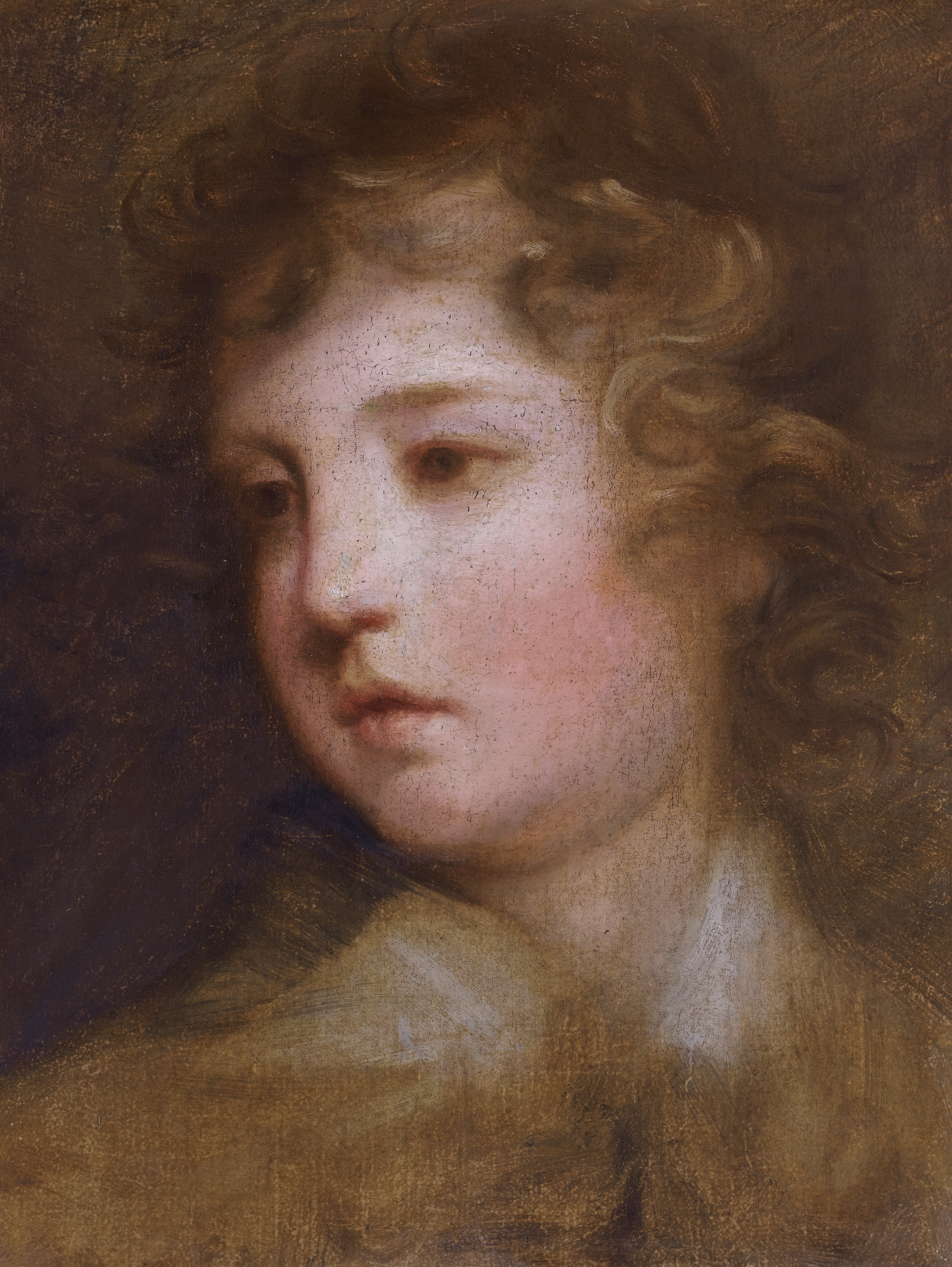
George Seymour Conway (1763-1848) as a boy, (Joshua Reynolds, before 1770)

Lord George Seymour-Conway (21 July 1763 – 10 March 1848), known as Lord George Seymour, was a British politician.

A member of the Seymour family headed by the Duke of Somerset, Seymour was the seventh son and youngest child of Francis Seymour-Conway, 1st Marquess of Hertford, and Lady Isabella, daughter of Charles FitzRoy, 2nd Duke of Grafton. He was the brother of Francis Ingram-Seymour-Conway, 2nd Marquess of Hertford, Lord Henry Seymour, Lord Robert Seymour, Lord Hugh Seymour and Lord William Seymour.

He was returned to the Parliament of Great Britain as one of two representatives for Orford in 1784, a seat he held until 1790. He later represented Totnes between 1796 and 1801.

Seymour married Isabella, daughter of Reverend the Honourable George Hamilton, in 1795. Their son Sir George Hamilton Seymour was a diplomat and their daughters married into the peerage, Emily Henrietta became Countess of Shannon, wife of Richard Boyle, 4th Earl of Shannon and Isabella Horatia became Baroness Ravensworth, wife of Henry Liddell, 2nd Baron Ravensworth. Seymour died on 10 March 1848, aged 84, and is buried in St. Andrew's Church, Waterloo Street Hove in Sussex

Through his daughter Emily, he was the maternal grandfather of Henry Boyle, 5th Earl of Shannon, and through his daughter Isabella, he was the maternal grandfather of Henry Liddell, 2nd Earl of Ravensworth.

Parliament of Great Britain
| Preceded by Viscount Beauchamp; Hon. Robert Seymour | Member of Parliament for Orford; 1784–1790; With: Viscount Beauchamp | Succeeded by Viscount Beauchamp; Hon. William Seymour |
| Preceded by William Powlett Powlett; Francis Buller-Yarde | Member of Parliament for Totnes; 1796–1801; With: The Lord Arden | Succeeded by Parliament of the United Kingdom |
Parliament of the United Kingdom
| Preceded by Parliament of Great Britain | Member of Parliament for Totnes; 1801; With: The Lord Arden | Succeeded by The Lord Arden; William Adams |
