= Francis Ingram-Seymour-Conway, 2nd Marquess of Hertford =

British politician

The Most Honourable The Marquess of Hertford KG, PC, PC (Ire)
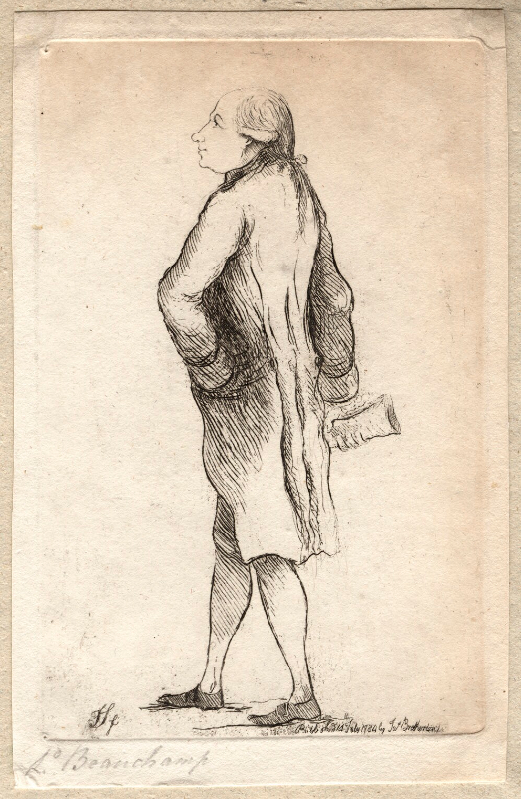

Chief Secretary for Ireland
- In office 1765–1766
- Monarch: George III
- Prime Minister: The Marquess of Rockingham
- Preceded by: The Earl of Drogheda
- Succeeded by: Augustus Hervey

Master of the Horse
- In office 1804–1806
- Monarch: George III
- Prime Minister: William Pitt the Younger
- Preceded by: The Earl of Chesterfield
- Succeeded by: William Pitt the Younger

Lord Chamberlain of the Household
- In office 1812 – 14 December 1821
- Monarchs: George III; George IV
- Prime Minister: Spencer Perceval; The Earl of Liverpool
- Preceded by: The Earl of Dartmouth
- Succeeded by: The Duke of Montrose

Personal details
- Born: 12 February 1743 London, England
- Died: 17 June 1822 (aged 79) London, England
- Party: Tory
- Spouses: Alice Elizabeth Windsor (m. 1768–1772); Isabella Anne Ingram (m. 1776–1822)
- Children: 2, including Francis
- Parents: Francis Seymour-Conway, 1st Marquess of Hertford; Lady Isabella Fitzroy

Francis Ingram-Seymour-Conway, 2nd Marquess of Hertford (12 February 1743 – 17 June 1822), styled The Honourable Francis Seymour-Conway until 1750, Viscount Beauchamp between 1750 and 1793, and Earl of Yarmouth between 1793 and 1794, was a British politician. He held seats in the Irish House of Commons from 1761 to 1776 and in the British House of Commons from 1766 to 1794. He served as Chief Secretary for Ireland under his father. He subsequently held positions in the Royal Household, including serving as Lord Chamberlain between 1812 and 1822.

== Background and education ==
A member of the Seymour family headed by the Duke of Somerset, Hertford was the eldest son of Francis Seymour-Conway, 1st Marquess of Hertford, and Lady Isabella Fitzroy, daughter of Charles FitzRoy, 2nd Duke of Grafton, born on 12 January 1743 in London. He was the elder brother of Lord Robert Seymour and Lord Hugh Seymour. He was educated at Eton and Christ Church, Oxford.

== Political career ==
In 1761, Hertford entered the Irish House of Commons for Lisburn, and later represented County Antrim between 1768 and 1776. He was sworn of the Irish Privy Council in 1775, and served as Chief Secretary for Ireland between 1765 and 1766 to the Lord Lieutenant of Ireland, his father. In 1766, he entered the British House of Commons as Member of Parliament for Lostwithiel, changing in 1768 to represent Orford until he succeeded his father in 1794.

In 1783, Hertford was defied by his tenants in Lisburn. They elected Todd Jones, a captain in the Irish Volunteer movement, on a platform calling for the independence and reform of the Irish parliament. In 1790, with Jones arguing that reform was impossible without Catholic emancipation, Hertford's nominees regained parliamentary control of the borough.

Hertford was himself sympathetic to the case for Catholic "relief" (in May 1778 he declared himself strongly in favour of the repeal of the penal acts affecting Roman Catholics) and in "A Letter to the First Company of Belfast Volunteers", published in Dublin, 1782, he endorsed the case for Ireland's legislative independence. He did not, however, embrace the call for parliamentary reform (abolition of the proprietary boroughs and a broader franchise) and he was averse to any further assertion of Irish independence.

On 2 January 1765 he was commissioned as Colonel of the Warwickshire Militia, and commanded it when it volunteered for service in Ireland during the Rebellion of 1798. It was present at the Battle of Ballinamuck when Gen Humbert's Franco-Irish army was compelled to surrender.

Hertford served under Lord North, firstly as a Lord of the Treasury from 1774, and then from 1780 as Cofferer of the Household, a post he held until its abolishment in 1782. In 1780 he was also sworn of the British Privy Council. He remained out of office until 1804, when he was made Master of the Horse by William Pitt the Younger. He continued in this position until Pitt's death in 1806 and later served under Spencer Perceval and Lord Liverpool as Lord Chamberlain of the Household between 1812 and 1821.

Apart from his political career Hertford was also Lord Lieutenant of Warwickshire between 1816 and 1822, and Governor of County Antrim. In 1807 he was appointed a Knight of the Garter.

Shortly before his death, he was refused a dukedom by Lord Liverpool. In 1829, he ordered MPs beholden to him to vote for the Roman Catholic Relief Act which finally removed the Protestant monopoly on Parliament.

== Family ==
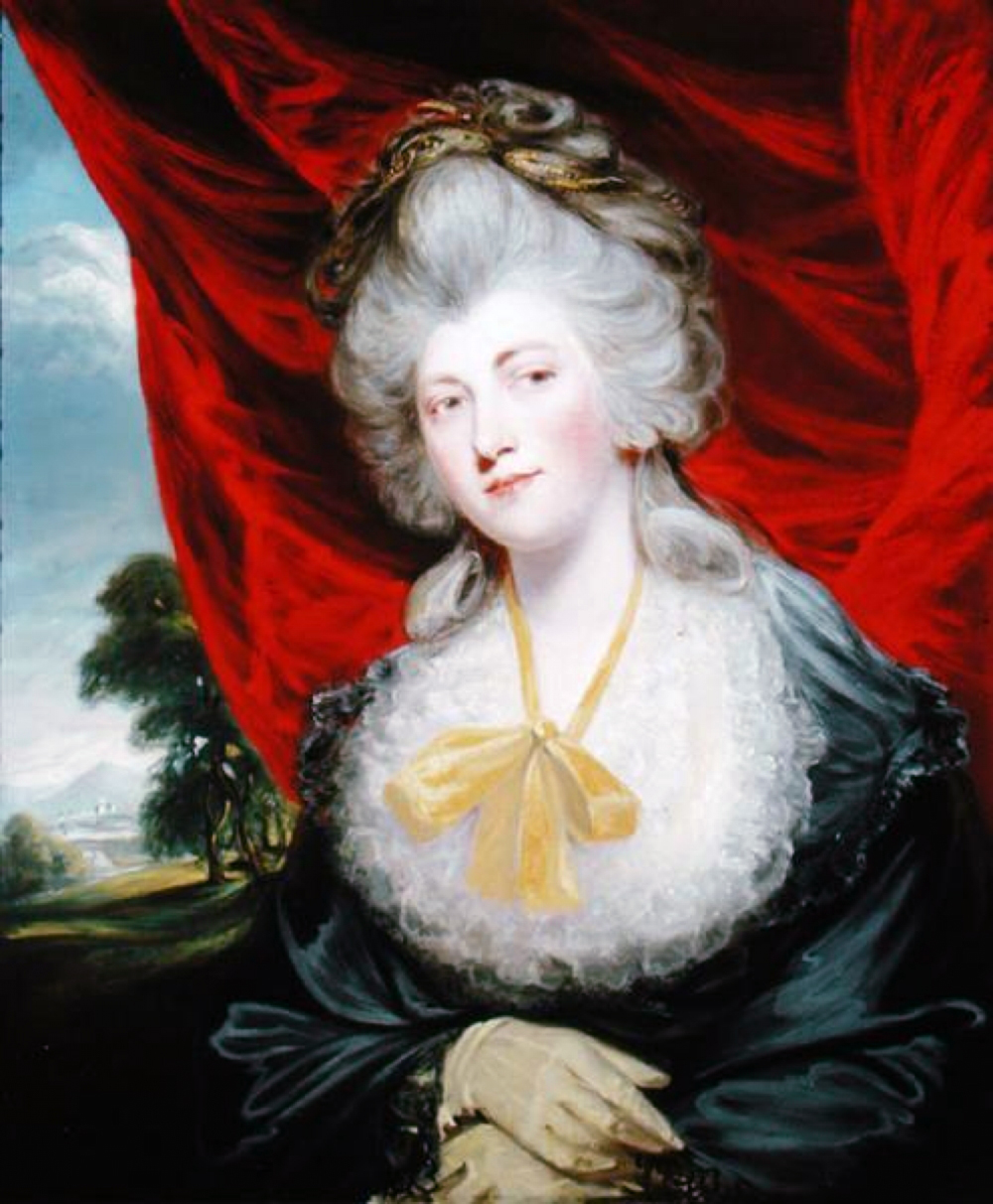
Isabella, née Ingram, Hertford's second wife, c. 1800

Lord Hertford married, firstly, the Hon. Alice Elizabeth Windsor, on 4 February 1768. After her death in 1772 he married, secondly, the Hon. Isabella Anne Ingram, daughter of Charles Ingram, 9th Viscount of Irvine and Frances Shepherd, on 20 May 1776. She was a mistress of George IV. On the death of his mother-in-law in 1807, he and his wife added the surname Ingram to their own, due to the fortune they inherited from her. Lord Hertford died in London in June 1822, aged 79, and was succeeded by his son from his second marriage, Francis. The Marchioness of Hertford died in April 1834.

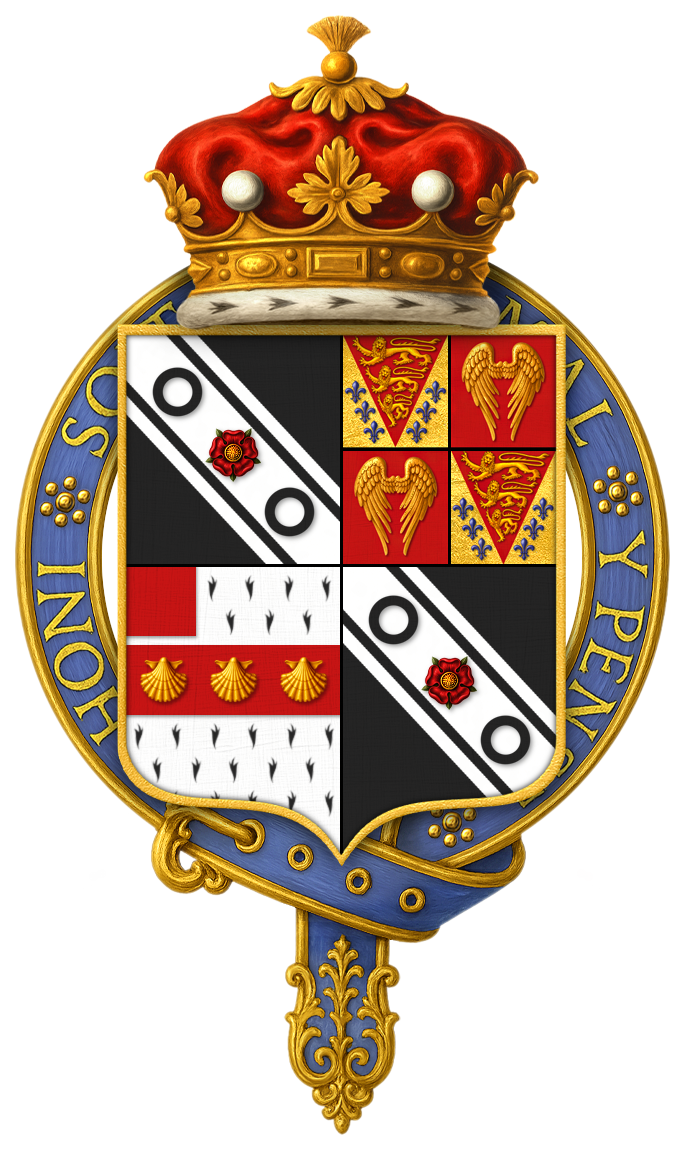
Arms of Seymour-Conway, Marquess of Hertford: Sable, on a bend cotised argent a rose gules between two annulets of the first (Conway); quartering: Quarterly, 1st and 4th: Or, on a pile gules between six fleurs-de-lys azure three lions of England (special grant to Edward Seymour, 1st Duke of Somerset, 1st Earl of Hertford (d.1552)); 2nd: Gules, two wings conjoined in lure or (Seymour); 3rd: Ermine on a fess Gules three escallops Or a canton Gules (Ingram)

=== Alice Seymour-Conway ===
Alice Seymour-Conway, Viscountess Beauchamp (10 May 1749 – 11 February 1772), formerly the Hon. Alice Elizabeth Windsor, was the first wife of the viscount. She was the second daughter and co-heiress of Herbert Windsor, 2nd Viscount Windsor, by his wife, the former Alice Clavering. She married Viscount Beauchamp, then MP for Lostwithiel, on 4 February 1768 in London. She died at the couple's house in Grosvenor Square, London, aged 22.

Parliament of Ireland
Preceded by Edward Smyth; Francis Price	Member of Parliament for Lisburn; 1761–1768; With: Francis Price	Succeeded by Francis Price; Marcus Paterson
Preceded by Henry Seymour Conway; Hugh Skeffington	Member of Parliament for County Antrim; 1768–1776; With: Viscount Dunluce	Succeeded by Henry Seymour-Conway; James Willson
Parliament of Great Britain
Preceded by James Edward Colleton; George Howard	Member of Parliament for Lostwithiel; 1766–1768; With: James Edward Colleton	Succeeded by Henry Cavendish; Charles Brett
Preceded by John Offley; Thomas Worsley	Member of Parliament for Orford; 1768–1794; With: Edward Colman 1768–71; Robert Seymour-Conway 1771–84; George Seymour-Conway 1784–90; Lord William Seymour-Conway 1790–94	Succeeded by Lord William Seymour-Conway; Lord Robert Seymour
Political offices
Preceded by Sir Charles Bunbury	Chief Secretary for Ireland; 1765–1766	Succeeded by Augustus Hervey
Preceded by Hans Stanley	Cofferer of the Household; 1780–1782	Office abolished
Preceded by The Earl of Chesterfield	Master of the Horse; 1804–1806	Succeeded by The Earl of Carnavon
Preceded by The Earl of Dartmouth	Lord Chamberlain of the Household; 1812–1821	Succeeded by The Duke of Montrose
Honorary titles
Preceded by The 2nd Earl of Warwick	Lord Lieutenant of Warwickshire; 1816–1822	Succeeded by The 3rd Earl of Warwick
Vacant Title last held by The Duke of Grafton	Vice-Admiral of Suffolk; 1822	Succeeded by The Marquess of Hertford
Peerage of Great Britain
Preceded by Francis Seymour-Conway	Marquess of Hertford; 1794–1822	Succeeded by Francis Seymour-Conway
