= James Trail =

Member of Parliament for Orford
- In office 7 July 1802 – 1 November 1806 Serving with Lord Robert Seymour
- Preceded by: Earl of Yarmouth
- Succeeded by: Lord Henry Moore

Personal details
- Born: 19 December 1745
- Died: 16 August 1808 (aged 62)
- Party: Tory
- Spouse: Clarissa Catherine Trail [née Porter] (m. 1798)
- Education: University of Glasgow; Middle Temple
- Occupation: Lawyer and politician

James Trail (19 December 1745 – 16 August 1808) was a British lawyer and Tory politician, serving as the Member of Parliament for Orford between 1802 and 1806. Orford was a pocket borough, where he was brought in by Francis Ingram-Seymour-Conway, 2nd Marquess of Hertford.

== Early life ==
Trail was a graduate of University of Glasgow before then going on to achieve an LLB at the Middle Temple.

== Personal life ==
His brother, Henry Trail, was also an MP. In 1798, he married Clarissa Catherine Trail (née Porter).
