= Countess of Hertford =

Countess of Hertford is a title given to the wife of the Earl of Hertford. Women who have held the title include:

- Isabel Marshal (1200–1240)
- Maud de Lacy, Countess of Hertford and Gloucester (1223-1289)
- Lady Katherine Grey (1540-1568)
- Frances Howard, Duchess of Richmond (1578-1639)
- Frances Seymour, Duchess of Somerset (1699–1754)
- Isabella Seymour-Conway, Countess of Hertford (1726-1782)
