= HMS Seymour (K563) =

Frigate of the Royal Navy

History

United States
- Name: unnamed (DE-98)
- Ordered: 10 January 1942
- Builder: Bethlehem-Hingham Shipyard, Hingham, Massachusetts
- Laid down: 1 September 1943
- Launched: 1 November 1943
- Completed: 23 December 1943
- Fate: Transferred to United Kingdom 23 December 1943
- Acquired: Returned by United Kingdom 5 January 1946
- Stricken: 25 February 1946
- Fate: Sold for scrapping 10 December 1946

United Kingdom
- Name: HMS Seymour (K563)
- Namesake: Lord Hugh Seymour (1759-1801), British naval officer who was commanding officer of HMS Leviathan at the Glorious First of June in 1794
- Acquired: 23 December 1943
- Commissioned: 23 December 1943
- Fate: Returned to United States 5 January 1946

General characteristics
- Displacement: 1,400 long tons (1,422 t)
- Length: 306 ft (93 m)
- Beam: 36.75 ft (11.2 m)
- Draught: 9 ft (2.7 m)
- Propulsion: Two Foster-Wheeler Express "D"-type water-tube boilers; GE 13,500 shp (10,070 kW) steam turbines and generators (9,200 kW); Electric motors for 12,000 shp (8,900 kW); Two shafts
- Speed: 24 knots (44 km/h)
- Range: 5,500 nautical miles (10,200 km) at 15 knots (28 km/h)
- Complement: 186
- Sensors & processing systems: SA & SL type radars; Type 144 series Asdic; MF Direction Finding antenna; HF Direction Finding Type FH 4 antenna
- Armament: 3 × 3 in (76 mm) /50 Mk.22 guns; 1 × twin Bofors 40 mm mount Mk.I; 7–16 × 20 mm Oerlikon guns; Mark 10 Hedgehog antisubmarine mortar; Depth charges; QF 2-pounder naval gun

The second HMS Seymour (K563) was a British Captain-class frigate of the Royal Navy in commission during World War II. Originally constructed as a United States Navy Buckley class destroyer escort, she served in the Royal Navy from 1943 to 1946.

== Construction and transfer ==
The ship was laid down as the unnamed U.S. Navy destroyer escort DE-98 by Bethlehem-Hingham Shipyard, Inc., in Hingham, Massachusetts, on 1 September 1943 and launched on 1 November 1943. She was transferred to the United Kingdom upon completion on 23 December 1943.

== Service history ==
Commissioned into service in the Royal Navy as the frigate HMS Seymour (K563) on 23 December 1943 simultaneously with her transfer, the ship served on patrol and escort duty for the remainder of World War II. She sank the German motor torpedo boat S-220 – an S-boat, known to the Allies as an "E-boat" – on 1 March 1945. The Royal Navy returned Seymour to the U.S. Navy on 5 January 1946.

== Disposal ==
The U.S. Navy struck Seymour from its Naval Vessel Register on 25 February 1946. She was sold on 10 December 1946 for scrapping.
