= George Campbell (Royal Navy officer) =

Royal Navy Admiral (1759–1821)

Admiral Sir George Campbell GCB
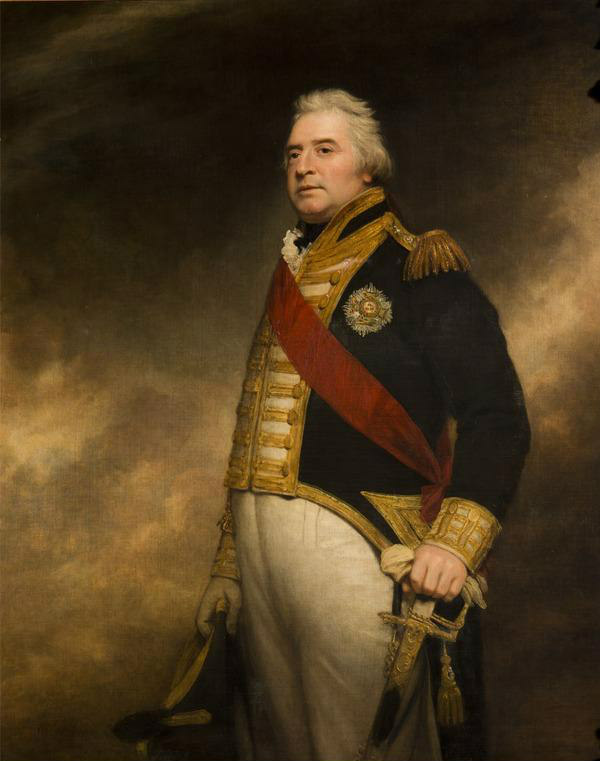
- Portrait by Sir William Beechey, 1818
- Born: 14 August 1759
- Died: 23 January 1821 (aged 61); Portsmouth
- Spouse: Eustacia Campbell-Hooke (m. 1805)
- Relatives: Pryse Campbell (father); John Campbell, 1st Baron Cawdor (brother)
- Military career
- Allegiance: United Kingdom
- Branch: Royal Navy
- Service years: 1771–1821
- Rank: Admiral
- Commands: HMS Sylph; HMS Aurora; HMS Orpheus; HMS Nymphe; HMS Leda; HMS Berwick; HMS Terrible; HMS Dragon; Downs Station; Portsmouth Command
- Conflicts: American Revolutionary War; French Revolutionary Wars; Battle of Genoa; Battle of the Hyères Islands; Napoleonic Wars
- Other work: Groom of the Bedchamber

Member of Parliament for Carmarthen
- In office 1806–1813
- Preceded by: Sir William Paxton
- Succeeded by: John Campbell

Admiral Sir George Campbell GCB (14 August 1759 – 23 January 1821) was a Royal Navy officer who went on to be Commander-in-Chief, Portsmouth.

== Naval career ==
Campbell joined the Royal Navy in 1771. He was given command of HMS Terrible and took part in the Battle of Genoa in 1795 during the French Revolutionary Wars; he subsequently commanded HMS Berwick. In 1802 he went to Jamaica where he commanded the squadron. He was appointed Commander-in-Chief, The Downs in 1808 and Commander-in-Chief, Portsmouth in 1818 and committed suicide in 1821 while still in that role. Campbell was a Groom of the Bedchamber from 1816 until his death.

In the summer of 1809 he served on the panel of judges at the Court-martial of James, Lord Gambier which assessed whether Admiral Lord Gambier had failed to support Captain Lord Cochrane at the Battle of Basque Roads in April 1809. Gambier was controversially cleared of all charges.

Parliament of the United Kingdom
Preceded by Sir William Paxton	Member of Parliament for Carmarthen; 1806–1813	Succeeded by John Frederick Campbell
Military offices
Preceded by Bartholomew Rowley	Commander-in-Chief, The Downs; 1808–1811	Succeeded by Sir Thomas Foley
Preceded by Sir Edward Thornbrough	Commander-in-Chief, Portsmouth; 1818–1821	Succeeded by Sir James Hawkins-Whitshed
