= Francis Seymour-Conway, 1st Marquess of Hertford =

British courtier and politician (1718–1794)

The Most Honourable The Marquess of Hertford KG PC PC (Ire)
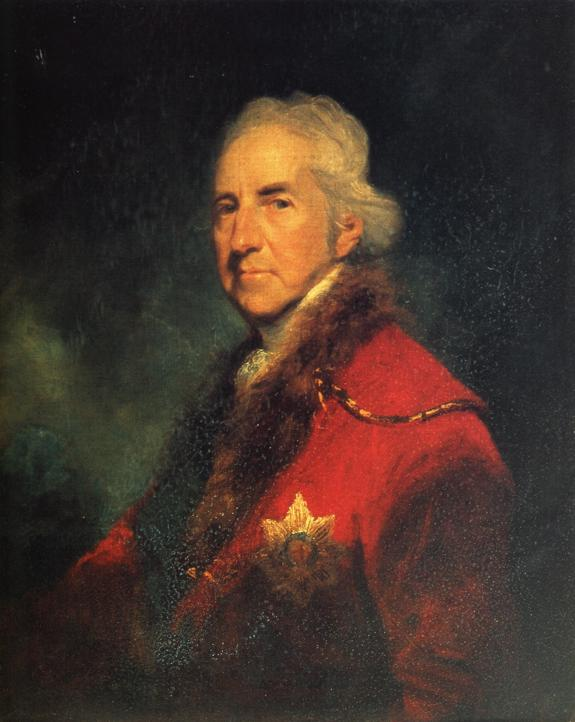
- 1785 portrait of Hertford by Joshua Reynolds

Lord Lieutenant of Ireland
- In office 7 August 1765 – October 1766
- Monarch: George III
- Preceded by: Thomas Thynne, 1st Marquess of Bath
- Succeeded by: George Hervey, 2nd Earl of Bristol

Personal details
- Born: Francis Seymour-Conway; 5 July 1718
- Died: 14 June 1794 (aged 75)
- Citizenship: British
- Spouse: Lady Isabella Fitzroy (m. 1741)
- Children: 13, including Francis, Henry, Robert, Hugh, and George
- Parent: Francis Seymour-Conway, 1st Baron Conway (father)

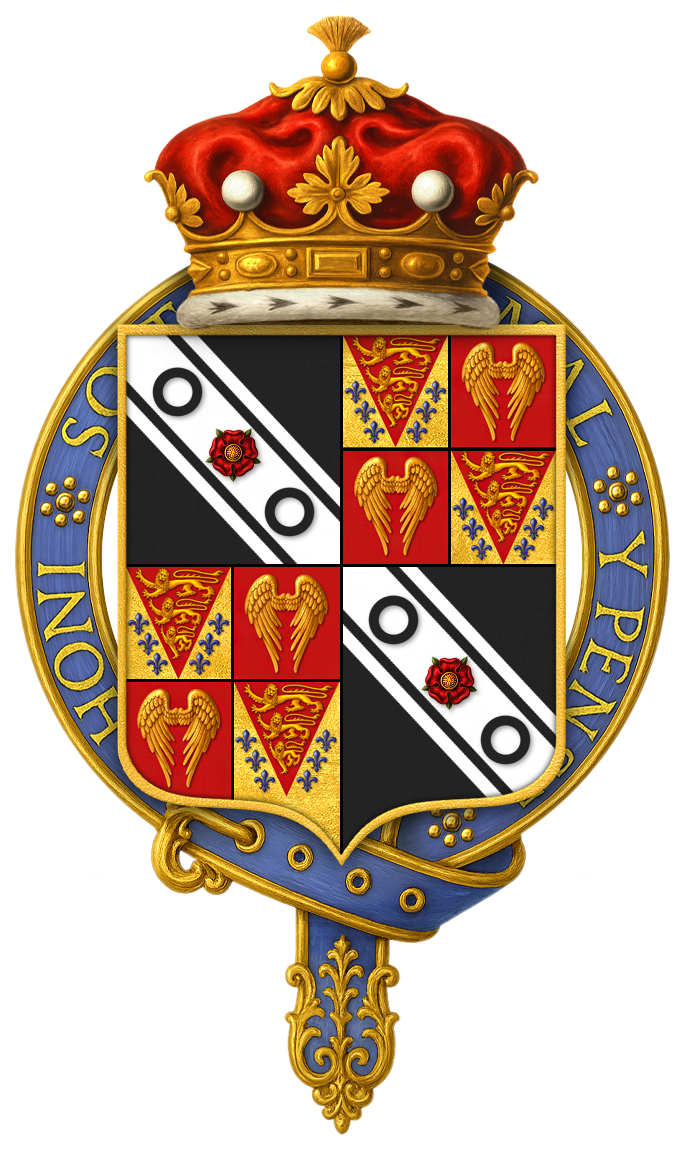
Quartered arms of Francis Seymour-Conway, 1st Marquess of Hertford: Sable, on a bend cotised argent a rose gules between two annulets of the first (Conway); quartering: Quarterly, 1st and 4th: Or, on a pile gules between six fleurs-de-lys azure three lions of England (special grant to Edward Seymour, 1st Duke of Somerset, 1st Earl of Hertford (d.1552)); 2nd and 3rd: Gules, two wings conjoined in lure or (Seymour)

Francis Seymour-Conway, 1st Marquess of Hertford (5 July 1718 – 14 June 1794) was a British courtier and politician who served as the Lord Lieutenant of Ireland in 1765.

== Background ==
Hertford was born in Chelsea, London, the son of Francis Seymour-Conway, 1st Baron Conway and Charlotte Shorter, daughter of John Shorter of Bybrook. He was a descendant of Edward Seymour, 1st Duke of Somerset and first cousin of Edward Seymour, 8th Duke of Somerset. He succeeded to the barony on the death of his father in 1732. The first few years after his father's death were spent in Italy and Paris. On his return to England, he took his seat, as 2nd Baron Conway, among the Peers in November 1739. Henry Seymour Conway, politician and soldier, was his younger brother.

== Political career ==
In August 1750 he was created Viscount Beauchamp and Earl of Hertford, both of which titles had earlier been created for and forfeited by his ancestor Edward Seymour, 1st Duke of Somerset, Lord Protector of England, following his attainder and execution in 1552. The Seymour family had inherited a moiety of the feudal barony of Hatch Beauchamp, in Somerset, by marriage to the heiress Cicely Beauchamp (d.1393). In 1755, according to Horace Walpole, 4th Earl of Orford, "The Earl of Hertford, a man of unblemished morals, but rather too gentle and cautious to combat so presumptuous a court, was named Ambassador to Paris". However, due to the demands of the French, the journey to Paris was suspended. From 1751 to 1766 he was Lord of the Bedchamber to George II and George III. In 1756 he was made a Knight of the Garter and, in 1757, Lord-Lieutenant and Guardian of the Rolls of the County of Warwick and City of Coventry.

From 1759 to 1765, Hertford's household included Edward Despard, serving his wife as a page. Despard was to hang in London in 1803 as the ringleader of an alleged republican plot against the King.

In 1763 Hertford became Privy Councillor and, from October 1763 to June 1765, was a successful ambassador in Paris. He appointed David Hume as his Secretary, who wrote of him, "I do not believe there is in the World a man of more probity & Humanity, endowd with a very good Understanding, and adornd with very elegant Manners & Behaviour". He witnessed the sad last months of Madame de Pompadour, whom he admired, and wrote a kindly epitaph for her.

In August 1765 he was appointed Lord Lieutenant of Ireland. In Dublin, leading representatives of the Protestant Ascendancy warmly anticipated his arrival. The Speaker of the Irish House of Commons, John Ponsonby, was satisfied that "the public as well as private character of Lord Hertford, together with the great property which he has in Ireland" were "the best securities which we can have for his good behaviour. There could not have been found a person to govern us who in all respects would be so likely to use us well . . .". But with his eldest son, Francis, Viscount Beauchamp, as his chief secretary, Hertford was in Ireland for just one parliamentary session (October 1765–June 1766). He hastened to return to his court circle in London where he was appointed Lord Chamberlain 1766–82 (and again April–December 1783).

In 1782, when she was only fifty-six, his wife died after having nursed their grandson at Forde's Farm, Thames Ditton, where she caught a violent cold. According to Walpole, "Lord Hertford's loss is beyond measure. She was not only the most affectionate wife, but the most useful one, and almost the only person I ever saw that never neglected or put off or forgot anything that was to be done. She was always proper, either in the highest life or in the most domestic." (Walpole visited Forde's Farm on several occasions from his residence at Strawberry Hill, Twickenham.) Within two years of the tragedy, Lord Hertford had sold Forde's Farm to Mrs Charlotte Boyle Walsingham, and a further two years later, she had re-developed the estate, building a new mansion which she called Boyle Farm, a name still in use today.

In July 1793 he was created Marquess of Hertford, with the subsidiary title of Earl of Yarmouth. He enjoyed this elevation for almost a year until his death at the age of seventy-six, on 14 June 1794, at the house of his daughter, the Countess of Lincoln. He died as the result of an infection following a minor injury he received while riding. He was buried at Arrow, in Warwickshire.

== Marriage ==
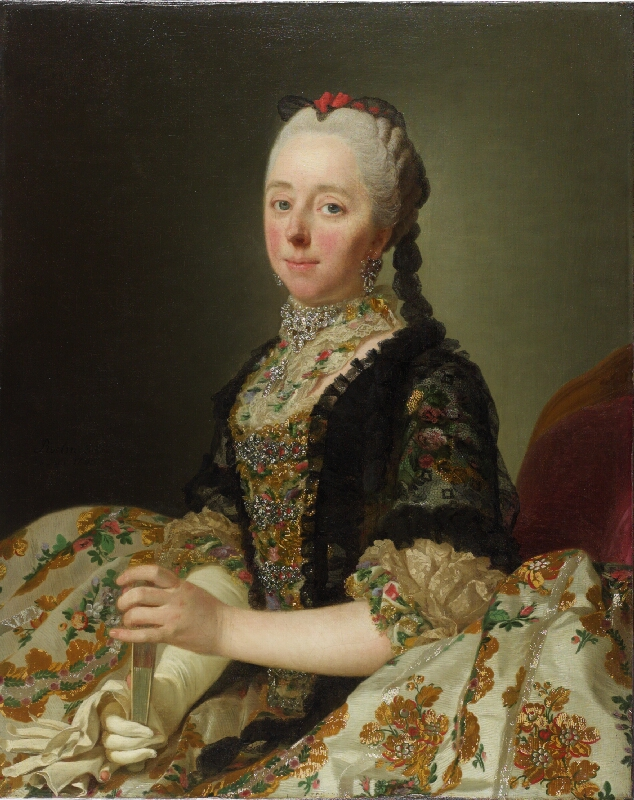
Isabella, Countess of Hertford by Alexander Roslin (1765) Hunterian Art Gallery, University of Glasgow

Lord Hertford married Lady Isabella Fitzroy, daughter of Charles FitzRoy, 2nd Duke of Grafton, on 29 May 1741. Her grandfather was Henry FitzRoy, 1st Duke of Grafton (1663–1690), an illegitimate son of King Charles II. By his wife he had thirteen children:

- Francis Seymour-Conway, 2nd Marquess of Hertford (12 February 1743 – 28 June 1822)
- Lady Anne Seymour-Conway (1 August 1744 – 4 November 1784), married Charles Moore, 1st Marquess of Drogheda
- Lord Henry Seymour-Conway (15 December 1746 – 5 February 1830)
- Lady Sarah Frances Seymour-Conway (27 September 1747 – 20 July 1770), married Robert Stewart, 1st Marquess of Londonderry
- Lord Robert Seymour-Conway (20 January 1748 – 23 November 1831)
- Lady Gertrude Seymour-Conway (9 October 1750 – September 1793), married George Mason-Villiers, 2nd Earl Grandison
- Lady Frances Seymour-Conway (4 December 1751 – 11 November 1820), married Henry Fiennes Pelham-Clinton, Earl of Lincoln, a son of Henry Fiennes Pelham-Clinton, 2nd Duke of Newcastle
- Rev. Hon. Edward Seymour-Conway (1752–1785), canon of Christ Church, Oxford, unmarried
- Lady Elizabeth Seymour-Conway (1754–1825) died unmarried
- Lady Isabella Rachel Seymour-Conway (25 December 1755 – 1825), married George Hatton, a member of parliament
- Admiral Lord Hugh Seymour (29 April 1759 – 11 September 1801), married Lady Anne Horatia Waldegrave, a daughter of James Waldegrave, 2nd Earl Waldegrave and his wife Maria Walpole (later wife of Prince William Henry, Duke of Gloucester and Edinburgh)
- Lord William Seymour-Conway (29 April 1759 – 31 January 1837)
- Lord George Seymour-Conway (21 July 1763 – 10 March 1848). He married Isabella Hamilton, granddaughter of James Hamilton, 7th Earl of Abercorn, and was the father of Sir George Hamilton Seymour, a British diplomatist

He is not known to have suffered himself from any mental abnormality, but a noted strain of eccentricity, even madness, appeared among his descendants: the debauched behaviour of his grandson, the 3rd Marquess, and the suicide of another grandson, Viscount Castlereagh, were both attributed to a strain of madness supposed to be hereditary in the Seymour Conway family.

Lord Hertford died in Surrey, England.

Diplomatic posts
Preceded by The Duke of Bedford	British Ambassador to France; 1763–1765	Succeeded by The Duke of Richmond
Honorary titles
Preceded by The Earl Brooke	Lord Lieutenant of Warwickshire; 1757–1794	Succeeded by The Earl of Warwick
Preceded by The Lord Clive	Lord Lieutenant of Montgomeryshire; 1775–1776	Succeeded by The Earl of Powis
Political offices
Preceded by The Viscount Weymouth	Lord Lieutenant of Ireland; 1765–1766	Succeeded by The Earl of Bristol
Preceded by The Duke of Rutland	Master of the Horse; 1766	Succeeded by The Duke of Ancaster and Kesteven
Preceded by The Duke of Portland	Lord Chamberlain; 1766–1782	Succeeded by The Duke of Manchester
Preceded by The Duke of Manchester	Lord Chamberlain; 1783	Succeeded by The Earl of Salisbury
Peerage of Great Britain
New creation	Marquess of Hertford; 1793–1794	Succeeded by Francis Seymour-Conway
New creation	Earl of Hertford; 1750–1794	Succeeded by Francis Seymour-Conway
Peerage of England
Preceded by Francis Seymour-Conway	Baron Conway; 1732–1794	Succeeded by Francis Seymour-Conway
Peerage of Ireland
Preceded by Francis Seymour-Conway	Baron Conway; 1732–1794	Succeeded by Francis Seymour-Conway
