= Jeanne Doucet de Surigny =

French miniaturist painter

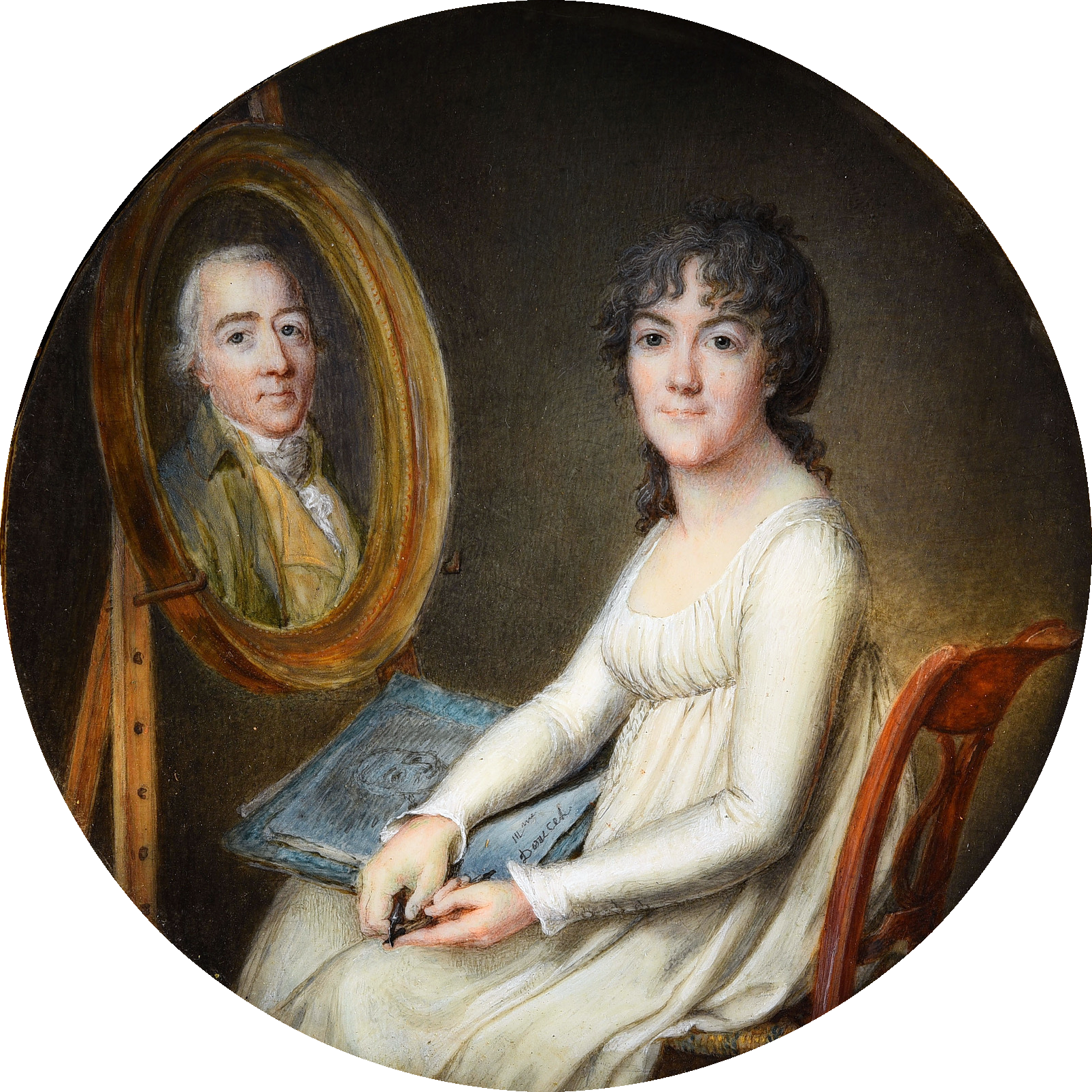

Jeanne Doucet de Surigny (née Glaesner; July 24, 1762, in Lyon – October 18, 1823, in Paris) was a French miniaturist painter best remembered for her exhibitions at the Paris Salon, and for her miniature portrait of Lord Robert Seymour's children. Some of her works are part of the collections of the Louvre Museum today.
