= Paxton's Tower =

Folly in Wales

Coordinates: 51.85183°N 4.1198°W

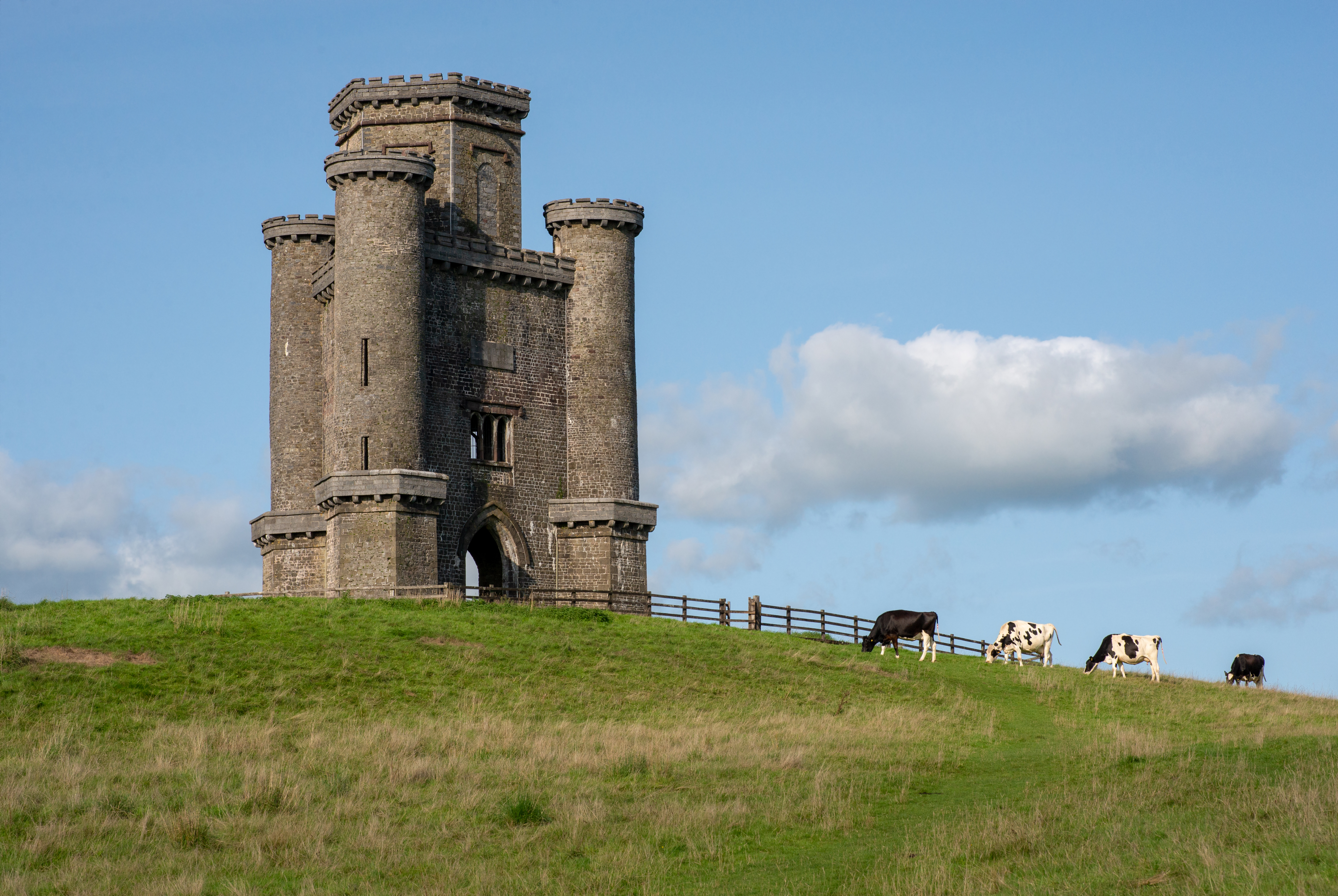
Paxton's Tower near Llanarthney

Paxton's Tower is a Neo-Gothic folly erected in honour of Lord Nelson. It is situated on the top of a hill near Llanarthney in the River Tywi valley in Carmarthenshire, Wales. It is a visitor attraction that can be combined with a visit to the nearby National Botanic Garden of Wales. Its high location provides views over the Botanic Gardens and the Tywi valley. The tower, a Grade II* listed building, is under the care of the National Trust. The surrounding parkland is registered at Grade II* on the Cadw/ICOMOS Register of Parks and Gardens of Special Historic Interest in Wales.

== History ==
The tower was built by Sir William Paxton (1745–1824), a Scottish-born and London-raised merchant and banker, whose forefathers were from Auchencrow by Paxton, Berwickshire. Paxton made his first fortune while with the East India Company in Calcutta with Charles Cockerell, brother of the architect. He purchased the Middleton Hall estate c 1790. The tower was built c 1806–1809. Paxton may have been inspired to build the tower by Nelson's death at Trafalgar. Whilst in the office of mayor of Carmarthen, he may have met Nelson in person. Marble tablets dedicating the tower to Nelson were located above the entrances to the tower.

Middleton Hall was designed by the architect, Samuel Pepys Cockerell (1754–1827) and was destroyed by fire in 1931.

== Construction ==
The tower is 36 feet high. The lower part of the tower is triangular in shape with a turret at each corner. On the first floor there is a banqueting room. Coloured glass from one of the windows can now be seen in the Carmarthen Museum at Abergwili. On the second floor there is a hexagonal prospect room surrounded by roof terraces. The windows to the prospect room are now bricked up. There is currently public access to the first floor banqueting room via stairs in one of the corner turrets.

== Pi ==
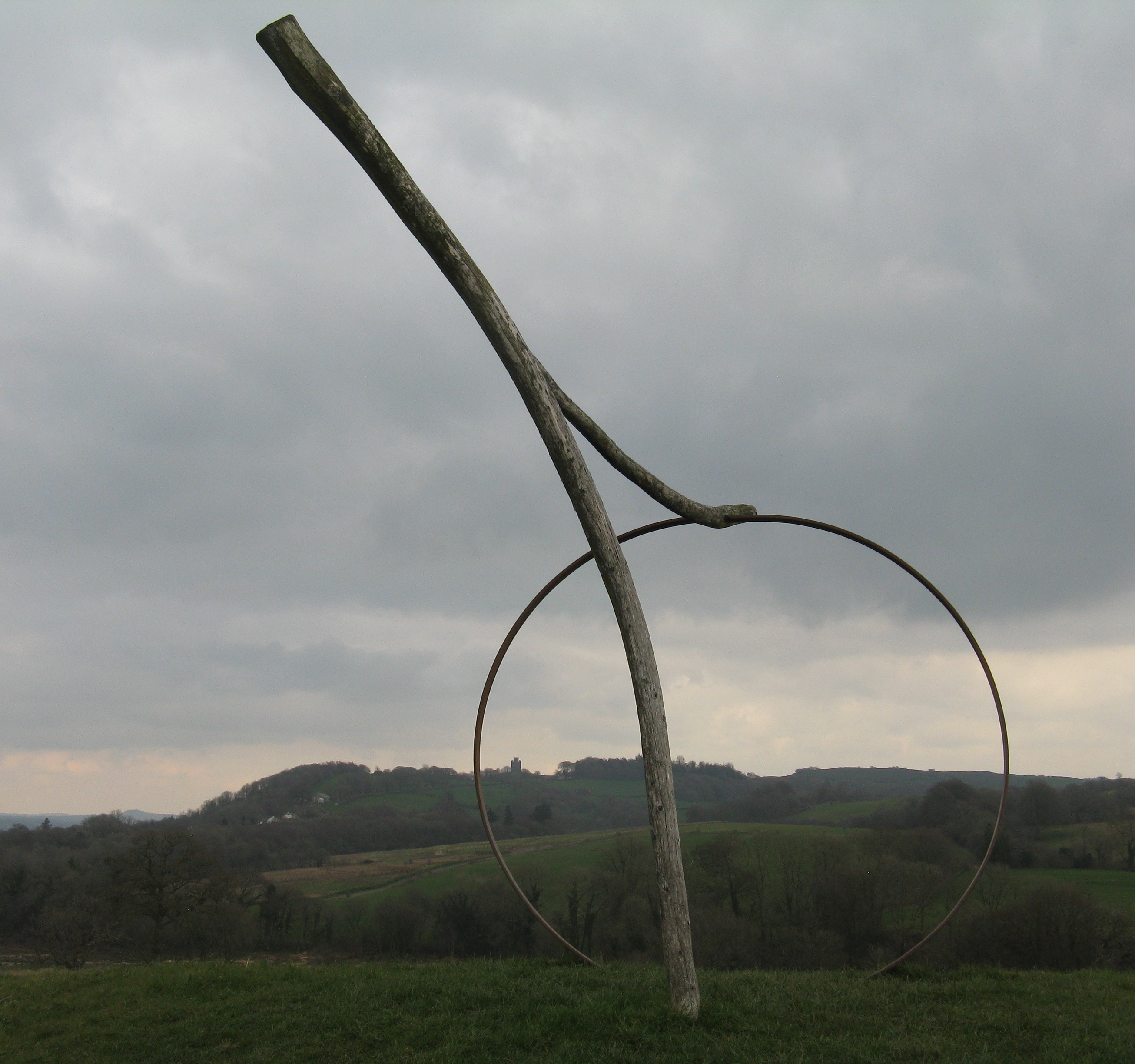
Pi in 2018

A piece of land at the nearby National Botanic Garden of Wales, named Paxton's View because of its views of the tower, features the sculpture Pi by Rawleigh Clay, which consists of a large metal hoop mounted by a twisted wooden structure. The hoop is designed so that it "frames" the view of Paxton's Tower, and as such has been described as a "viewing circle" for the tower.
