= Lord Hugh Seymour =

Royal Navy officer

Vice-Admiral Lord Hugh Seymour
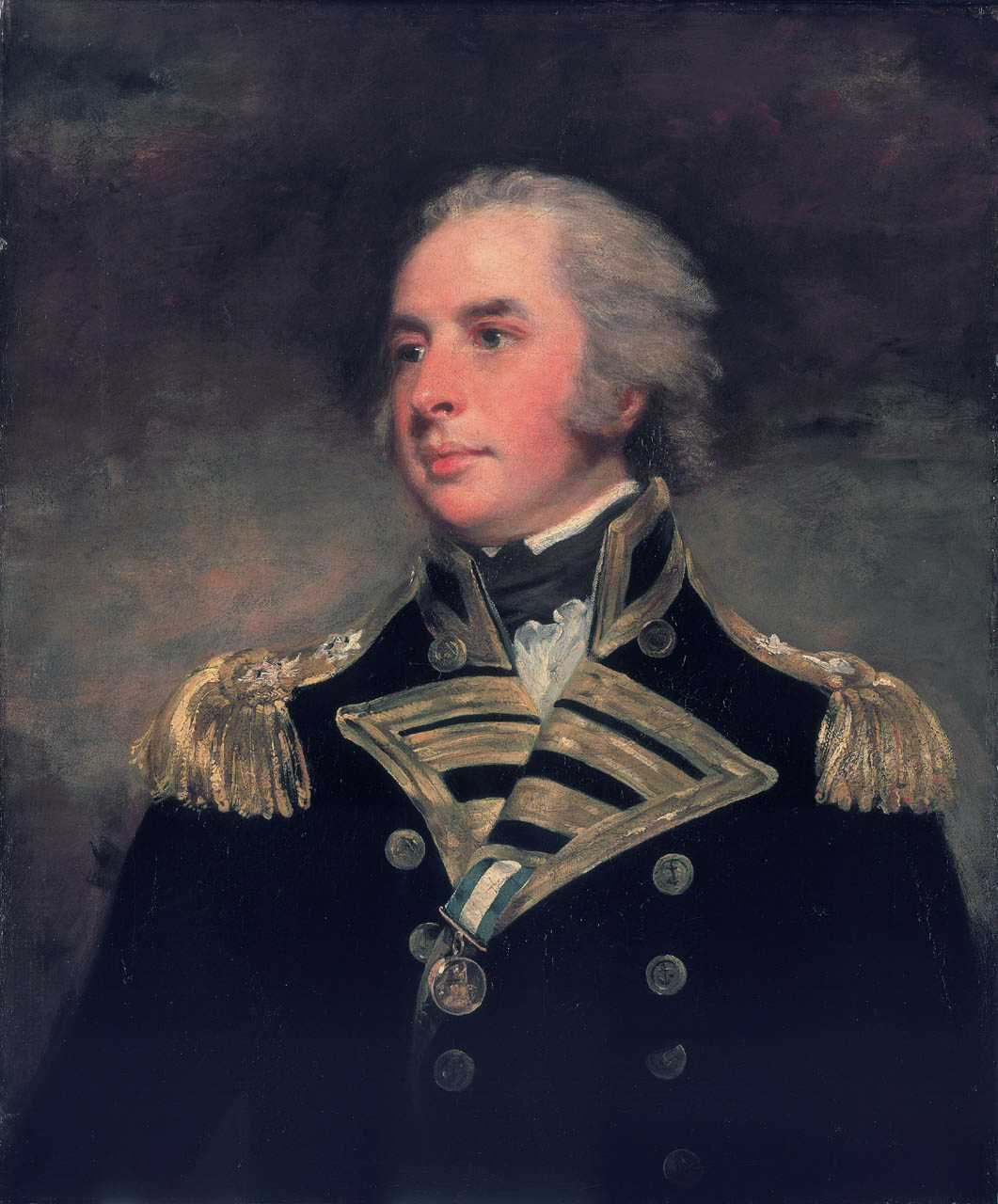
- 1799 portrait by John Hoppner
- Born: 29 April 1759; London, England
- Died: 11 September 1801 (aged 42); HMS Tisiphone, off Jamaica
- Military career
- Allegiance: Great Britain; United Kingdom
- Branch: Royal Navy
- Service years: 1770–1801
- Rank: Vice-Admiral
- Commands: HMS Diana; HMS Ambuscade; HMS Latona; HMS Canada; HMS Leviathan; HMS Sans Pareil; Leeward Islands Station; Jamaica Station
- Conflicts: American War of Independence; Great Siege of Gibraltar; French Revolutionary Wars; Siege of Toulon; Glorious First of June; Battle of Groix
- Other work: MP for Newport, Tregony, Wendover and Portsmouth

Vice-Admiral Lord Hugh Seymour (29 April 1759 – 11 September 1801) was a Royal Navy officer and politician who served in the American War of Independence and French Revolutionary Wars. The fifth son of Francis Seymour-Conway, 1st Marquess of Hertford, he became known for being both a prominent socialite and highly competent naval officer. In the final part of his career, he performed a period of shore duty on the Admiralty board.

Seymour maintained a reputation as a courageous and innovative officer: he was awarded a commemorative medal for his actions at the battle of the Glorious First of June and is credited with introducing epaulettes to Royal Navy uniforms as a method of indicating rank to non-English speaking allies. In his youth he formed close personal friendships with fellow naval officer John Willett Payne and the Prince of Wales, through association with whom he gained a reputation as a rake. His marriage in 1785, made at the insistence of his family as an antidote to his dissolution, was brought about through royal connections and proved very successful. During his lifetime he also held several seats as a member of parliament in the Parliament of Great Britain, although he did not pursue an active political career.

== Early career ==
Hugh Seymour was born in 1759 into one of the wealthiest families in England, as the fifth son of Francis Seymour-Conway, 1st Marquess of Hertford, and his wife Isabella Fitzroy (Hugh retained the surname "Seymour-Conway" until his father's death in 1794, at which point he shortened it to Seymour). He was initially educated at Bracken's Academy in Greenwich, where he met lifelong friend John Willett Payne, before joining the Navy at age 11 at his own insistence. Seymour became a captain's servant on the yacht William & Mary, and two years later moved to HMS Pearl under his relation Captain John Leveson-Gower, stationed off Newfoundland. After several short commissions, including service in the West Indies under George Rodney, Seymour was attached to HMS Alarm as a midshipman in the Mediterranean. Apart from a brief spell in HMS Trident, Seymour remained on her for several years, becoming a lieutenant in 1776. By 1776 the American Revolutionary War was underway, and Seymour continued in Alarm until he was made a commander in 1778, taking command of the xebec HMS Minorca.

In 1779, Seymour was promoted once more, making post captain in HMS Porcupine and serving in command of HMS Diana, HMS Ambuscade and HMS Latona, all in the Channel Fleet. The only major operation in which he participated during the period was the conclusion of the Great Siege of Gibraltar, when Latona was attached to Lord Howe's fleet that relieved the fortress. During this service, Seymour was repeatedly engaged in scouting the Franco-Spanish fleet in Algeciras, a task made difficult by bad weather and the erratic movements of the enemy. During much of the operation, Captain Roger Curtis was stationed aboard Latona to facilitate communicate between Howe and the Governor of Gibraltar. The effort to relieve and resupply the fortress was a complete success and Latona was sent back to Britain with dispatches, although Seymour remained in Gibraltar.

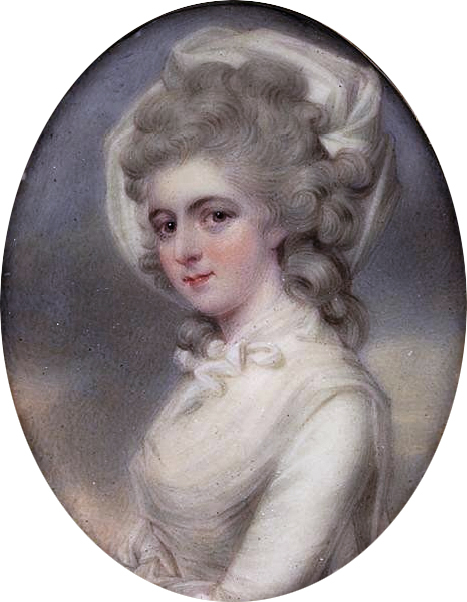
Lady Anne Horatia Seymour, née Waldegrave (1762–1801)

Following the Peace of Paris in 1783, Seymour took a house in London with his brother Lord George Seymour and John Willett Payne. The three men became notorious socialites, joining the Prince of Wales on many of his drinking exploits across London: Seymour remained close friends with Prince George for the rest of his life. Seymour, already known for his good looks, good manners, height and martial bearing, rapidly gained a reputation for dissolution. In 1785 however, Seymour married Lady Anne Horatia Waldegrave, daughter of Earl Waldegrave and Maria Walpole (later Duchess of Gloucester) at the insistence of his family in a successful attempt to curtail his social activities. It was at this time that Seymour made his first foray into politics, becoming MP for Newport on the Isle of Wight before relinquishing the post two years later. In 1788 he became MP for Tregony, but in 1790 he switched to become MP for Wendover. Seymour remained in this position until 1796 when he changed his seat to Portsmouth, in which he remained until his death. He did not serve as an active politician in any of these positions, preferring his navy career to his political one.

In May 1791 Hugh Seymour became president of the Hambledon Cricket Club, joining a band of like-minded Royal Navy Officers such as Captains Erasmus Gower, Robert Calder, Charles Powell Hamilton, Mark Robinson, Sir Hyde Parker and Robert Linzee.

== French Revolutionary Wars ==
In the Spanish armament of 1790, Seymour was called to service in command of the ship of the line HMS Canada, opening his commission with a cruise off the Isle of Wight. Passing through shallow water, Seymour ordered the use of a lead line to measure the depth ahead, but was accidentally struck in the head by the lead weight while soundings were being taken. Although little immediate damage seemed to have been caused, during the firing of a salute several days later Seymour suddenly suffered a severely adverse reaction and had to be taken ashore for emergency medical treatment. The head injury rendered him unable to endure any loud noises or bright lights and for the next three years he lived as an invalid at his country estate in Hambledon. Command of HMS Canada passed to Captain Sir Erasmus Gower, a lifelong friend. By 1793 Seymour was sufficiently recovered to return to service, and escorted Lord Hood to the Mediterranean in HMS Leviathan. There Hood led the occupation, defence and ultimate withdrawal from Toulon during the Republican siege of the city. Following the collapse of the city's defences, Seymour was sent back to England with dispatches but returned shortly afterward to convoy Leviathan back to Britain.

Transferred to the Channel Fleet, Leviathan was attached to service under Lord Howe and served with him during the Atlantic campaign of May 1794 alongside John Willett Payne, captain of HMS Russell. The campaign culminated in the Glorious First of June, when a French fleet was defeated by Howe's innovative tactics, but was ultimately successful in protecting a large grain convoy from the United States. Seymour's command of Leviathan was vitally important in the victory, the ship fighting at the initial engagement of 28 May and seeing extensive action during the battle itself. Seymour was one of only a few of Howe's commanders to successfully close with the French line, although he was unable to break through it. Leviathan then engaged closely with America, which she reduced to a battered wreck in a duel that lasted two hours. Leviathan was also badly damaged, having taken fire from Éole and Trajan during the fighting. At Howe's order, Seymour then left America (which was later captured) and joined the reformed fleet that held off a French counter-attack in the latter stages of the battle. In the aftermath of the action, Seymour was one of the captains marked out for praise, being presented with a medal commemorating his service during the engagement. Leviathan had suffered 11 killed and 32 wounded in the engagement.

In 1795, Seymour moved to the recently captured HMS Sans Pareil and soon became a rear-admiral, engaging the French at the Battle of Groix. During the action, Seymour managed to bring his ship to the head of the British line pursuing the French fleet and engaged the Formidable and Tigre. Both ships were captured in heavy fighting, and Sans Pareil suffered ten killed and two wounded during the exchange. In 1796, Seymour was employed in the search for the French fleet which attempted and failed to invade Ireland, but Sans Pareil was badly damaged in a collision with HMS Prince during the campaign and had to be decommissioned for extensive repairs. In April 1797, Seymour returned to sea with a small squadron of six ships searching the Eastern Atlantic for a Spanish treasure convoy. Although the convoy was eventually seized by a force sent by Lord St. Vincent, Seymour had covered over 5,000 miles in his fruitless search.

== Admiralty service and death ==
Seymour had joined the Admiralty in 1795, becoming a Lord of the Admiralty and participating in much of the work the Admiralty board performed between 1795 and 1798, interposing his periods on land with brief sea commissions. In 1799, Seymour became a vice-admiral and joined the squadron blockading Brest for the next year, being involved in a minor operation against Basque Roads.

In 1799 Seymour was sent to the West Indies as commander-in-chief of the Leeward Islands Station. In August he led the naval squadron in the capture of Surinam in his flagship Prince of Wales. Sometime after 3 May 1800 he went on to be commander-in-chief of the Jamaica Station.

However, in 1801 he fell ill, contracting Yellow Fever. He was sent to sea by his doctors in an attempt to regain his health but died aboard HMS Tisiphone in September 1801.

Seymour's body was taken from Jamaica on the morning of 17 September 1801, for return to Britain aboard HMS Pickle (originally a Bermudian-built merchant vessel named Sting) and joined that of his wife, who had died in Bristol a few days before her husband's death. His extensive estates were dispersed amongst his seven children, of whom six survived him:

- Adm. of the Flt. Sir George Seymour (1787–1870), father of the 5th Marquess of Hertford and a Princess (Laura, Princess Victor of Hohenlohe-Langenburg)
- Lt-Col. Hugh Henry John Seymour (1790–1821)
- Col. Sir Horace Beauchamp Seymour (1791 – 1851)
- William John Richard Seymour (1793–1801)
- Horatia Maria Frances Seymour (17 October 1795 – 26 August 1853), married John Philip Morier in 1814. They were grandparents of Walter Grimston and Algernon St Maur, 15th Duke of Somerset.
- Frederick Charles William Seymour (1 February 1797 – 7 December 1856), married Lady Mary Gordon (d. 13 June 1825), daughter of George Gordon, 9th Marquess of Huntly, on 15 April 1822, and Lady Augusta Hervey (d. 17 March 1880), daughter of Frederick Hervey, 1st Marquess of Bristol, on 18 September 1832, they had issue including:
  - Augusta Seymour, married Lord Charles Bruce
  - Charlotte Seymour, married John Spencer, 5th Earl Spencer
- Mary Georgiana Seymour (23 November 1798 – 30 October 1848), married George Dawson-Damer in 1825. They were the parents of Lionel Dawson-Damer, 4th Earl of Portarlington; grandparents of Hugh Fortescue, 4th Earl Fortescue, Seymour Fortescue, John Fortescue, Charles Granville Fortescue, Sir John Leslie, 2nd Baronet, and Theodosia Bagot; and great-grandparents of Michael Hicks Beach, Viscount Quenington.

Seymour's death was widely mourned among his contemporaries, Lord St. Vincent once describing him as "an excellent officer". His service had been energetic and characterised by innovation and invention: he developed a new system of fitting topmasts and was also credited with making epaulettes standard among Royal Navy officers, following his difficulties in convincing French Royalists at the siege of Toulon that he was a British officer, due to his unimpressive uniform.

== Legacy ==
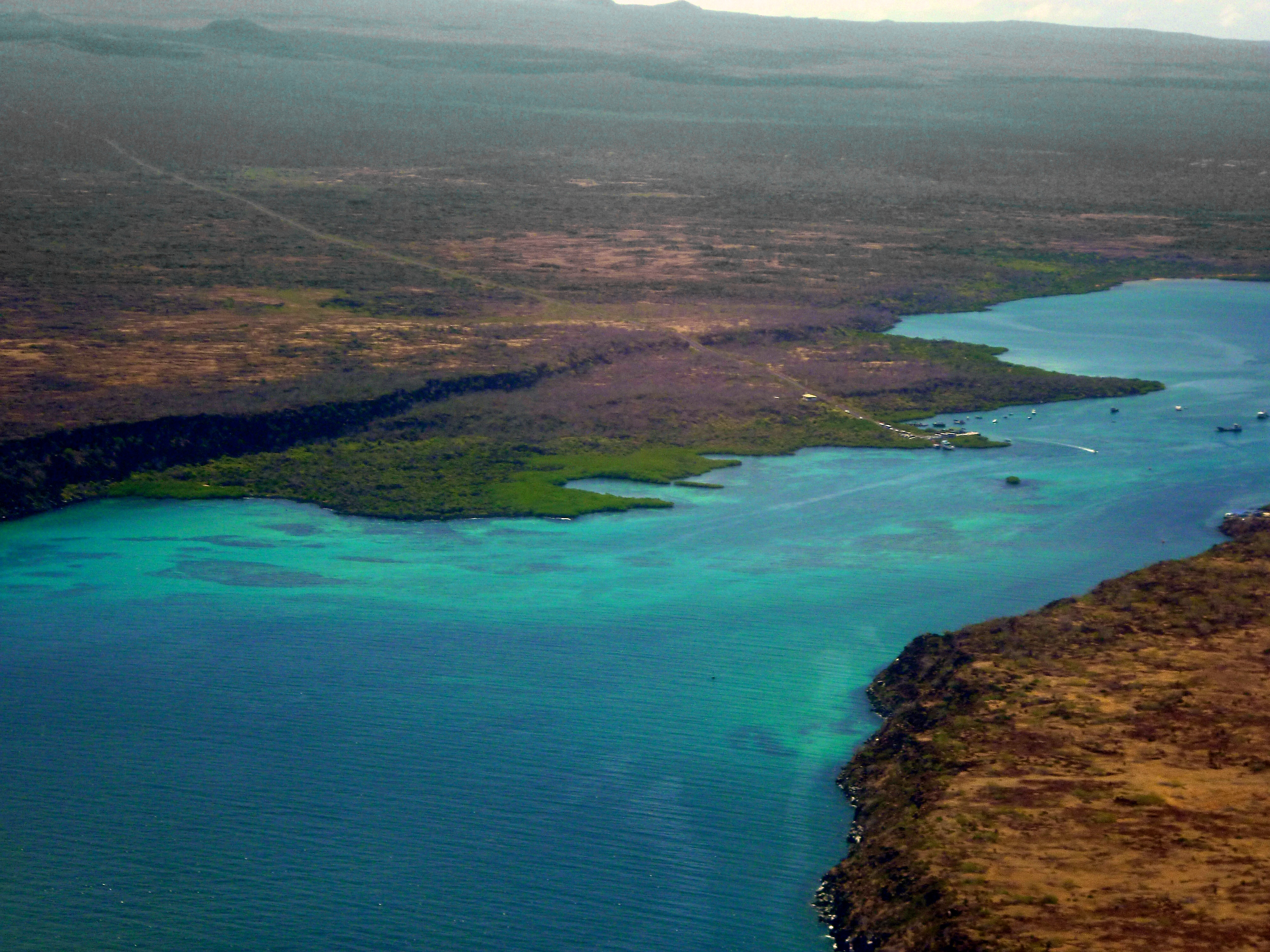
The view from an aircraft flying from Seymour Airport on Baltra Island (on the right), previously known as South Seymour Island, showing Santa Cruz on the left across the Itabaca Channel

The Royal Navy has named two ships after Seymour. The first HMS Seymour was a destroyer leader that was launched in 1916, saw service in World War I, and was sold in 1930. The second HMS Seymour (K563) was a frigate active from 1943 to 1946 that served during World War II.

North Seymour Island (Spanish: Isla Seymour Norte) in the Galápagos is named in his honour, the "north" distinguishing it from nearby Baltra Island, which was formerly known as South Seymour Island, also in his honour. The airport on Baltra is still named Seymour Airport and the pair of islands are still sometimes known as the Seymours or the Seymour Group.

Through his son, Horace, he is an ancestor of the late Diana, Princess of Wales.

== Ancestry ==
Ancestors of Lord Hugh Seymour

8. Sir Edward Seymour, 4th Baronet
4. Francis Seymour-Conway, 1st Baron Conway
9. Letitia Popham
2. Francis Seymour-Conway, 1st Marquess of Hertford
10. John Shorter
5. Charlotte Shorter
1. Lord Hugh Seymour
12. Henry FitzRoy, 1st Duke of Grafton
6. Charles FitzRoy, 2nd Duke of Grafton
13. Lady Isabella Bennet
3. Lady Isabella Fitzroy
14. Charles Somerset, Marquess of Worcester
7. Lady Henrietta Somerset
15. Rebecca Child

Parliament of Great Britain
Preceded by Sir Richard Worsley; John St. John	Member of Parliament for Newport, Isle of Wight; 1784–1786; With: Edward Rushworth	Succeeded by Edward Rushworth; Hon. John Townsend
Preceded by Robert Kingsmill; Lloyd Kenyon	Member of Parliament for Tregony; 1788–1790; With: Robert Kingsmill	Succeeded by John Stephenson; Matthew Montagu
Preceded by John Ord; Robert Burton	Member of Parliament for Wendover; 1790–1796; With: John Barker Church	Succeeded by John Hiley Addington; George Canning
Preceded by Hon. Thomas Erskine; Sir Henry Fetherstonhaugh, Bt	Member of Parliament for Portsmouth; 1796–1801; With: Hon. Thomas Erskine	Succeeded by Parliament of the United Kingdom
Parliament of the United Kingdom
Preceded by Parliament of Great Britain	Member of Parliament for Portsmouth; 1801; With: Hon. Thomas Erskine	Succeeded by Hon. Thomas Erskine; John Markham
Military offices
Preceded by Henry Harvey	Commander-in-Chief, Leeward Islands Station; 1799–1800	Succeeded by Sir John Duckworth
Preceded by Sir Hyde Parker	Commander-in-Chief, Jamaica Station; 1800–1801	Succeeded by Robert Montagu
