= French ship Diane =

Eleven ships of the French Navy have borne the name Diane in honour of Diana, goddess of the hunt, the moon, and nature in Roman mythology. In addition, two have borne the related name Diana:

== Ships named Diane ==
- Diane (1704), a 28-gun frigate.
- Diane (1706), a frigate.
- Diane (1707), a 42-gun ship of the line.
- Diane (1744), a 28-gun frigate.
- Diane (1779), a 32-gun Sybille-class frigate.
- Diane (1796), a 38-gun frigate.
- Diane (1808), a 22-gun Victorieuse-class corvette.
- Diane (1831), a Portuguese frigate, probably captured during the Battle of the Tagus.
- Diane (1916), a coastal submarine.
- Diane (NN4), a 630-ton submarine, lead ship of her class.
- Diane (S642), a Daphne-class submarine.

== Ships named Diana ==
- Diana (1810), the frigate Kenau Hasselaer, taken from the Dutch in 1810.
- Diana (1918), a yacht built in the United States in 1896 and taken into service as an auxiliary patrol boat in 1917 or 1918. She served in the French Navy until 1935.

== See also ==
- HMS Diana

== Bibliography ==
- Roche, Jean-Michel (2005). Dictionnaire des bâtiments de la flotte de guerre française de Colbert à nos jours. Vol. 1. Group Retozel-Maury Millau. p. 150. ISBN 978-2-9525917-0-6. OCLC 165892922.
- Roche, Jean-Michel (2005). Dictionnaire des bâtiments de la flotte de guerre française de Colbert à nos jours. Vol. 2. Group Retozel-Maury Millau. p. 169. ISBN 978-2-9525917-0-6. OCLC 165892922.
- Les bâtiments ayant porté le nom de Diane, netmarine.net
