= Isabella Seymour-Conway, Countess of Hertford =

British noble (1726–1782)

The Right Honourable The Countess of Hertford
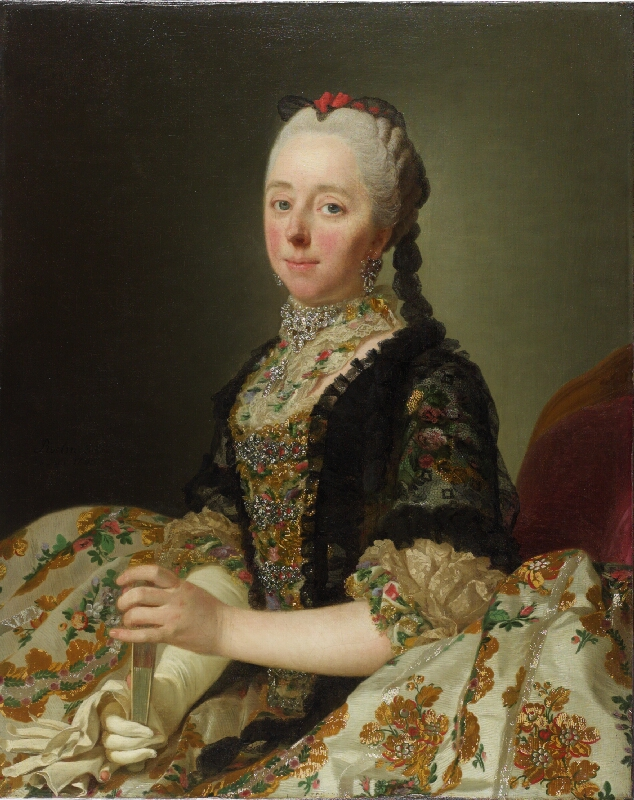
- Isabella, Countess of Hertford by Alexander Roslin (1765)
- Born: 1726
- Died: 10 October 1782 (aged 55–56)
- Spouse: Francis Seymour-Conway, 1st Marquess of Hertford
- Issue: Francis Ingram-Seymour-Conway, 2nd Marquess of Hertford; Anne Moore, Marchioness of Drogheda; Lord Henry Seymour; Sarah Stewart, Marchioness of Londonderry; Lord Robert Seymour; Gertrude Mason-Villiers, Countess Grandison; Frances Pelham-Clinton, Countess of Lincoln; Edward Seymour-Conway; Elizabeth Seymour-Conway; Isabella Rachel Seymour-Conway; Lord Hugh Seymour; Lord William Seymour-Conway; Lord George Seymour
- Father: Charles FitzRoy, 2nd Duke of Grafton
- Mother: Lady Henrietta Somerset

Isabella Seymour-Conway (née FitzRoy; 1726 – 10 November 1782), was the wife of Francis Seymour-Conway, 1st Marquess of Hertford.

She was the daughter of Charles FitzRoy, 2nd Duke of Grafton, and thus descended in the illegitimate line from King Charles II. Her mother was Henrietta FitzRoy, Duchess of Grafton, formerly Lady Henrietta Somerset.

She married Seymour-Conway on 29 May 1741, when he was still Baron Conway. Their children were:

- Francis Seymour-Conway, 2nd Marquess of Hertford (1743-1822)
- Lady Anne Seymour-Conway (1744-1784), who married Charles Moore, 1st Marquess of Drogheda, and had children, including Charles Moore, 2nd Marquess of Drogheda. They were also grandparents of Alexander Robert Stewart and Henry Moore, 3rd Marquess of Drogheda.
- Lord Henry Seymour-Conway (1746-1830)
- Lady Sarah Frances Seymour-Conway (27 September 1747 – 20 July 1770), who married Robert Stewart, 1st Marquess of Londonderry, and had children, including Robert Stewart, Viscount Castlereagh
- Lord Robert Seymour-Conway (1748-1831), who was married twice and had children
- Lady Gertrude Seymour-Conway (1750-1782), who married George Mason-Villiers, 2nd Earl Grandison, and had children. They were the maternal grandparents of Henry Villiers-Stuart, 1st Baron Stuart de Decies, and William Villiers-Stuart.
- Lady Frances Seymour-Conway (1751-1820), who married Henry Fiennes Pelham-Clinton, Earl of Lincoln, and had children. They were great-grandparents of Alfred Buckley, Duncombe Buckley, and Victor Buckley.
- Rev. Hon. Edward Seymour-Conway (1752–1785), canon of Christ Church, Oxford, who died unmarried
- Lady Elizabeth Seymour-Conway (1754–1825), who died unmarried
- Lady Isabella Rachel Seymour-Conway (1755-1825), who married George Hatton, MP, and had children
- Admiral Lord Hugh Seymour (29 April 1759 – 11 September 1801), who married Lady Anne Horatia Waldegrave, a daughter of James Waldegrave, 2nd Earl Waldegrave, and had children
- Lord William Seymour-Conway (1759-1837), who married Martha Clitherow and had children
- Lord George Seymour-Conway (1763-1848), who married Isabella Hamilton, granddaughter of James Hamilton, 7th Earl of Abercorn, and had children

She became a countess when her husband was created an earl in 1750. In the 1760s the earl was appointed Ambassador to France and was accompanied by his wife, whose portrait was painted in Paris by Alexander Roslin. The countess was an art collector and in 1759 was introduced to William Hunter, who remained a friend. Hunter was founder of the Hunterian Museum and Art Gallery, where her portrait now hangs. From 1768 until her death, the countess was a Lady of the Bedchamber to Charlotte of Mecklenburg-Strelitz, queen consort of King George III of the United Kingdom.

The earl and countess were the subject of at least two caricatures created by the political cartoonist James Gillray. One of these, "Dame rat, and her poor little ones", published in 1782, shows Isabella and her husband in the company of Charles James Fox. The other, "The Jubilee", shows the couple dancing around a gallows from which hangs a fox.

She died, aged 56, after a visit to their grandson at Forde's Farm, Thames Ditton, where she was taken ill. Horace Walpole, who was related to the earl and a correspondent of the countess, said, "Lord Hertford's loss is beyond measure. She was not only the most affectionate wife, but the most useful one, and almost the only person I ever saw that never neglected or put off or forgot anything that was to be done. She was always proper, either in the highest life or in the most domestic." It was after the countess's death that the earl was given the title Marquess of Hertford.

== Legacy ==
Through her son, Hugh, she is an ancestor of the late Diana, Princess of Wales.
