= HMS Diana =

Nine ships of the Royal Navy have borne the name HMS Diana after the figure from Roman mythology, whilst another was planned but later cancelled:

- HMS Diana (1757), a 32-gun fifth rate launched in 1757, commanded by Alexander Schomberg c. 1758/1759, and sold in 1793.
- HMS Diana (1775), a six gun schooner purchased in 1775 in North America, abandoned and burnt out later that year.
- HMS Diana (1794), a 38-gun fifth rate launched in 1794 and sold in 1815 to the Dutch Navy She was accidentally destroyed while in dry-dock on 16 January 1839.
- HMS Diana (1807), a 10-gun brig purchased in 1807 in the East Indies and condemned at Rodrigues in 1810.
- HMS Diana (1822), a 46-gun fifth rate launched in 1822, converted to harbour service in 1868 and broken up in 1874.
- HMS Diana (1836), an Indian wooden paddle vessel launched in 1836 and sold in 1846.
- HMS Diana (1895), an Eclipse-class second-class cruiser, launched in 1895 and sold in 1920.
- HMS Diana (H49), a D-class destroyer launched in 1932, sold to the Royal Canadian Navy and renamed HMCS Margaree in 1940, lost that year after a collision.
- HMS Diana, a planned Daring-class destroyer, ordered in 1945 and cancelled in 1946.
- HMS Diana (D126), a Daring-class destroyer, laid down as HMS Druid, but renamed in 1946 after the previously planned Diana was cancelled. She was launched in 1952, sold in 1969 to the Peruvian Navy and renamed Palacios. She was struck from their lists in 1993.

== See also ==
- Diana (1823), an East India Company wooden paddle vessel launched in 1823 and purchased in 1824. She was sold in 1826 to the Burmese government and broken up in 1836.
- French ship Diane
