= William Paxton (British businessman) =

Scottish-born sailor and businessman

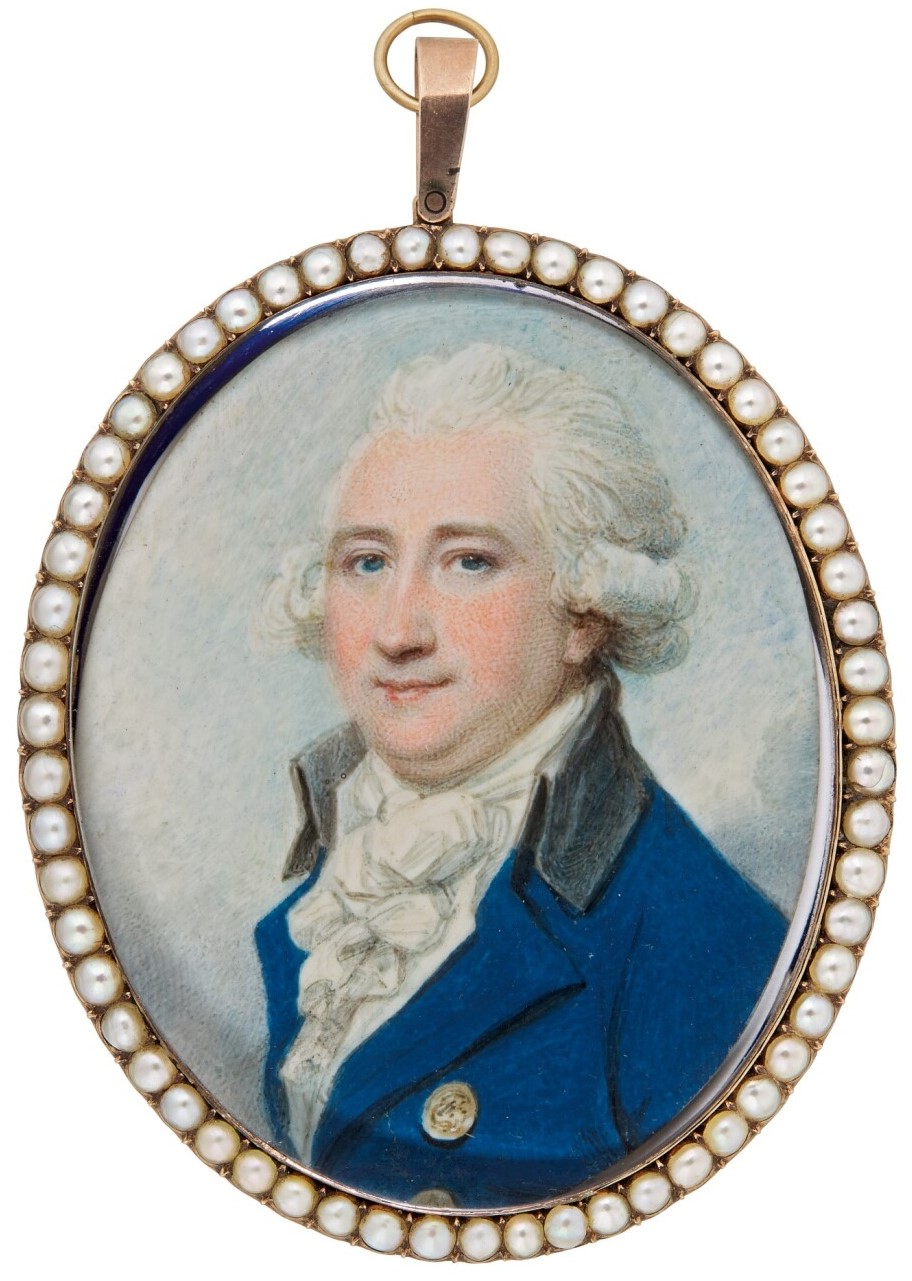
Sir William Paxton, miniature by William Wood, circa 1800.

Sir William Paxton (1744−1824) was a Scottish-born sailor, a businessman and the Welsh Member of Parliament for Carmarthen. He was instrumental in developing Tenby into a seaside resort.

== Early life ==
Paxton's family originated from Auchencrow near to Paxton, Berwickshire. He was the son of John Paxton, chief clerk to Scottish wine merchant Archibald Stewart, who had become Lord Provost of Edinburgh.

In 1745, when Charles Edward Stuart, "Bonnie Prince Charlie", marched down from Caledonian with his army of Highlanders to make his bid for the throne, Stewart feebly opposed him. Arrested and imprisoned in the Tower of London from where, after six weeks, he was released on a bail of £15,000. Two years later, he was found "not guilty" but Stewart found his name sullied in the eyes of the Edinburgh public and decided to transfer home and business to London. Stewart resultantly moved his business and his trusted agent John Paxton to No.11 Buckingham Street, just off the Strand, where the Paxton family lived in a flat on the upper floor.

His elder brother Archibald helped his father run the Stewart wine business. Stewart's son John had made his fortune in the East India Company, before becoming an MP. On his death, John and Archibald Paxton took over the Stewart wine business. His middle brother John became a painter and artist, whose works were displayed at the Royal Academy.

== Royal Navy career ==
John Stewart's connections into the EIC allowed William, aged 12, to join the Royal Navy as Captain William Gordon's captain's boy in November 1755, aboard HMS St Albans. This allowed the quiet but arithmetically skilled boy to be schooled further, and his ship saw action with the bombardment and capture of Louisburg (French Canada) in July 1757. In 1760 he joined the new HMS Thunderer as Midshipman officer, under Captain Charles Proby.

== Business career ==
=== East India Company ===
At the end of the Seven Years' War, like many military men, Paxton was technically made redundant from the Royal Navy. On 1 June 1764, Paxton walked from his family's London apartment to the Berkeley Square home of Robert Clive, 1st Baron Clive. Carrying a letter of recommendation written by John Stewart, he became a free mariner on an in-country privateer ship for the East India Company, plying trade between different ports on the east of the Cape of Good Hope and across Asia. After a period he was assigned to Calcutta, where he worked with Charles Cockerell, brother of the architect Samuel Pepys Cockerell.

=== Bengal Presidency Assayer ===
By 1772, John Stewart had been appointed within the administration of the Bengal Presidency, and was working with and had befriended Sir George Colebrooke, 2nd Baronet. The pair had speculated on shares in London, which Paxton had facilitated through his connections to allow them to undertake riskier trades, for which he took a small percentage on the sums placed. Unfortunately, Colebrooke's speculation had over stretched his finances, which would eventually bankrupt him, and Stewart was equally in financial trouble.

To enable him to repair his wealth, Stewart offered to sponsor Paxton to join the Bengal Presidency. As a result, Paxton returned to London and trained with Francis Spilsbury in Westminster. After seven months training, he passed his assay exams over four days in the Tower of London. Sponsored by Sir James Cockburn, former EIC Director and John Stewart's cousin, and William Brightwell Sumner, formerly a member of the Bengal Council; on 4 March 1774 Paxton became Assay Master to the Bengal Presidency under the governorship of Warren Hastings.

=== Master of the Mint, Bengal Presidency ===
Having been sounded out by Philip Francis on a plan of currency reform in 1776, in January 1778 he succeeded Charles Lloyd as Master of the Mint of Bengal.

This placed him in a very important position, as the official issuer of the Sicca "Silver" (freshly minted and assayed) rupee. British expatriates had come to India to make money to enable them to live a secure and ideally wealthy retirement back in the United Kingdom. But to do so they needed to make sure that their money was easily transferable back to London. Paxton could both assure them through the process of assay that their money was good, and then transfer the fresh Sicca rupees to bank accounts in London securely. For this private service, Paxton charged both an official fee for assay, and a percentage fee for transfer to London.

However, the EIC restricted the amount of money that could be transferred, by limiting the number and scale of the Bills of exchange. Further, there was far more money required to be repatriated to London, than was requested to be expatriated to India. However, Paxton developed other methods of money transfer which were not controlled by the EIC. Non-British companies trading into India needed to either transfer cash out with their goods, risking either loss through shipwreck or piracy; or arrange payment through assayed currency in country. Paxton developed relationships with these companies, particularly the Dutch in Chinsura, the French in Chandernagore, and the Danish in Serampore. This allowed them to ship goods into India, receive additional Sicca Rupees in payment in return for European Bills of Exchange, and then buy returned trade in an assured local currency. This allowed them to decrease or even stop their bullion imports from Europe, reducing risk and increasing profits.

With Dutch Bills of Exchange easily tradable in London, Paxton developed his closest relationships with them. From 1777 he began depositing large sums of Sicca Rupees in the Dutch treasury at Chinsura in exchange for Bills of Exchange on Amsterdam. This trade developed quickly, and in 1781 he agreed to supply one million Sicca Rupees, half of the Dutch company's Bengal investment in that trading season. These trades were a reflection of the trust he had developed with both the Dutch, his British expatriate clients with whose fortunes he was dealing, and the EIC.

=== Calcutta Agency House ===
As the influence and geography of the Bengal Presidency extended, so did its trade problems. Calcutta became the centre of Bengal Presidency, but now inland trade routes became long, and with inland piracy a risk alongside degradation of goods, and return home with cash, traders needed a new solution.

Paxton had the ability to create this new business, which became termed an Agency House:

- Paxton would take note from farmers and traders of what they had, which he would secure for them in Calcutta once the goods arrived; this enabled the trader to not have to travel the long distance to Calcutta
- Paxton would hold the goods until the market was at the highest point, or above a sum defined by the farmer. Once sold, these sums would be placed into the traders bank current account
- Paxton would often group separate trader's goods and sell in bulk to the shipping companies. This enabled him to directly gain Bills of Exchange in return for the required goods, without the need or cost for exchange into local currency
- Paxton now had access to a stream of European sourced Bills of Exchange, which were not regulated or hence controlled by the EIC

At each stage of the process, Paxton would charge a fee of between 1% and 5%, allowing him to amass a huge fortune. After he gained the contract to supply saltpetre (Potassium Nitrate) to the Danish, the EIC were so impressed and assured of his skills, they would themselves place orders for cotton and saltpetre with Paxton.

=== Paxton and Cockerell ===
However, the business that Paxton had created was not without its problems. The start of the Fourth Anglo-Dutch War in 1780, resulted in Governor General Hastings ordering that the Dutch settlement at Chinsura be taken in 1781. Once the British Army was in control, Paxton calculated that his clients had invested some 629,391 Sicca Rupees, which he had to recover.

As it was illegal and against company rules for administrators to trade with foreign powers, Paxton was in a weak position, even though he had key sponsors whom he had traded, across the company and up to board level. Although Hastings and his board recommended to London that Paxton and his clients be paid out of the liquidation of the Dutch colony's assets, which would take 12 months to realise, the London board were not enthused to openly approve an illegal operation. They advised Hastings that any administrators who were found to be undertaking such activity in the future would be instantly dismissed without any access to compensation.

Paxton moved to both protect his interests and distance himself from his Agency House business, while not giving up his interests or ability to conduct business. He formed a partnership with Charles Cockerell, with whom he would have a lifetime business relationship, into which he placed all assets and operations of his Indian businesses.

=== Voyage home ===
After the London EIC board agreed Hasting's plan, on 27 January 1785, Paxton asked permission to resign from his office as Master of the Mint, and to proceed to Europe. Up until then, his brother Archibald had represented the business in London, but Paxton had been made aware of how large the companies trade had become, and the necessity to have direct representation.

He advertised his personal assets in India for sale in the Calcutta Gazette that day, including three houses and eight horses; the normal level for a rich British expatriate in India at that time would have been one house and two horses.

Departing the Hughli in February 1785, he made the six-month journey with his six-year-old daughter, whose mother knew the relationship would only survive in India. Also travelling with Paxton was Welshman David Williams, a retiring Captain of the East India Company's military service. Paxton had arranged for Williams monies to be transferred to London via Bills of Exchange and diamonds, which Archibald had then encashed, placing some in an account to allow William's father to buy him a small estate in Henllys, Carmarthenshire. On landing in London, Williams and Paxton agreed that they would meet again soon in Wales.

However, Paxton immediately continued his voyage alone to Amsterdam. There with Dutch bankers Hope & Co., he encashed Bills of Exchange to the value of 470,241 Sicca Rupees, given him by the Dutch treasurer at Chinsura in 1781. Having already recovered 159,150, he returned to London to clear his client accounts and hence preserve his business.

=== Paxton, Cockerell, Trail & Co. ===
Returning to his room in the family home in Buckingham Street, Paxton established Paxton & Co. as the London-based agency for the Calcutta-based Agency House partnership. In the time he had taken to travel back to London, Charles Cockerell had added Philip Delisle to the partnership, renaming the agency Paxton, Cockerell & Delisle.

While the simple business of Paxton & Co. was to encash their client's monies being repatriated from India, Paxton's reputation allowed the company to quickly expand its services. While some simply wanted their monies placed into current accounts, or exchanged into other currencies; others trusted Paxton to trade and invest their funds in commodities, bonds, and the stock market. Making small fees on each transaction, Paxton & Co. quickly consolidated Paxton's personal fortune.

By the 1790s, the business had expanded again, with new partners joining in India under Cockerell. Cockerell hence came to London to introduce Paxton to their new fellow partners, the outcome of which was the establishment of the business formally as a merchant bank under the name Paxton, Cockerell, Trail & Co.

== Middleton Hall estate ==
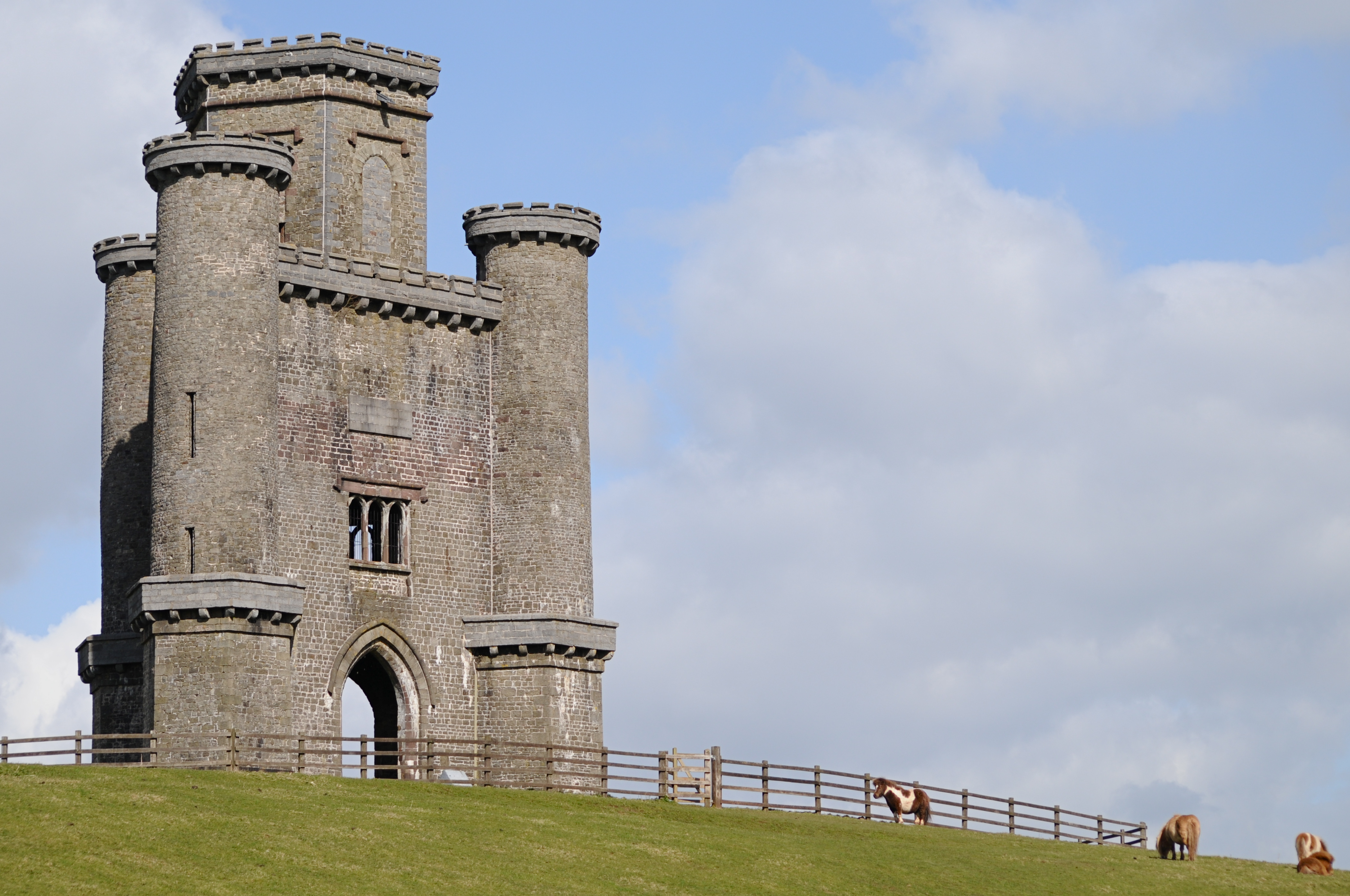
Paxton's Tower near Llanarthney in the River Tywi valley

In 1789, Paxton bought the Middleton Hall estate, in Carmarthenshire for about £40,000. Turning the original hall into Home Farm, he commissioned architect Samuel Pepys Cockerell to design him a new home, which was built between 1793 and 1795.

Paxton employed engineer James Grier as estate manager, and surveyor Samuel Lapidge, who had worked with Lancelot "Capability" Brown, to design and landscape the gardens. The pair created an ingenious water park, with water flowing around the estate via a system of interconnecting lakes, ponds and streams, linked by a network of dams, water sluices, bridges and cascades. Spring water was stored in elevated reservoirs that fed into a lead cistern on the mansion's roof, allowing Paxton's residence to enjoy piped running water and the very latest luxury, water closets. Middleton Estate was described in a 19th-century sale catalogue as "richly ornamented by nature, and greatly improved by art."

In 1806, Saxton engaged Pepys Cockerell again to design and then oversee the construction of Paxton's Tower, which was completed in 1809. A Neo-Gothic folly erected in honour of Lord Nelson, it is situated on the top of a hilltop near Llanarthney in the River Tywi valley.

By the time of his death in 1824, Middleton Hall estate covered some 2,650 acres (1,070 ha). The estate fell into decline in the early 20th century; the house was destroyed by fire in 1931. Today, the Middleton Hall estate is the site of the National Botanic Garden of Wales. The tower is under the care of the National Trust.

== Political and parliamentary career ==
=== Newark-on-Trent ===
In the 1790, Paxton stood as a Whig party candidate in the Newark-on-Trent constituency, to become junior to the Duke of Portland. Winning by 72 votes, his opponents contested the result, and finding that Paxton had spent far too prodigiously, he was dismissed.

Six years later he stood for the same constituency, but having arrived only 10 days before election day, withdrew on poll data obtained against his opponents Thomas Manners-Sutton and Colonel Mark Wood. Despite his efforts and renewed expenses, Paxton "declined giving further trouble" after hearing the results of the first day of the poll and withdrew.

=== Carmarthen ===
In 1793 Paxton was admitted as a Burgess to Carmarthen Borough. Now resident in West Wales, in the 1802 General Election he stood representing the Whig party in Carmarthenshire, against local Welsh Conservative James Hamlyn Williams. Inexperienced in electioneering but with lots of money, Paxton's accounts show that he bought voters: 11,070 breakfasts; 36,901 dinners; 25,275 gallons of ale; 11,068 bottles of spirits; and spent £768 on blue ribbons. The total bill amounted to £15,690.

Two months after losing the election by 46 votes, on 4 October 1802 he was elected Mayor of Carmarthen. Although he then returned to London at this point to deal with business matters, leaving daily operations to his Deputy Mayor, he took his duties seriously. Lobbying friends in Westminster, he enabled the act of Parliament that ensured installation to the town of pipes to distribute fresh water, and a second act of Parliament that started the Loyal Carmarthen Volunteers militia brigade. As a result, he was knighted in 1803. It is during his period as Mayor that in 1802 he met Lord Nelson in person, and hence may have been inspired to build Paxton's Tower folly after his death at the Battle of Trafalgar.

In 1803, standing MP John George Philipps resigned his seat in Parliament in favour of Paxton. At the 1806 General Election, Paxton took the Carmarthenshire seat unopposed. But in the run-up to the 1807 General Election, after much local opposition, he withdrew his candidacy, allowing Sir George Campbell to take the seat.

=== Carmarthenshire developer ===
After his withdrawal defeat in 1807, many would not have been surprised at Paxton's complete withdrawal from public life in West Wales. However, he continued his good works by becoming a key investor in many schemes, including:

- Llandeilo to Carmarthen toll road, south of the River Tywi
- Improvements to the harbour at Kidwelly, together with investments in the Kidwelly and Llanelly Canal that ran along the Gwendraeth valley, through Pembrey to Llanelli

=== Tenby ===
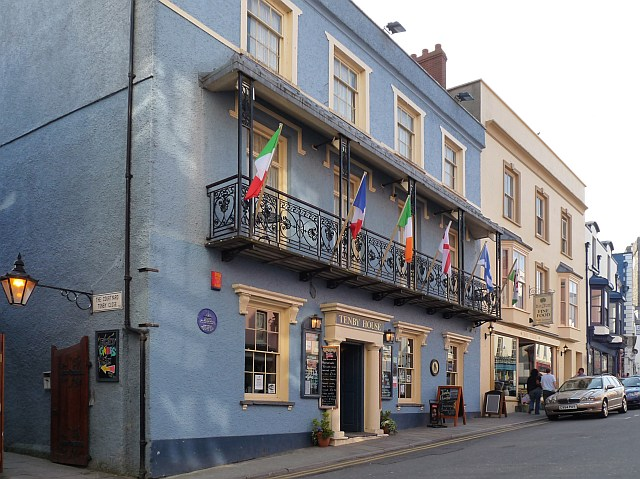
Tenby House, built by Sir William Paxton. Now a hotel, it has a Blue Plaque on the side in commemoration of his residency

His largest investment was in reviving the town of Tenby. A once thriving medieval seaport that had trade routes all over Europe, the English Civil War followed by a plague epidemic in 1650 had killed half its population. Resultantly bereft of trade, the town was abandoned by the merchants, and slid inexorably into decay and ruin. By the end of the eighteenth century, the visiting John Wesley noted: "Two-thirds of the old town is in ruins or has entirely vanished. Pigs roam among the abandoned houses and Tenby presents a dismal spectacle."

With the Napoleonic Wars restricting rich tourists from accessing the spa resorts in Europe, the need for home-based sea bathing grew. In 1802, Paxton bought his first property in the old town. From this point onwards he invested heavily in the town, with the full approval of the town council. Engaging the team who had built Middleton Hall, engineer Grier and architect Pepys Cockerell were briefed to create a "fashionable bathing establishment suitable for the highest society." His baths came into operation in July 1806, and after acquiring the Globe Inn transformed it into "a most lofty, elegant and convenient style" to lodge the more elegant visitors to his baths. Cottages were erected adjoining the baths, and livery stables with an adjoining coach house. In 1814 a road built on arches overlooking the harbour was built at Paxton's full expense. However, although he later got passed an act of Parliament to enable fresh water to be piped through the town, his 1809 theatre was closed in 1818 due to lack of patronage.

Paxton also took in "tour" developments in the area, as required by rich Victorian tourists. This included the discovery of a chalybeate spring at Middleton Hall, his Paxton's Tower in memorial to Lord Nelson, and coaching inns developed from Swansea to Narberth. Paxton's efforts to revive the town succeeded, and even when victory at the Battle of Trafalgar reopened Europe, the growth of Victorian Tenby was inevitable. Through both the Georgian and Victorian eras, Tenby was renowned as a health resort and centre for botanical and geological study.

== Personal life ==
A year after returning from India, in 1786, Paxton married Ann Dawney, the daughter of Thomas Dawney, a magistrate from Aylesbury who died when she was only six years old, Ann was 20 years younger than her new husband. The first of their ten children was born a year later, with Ann providing a step-mother to Paxton's existing daughter, Eliza.

After his withdrawal from the 1807 election, Paxton built himself a new seaside home at Tenby House, and then organised the rebuilding of the town as a Victorian seaside resort.

Aged 80, Paxton died in 1824 whilst in London on business, at his Piccadilly home. Paxton provided in an equal manner in his will for each of his five daughters and six sons, by instructing his executors to liquidate the major parts of his estate after his death; hence the Middleton Hall estate was immediately put up for sale. His wife Ann and eldest daughter Eliza were well provided for in a supplemental manner, and donations were made to several other members of the family and to a number of charitable institutions. He is buried in the catacombs at St Martin-in-the-Fields, while a Blue Plaque commemorates his residency on the side of Tenby House hotel. His wife Ann died in 1846.

Parliament of Great Britain
Preceded by John George Philipps	Member of Parliament for Carmarthenshire; 1803–1807	Succeeded by Sir George Campbell
