= Lord Henry Seymour (politician) =

British politician

Lord Henry Seymour (15 December 1746 – 5 February 1830) was a British politician, the second son of Francis Seymour-Conway, 1st Marquess of Hertford. He was known as Hon. Henry Seymour-Conway until 1793, when his father was created a marquess; he then became Lord Henry Seymour-Conway, but dropped the surname of Conway after his father's death in 1794.

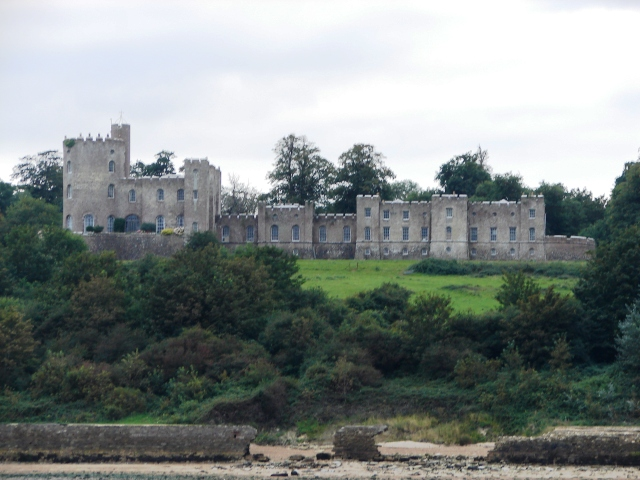
Norris Castle

Seymour-Conway was educated at Eton and Hertford College, Oxford, and took his MA from Merton College in 1767. He was first elected to the House of Commons in 1766 as Member for Coventry. He generally, though not always, voted with his uncle and namesake Henry Seymour Conway. After the 1768 election, when he and Andrew Archer defeated a challenge by Walter Waring, he was a consistent supporter of the Grafton and then the North governments.

Due to a falling-out between his father, the Earl of Hertford, and the Corporation of Coventry, Seymour-Conway did not stand as a candidate there at the 1774 election. He was instead returned by the North administration at Midhurst, which was a Treasury borough that year. In 1776, he was also returned to the Parliament of Ireland for County Antrim, which he represented until 1783. As his re-election in Midhurst did not appear to be sustainable in the 1780 election, he stood successfully at Downton. In the 1784 election, Seymour-Conway and Robert Shafto faced off against Hon. Edward Bouverie and William Scott, and, a double return being made, the case came before the House of Commons. Seymour-Conway chose not to stand in the ensuing by-election; his brother William took his place and won the by-election. During this period, he was for some time a captain in the Warwickshire Militia, and befriended the poet George Crabbe while quartered at Aldeburgh. On 11 February 1793, he was promoted major.

The election of 1784 marked Henry's retirement from politics. In 1790, he and his brother Robert were jointly granted, for life, the sinecures of joint prothonotary, clerk of the crown, filazer, and keeper of the declarations of the King's Bench in Ireland. By 1816, these offices brought an income of more than £10,000 a year (equivalent to £966,866 as of 2023). He was also craner and wharfinger of the Port of Dublin, a sinecure abolished in 1830.

He spent the rest of his life in the improvement of his estate at Norris Castle, in the Isle of Wight, where he experimented with the use of seaweed as a fertiliser. He had a reputation for both eccentricity and benevolence when he died, unmarried, in 1830. There is a memorial to him in St. Mildred's Church, Whippingham. He left Norris Castle to his youngest brother Lord George Seymour, who sold it to newspaperman Robert Bell in 1839.

Parliament of Ireland
Preceded by Viscount Dunluce; Viscount Beauchamp	Member of Parliament for County Antrim; 1776–1783; With: James Willson	Succeeded by James O'Neill; Hon. Hercules Rowley
Parliament of Great Britain
Preceded by James Hewitt; Hon. Andrew Archer	Member of Parliament for Coventry; 1766–1774; With: Hon. Andrew Archer 1766–1768; Sir Richard Glyn 1768–1773; Walter Waring 1773–1774	Succeeded by Walter Waring; Edward Roe Yeo
Preceded by Herbert Mackworth; Clement Tudway	Member of Parliament for Midhurst; 1774–1780; With: John Ord	Succeeded by Hon. John St John; Hon. Henry Drummond
Preceded by Sir Philip Hales; Robert Shafto	Member of Parliament for Downton; 1780–1784; With: Robert Shafto	Succeeded by Robert Shafto; Hon. William Seymour-Conway
