= Edward Colman (serjeant-at-arms) =

English army officer, politician and official

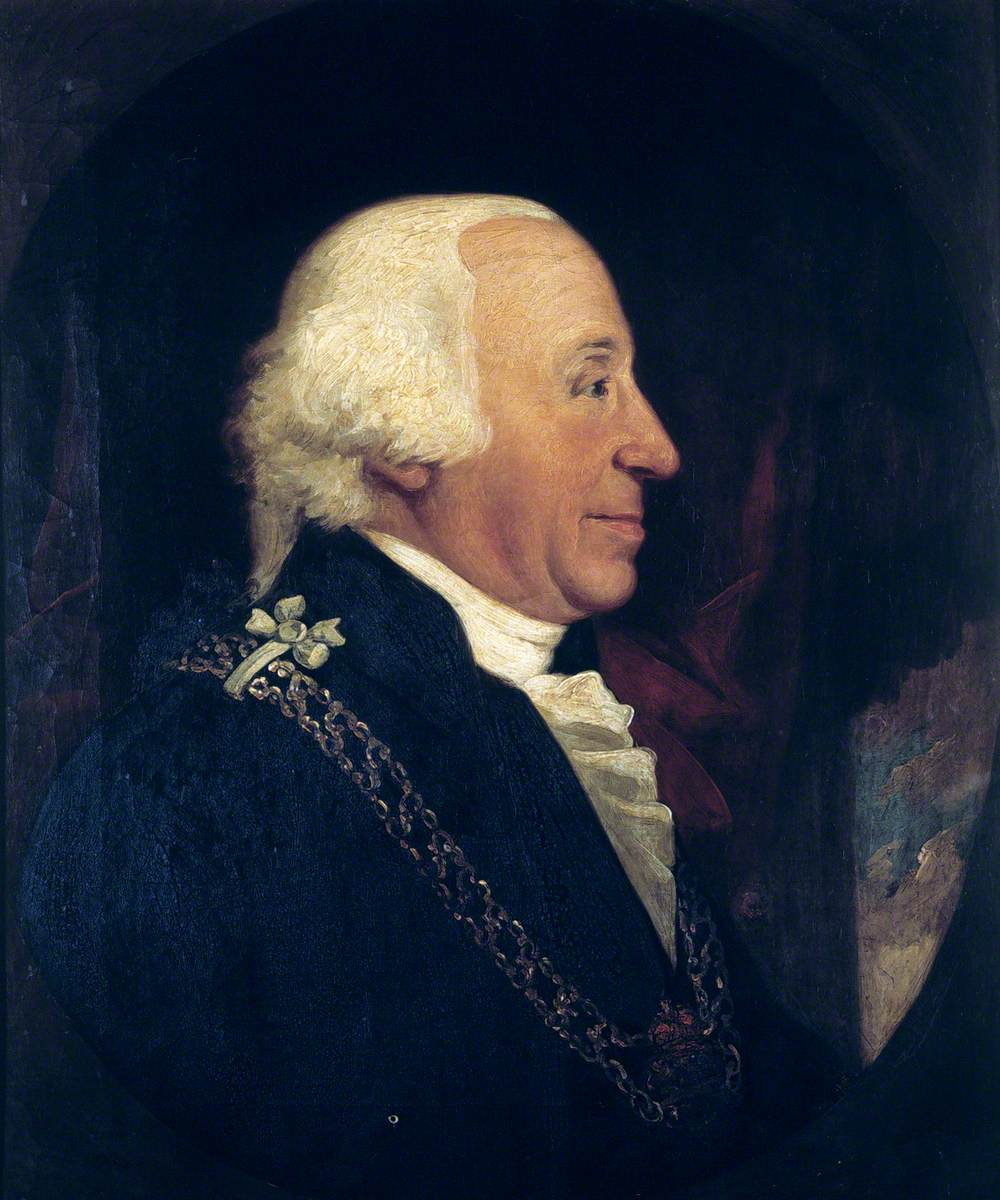
Edward Colman

Edward Colman (c. 1734–1815) was an English army officer, politician and official.

He was the son of William Colman of Gornhay, Tiverton, Devon. He joined the Army and rose to the rank of Major before retiring in 1775.

Colman was MP for Orford from 1768 to 1771. He was appointed Clerk of the robes and wardrobes (1770–1775), Gentleman usher of the privy chamber (1771–1775) and Serjeant-at-Arms of the British House of Commons (1775–1805). He was married, and had two sons and two daughters.

Government offices
| Preceded by Nicholas Bonfoy | Serjeant-at-Arms of the House of Commons; 1775–1805 | Succeeded by Francis John Colman |
