= Charles FitzRoy, 2nd Duke of Grafton =

British peer and politician

His Grace The Duke of Grafton KG PC FRS
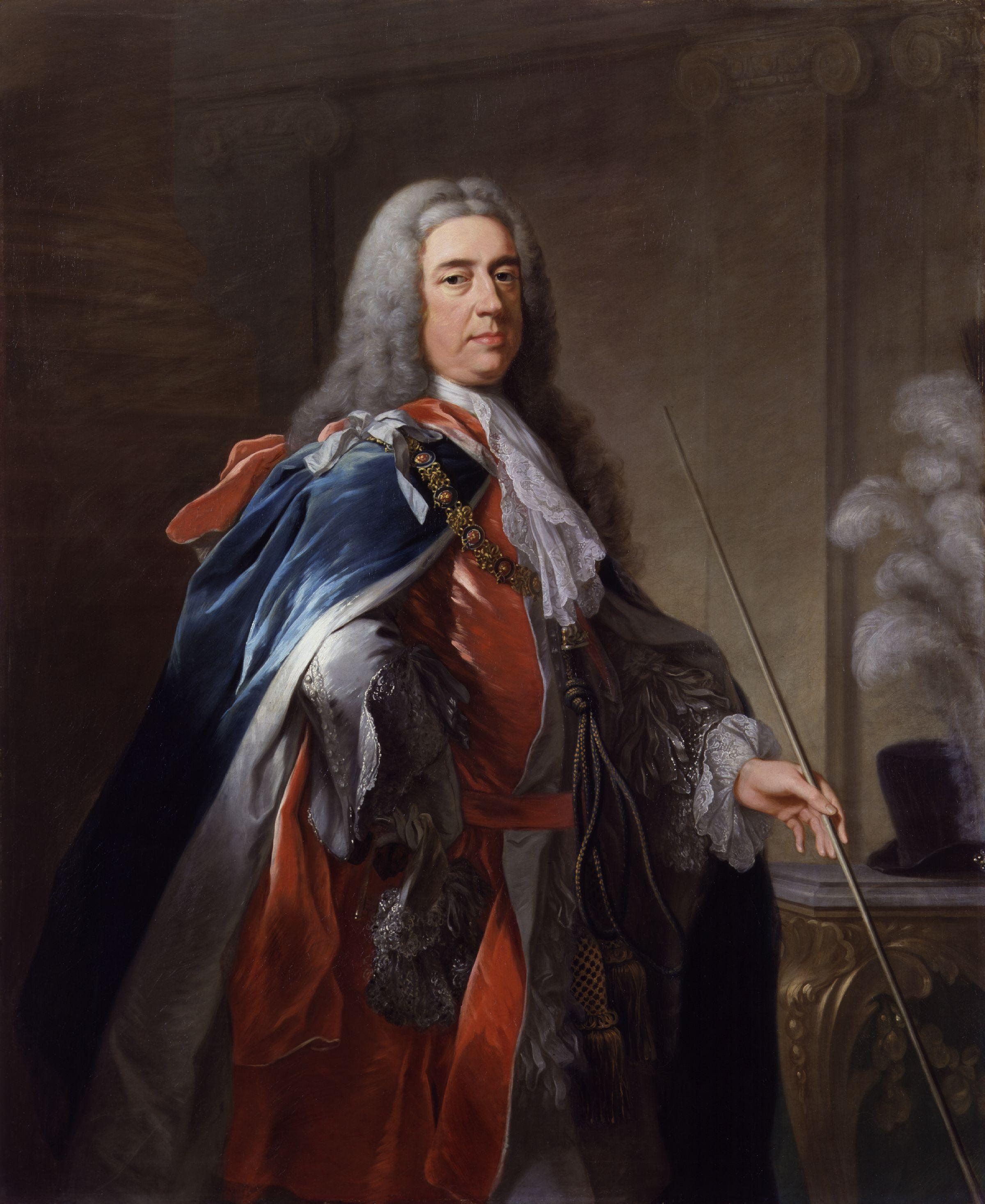
- Portrait by William Hoare

Lord High Steward for the coronation of King George I
- In office 19 October 1714 – 20 October 1714
- Monarch: George I
- Preceded by: The Duke of Devonshire
- Succeeded by: The Earl Cowper

Lord Lieutenant of Ireland
- In office 18 June 1720 – 6 May 1724
- Preceded by: The Duke of Bolton
- Succeeded by: The Lord Carteret

Personal details
- Born: 25 October 1683
- Died: 6 May 1757 (aged 73)
- Spouse: Lady Henrietta Somerset (m. 1713; died 1726)
- Children: Charles FitzRoy-Scudamore; Charles FitzRoy, Earl of Euston; George FitzRoy, Earl of Euston; Lord Augustus FitzRoy; Lord Charles FitzRoy; Caroline Stanhope, Countess of Harrington; Lady Harriet FitzRoy; Isabella Seymour-Conway, Countess of Hertford
- Parent(s): Henry FitzRoy, 1st Duke of Grafton; Isabella Bennet, 2nd Countess of Arlington

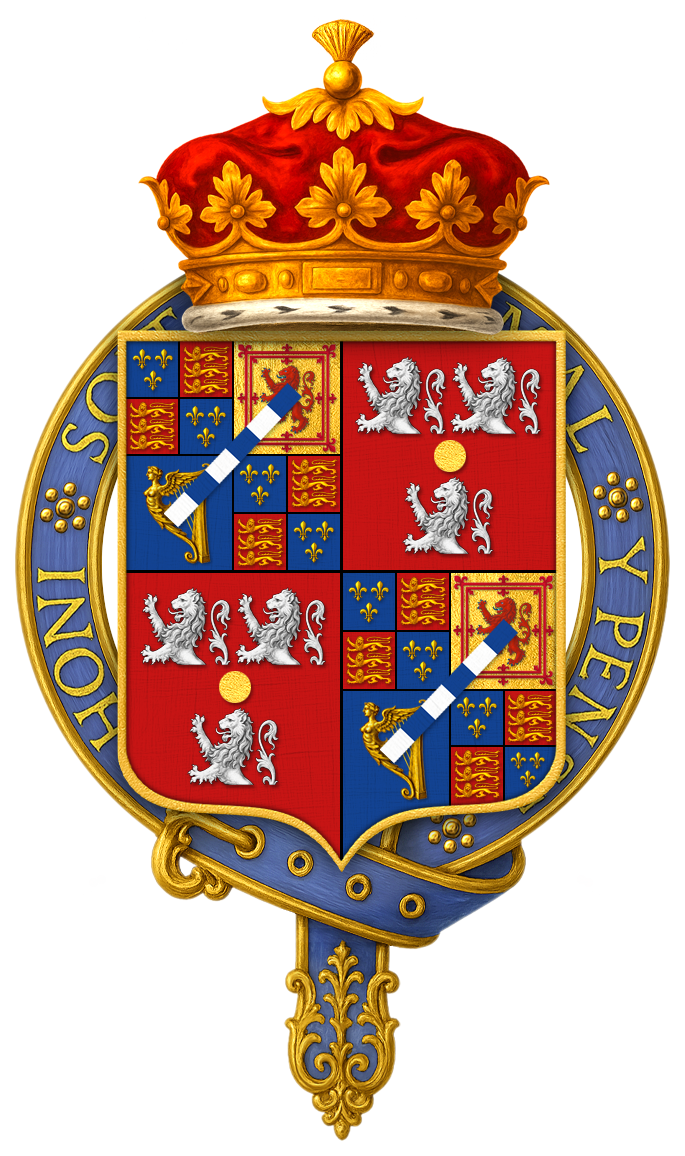
Quartered arms of Charles FitzRoy, 2nd Duke of Grafton, KG

Charles FitzRoy, 2nd Duke of Grafton (25 October 1683 – 6 May 1757) was a British peer and politician.

== Early life ==
He was the only child and heir of Henry FitzRoy, 1st Duke of Grafton (1663–1690) (an illegitimate son of King Charles II by his mistress Barbara Villiers) by his wife Isabella Bennet, 2nd Countess of Arlington, a great-granddaughter of William the Silent. He succeeded to his father's titles on 9 October 1690.

== Career ==
Grafton was one of the members of the Hanoverian-supporting Kit-Cat Club portrayed by Godfrey Kneller. He served as Lord High Steward at King George I's coronation, becoming a Privy Counsellor in 1715 and a Knight of the Garter in 1721. He also served as Lord Lieutenant of Ireland from 1720 to 1724 and Lord Chamberlain from 1724 until his death. In 1719 he was one of the main subscribers to the Royal Academy of Music, a corporation that produced baroque opera on the stage. In 1739 he supported the creation of what was to become one of London's most notable charities, the Foundling Hospital. He sat on that charity's original Court of Governors with such fellow Governors as John Russell, 4th Duke of Bedford, Vere Beauclerk, 1st Baron Vere of Hanworth, and Micajah Perry, a Lord Mayor of London. He was affectionately known to the Royal court as 'Booby Grafton'. For a number of years he and Princess Emily, one of George II's daughters, enjoyed a semi-flirtatious relationship.

== Marriage and children ==
On 30 April 1713, he married Lady Henrietta Somerset (27 August 1690 – 7 August 1726), daughter of Charles Somerset, Marquess of Worcester and Rebecca Child. They had seven children:

- Charles Henry FitzRoy, Earl of Euston (13 April 1714 – 18 December 1715)
- George FitzRoy, Earl of Euston (24 August 1715 – 7 July 1747). He was married on 10 October 1741 to Lady Dorothy Boyle (14 May 1724 – 2 May 1742) elder daughter of Richard Boyle, 4th Earl of Cork, 3rd Earl of Burlington, and his wife Lady Dorothy Savile, daughter of William Savile, 2nd Marquess of Halifax. The Earl was notorious for mistreating his wife—who died seven months after their marriage—and died childless.
- Lord Augustus FitzRoy (16 October 1716 – 24 May 1741). He was married to Elizabeth Cosby, daughter of Colonel William Cosby, who served as a colonial Governor of New York. They were parents to two sons, who founded branches of the family that still continue today:
  - Augustus FitzRoy, 3rd Duke of Grafton
  - Charles FitzRoy, 1st Baron Southampton
- Lord Charles FitzRoy (23 April 1718 – 29 July 1739)
- Lady Caroline FitzRoy (8 April 1722 – 26 June 1784). She married William Stanhope, 2nd Earl of Harrington. They were parents to Isabella Molyneux, Countess of Sefton, Charles Stanhope, 3rd Earl of Harrington and five other children.
- Lady Harriet FitzRoy (8 June 1723 – August 1735)
- Lady Isabella FitzRoy (1726 – 10 November 1782). She married Francis Seymour-Conway, 1st Marquess of Hertford. They were parents to Francis Seymour-Conway, 2nd Marquess of Hertford and eleven other children.

The Duke also fathered an illegitimate son, Charles FitzRoy-Scudamore.

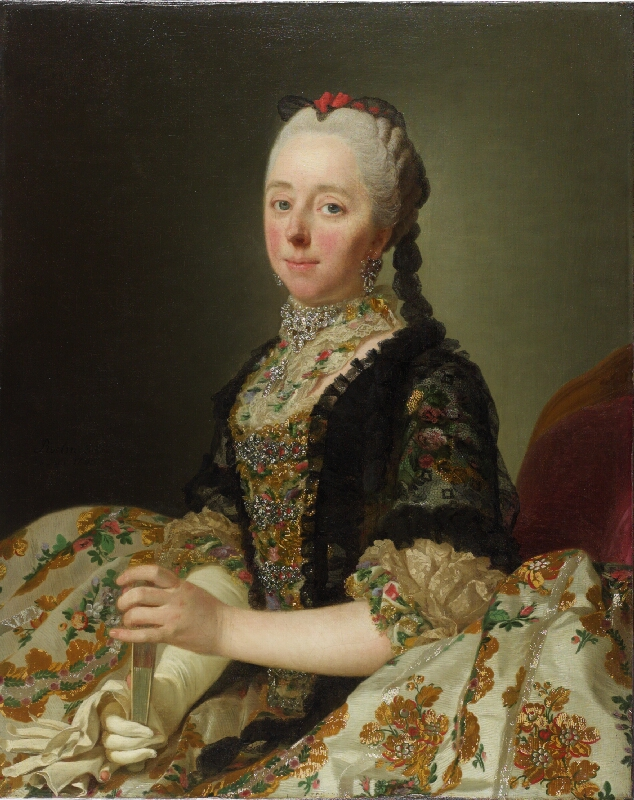
Isabella, Countess of Hertford by Alexander Roslin (1765) Hunterian Art Gallery, University of Glasgow

== Legacy ==
Grafton Street in Dublin is named after him. He owned property in the area. Grafton, Massachusetts, is named after him.

Winchester, New Hampshire was originally named "Arlington" in his honour (as in, the Earl of Arlington).

Through his daughter, Isabella, he is an ancestor of the late Diana, Princess of Wales.

== Sources ==
- R.H. Nichols and F.A. Wray, The History of the Foundling Hospital (London: Oxford University Press, 1935)

Political offices
Preceded by The Duke of Bolton	Lord Lieutenant of Ireland; 1720–1724	Succeeded by The Lord Carteret
Preceded by The Duke of Newcastle	Lord Chamberlain; 1724–1757	Succeeded by The 4th Duke of Devonshire
Honorary titles
Vacant Title last held by The 1st Duke of Devonshire	Lord High Steward; 1714	Vacant Title next held by The Lord Cowper
Preceded by The Earl of Dysart	Lord Lieutenant of Suffolk; 1705–1757	Succeeded by The Duke of Grafton
Preceded by The Earl of Dysart	Vice-Admiral of Suffolk; 1705–1757	Vacant Title next held by The Marquess of Hertford
Peerage of England
Preceded by Henry FitzRoy	Duke of Grafton; 1690–1757	Succeeded by Augustus FitzRoy
Preceded by Isabella Bennett	Earl of Arlington; 1723–1757	Succeeded by Augustus FitzRoy
