= List of MPs elected in the 1784 British general election =

1784–1790 Parliament of Great Britain
←	1780–1784 Parliament	1790–1796 Parliament	→

Overview
- Legislative body: Parliament of Great Britain
- Meeting place: Palace of Westminster
- Term: 19 May 1784 – 10 June 1790
- Election: 1784 British general election
- Government: First Pitt ministry

House of Commons
- Members: 558
- Speaker: Charles Wolfran Cornwall
- Leader: William Pitt the Younger

House of Lords
- Lord Chancellor: The Baron Thurlow
- Leader: The Viscount Sydney

Crown-in-Parliament King George III

Sessions
- 1st: 19 May 1784 – 20 August 1784
- 2nd: 25 January 1785 – 29 July 1785
- 3rd: 24 January 1786 – 11 July 1786
- 4th: 23 January 1787 – 30 May 1787
- 5th: 27 November 1787 – 11 July 1788
- 6th: 3 February 1789 – 11 August 1789
- 7th: 21 January 1790 – 10 June 1790

MPs elected in the 1784 British general election

14th Parliament	(1774)
15th Parliament	(1780)
16th Parliament	(1784)
17th Parliament	(1790)
18th Parliament	(1796 )

This is a list of the 558 MPs or members of Parliament elected to the 314 constituencies of the Parliament of Great Britain in 1784, the 16th Parliament of Great Britain and their replacements returned at subsequent by-elections, arranged by constituency.

Table of contents:

A B C D E F G H I J K L M N O P Q R S T U V W X Y Z By-elections Changes

== A ==
Aberdeen Burghs (seat 1/1)	Sir David Carnegie, 4th Baronet	
Aberdeenshire (seat 1/1)	Alexander Garden – died Replaced by George Skene 1786	Independent
Abingdon (seat 1/1)	Edward Loveden Loveden	
Aldborough (seat 1/2)	Richard Arden	
Aldborough (seat 2/2)	John Gally Knight	
Aldeburgh (seat 1/2)	Samuel Salt	
Aldeburgh (seat 2/2)	Philip Champion Crespigny	
Amersham (seat1/2)	William Drake, Jr.	Tory
Amersham (seat 2/2)	William Drake, Sr.	Tory
Andover (seat 1/2)	Benjamin Lethieullier	
Andover (seat 2/2)	Sir John Griffin – succeeded to peerage Replaced by William Fellowes 1784	
Anglesey (seat 1/1)	Nicholas Bayly	
Anstruther Easter Burghs (seat 1/1)	John Anstruther	
Appleby (seat 1/2)	Hon. John Leveson Gower	
Appleby (seat 2/2)	Richard Penn	
Argyllshire (seat 1/1)	Lord Frederick Campbell	
Arundel (seat 1/2)	Earl of Surrey – sat for Carlisle; Replaced by Richard Beckford 1784	
Arundel (seat 2/2)	Thomas Fitzherbert	
Ashburton (seat 1/2)	Robert Palk – resigned Replaced by Lawrence Palk 1787	
Ashburton (seat 2/2)	Robert Mackreth	
Aylesbury (seat 1/2)	Sir Thomas Hallifax – died Replaced by Scrope Bernard 1789	
Aylesbury (seat 2/2)	William Wrightson	
Ayr Burghs (seat 1/1)	Archibald Edmonstone	
Ayrshire (seat 1/1)	Hugh Montgomerie – took office Replaced by Wiliam MacDowall 1789	
== B ==
Banbury (seat 1/1)	Frederick North, Lord North	Tory
Banffshire (seat 1/1)	Sir James Duff – resigned Replaced by James Ferguson 1789	
Barnstaple (seat 1/2)	William Devaynes	
Barnstaple (seat 2/2)	John Clevland	Whig
Bath (seat 1/2)	Abel Moysey	
Bath (seat 2/2)	Hon. John Jeffreys Pratt	
Beaumaris (seat 1/1)	Hon. Hugh Fortescue – succeeded to peerage Replaced by Sir Hugh Williams, 8th Baronet 1785	
Bedford (seat 1/2)	William MacDowall Colhoun	
Bedford (seat 2/2)	Samuel Whitbread	
Bedfordshire (seat 1/2)	John FitzPatrick, 2nd Earl of Upper Ossory	Whig
Bedfordshire (seat 2/2)	Robert Ongley; Replaced by Hon. St Andrew St John 1785	
Bere Alston (seat 1/2)	Viscount Feilding	
Bere Alston (seat 2/2)	The Earl of Mornington – took office Replaced by Charles Rainsford 1787– resigned Replaced by John Mitford 1788	
Berkshire (seat 1/2)	George Vansittart	
Berkshire (seat 2/2)	Henry James Pye	
Berwickshire (seat 1/1)	Patrick Home	
Berwick-upon-Tweed (seat 1/2)	Sir John Delaval, Bt – ennobled Replaced by Sir Gilbert Elliot, Bt 1786	
Berwick-upon-Tweed (seat 2/2)	Hon. John Vaughan	
Beverley (seat 1/2)	Sir Christopher Sykes, Bt	
Beverley (seat 2/2)	Sir James Pennyman, Bt	
Bewdley (seat 1/1)	William Henry Lyttelton	
Bishops Castle (seat 1/2)	William Clive	
Bishops Castle (seat 2/2)	Henry Strachey	
Bletchingley (seat 1/2)	John Kenrick	
Bletchingley (seat 2/2)	John Nicholls – resigned Replaced by Sir Robert Clayton 1787	
Bodmin (seat 1/2)	Sir John Morshead	
Bodmin (seat 2/2)	Thomas Hunt – died Replaced by George Wilbraham 1789	
Boroughbridge (seat 1/2)	Sir Richard Sutton, Bt	
Boroughbridge (seat 2/2)	The Viscount Palmerston	
Bossiney (seat 1/2)	Hon. Charles Stuart	
Bossiney (seat 2/2)	Bamber Gascoigne, senior – took office Replaced by Matthew Montagu 1786	
Boston (seat 1/2)	Sir Peter Burrell	
Boston (seat 2/2)	Dalhousie Watherston	
Brackley (seat 1/2)	John William Egerton	
Brackley (seat 2/2)	Timothy Caswall – took office Replaced by Samuel Haynes 1789	
Bramber (seat 1/2)	Daniel Pulteney – took office Replaced by Robert Hobart 1788	
Bramber (seat 2/2)	Sir Henry Gough	
Brecon (seat 1/1)	Charles Gould, – resigned Replaced by Sir Charles Gould Morgan 1787	
Breconshire (seat 1/1)	Charles Morgan – died Replaced by Sir Charles Gould 1787	
Bridgnorth (seat 1/2)	Isaac Hawkins Browne	
Bridgnorth (seat 2/2)	Thomas Whitmore	
Bridgwater (seat 1/2)	Hon. Anne Poulett – died Replaced by Robert Thornton 1785	
Bridgwater (seat 2/2)	Rear-Admiral Alexander Hood	
Bridport (seat 1/2)	Thomas Scott	
Bridport (seat 2/2)	Charles Sturt	
Bristol (seat 1/2)	Matthew Brickdale	
Bristol (seat 2/2)	Henry Cruger	
Buckingham (seat 1/2)	Charles Edmund Nugent	
Buckingham (seat 2/2)	Richard Grenville	Grenvillite
Buckinghamshire (seat 1/2)	William Grenville	
Buckinghamshire (seat 2/2)	Sir John Aubrey, 6th Bt	
Bury St Edmunds (seat 1/2)	Sir Charles Davers, Bt	
Bury St Edmunds (seat 2/2)	Hon. George FitzRoy – resigned Replaced by Lord Charles FitzRoy 1787	
Buteshire (seat 1/1)	James Stuart II	
== C ==
Caernarvon Boroughs (seat 1/1)	Glyn Wynn	
Caernarvonshire (seat 1/1)	John Parry	
Caithness (seat 0/0)	Alternating seat with Bute-shire. No representation in 1784	
Callington (seat 1/2)	Sir John Call	
Callington (seat 2/2)	Paul Orchard	
Calne (seat 1/2)	James Townsend – died Replaced by Joseph Jekyll 1787	
Calne (seat 2/2)	Isaac Barré	
Cambridge (seat 1/2)	James Whorwood Adeane – took office Replaced by Edward Finch 1789	
Cambridge (seat 2/2)	John Mortlock – resigned Replaced by Francis Dickins 1788	
Cambridgeshire (seat 1/2)	Sir Henry Peyton, Bt – died Replaced by James Whorwood Adeane 1789	
Cambridgeshire (seat 2/2)	Viscount Royston	
Cambridge University (seat 1/2)	William Pitt the Younger	
Cambridge University (seat 2/2)	Earl of Euston	
Camelford (seat 1/2)	Jonathan Phillips – resigned Replaced by Sir Samuel Hannay, Bt 1784	
Camelford (seat 2/2)	James Macpherson	
Canterbury (seat 1/2)	George Gipps	
Canterbury (seat 2/2)	Charles Robinson	
Cardiff Boroughs (seat 1/1)	Sir Herbert Mackworth	
Cardigan Boroughs (seat 1/1)	John Campbell	
Cardiganshire (seat 1/1)	Viscount Lisburne	
Carlisle (seat 1/2)	Earl of Surrey – succeeded to peerage Replaced by Edward Knubley 1786 – unseated on petition Replaced by Rowland Stephenson 1786	
Carlisle (seat 2/2)	Edward Norton – died Replaced by John Lowther 1786 – unseated on petition Replaced by John Christian 1786	
Carmarthen (seat 1/1)	John George Philipps	
Carmarthenshire (seat 1/1)	Sir William Mansel	
Castle Rising (seat 1/2)	Charles Boone	
Castle Rising (seat 2/2)	Walter Sneyd	
Cheshire (seat 1/2)	John Crewe	Whig
Cheshire (seat 2/2)	Sir Robert Salusbury Cotton, Bt	
Chester (seat 1/2)	Richard Wilbraham-Bootle	
Chester (seat 2/2)	Thomas Grosvenor	
Chichester (seat 1/2)	George White-Thomas	
Chichester (seat 2/2)	Thomas Steele	
Chippenham (seat 1/2)	James Dawkins	
Chippenham (seat 2/2)	George Fludyer	
Chipping Wycombe (seat 1/2)	Viscount Mahon – succeeded to peerage Replaced by Earl Wycombe 1786	
Chipping Wycombe (seat 2/2)	Robert Waller	
Christchurch (seat 1/2)	Sir James Harris – ennobled Replaced by Hans Sloane 1788	
Christchurch (seat 2/2)	(Sir) John Frederick	Whig
Cirencester (seat 1/2)	Lord Apsley	
Cirencester (seat 2/2)	Samuel Blackwell – died Replaced by Richard Master 1785	
Clackmannanshire (seat 1/1)	Charles Allan Cathcart – died Died and replaced by Burnet Abercromby 1788	
Clitheroe (seat 1/2)	Thomas Lister	
Clitheroe (seat 2/2)	John Lee	
Cockermouth (seat 1/2)	James Clarke Satterthwaite	
Cockermouth (seat 2/2)	John Lowther – resigned Replaced by Humphrey Senhouse 1786	
Colchester (seat 1/2)	Christopher Potter – election void Replaced by Sir Robert Smyth, Bt 1784	
Colchester (seat 2/2)	Sir Edmund Affleck, Bt – died Replaced by George Tierney	
Corfe Castle (seat 1/2)	John Bond	
Corfe Castle (seat 2/2)	Henry Bankes	
Cornwall (seat 1/2)	Sir William Molesworth, Bt	
Cornwall (seat 2/2)	Sir William Lemon	
Coventry (seat 1/2)	Sir Sampson Gideon, Bt	
Coventry (seat 2/2)	John Eardley Wilmot	
Cricklade (seat 1/2)	Charles Westley Coxe – unseated on petition Replaced by John Walker-Heneage 1785	
Cricklade (seat 2/2)	Robert Adamson – unseated on petition Replaced by Robert Nicholas 1785 – took office Replaced by Thomas Estcourt 1790	
Cromartyshire (seat 0/0)	Alternating seat with Nairnshire. No representation in 1784	
Cumberland (seat 1/2)	Henry Fletcher	
Cumberland (seat 2/2)	Sir William Lowther, Bt	
== D ==
Dartmouth (seat 1/2)	Arthur Holdsworth – died Replaced by Edmund Bastard 1787	
Dartmouth (seat 2/2)	Richard Hopkins	
Denbigh Boroughs (seat 1/1)	Richard Myddelton – resigned Replaced by Richard Myddelton (II) 1788	
Denbighshire (seat 1/1)	Sir Watkin Williams-Wynn, 4th Baronet – died Replaced by Robert Watkin Wynne 1789	
Derby (seat 1/2)	Lord George Cavendish	
Derby (seat 2/2)	Edward Coke	
Derbyshire (seat 1/2)	Lord George Cavendish	Whig
Derbyshire (seat 2/2)	Edward Miller Mundy	
Devizes (seat 1/2)	James Tylney Long – resigned Replaced by Joshua Smith 1788	
Devizes (seat 2/2)	Henry Addington	
Devon (seat 1/2)	John Pollexfen Bastard	
Devon (seat 2/2)	John Rolle	
Dorchester (seat 1/2)	Hon. George Damer	
Dorchester (seat 2/2)	William Ewer – died Replaced by Thomas Ewer 1789 – died Replaced by Hon. Cropley Ashley 1790	
Dorset (seat 1/2)	Francis John Browne	
Dorset (seat 2/2)	Hon. George Pitt	
Dover (seat 1/2)	Captain the Hon. James Luttrell – died Replaced by John Trevanion 1789	
Dover (seat 2/2)	Robert Preston	
Downton (seat 1/2)	William Scott– double return Replaced by Robert Shafto 1785	
Downton (seat 2/2)	Edward Bouverie– double return Replaced by Hon. William Seymour-Conway 1785	
Droitwich (seat 1/2)	Sir Edward Winnington, Bt	
Droitwich (seat 2/2)	Andrew Foley	
Dumfries Burghs (seat 1/1)	Sir James Johnstone, 4th Bt	
Dumfriesshire (seat 1/1)	Sir Robert Laurie, Bt	
Dunbartonshire (seat 1/1)	George Keith Elphinstone	
Dunwich (seat 1/2)	Barne Barne	
Dunwich (seat 2/2)	Gerard Vanneck	
Durham (City of) (seat 1/2)	John Tempest	
Durham (City of) (seat 2/2)	John Lambton – resigned Replaced by William Henry Lambton 1787	
Durham (County) (seat 1/2)	Sir Thomas Clavering, 7th Baronet	
Durham (County) (seat 2/2)	Sir John Eden, Bt	
Dysart Burghs (seat 1/1)	Sir Charles Preston, Bt	
== E ==
East Grinstead (seat 1/2)	Henry Arthur Herbert – resigned Replaced by James Cuninghame 1786 – died Replaced by Robert Cuninghame 1789 – resigned Replaced by Richard Ford 1789	
East Grinstead (seat 2/2)	George Medley	
East Looe (seat 1/2)	William Graves – resigned Replaced by Alexander Irvine 1786 – died Replaced by The Earl of Carysfort 1790	
East Looe (seat 2/2)	John Buller – died Replaced by Richard Grosvenor 1786 – resigned Replaced by Viscount Belgrave 1788	
East Retford (seat 1/2)	Wharton Amcotts	
East Retford (seat 2/2)	Earl of Lincoln	
Edinburgh (seat 1/1)	James Hunter Blair – resigned Replaced by Sir Adam Fergusson 1784	
Edinburghshire (seat 1/1)	Henry Dundas	
Elgin Burghs (seat 1/1)	William Adam	
Elginshire (seat 1/1)	James Duff, Earl of Fife	
Essex (seat 1/2)	Colonel John Bullock	
Essex (seat 2/2)	Thomas Berney Bramston	
Evesham (seat 1/2)	Charles Boughton	
Evesham (seat 2/2)	John Rushout	
Exeter (seat 1/2)	Sir Charles Warwick Bampfylde	
Exeter (seat 2/2)	John Baring, 1776	
Eye (seat 1/2)	Richard Burton Phillipson	
Eye (seat 2/2)	Peter Bathurst	
== F ==
Fife (seat 1/1)	Robert Skene – died Replaced by William Wemyss 1787	
Flint Boroughs (seat 1/1)	Watkin Williams	
Flintshire (seat 1/1)	Sir Roger Mostyn, Bt	
Forfarshire (seat 1/1)	Archibald Douglas	
Fowey (seat 1/2)	Philip Rashleigh	
Fowey (seat 2/2)	John Grant – resigned Replaced by Hon. Richard Edgcumbe 1786	
== G ==
Gatton (seat 1/2)	Maurice Lloyd – resigned Replaced by James Fraser 1787	
Gatton (seat 2/2)	The Lord Newhaven	
Glamorganshire (seat 1/1)	Charles Edwin – resigned Replaced by Thomas Wyndham 1789	
Glasgow Burghs (seat 1/1)	Ilay Campbell – took office Replaced by John Craufurd 1790	
Gloucester (seat 1/2)	John Webb	
Gloucester (seat 2/2)	Charles Barrow – died Replaced by John Pitt 1789	
Gloucestershire (seat 1/2)	Thomas Master	
Gloucestershire (seat 2/2)	Hon. George Cranfield Berkeley	
Grampound (seat 1/2)	Hon. John Somers Cocks	
Grampound (seat 2/2)	Francis Baring	
Grantham (seat 1/2)	Francis Cockayne-Cust	
Grantham (seat 2/2)	George Manners-Sutton	
Great Bedwyn (seat 1/2)	Marquess of Graham	
Great Bedwyn (seat 2/2)	Lieutenant-Colonel Robert Manners	
Great Grimsby (seat 1/2)	John Harrison	
Great Grimsby (seat 2/2)	Dudley Long	
Great Marlow (seat 1/2)	William Clayton	
Great Marlow (seat 2/2)	Captain Sir Thomas Rich	
Great Yarmouth (seat 1/2)	Captain Sir John Jervis	
Great Yarmouth (seat 2/2)	Henry Beaufoy	
Guildford (seat 1/2)	Viscount Cranley	
Guildford (seat 2/2)	Chapple Norton	
== H ==
Haddington Burghs (seat 1/1)	Francis Charteris – eldest son of Scottish peer Replaced by William Fullarton 1787	
Haddingtonshire (seat 1/1)	Hew Dalrymple – took office Replaced by John Hamilton 1786	
Hampshire (seat 1/2)	Robert Thistlethwayte	
Hampshire (seat 2/2)	Jervoise Clarke Jervoise	
Harwich (seat 1/2)	Thomas Orde	
Harwich (seat 2/2)	John Robinson	
Haslemere (seat 1/2)	Thomas Postlethwaite – resigned Replaced by John Lowther, 1786	
Haslemere (seat 2/2)	John Baynes-Garforth	
Hastings (seat 1/2)	John Dawes	
Hastings (seat 2/2)	John Stanley	
Haverfordwest (seat 1/1)	The Lord Milford – resigned Replaced by Lord Kensington 1786	
Hedon (seat 1/2)	Lionel Darell	
Hedon (seat 2/2)	William Chaytor	
Helston (seat 1/2)	John Rogers – resigned Replaced by Roger Wilbraham, 1786	
Helston (seat 2/2)	Lord Hyde – succeeded to peerage Replaced by James Burges, 1787	
Hereford (seat 1/2)	Earl of Surrey – sat for Carlisle; Replaced by Robert Philipps 1784– resigned; replaced by James Walwyn 1785	
Hereford (seat 2/2)	John Scudamore	
Herefordshire (seat 1/2)	Thomas Harley	
Herefordshire (seat 2/2)	Sir George Cornewall, Bt	
Hertford (seat 1/2)	Thomas, Baron Dimsdale	
Hertford (seat 2/2)	John Calvert	
Hertfordshire (seat 1/2)	William Plumer	
Hertfordshire (seat 2/2)	The Viscount Grimston	
Heytesbury (seat 1/2)	William Pierce Ashe A'Court	
Heytesbury (seat 2/2)	William Eden	
Higham Ferrers (seat 1/1)	Frederick Montagu	
Hindon (seat 1/2)	William Egerton	
Hindon (seat 2/2)	Edward Bearcroft	
Honiton (seat 1/2)	Sir George Yonge, Bt	
Honiton (seat 2/2)	Sir George Collier	
Horsham (seat 1/2)	Jeremiah Crutchley	
Horsham (seat 2/2)	Philip Metcalfe	
Huntingdon (seat 1/2)	Walter Rawlinson	
Huntingdon (seat 2/2)	Lancelot Brown – resigned Replaced by John Willett Payne 1787	
Huntingdonshire (seat 1/2)	Viscount Hinchingbrooke	
Huntingdonshire (seat 2/2)	The Earl Ludlow	
Hythe (seat 1/2)	Sir Charles Farnaby	
Hythe (seat 2/2)	William Evelyn	
== I ==
Ilchester (seat 1/2)	Peregrine Cust – died Replaced by John Harcourt 1785 – unseated on petition Replaced by Captain George Johnstone 1786– resigned Replaced by George Sumner 1787	
Ilchester (seat 2/2)	Benjamin Bond-Hopkins	
Inverness Burghs (seat 1/1)	Sir Hector Munro	
Inverness-shire (seat 1/1)	Lord William Gordon	
Ipswich (seat 1/2)	William Middleton	
Ipswich (seat 2/2)	John Cator – election void Replaced by Charles Crickitt June 1784	
== K ==
Kent (seat 1/2)	Hon. Charles Marsham Bt	
Kent (seat 2/2)	Filmer Honywood	
Kincardineshire (seat 1/1)	Lord Adam Gordon – resigned Replaced by Robert Barclay Allardice 1788	
King's Lynn (seat 1/2)	Hon. Horatio Walpole	
King's Lynn (seat 2/2)	Crisp Molineux	
Kingston upon Hull (seat 1/2)	Samuel Thornton	
Kingston upon Hull (seat 2/2)	William Wilberforce – sat for Yorkshire; Replaced by Walter Spencer Stanhope 1784	
Kinross-shire (seat 0/0)	Alternating seat with Clackmannanshire. No representation in 1784	
Kirkcudbright Stewartry (seat 1/1)	Peter Johnston – resigned Replaced by Alexander Stewart 1786	
Knaresborough (seat 1/2)	James Hare	
Knaresborough (seat 2/2)	Viscount Duncannon	
== L ==
Lanarkshire (seat 1/1)	Sir James Denham-Steuart, Bt	
Lancashire (seat 1/2)	Thomas Stanley	
Lancashire (seat 2/2)	John Blackburne	
Lancaster (seat 1/2)	Captain Francis Reynolds – succeeded to peerage Replaced by Sir George Warren 1786	
Lancaster (seat 2/2)	Abraham Rawlinson	
Launceston (seat 1/2)	Hon. Charles Perceval	
Launceston (seat 2/2)	George Rose – took office Replaced by Sir John Swinburne, Bt 1788	
Leicester (seat 1/2)	John Macnamara	
Leicester (seat 2/2)	Charles Loraine-Smith	
Leicestershire (seat 1/2)	John Peach-Hungerford	
Leicestershire (seat 2/2)	William Pochin	
Leominster (seat 1/2)	John Hunter	
Leominster (seat 2/2)	Penn Assheton Curzon	
Lewes (seat 1/2)	Henry Pelham	
Lewes (seat 2/2)	Thomas Kemp	
Lichfield (seat 1/2)	Thomas Gilbert	
Lichfield (seat 1/2)	George Adams (later Anson) – died Replaced by Thomas Anson 1789	
Lincoln (seat 1/2)	John Fenton-Cawthorne	
Lincoln (seat 2/2)	Richard Lumley-Savile	
Lincolnshire (seat 1/2)	Sir John Thorold	
Lincolnshire (seat 2/2)	Charles Anderson-Pelham	
Linlithgow Burghs (seat 1/1)	Sir John Moore	
Linlithgowshire (seat 1/1)	Sir William Cunynghame	
Liskeard (seat 1/2)	Edward James Eliot	
Liskeard (seat 2/2)	John Eliot	
Liverpool (seat 1/2)	Bamber Gascoyne	
Liverpool (seat 2/2)	Richard Pennant	
London (City of) (seat 1/4)	John Sawbridge	
London (City of) (seat 2/4)	Brook Watson	
London (City of) (seat 3/4)	Nathaniel Newman	
London (City of) (seat 4/4)	Sir Watkin Lewes	
Lostwithiel (seat 1/2)	John Sinclair	
Lostwithiel (seat 2/2)	John Thomas Ellis	
Ludgershall (seat 1/2)	George Augustus Selwyn	
Ludgershall (seat 2/2)	Nathaniel William Wraxall	
Ludlow (seat 1/2)	Richard Payne Knight	
Ludlow (seat 2/2)	The Lord Clive	
Lyme Regis (seat 1/2)	Hon. Henry Fane	
Lyme Regis (seat 2/2)	Hon. Thomas Fane	
Lymington (seat 1/2)	Robert Colt	
Lymington (seat 2/2)	Harry Burrard – resigned Replaced by George Rose, 1788	
== M ==
Maidstone (seat 1/2)	Gerard Noel Edwards – resigned Replaced by Sir Matthew Bloxham 1788	
Maidstone (seat 2/2)	Clement Taylor	
Maldon (seat 1/2)	John Strutt	Tory
Maldon (seat 2/2)	The Lord Waltham – died Replaced by Sir Peter Parker, Bt 1787	
Malmesbury (seat 1/2)	The Viscount Melbourne	
Malmesbury (seat 2/2)	Viscount Maitland – ennobled Replaced by Paul Benfield 1790	
Malton (seat 1/2)	Edmund Burke	Whig
Malton (seat 2/2)	Sir Thomas Gascoigne – resigned Replaced by William Weddell 1784	
Marlborough (seat 1/2)	The Earl of Courtown	
Marlborough (seat 2/2)	Sir Philip Hales	
Merionethshire (seat 1/1)	Evan Lloyd Vaughan	
Middlesex (seat 1/2)	John Wilkes	Radical
Middlesex (seat 2/2)	William Mainwaring	
Midhurst (seat 1/2)	Benjamin Lethieullier – sat for Andover; Replaced by Edward Cotsford, 1784	
Midhurst (seat 2/2)	Hon. Henry Drummond	
Milborne Port (seat 1/2)	John Townson – resigned Replaced by William Popham 1787	
Milborne Port (seat 2/2)	John Pennington	
Minehead (seat 1/2)	Henry Beaufoy – sat for Great Yarmouth; Replaced by Captain the Hon. Charles Phipps 1784 – died Replaced by Robert Wood 1786	
Minehead (seat 2/2)	John Fownes Luttrell	
Mitchell (seat 1/2)	David Howell	
Mitchell (seat 2/2)	Sir Christopher Hawkins	
Monmouth Boroughs (seat 1/1)	John Stepney – resigned Replaced by Marquess of Worcester 1788	
Monmouthshire (seat 1/2)	John Morgan	
Monmouthshire (seat 2/2)	John Hanbury– died Replaced by Henry, Viscount Nevill 1784 – succeeded to peerage Replaced by James Rooke 1785	
Montgomery (seat 1/1)	Whitshed Keene	
Montgomeryshire (seat 1/1)	William Mostyn Owen	
Morpeth (seat 1/2)	Major Sir James Erskine	
Morpeth (seat 2/2)	Peter Delmé – died Replaced by Francis Gregg 1790	
== N ==
Nairnshire (seat 1/1)	Alexander Campbell – died Replaced by Alexander Brodie 1785	
Newark (seat 1/2)	John Manners-Sutton	
Newark (seat 2/2)	Constantine John Phipps	
Newcastle-under-Lyme (seat 1/2)	Richard Vernon	
Newcastle-under-Lyme (seat 2/2)	Sir Archibald Macdonald	
Newcastle-upon-Tyne (seat 1/2)	Charles Brandling	
Newcastle-upon-Tyne (seat 2/2)	Sir Matthew White Ridley, Bt	
Newport (Cornwall) (seat 1/2)	Sir John Riggs-Miller	
Newport (Cornwall) (seat 2/2)	John Coghill – died Replaced by William Mitford1785	
Newport (Isle of Wight) (seat 1/2)	Edward Rushworth	
Newport (Isle of Wight) (seat 2/2)	Captain the Hon. Hugh Seymour-Conway – resigned Replaced by Hon. John Thomas Townshend1786– took office Replaced by George Byng 1790	
New Radnor Boroughs (seat 1/1)	Edward Lewis	
New Romney (seat 1/2)	Sir Edward Dering, Bt – resigned Replaced by Richard Joseph Sullivan 1787	
New Romney (seat 2/2)	John Smith – resigned Replaced by Richard Atkinson 1784 – died replaced by John Henniker 1785	
New Shoreham (seat 1/2)	Sir Cecil Bisshopp	
New Shoreham (seat 2/2)	John Peachey	
Newton (Lancashire) (seat 1/2)	Thomas Peter Legh	
Newton (Lancashire) (seat 2/2)	Thomas Davenport, KC – died Replaced by Thomas Brooke 1786	
Newtown (Isle of Wight) (seat 1/2)	James Worsley – resigned Replaced by Mark Gregory 1784	
Newtown (Isle of Wight) (seat 2/2)	Sir John Barrington, Bt	
New Windsor (seat 1/2)	John Montagu – died Replaced by The Earl of Mornington 1787	
New Windsor (seat 2/2)	Peniston Portlock Powney	
New Woodstock (seat 1/2)	Sir Henry Watkin Dashwood	
New Woodstock (seat 2/2)	Francis Burton	
Norfolk (seat 1/2)	Sir Edward Astley, Bt	
Norfolk (seat 2/2)	Sir John Wodehouse, Bt	
Northallerton (seat 1/2)	Edwin Lascelles	
Northallerton (seat 2/2)	Henry Peirse (younger)	
Northampton (seat 1/2)	Lord Compton	
Northampton (seat 2/2)	Fiennes Trotman	
Northamptonshire (seat 1/2)	Sir James Langham, Bt	
Northamptonshire (seat 2/2)	Thomas Powys	
Northumberland (seat 1/2)	Lord Algernon Percy – succeeded to peerage Replaced by Hon. Charles Grey 1786	
Northumberland (seat 2/2)	Sir William Middleton, Bt	
Norwich (seat 1/2)	Harbord Harbord – ennobled Replaced by Hon. Henry Hobart 1786	
Norwich (seat 2/2)	William Windham	
Nottingham (seat 1/2)	Daniel Coke	
Nottingham (seat 2/2)	Robert Smith	
Nottinghamshire (seat 1/2)	Lord Edward Bentinck	
Nottinghamshire (seat 2/2)	Charles Medows (Charles Pierrepont)	
== O ==
Okehampton (seat 1/2)	John Luxmoore -unseated on petition Replaced by Viscount Malden 1785	
Okehampton (seat 2/2)	Thomas Wiggens – unseated on petition Replaced by Humphrey Minchin 1785	
Old Sarum (seat 1/2)	George Hardinge	
Old Sarum (seat 2/2)	The Hon. John Villiers	
Orford (seat 1/2)	Viscount Beauchamp	
Orford (seat 2/2)	Hon. George Seymour-Conway	
Orkney and Shetland (seat 1/1)	Thomas Dundas	
Oxford (seat 1/2)	Lord Robert Spencer	
Oxford (seat 2/2)	Captain the Hon. Peregrine Bertie	
Oxfordshire (seat 1/2)	Lord Charles Spencer	Whig
Oxfordshire (seat 2/2)	Viscount Wenman	
Oxford University (seat 1/2)	Francis Page	
Oxford University (seat 2/2)	Sir William Dolben, Bt	
== P ==
Peeblesshire (seat 1/1)	David Murray	
Pembroke Boroughs (seat 1/1)	Hugh Owen III	Whig
Pembrokeshire (seat 1/1)	Hugh Owen – died Replaced by The Lord Milford 1786	
Penryn (seat 1/2)	Sir Francis Basset	
Penryn (seat 2/2)	Sir John St Aubyn	
Perth Burghs (seat 1/1)	George Dempster	
Perthshire (seat 1/1)	James Murray	
Peterborough (seat 1/2)	Richard Benyon	
Peterborough (seat 2/2)	James Farrel Phipps – died Replaced by Hon. Lionel Damer 1786	
Petersfield (seat 1/2)	William Jolliffe	
Petersfield (seat 2/2)	Thomas Samuel Jolliffe – resigned Replaced by The Viscount Downe 1787	
Plymouth (seat 1/2)	Captain John Macbride	
Plymouth (seat 2/2)	Captain Robert Fanshawe – took office Replaced by Alan Gardner 1790	
Plympton Erle (seat 1/2)	Paul Treby Ourry – resigned Replaced by John Pardoe 1784	
Plympton Erle (seat 2/2)	John Stephenson	
Pontefract (seat 1/2)	William Sotheron	
Pontefract (seat 2/2)	John Smyth	
Poole (seat 1/2)	Michael Angelo Taylor	
Poole (seat 2/2)	William Morton Pitt	
Portsmouth (seat 1/2)	Sir Henry Fetherstonhaugh, Bt	
Portsmouth (seat 2/2)	Hon. William Cornwallis	
Preston (seat 1/2)	John Burgoyne	
Preston (seat 2/2)	Sir Harry Hoghton, Bt	
== Q ==
Queenborough (seat 1/2)	John Clater Aldridge	
Queenborough (seat 2/2)	Captain George Bowyer	
== R ==
Radnorshire (seat 1/1)	Thomas Johnes	
Reading (seat 1/2)	Richard Aldworth-Neville	
Reading (seat 2/2)	Francis Annesley	
Reigate (seat 1/2)	William Bellingham – took office Replaced by The Lord Hood 1789	
Reigate (seat 2/2)	Edward Leeds – resigned Replaced by Reginald Pole-Carew 1787	
Renfrewshire (seat 1/1)	William Macdowall – resigned Replaced by John Shaw-Stewart 1786	
Richmond (Yorkshire) (seat 1/2)	The Earl of Inchiquin	
Richmond (Yorkshire) (seat 2/2)	Charles Dundas – resigned Replaced by Sir Grey Cooper 1786	
Ripon (seat 1/2)	William Lawrence	
Ripon (seat 2/2)	Frederick Robinson – pensioned Replaced by Sir John Goodricke, Bt 1787 – died replaced by Sir George Allanson-Winn, Bt 1789	
Rochester (seat 1/2)	Captain Sir Charles Middleton	
Rochester (seat 2/2)	Nathaniel Smith	
Ross-shire (seat 1/1)	Francis Humberston Mackenzie	
Roxburghshire (seat 1/1)	Sir George Douglas	
Rutland (seat 1/2)	Thomas Noel – died Replaced by Gerard Edwardes 1788	
Rutland (seat 2/2)	George Bridges Brudenell	
Rye (seat 1/2)	Charles Wolfran Cornwall – died Replaced by Charles Long 1789	
Rye (seat 2/2)	William Dickinson	
== S ==
St Albans (seat 1/2)	William Charles Sloper	
St Albans (seat 2/2)	Hon. William Grimston	
St Germans (seat 1/2)	John Hamilton – succeeded to peerage Replaced by Sir Charles Hamilton 1790	
St Germans (seat 2/2)	Abel Smith – died Replaced by Samuel Smith 1788	
St Ives (seat 1/2)	William Praed	
St Ives (seat 2/2)	Richard Barwell	
St Mawes (seat 1/2)	Viscount Clare– resigned Sir William Young 1784	
St Mawes (seat 2/2)	Hugh Boscawen	
Salisbury (seat 1/2)	Hon. William Henry Bouverie	
Salisbury (seat 2/2)	William Hussey	
Saltash (seat 1/2)	Charles Ambler	
Saltash (seat 2/2)	Charles Jenkinson – ennobled Replaced by The Earl of Mornington 1786 – unseated on petition replaced by John Lemon 1787	
Sandwich (seat 1/2)	Philip Stephens	
Sandwich (seat 2/2)	Charles Brett	
Scarborough (seat 1/2)	Earl of Tyrconnell	
Scarborough (seat 2/2)	George Osbaldeston	
Seaford (seat 1/2)	Henry Nevill – election void Replaced by Sir John Henderson, Bt 1784- unseated on petition Replaced by Henry Flood 1786	
Seaford (seat 2/2)	Sir Peter Parker, Bt – election void Replaced by Sir Godfrey Webster, Bt 1786	
Selkirkshire (seat 1/1)	John Pringle – resigned Replaced by Mark Pringle 1786	
Shaftesbury (seat 1/2)	Hans Winthrop Mortimer	
Shaftesbury (seat 2/2)	Adam Drummond – died Replaced by John Drummond 1786	
Shrewsbury (seat 1/2)	William Pulteney	
Shrewsbury (seat 2/2)	Sir Charlton Leighton– died Replaced by John Hill 1784	
Shropshire (seat 1/2)	John Kynaston	
Shropshire (seat 2/2)	Sir Richard Hill	
Somerset (seat 1/2)	Sir John Trevelyan, Bt	
Somerset (seat 2/2)	Edward Phelips	
Southampton (seat 1/2)	John Fleming	
Southampton (seat 2/2)	James Amyatt	
Southwark (seat 1/2)	Henry Thornton	
Southwark (seat 2/2)	Sir Barnard Turner – died Replaced by Paul le Mesurier 1784	
Stafford (seat 1/2)	Edward Monckton	
Stafford (seat 2/2)	Richard Brinsley Sheridan	
Staffordshire (seat 1/2)	Sir Edward Littleton	
Staffordshire (seat 2/2)	Captain (Sir) John Wrottesley – died Replaced by Earl Gower 1787	
Stamford (seat 1/2)	Sir George Howard	
Stamford (seat 2/2)	Henry Cecil	
Steyning (seat 1/2)	Sir John Honywood – resigned Replaced by Thomas Edwards Freeman 1785 – died Replaced by Sir John Honywood 1788	
Steyning (seat 2/2)	Hon. Richard Howard	
Stirling Burghs (seat 1/1)	James Campbell – resigned Replaced by Archibald Campbell 1789	
Stirlingshire (seat 1/1)	Sir Thomas Dundas	Pro-Admin Whig
Stockbridge (seat 1/2)	Thomas Boothby Parkyns	
Stockbridge (seat 2/2)	Captain the Hon. John Luttrell – took office Replaced by James Gordon 1785	
Sudbury (seat 1/2)	William Smith	
Sudbury (seat 2/2)	John Langston	
Suffolk (seat 1/2)	Joshua Grigby	
Suffolk (seat 2/2)	Sir John Rous, Bt	
Surrey (seat 1/2)	Hon. William Norton – succeeded to peerage Replaced by Lord William Russell 1789	
Surrey (seat 2/2)	Sir Joseph Mawbey, Bt	
Sussex (seat 1/2)	Thomas Pelham	
Sussex (seat 2/2)	Lord George Henry Lennox	
Sutherland (seat 1/1)	William Wemyss – resigned Replaced by James Grant 1787	
== T ==
Tain Burghs (seat 1/1)	Charles James Fox – sat for Westminster; Replaced by George Ross 1786 – died Replaced by Sir Charles Lockhart-Ross, Bt 1786	
Tamworth (seat 1/2)	John Courtenay	
Tamworth (seat 2/2)	John Calvert II	
Taunton (seat 1/2)	Alexander Popham	
Taunton (seat 2/2)	(Sir) Benjamin Hammet	
Tavistock (seat 1/2)	Richard Rigby – died Replaced by Lord John Russell 1788	
Tavistock (seat 2/2)	Hon. Richard Fitzpatrick	
Tewkesbury (seat 1/2)	James Martin	
Tewkesbury (seat 2/2)	Sir William Codrington, Bt	Tory
Thetford (seat 1/2)	Sir Charles Kent, Bt	
Thetford (seat 2/2)	George Jennings	
Thirsk (seat 1/2)	Sir Thomas Frankland, Bt – died Replaced by Robert Vyner 1785	
Thirsk (seat 2/2)	Sir Gregory Page-Turner	
Tiverton (seat 1/2)	Hon. Dudley Ryder	
Tiverton (seat 2/2)	John Duntze	
Totnes (seat 1/2)	Philip Jennings – died Replaced by Viscount Barnard 1788	
Totnes (seat 2/2)	The Hon. Henry Phipps	
Tregony (seat 1/2)	Lloyd Kenyon – ennobled Replaced by Hon. Hugh Seymour Conway 1788	
Tregony (seat 2/2)	Robert Kingsmill	
Truro (seat 1/2)	William Macarmick – took office Replaced by John Hiley Addington 1787	
Truro (seat 2/2)	William Augustus Spencer Boscawen	
== W ==
Wallingford (seat 1/2)	Thomas Aubrey	
Wallingford (seat 2/2)	Sir Francis Sykes, Bt	
Wareham (seat 1/2)	Charles Lefebure – resigned Replaced by John Calcraft 1786	
Wareham (seat 2/2)	Thomas Farrer	
Warwick (seat 1/2)	Hon. Charles Greville	
Warwick (seat 2/2)	Robert Ladbroke	
Warwickshire (seat 1/2)	Sir Robert Lawley, Bt	
Warwickshire (seat 2/2)	Sir George Shuckburgh, Bt	
Wells (seat 1/2)	William Thomas Beckford	
Wells (seat 2/2)	Clement Tudway	
Wendover (seat 1/2)	Robert Burton	
Wendover (seat 2/2)	John Ord	
Wenlock (seat 1/2)	Sir Henry Bridgeman	
Wenlock (seat 2/2)	John Bridgeman (later Simpson) – resigned Replaced by George Forester 1785	
Weobley (seat 1/2)	Andrew Bayntun-Rolt – resigned Replaced by Hon. Thomas Thynne 1786	
Weobley (seat 2/2)	(Sir) John Scott	
Westbury (seat 1/2)	Chaloner Arcedeckne – resigned Replaced by John Madocks 1786	
Westbury (seat 2/2)	Samuel Estwick	
West Looe (seat 1/2)	John Scott	
West Looe (seat 2/2)	John Lemon – resigned Replaced by James Adams 1784	
Westminster (seat 1/2)	Samuel Hood – took office Replaced by Lord John Townshend 1788	
Westminster (seat 2/2)	Charles James Fox	
Westmorland (seat 1/2)	James Lowther	
Westmorland (seat 2/2)	Sir Michael le Fleming	
Weymouth and Melcombe Regis (seat 1/4)	Welbore Ellis	
Weymouth and Melcombe Regis (seat 2/4)	Sir Thomas Rumbold	
Weymouth and Melcombe Regis (seat 3/4)	John Purling	
Weymouth and Melcombe Regis (seat 4/4)	Gabriel Steward – resigned Replaced by George Jackson 1786– resigned Replaced by Gabriel Steward 1788	
Whitchurch (seat 1/2)	The Viscount Midleton	
Whitchurch (seat 2/2)	William Selwyn	
Wigan (seat 1/2)	Orlando Bridgeman	
Wigan (seat 2/2)	John Cotes	
Wigtown Burghs (seat 1/1)	William Dalrymple (1736–1807)	
Wigtownshire (seat 1/1)	Keith Stewart – took office Replaced by Andrew McDouall 1784	
Wilton (seat 1/2)	Lord Herbert – took office Replaced by Lieutenant-Colonel Philip Goldsworthy 1785– resigned Replaced by Lord Herbert 1788	
Wilton (seat 2/2)	William Gerard Hamilton	
Wiltshire (seat 1/2)	Charles Penruddocke – died Replaced by Sir James Tylney-Long 1788	
Wiltshire (seat 2/2)	Ambrose Goddard	
Winchelsea (seat 1/2)	William Nedham	
Winchelsea (seat 2/2)	John Nesbitt	
Winchester (seat 1/2)	Henry Penton	
Winchester (seat 2/2)	Richard Grace Gamon	
Wootton Bassett (seat 1/2)	Hon. George North	
Wootton Bassett (seat 2/2)	Hon. Robert Seymour Conway	
Worcester (seat 1/2)	William Ward – succeeded to peerage Replaced by Edmund Wigley 1789	
Worcester (seat 2/2)	Samuel Smith	
Worcestershire (seat 1/2)	Edward Foley	
Worcestershire (seat 2/2)	William Lygon	
== Y ==
Yarmouth (Isle of Wight) (seat 1/2)	Edward Morant – resigned Replaced by Thomas Clarke Jervoise 1787	
Yarmouth (Isle of Wight) (seat 2/2)	Philip Francis	
York (seat 1/2)	The Viscount Galway	
York (seat 2/2)	Richard Slater Milnes	
Yorkshire (seat 1/2)	Henry Duncombe	
Yorkshire (seat 2/2)	William Wilberforce	

== By-elections ==
- List of Great Britain by-elections (1774–90)

== See also ==
- 1784 British general election
- List of parliaments of Great Britain
- Unreformed House of Commons
