= Buxton baronets of Shadwell Lodge (1800) =

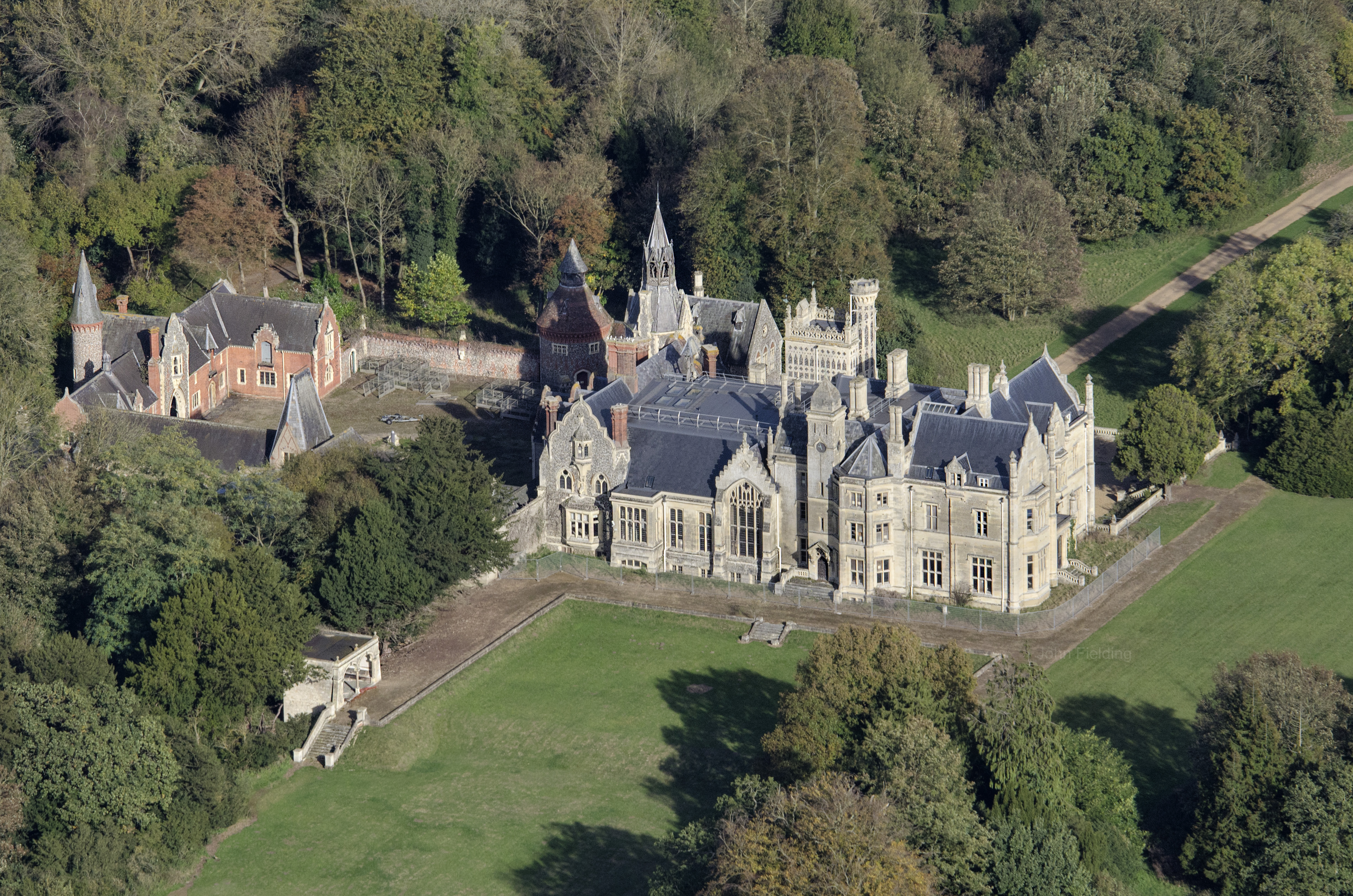
Shadwell Court, formerly Shadwell Lodge, 2019 photograph

The Buxton baronetcy, of Shadwell Lodge in the County of Norfolk, was created in the Baronetage of Great Britain on 25 November 1800 for Robert Buxton, a political supporter and personal friend of William Pitt the younger. He was Member of Parliament for Thetford 1790–96 and for Great Bedwyn 1797–1806.

His son the 2nd Baronet represented Great Bedwyn from 1818 to 1832, and served as High Sheriff of Norfolk in 1841. The 3rd Baronet was member for South Norfolk from 1871 to 1885, and High Sheriff in 1870. The baronetcy became extinct on his death, leaving no male heir, in 1888.

== Buxton baronets, of Shadwell Lodge (1800) ==
- Sir Robert John Buxton, 1st Baronet (1753–1839)
- Sir John Jacob Buxton, 2nd Baronet (1788–1842)
- Sir Robert Jacob Buxton, 3rd Baronet (1829–1888)

== Extended family ==
Maud Isabel Buxton (1866–1949), daughter of the 3rd Baronet, had in the family estates of 9,309 acres (3,767 ha) in Norfolk, and land in Suffolk and Wiltshire, a "troubled inheritance" at the time of the great depression of British agriculture. She sold the Norfolk estates in 1898, to John Musker, partner with Julius Drew in Home and Colonial Stores.

== Notes ==
Baronetage of Great Britain
Preceded by Kingsmill baronets	Buxton baronets of Shadwell Lodge; 25 November 1800	Succeeded by Elford baronets
