= Robert Kingsmill =

Robert Kingsmill may refer to:

- Sir Robert Kingsmill, 1st Baronet (1730–1805), Royal Navy admiral
- Sir Robert Kingsmill, 2nd Baronet (1772–1823), politician and landowner
