= Shadwell Court =

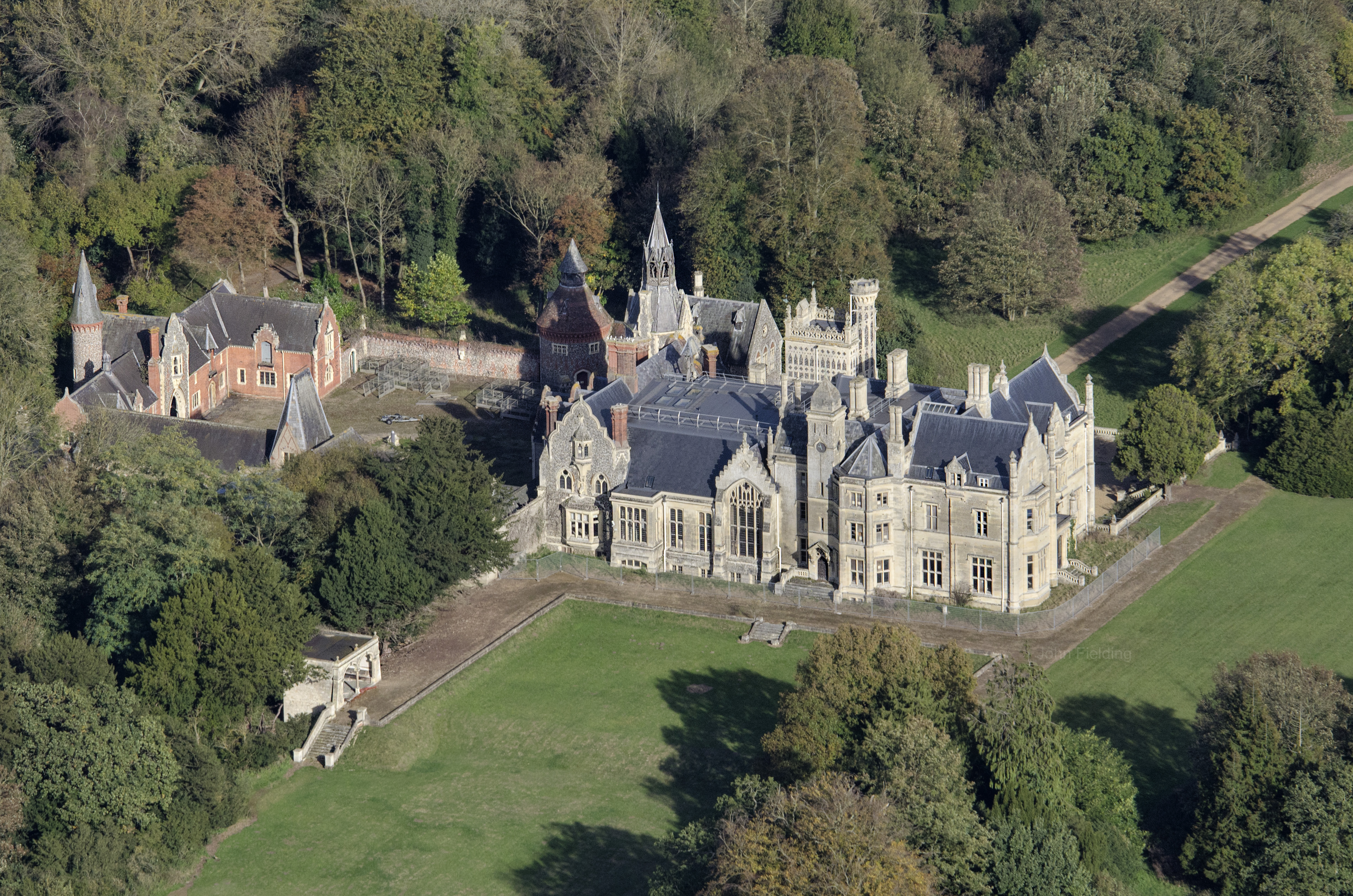
- Shadwell Court (seen in 2014) is considered an outstanding example of Victorian architecture.

- Location within Norfolk
- 52.4118°N 0.8343°E
- Type: Country house
- Location: Brettenham, Norfolk

Site notes
- Architect(s): Edward Blore, Samuel Sanders Teulon
- Architectural style: Victorian
- Governing body: Privately owned

Listed Building – Grade I
- Official name: Shadwell Court
- Designated: 18 March 1983
- Reference no.: 1076940

Listed Building – Grade II*
- Official name: Clock Tower north of Shadwell Court
- Designated: 18 March 1983
- Reference no.: 1342781

Listed Building – Grade II
- Official name: Brewery north of Shadwell Court
- Designated: 18 March 1983
- Reference no.: 1076901

Listed Building – Grade II
- Official name: Two Stable Ranges north and northwest of Shadwell Court
- Designated: 18 March 1983
- Reference no.: 1076903

Listed Building – Grade II
- Official name: Fountain in court north of Shadwell Court
- Designated: 18 March 1983
- Reference no.: 1076902

Shadwell Court is a country house in Brettenham, Norfolk, England, dating originally from the 18th century. Built for the Buxton baronets, the house was massively enlarged in two stages in the 19th century; in 1840–42 by Edward Blore and then in 1856–60 by Samuel Sanders Teulon. The house and grounds now form part of the Shadwell Nunnery Stud, owned by Hamdan bin Rashid Al Maktoum until his death in March 2021.

Shadwell Court is a Grade I listed building and was called a "work of genius" and "a dazzling display of Victorian fireworks" by historian Mark Girouard. In 2019, the court was included in the Heritage at Risk Register due to concerns over the deterioration of its fabric.

== History ==
The Buxton baronetage was created for Robert Buxton in 1800. His grandfather, John Buxton along with his distant relative Edward Lovett Pearce, had built the original court, then named Shadwell Lodge, in 1727–29 as a retreat from the main family house, Channonz Hall at Tibenham. The family's fortunes had been established by Robert Buxton (1533-1607), a successful lawyer in the service of the Duke of Norfolk. In 1841 the second baronet engaged Edward Blore to undertake a major enlargement of the house, which was completed for his widow in 1843. (Note: The architectural historian Mark Girouard describes Emily Chomeley, the second baronet's window, as "a character out of a Trollope novel, a dowager both formidable and slightly absurd, moving through life in an aureole of good works and admiring clergymen".) On their son's majority in 1850, the third baronet followed the Victorian tradition of embellishing the local church, and endowing a school, before embarking on a further enlargement of his home. The church at Brettenham, the Old College at Rushford, and the work at the court were all entrusted to Samuel Sanders Teulon.

The costs of the Teulon rebuilding were considerable and may have contributed to the sale of the house and estate in 1898. (Note: Although the expenditure was vast, the extra living accommodation achieved was not in proportion; the dowager Lady Buxton, who continued to live at the court throughout her son's life, acknowledged, "the house will have a very imposing effect - and yet a few Batchelor Rooms is all the addition that we gain".) The Buxtons had never been a hugely rich family; Jill Franklin, in her study The Gentleman's Country House And Its Plan: 1835–1914, records the income from their 10,000 acre estate in the mid-19th century as £7,260 per year. In contrast, the buyer of the estate, John Musker, was a very successful grocer who founded the Home and Colonial Stores in partnership with Julius Drewe. (Note: While Musker used his fortune to purchase an established country estate, Drewe wanted a new-build and employed Edwin Lutyens to design Castle Drogo in Devon.) The Muskers owned the estate until the 1980s, when it was sold to Hamdan bin Rashid Al Maktoum who incorporated it into his Nunnery Stud, based at Thetford. The court has not been lived in since the 1990s, and in 2019 it was placed on the Heritage at Risk Register over concerns as to its condition. The then director of The Victorian Society, Christopher Costelloe suggested, "Shadwell Court's owner can easily afford to look after this important building properly. This major country house has been neglected for far too long and it will be a scandal if it isn't put right soon". The Shadwell Stud contested the allegations of neglect, noting that over £1.6M had been spent on conserving the structure since its purchase by the Al Maktoum family.

The Shadwell estate is private and is not publicly accessible.

== Architecture and description ==
The original Shadwell Lodge, built around 1727 for, and designed by, John Buxton, was to a standard Georgian plan, comprising three bays and three storeys. There are suggestions that John Soane undertook work at the house in the 1790s, but the Historic England listing does not record this. (Note: The relevant Norfolk Pevsner suggests that Sloane drew up plans for enlargement but that these were not enacted.) Due to financial constraints, the original lodge was not demolished, and the two periods of Victorian expansion saw first Blore, and then Teulon, envelop it with their own enlargements. Blore's work saw the construction of a southern, two-storey, block on the garden façade, together with the building of a service wing to the north. Teulon's extensions of the 1850s saw the reconstruction of the entrance front, and the building of a large stable range, with a colossal entrance gateway topped by a tower.

The result of Blore's, and then Teulon's, efforts, is decidedly vertiginous; Historic England notes the "balanced asymmetry and strikingly punctuated skyline". The building is of three storeys on some fronts, and four on others, with a range of turrets and towers. Jill Franklin notes the diagonal staircase tower as one of the earliest examples of its type. The building materials are Caen stone, brick and flint, with slate used for roofing. The climax of the interior is Teulon's cruciform central hall, with stained glass, an organ and a timber roof with elaborate carving by Thomas Earp. Mark Girouard, the architectural historian, considers Shadwell among Teulon's best work; "a dazzling display of Victorian fireworks, in its way a work of genius".

The grounds contain a grotto, constructed around a mediaeval well dedicated to St Chad from which the estate derives its name.

=== Listing designations ===
Historic England is the statutory body with responsibility for the listing of buildings in England. It uses a three-tier rating system, classifying listed buildings into three categories; Grade I, the highest grade, for buildings of “exceptional interest”, Grade II*, the next grade, for buildings of “more than special interest”, and Grade II, the lowest grade, for buildings of “special interest”.

Shadwell Court is a Grade I-listed building. The Clock Tower entrance to Teulon's stable courtyard is listed Grade II*, while the stables themselves, a brewery, a game larder, and a fountain, all in the stable courtyard, are listed Grade II. The gardens of Shadwell Court are designated Grade II on the Register of Historic Parks and Gardens, while an eighteenth-century wall, dating from the time of the original lodge, and a gardener's cottage, possibly by Blore, are designated Grade II.

== Sources ==
- Franklin, Jill (1981). The Gentleman's Country House and its Plan 1835–1914. London, UK: Routledge & Kegan Paul. ISBN 978-0-710-00622-6.
- Girouard, Mark (1979). The Victorian Country House. New Haven, US and London: Yale University Press. ISBN 978-0-300-02390-9.
- Headley, Gwyn; Meulenkamp, Wim (1999). Follies, Grottoes and Garden Buildings. London: Aurum Press. ISBN 978-1-854-10625-4. OCLC 1008038820.
- Pevsner, Nikolaus; Wilson, Bill (2002). Norfolk 2: North-west and South. The Buildings Of England. New Haven, US and London: Yale University Press. ISBN 978-0-300-09657-6. OCLC 1101266459.
