= Sir John Buxton, 2nd Baronet =

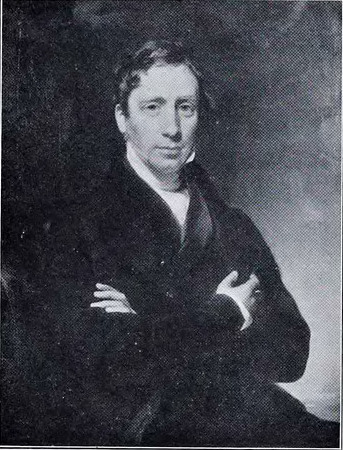
- portrait by Henry Perronet Briggs

2nd Baronet
- In office 1839–1842

Member of the British Parliament for Great Bedwyn
- In office 1818–1832

Personal details
- Born: 13 August 1788
- Died: 13 October 1842 (aged 54) Tunbridge Wells, Kent
- Spouse: Elizabeth Cholmeley
- Children: 3, including Sir Robert Buxton, 3rd Baronet
- Parent: Sir Robert Buxton, 1st Baronet (father)

Sir John Jacob Buxton, 2nd Baronet (13 August 1788 – 13 October 1842) was a politician from Shadwell Court in Brettenham, Norfolk, who sat in the House of Commons from 1818 to 1832.

Buxton was the eldest son of Sir Robert Buxton, 1st Baronet and his wife Juliana Mary Beevor. He was educated at Harrow School and at Christ Church, Oxford.

He led the life of well-to-do Victorian country gentlemen, and concentrated on his estates, administrative offices and charitable work in the county and the cultivation of an agreeable social life. Buxton was elected Member of Parliament for Great Bedwyn in 1818 and held the seat until it was replaced under the Great Reform Act in 1832. He succeeded to the title of 2nd Baronet Buxton, of Shadwell Lodge, Norfolk on 7 June 1839 and was High Sheriff of Norfolk in 1841. He enlarged Shadwell Lodge to the designs of Edward Blore, one of the leading architects of the time and the house was enlarged and remodelled in the Jacobean style between 1840 and 1842.

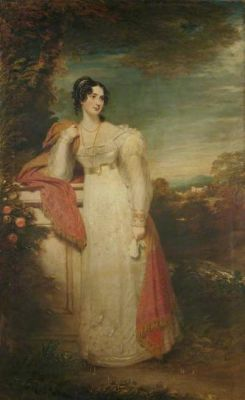
Elizabeth Cholmeley by William Beechey, 1825, Norfolk Museums & Archaeology Service (Norwich Castle Museum & Art Gallery)

Buxton died aged 54 at Tunbridge Wells, Kent. He married Elizabeth Cholmeley, daughter of Sir Montague Cholmeley, 1st Baronet and Elizabeth Harrison, on 5 August 1825 at St. George's Church, St. George Street, Hanover Square, London. His son Robert succeeded him in the baronetcy. His daughter Elizabeth married Walter Spencer-Stanhope.

Parliament of the United Kingdom
Preceded by John Nicholl; James Henry Leigh	Member of Parliament for Great Bedwyn; 1818–1832; With: John Nicholl	Constituency abolished
Honorary titles
Preceded by Henry Villebois	High Sheriff of Norfolk; 1841	Succeeded by William Howe Windham
Baronetage of Great Britain
Preceded by Robert Buxton	Baronet (of Shadwell Lodge); 1839–1842	Succeeded by Robert Buxton
