= Henry Temple, 2nd Viscount Palmerston =

British politician (1739–1802)

Henry Temple, 2nd Viscount Palmerston, FRS (4 December 1739 – 17 April 1802), was a British politician.

== Life ==
Temple was a son of Henry Temple (son of Henry Temple, 1st Viscount Palmerston) and Jane, daughter of Sir John Barnard, Lord Mayor of London.

He was born into 'the Ascendancy', the Anglo-Irish aristocracy. His family owned a vast country estate in the north of County Sligo in the west of Ireland. He succeeded to the peerage in 1757, and was educated at Clare College, Cambridge from 1757 to 1759.

As a member of the British House of Commons, he represented the constituencies of East Looe between 1762 and 1768, Southampton between 1768 and 1774, Hastings between 1774 and 1784, Boroughbridge between 1784 and 1790, Newport, Isle of Wight between 1790 and 1796, and Winchester between 1796 and his death in 1802.

He was appointed to the Board of Trade in 1765, was a Lord Commissioner of the Admiralty between 1766 and 1777, and was a Lord of the Treasury from 1777 to 1782.

In 1763 Temple journeyed to Italy, staying with Voltaire at Ferney en route. He reached Rome in 1764, and from there visited Paestum, south of Naples. He bought antiquities and paintings from Gavin Hamilton, antiquities from Giovanni Battista Piranesi, paintings from Angelica Kauffman, cameos from Giovanni Pichler and sculpture from Joseph Nollekens.

He died on 17 April 1802 at his house in Hanover Square, Westminster, and was buried at Romsey Abbey with a monument by John Flaxman.

He was a lover of the famous courtesan Kitty Kennedy.

He left behind his wife and children. His son, Henry John Temple, 3rd Viscount Palmerston, was Prime Minister of the United Kingdom in the mid-19th century.

A portrait of Henry Temple by Angelica Kauffman is held at Broadlands, Hampshire.

== Arms ==
Coat of arms of Henry Temple, 2nd Viscount Palmerston
Crest A talbot sejant sable, collared and lined or. Escutcheon Quarterly 1st & 4th, Or, an eagle displayed sable (for Leofric, Earl of Mercia); 2nd & 3rd Argent, two bars sable, each charged with three martlets or (Temple). Supporters Dexter, a lion regardant pean; Sinister, a horse regardant argent, maned, tailed and hoofed or. Motto Flecti non frangi (To be bent, not broken).

Parliament of Great Britain
Preceded by Francis Gashry; John Buller	Member of Parliament for East Looe; 1762–1768; With: John Buller	Succeeded by Richard Hussey; John Buller
Preceded by Henry Dawkins; Hans Stanley	Member of Parliament for Southampton; 1768–1774; With: Hans Stanley	Succeeded by John Fleming; Hans Stanley
Preceded by Samuel Martin; William Ashburnham	Member of Parliament for Hastings; 1774–1784; With: Charles Jenkinson; John Ord	Succeeded by John Stanley; John Dawes
Preceded by Anthony Eyre; Charles Ambler	Member of Parliament for Boroughbridge; 1784–1790; With: Sir Richard Sutton, Bt	Succeeded by Morris Robinson; Sir Richard Sutton, Bt
Preceded by Edward Rushworth; George Byng	Member of Parliament for Newport; 1790–1796; With: Viscount Melbourne to 1793; Peniston Lamb from 1793	Succeeded by Jervoise Clarke Jervoise; Edward Rushworth
Preceded by Henry Penton; Richard Grace Gamon	Member of Parliament for Winchester; 1796–1800; With: Richard Grace Gamon	Succeeded by Parliament of the United Kingdom
Parliament of the United Kingdom
Preceded by Parliament of Great Britain	Member of Parliament for Winchester; 1801; With: Richard Grace Gamon	Succeeded by Sir Henry St John-Mildmay, Bt; Richard Grace Gamon
Peerage of Ireland
Preceded by Henry Temple	Viscount Palmerston; 1757–1802	Succeeded by Henry Temple
