= James Patrick Murray (British Army officer) =

British soldier

Major-General James Patrick Murray
- Born: 21 January 1782; Livorno, Grand Duchy of Tuscany
- Died: 5 December 1834 (aged 52); Killenure, Ireland
- Relatives: General James Murray (father)
- Military career
- Allegiance: Kingdom of Great Britain
- Branch: British Army
- Service years: 1797–1830
- Rank: Major-General
- Conflicts: War of the Second Coalition; Anglo-Russian invasion of Holland; Ferrol Expedition; Peninsular War
- Other work: Member of Parliament for Yarmouth (1802–03)

Major-General James Patrick Murray (21 January 1782 – 5 December 1834) was a British Army officer who served briefly as a Member of Parliament (MP), despite being under age.

== Family and early life ==
Murray was born in Leghorn, the oldest son of General James Murray (1721–1794) of Beauport Park. His mother was Ann Witham, his father's second wife. His father was the fifth son of Alexander Murray, 4th Lord Elibank.

He was educated at Westminster School, and in 1803 he married Elizabeth Rushworth, daughter of Rev Edward Rushworth of Freshwater House. They had 6 sons and 6 daughters.

== Career ==
Murray joined the British Army in 1797, rising to the rank of major general before he retired in 1830. He served with his relative Sir James Pulteney in the Anglo-Russian invasion of Holland and the Ferrol Expedition. He lost the use of his right arm during the Peninsular War, and retired to his home at Killenure near Athlone in Ireland.

At the general election in July 1802, Murray was elected to the House of Commons as a Member of Parliament (MP) for the rotten borough of Yarmouth on the Isle of Wight. At the time he was only 20 years old, even though the minimum age for MPs was 21 until 2006. His election appears to have been only as a place-holder on behalf of Lord Holmes, the clergyman-peer who was patron of the borough. Murray resigned his seat in early 1803, by the procedural device of accepting appointment to the sinecure of Steward of the Manor of East Hendred.

Parliament of the United Kingdom
Preceded by Jervoise Clarke Jervoise; William Peachy	Member of Parliament for Yarmouth, Isle of Wight; 1802–1803; With: Jervoise Clarke Jervoise	Succeeded by Jervoise Clarke Jervoise; Charles Macdonnell
