= John Ord =

18th/19th century English barrister and politician

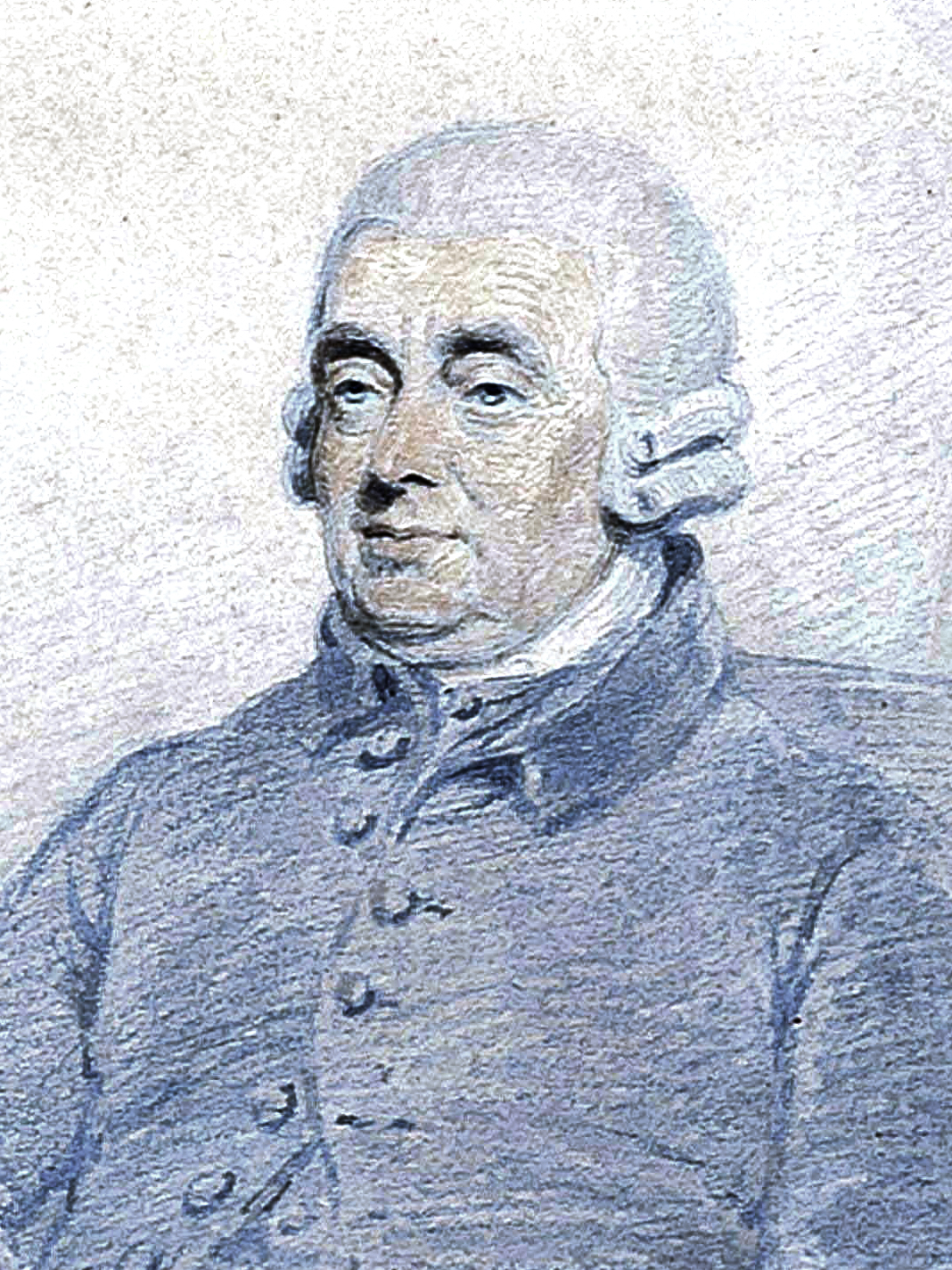
John Ord (Henry Edridge, 1806)

John Ord (1729–1814) was an English barrister and politician who sat in the House of Commons from 1774 to 1790.

== Life ==
The son of Robert Ord and Mary Darnell, he was educated at Newcome's School in Hackney and Trinity College, Cambridge. He graduated B.A. in 1750, and then held a lay fellowship.

Called to the bar at Lincoln's Inn, Ord in 1777 became Attorney-General of the Duchy of Lancaster, and in 1778 master in chancery. He stood unsuccessfully for Morpeth in 1761. He was Member of Parliament for Midhurst, Hastings, and Wendover (1774–1790), and was some time chairman of ways and means in the House of Commons.

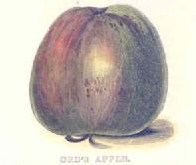
Ord's Apple

Ord was known also for his garden at Purser's Cross near Fulham in London, which he laid out in 1756, and where exotic trees grew. The variety "Ord's Apple" was raised there by his sister-in-law Anne Simpson. Also known as "Simpson's Pippin" or "Simpson's Seedling", it was from seed of the Newtown Pippin.

Ord was a member of the Horticultural Society, and from 1780 a Fellow of the Royal Society. He died on 6 June 1814, and was buried in Fulham churchyard.

== Notes ==
Attribution

This article incorporates text from a publication now in the public domain: Lee, Sidney, ed. (1895). "Ord, Robert". Dictionary of National Biography. Vol. 42. London: Smith, Elder & Co.

Parliament of Great Britain
Preceded by Herbert Mackworth; Clement Tudway	Member of Parliament for Midhurst; 1774 –1780; With: Hon. Henry Seymour-Conway	Succeeded by Hon. John St John; Hon. Henry Drummond
Preceded by Henry Temple; Charles Jenkinson	Member of Parliament for Hastings; 1780–1784; With: Henry Temple	Succeeded by John Dawes; John Stanley
Preceded by Richard Smith; John Mansell Smith	Member of Parliament for Wendover; 1784–1790; With: Robert Burton	Succeeded by John Barker Church; Hon. Hugh Seymour-Conway
