= John Stanley (Hastings MP) =

British MP and lawyer (1740– 1799)

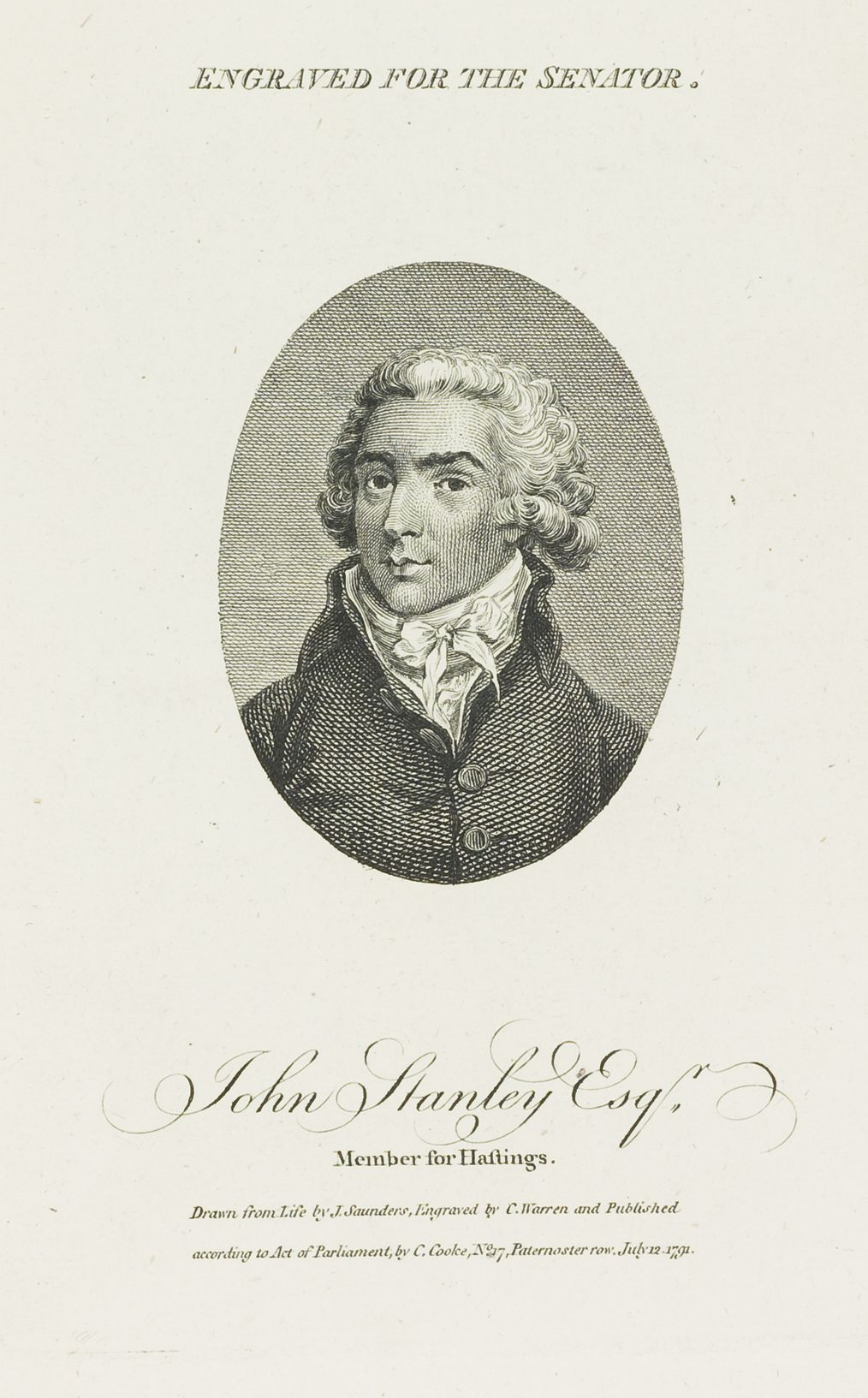
John Stanley

John Stanley (1740 – 1 April 1799) was a British politician and colonial lawyer.

He was born the eldest son of Michael Stanley of St. John's on the Caribbean island of Nevis and sent to London to be trained in the law at the Inns of Court in 1758, where he was called to the bar in 1761. He was made bencher in 1797. He returned to the West Indies to practise law and was appointed Solicitor-General of the Leeward Islands for 1771-81 and Attorney General of the Leeward Islands for 1781–99. He was President of the council for 1793–95.

He was elected Member of Parliament for Hastings from 1784 until 1796.

He died in 1799. He had married Susanna, the daughter of Lewis Feuilleteau and the widow of Henry Brouncker of St. Kitts. He had one son who predeceased him.

Parliament of Great Britain
Preceded by Viscount Palmerston; John Ord	Member of Parliament for Hastings; 1784–1796; With: John Dawes 1784–90; Richard Arden 1790–94; Robert Dundas 1794–96	Succeeded by Sir James Sanderson, Bt; Nicholas Vansittart
