= Sir Robert Buxton, 1st Baronet =

British politician

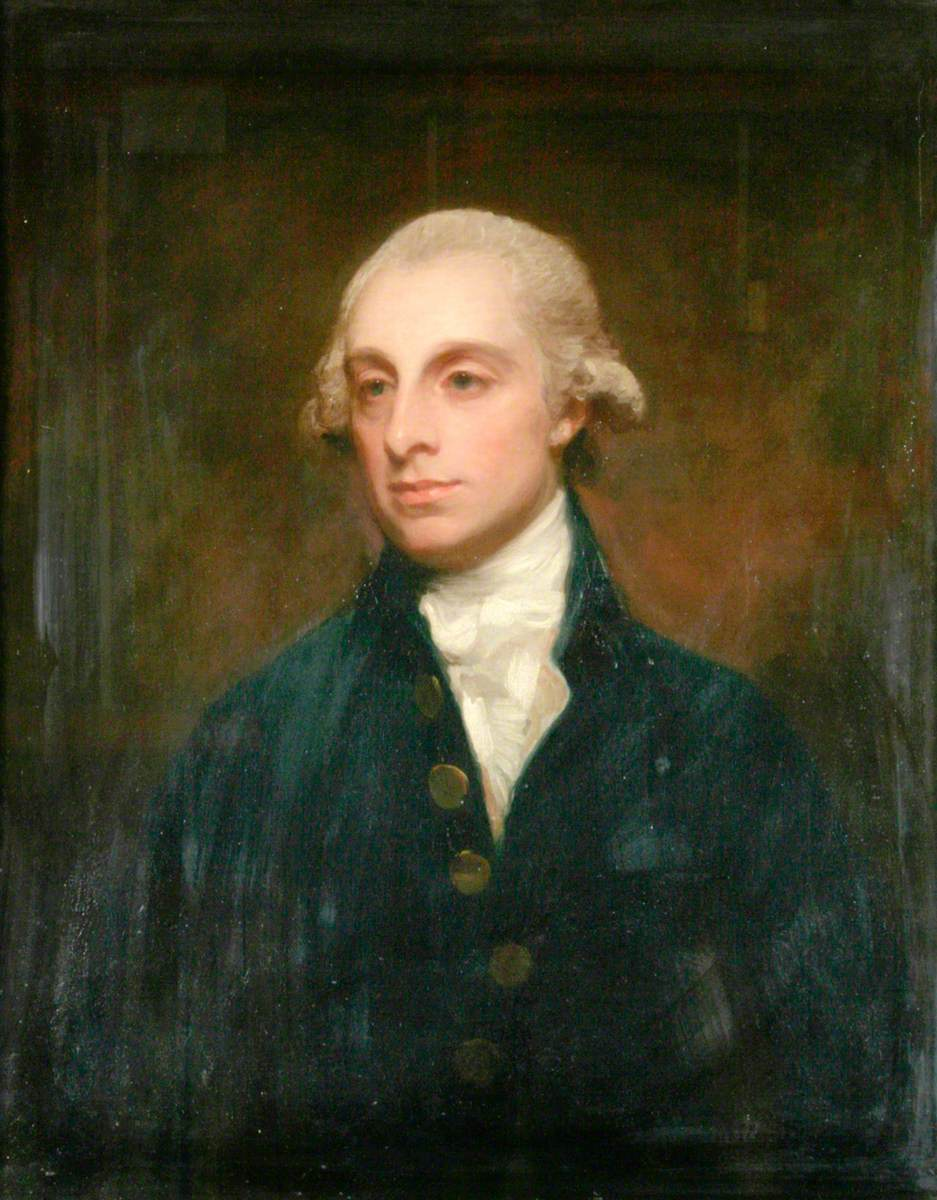
- portrait by George Romney

1st Baronet
- In office 1800–1839

Member of the British Parliament for Great Bedwyn
- In office 1797–1806

Member of the British Parliament for Thetford
- In office 1790–1796

Personal details
- Born: 27 October 1753 Rushford, Norfolk, England
- Died: 7 June 1839 (aged 85)
- Spouse: Juliana Mary Beevor
- Children: 3, including Sir John Buxton, 2nd Baronet
- Occupation: politician, abolitionist

Sir Robert John Buxton, 1st Baronet (27 October 1753 – 7 June 1839) was an English politician and abolitionist who sat in the House of Commons between 1790 and 1806.

Buxton was born at Rushford, Norfolk, the son of John Buxton and his wife Elizabeth Jacob and grandson of John Buxton who designed and built Shadwell Court at Rushford.

The Norfolk Buxtons are thought to have taken their name from the Norfolk village of that name and to have descended from Robert Buxton MP (1533–1607) an attorney in the service of Thomas Duke of Norfolk. His father was an ill-tempered character during his last years, which made the relationship between father and son increasingly difficult. Buxton was expelled from Shadwell and his father severely cut his income after he married without his father's consent. They were reconciled by 1779, three years before his father's death.

Buxton was elected Member of Parliament (MP) for Thetford in 1790 and held the seat until 1796. In 1797 he was elected MP for Great Bedwyn and held the seat until 1806. He was a loyal supporter of William Pitt. He campaigned openly for the abolition of slavery throughout his political career, and on several occasions advocated prison reform. In 1802, he supported Sir Robert Peel's proposals to regulate child labour. On behalf of the landed interest, he opposed measures such as the regulation of labourers' wages or the sale of corn in the public market. He was a fervent patriot and supported the government's war effort where possible. He backed the increase of the militia and the Additional Force Act 1804 (44 Geo. 3. c. 56). He was created a Baronet of Shadwell Court in the County of Norfolk on 25 November 1800. He married Juliana Mary Beevor, daughter of Sir Thomas Beevor, 1st Bt. and Elizabeth Branthwaite, on 22 May 1777 at St. George's Church, St. George Street, Hanover Square, London.

Buxton died at age 85 at Shadwell Lodge, Norfolk. His son John succeeded to the baronetcy.

Parliament of Great Britain
Preceded by Sir Charles Kent; George Jennings	Member of Parliament for Thetford; 1790–1796; With: Joseph Randyll Burch	Succeeded by John Harrison; Joseph Randyll Burch
Preceded by John Wodehouse; Thomas Bruce	Member of Parliament for Great Bedwyn; 1796–1801; With: John Wodehouse 1797–1801	Succeeded by Parliament of the United Kingdom
Parliament of the United Kingdom
Preceded by Parliament of Great Britain	Member of Parliament for Great Bedwyn; 1801–1806; With: John Wodehouse 1801–1802; Sir Nathaniel Holland 1802–1806	Succeeded by Viscount Stopford; James Henry Leigh
Baronetage of Great Britain
New creation	Baronet (of Shadwell Lodge); 1800–1839	Succeeded by John Buxton
