= Kingsmill baronets =

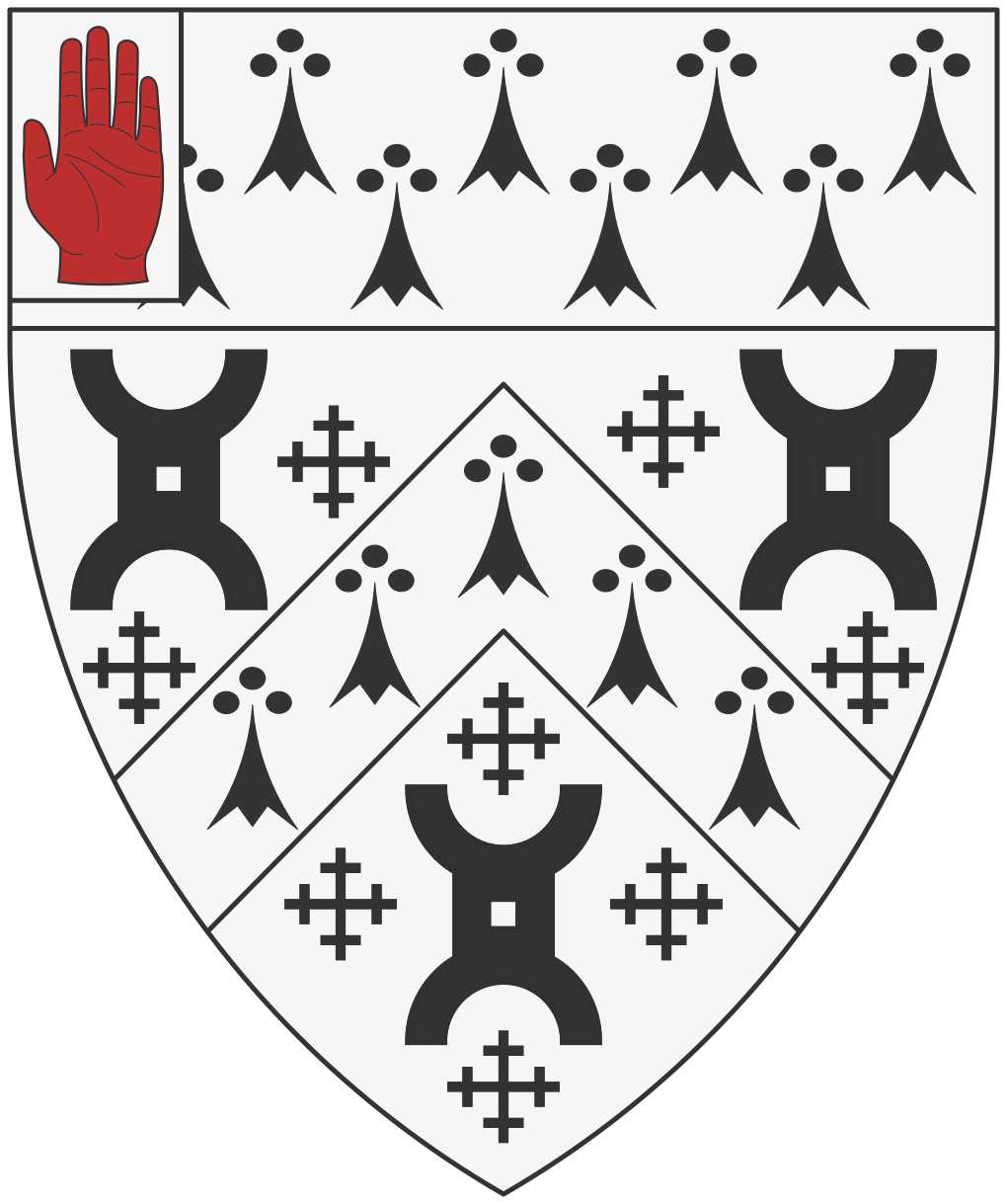
Escutcheon of the Kingsmill baronets of Sidmanton

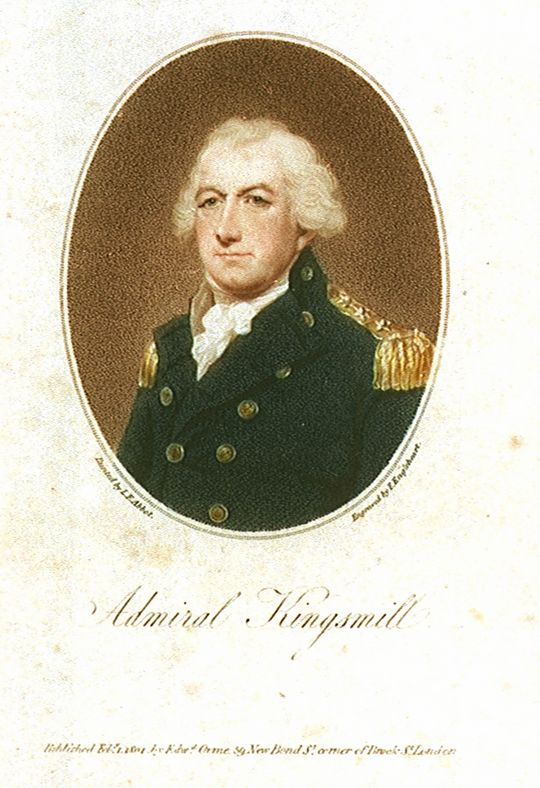
Sir Robert Kingsmill, 1st Baronet

The Kingsmill baronetcy, of Sidmanton in the County of Southampton, was a title in the Baronetage of Great Britain, created on 24 November 1800 for Robert Kingsmill, Admiral of the Royal Navy. There was a special remainder to the male issue of his late brother Edward Kingsmill.

Kingsmill died in 1805, and the baronetcy descended under the special remainder to his nephew, Robert Kingsmill, the 2nd Baronet. The title became extinct on the latter's death on 4 May 1823.

== Kingsmill baronets, of Sidmanton (1800) ==
- Sir Robert Kingsmill, 1st Baronet (1730–1805)
- Sir Robert Kingsmill, 2nd Baronet (1772–1823)

Baronetage of Great Britain
Preceded by Glyn baronets	Kingsmill baronets of Sidmanton; 24 November 1800	Succeeded by Buxton baronets
