= Jeremiah Crutchley =

English politician (1745–1805)

Member of the Parliament of Great Britain for Horsham
- In office 1784–1790

Member of the Parliament of Great Britain for Grampound
- In office 1790–1796

Member of the Parliament of Great Britain for St Mawes
- In office 28 October 1796 – 1802

Personal details
- Born: 20 December 1745
- Died: 28 December 1805 (aged 60)

Jeremiah Crutchley (20 December 1745 – 28 December 1805) was an English politician who served as a Member of Parliament (MP).

== Biography ==
Crutchley was born into the Crutchley family of Sunninghill Park. His father, of the same name, is buried at Lewisham and his grave at Lee Old Churchyard is a Grade II listed building.

In Parliament, Crutchley supported William Pitt the Younger. He was High Sheriff of Berkshire from 1773 to 1774.

== See also ==
- List of MPs in the first United Kingdom Parliament
- List of MPs elected in the 1796 British general election
- List of MPs elected in the 1784 British general election
- List of MPs elected in the 1790 British general election
