= Sir Robert Kingsmill, 2nd Baronet =

English landowner and politician

Sir Robert Kingsmill, 2nd Baronet (1772 – 4 May 1823) was an English landowner and politician.

He was born the son of Edward Kingsmill (assumed the surname of Kingsmill in lieu of Brice, December 1787), of Belfast, and his wife Catherine. He was the nephew of Robert Brice Kingsmill, who rose to be an admiral in the Royal Navy. He married Elizabeth Newman in 1796, and with his wife he had two daughters, Elizabeth Catherine Kingsmill, born in September 1797, and Anna Maria Kingsmill, born on 12 January 1800. He succeeded to the Kingsmill baronetcy on his uncle's death without issue on 23 November 1805, and settling at the family seat in Sydmonton he became an important local landowner, serving as High Sheriff of Hampshire in 1811. His wife died on 4 October 1817, with his youngest daughter, Anna Maria, dying in April the following year. He moved his seat to Aston, Gloucestershire, and died in London on 4 May 1823. He died without male issue and the baronetcy became extinct. His only surviving daughter, Elizabeth, married Sir John Kingsmill in 1824.

== Notes ==
Honorary titles
Preceded by Sir James Gardiner	High Sheriff of Hampshire; 1811	Unknown
Baronetage of Great Britain
Preceded by Robert Kingsmill	Baronet (of Sidmanton); 1805–1823	Extinct
