= Edward Rushworth (politician) =

British clergyman and politician

Edward Rushworth (17 October 1755 – 15 October 1817) was a British clergyman on the Isle of Wight, and a token politician.

Rushworth was the oldest son of Royal Navy Captain John Rushworth of Portsea in Hampshire. Educated at Winchester College and at Trinity College, Oxford, he became a deacon at Yarmouth on the Isle of Wight.

In 1780 he married Catherine Holmes, daughter of Reverend Leonard Holmes (later the 1st Baron Holmes). His father-in-law was the patron of both the parliamentary boroughs on the island.

He was a Member of Parliament (MP) for the two boroughs on the Isle of Wight for several periods between 1780 and 1797. He was MP for Yarmouth from 1781 to 1781, for Newport from 1784 to 1790, for Yarmouth in 1790, and for Yarmouth again from 1796 to 1797.

He appears to have held the seats only as a placeholder, and did not take part in any parliamentary proceedings.

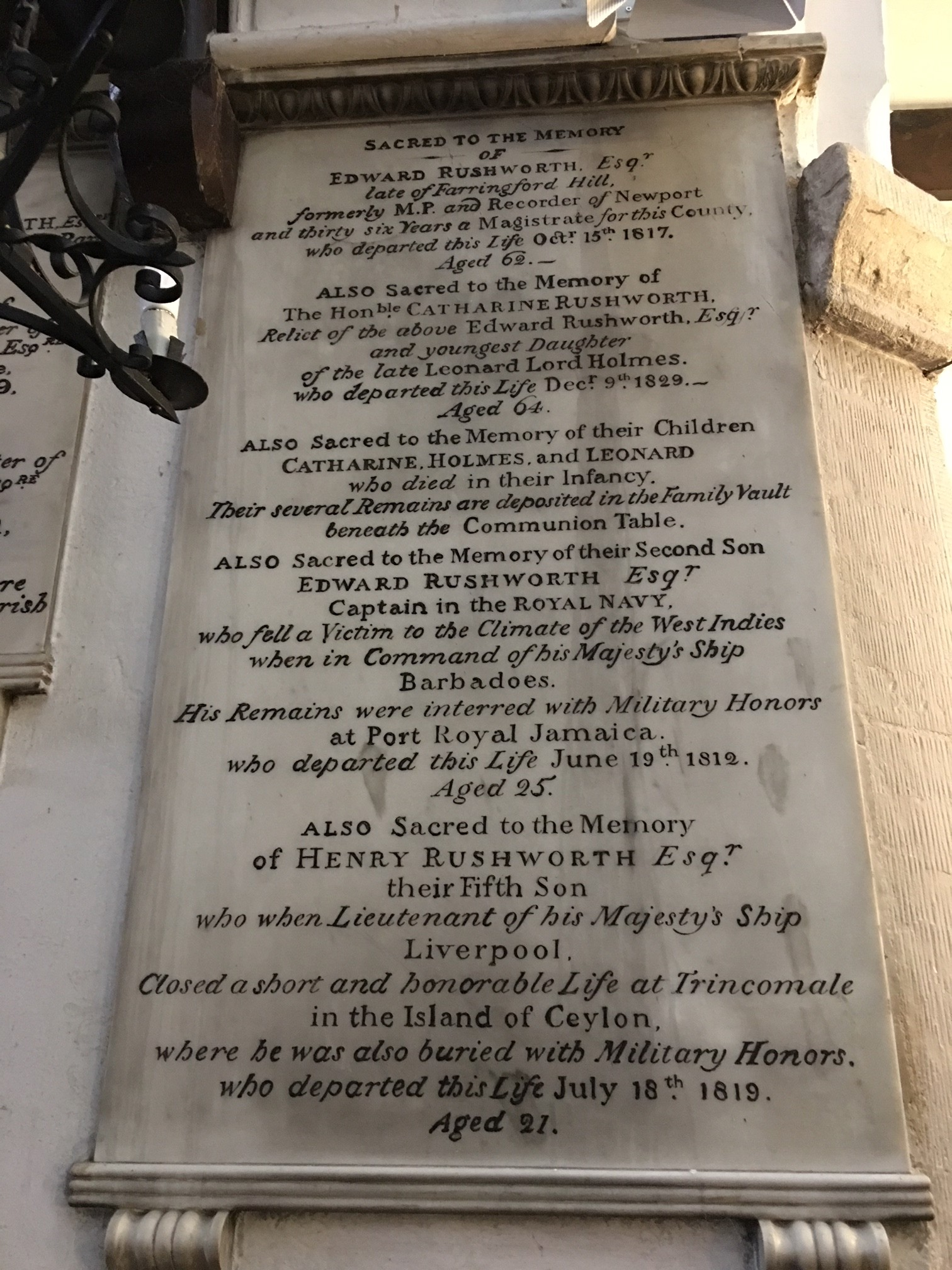
Edward Rushworth memorial in St James' Church, Yarmouth, Isle of Wight

Parliament of Great Britain
Preceded by James Worsley; Robert Kingsmill	Member of Parliament for Yarmouth, Isle of Wight; 1780–1781; With: Edward Morant	Succeeded by Edward Morant; Sir Thomas Rumbold, Bt
Preceded by Sir Richard Worsley, Bt; Hon. John St John	Member of Parliament for Newport, Isle of Wight; 1784–1790; With: Hon. Hugh Seymour-Conway 1784–1786; Hon. John Townshend 1786–1790; George Byng 1790	Succeeded by The Viscount Melbourne; The Viscount Palmerston
Preceded by Thomas Clarke Jervoise; Philip Francis	Member of Parliament for Yarmouth, Isle of Wight; 1790–1791; With: Thomas Clarke Jervoise	Succeeded by Jervoise Clarke Jervoise; Sir John Leicester, Bt
Preceded by Jervoise Clarke Jervoise; Sir John Leicester, Bt	Member of Parliament for Yarmouth, Isle of Wight; 1796–1797; With: Jervoise Clarke Jervoise	Succeeded by Jervoise Clarke Jervoise; William Peachy
