= Sir Robert Kingsmill, 1st Baronet =

Royal Navy officer and politician (1730–1805)

Admiral Sir Robert Kingsmill Bt
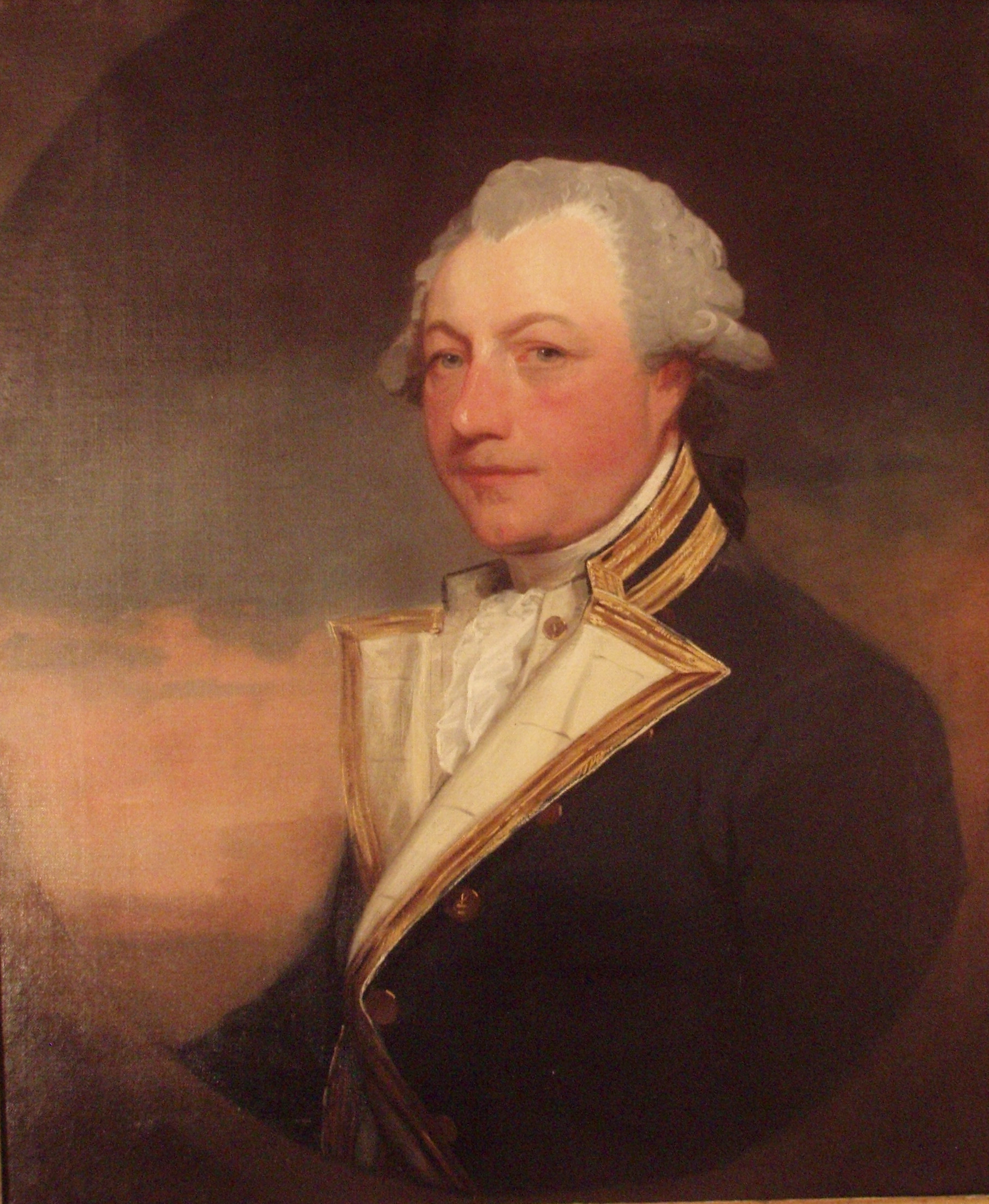
- Portrait by Gilbert Stuart
- Born: 1730; Belfast, Ireland
- Died: 23 November 1805 (aged 74–75); Sydmonton Court, Hampshire
- Military career
- Allegiance: Great Britain; United Kingdom
- Branch: Royal Navy
- Service years: 1746–1805
- Rank: Admiral of the Blue
- Commands: HMS Swallow; HMS Basilisk; HMS Crescent; HMS Vigilant; HMS Elizabeth; HMS Duke; Cork Station
- Conflicts: Seven Years' War; American Revolutionary War; French Revolutionary Wars; Napoleonic Wars

Admiral of the Blue Sir Robert Brice Kingsmill, 1st Baronet (1730 – 23 November 1805) was a Royal Navy officer and politician who served in the Seven Years' War, American War of Independence and French Revolutionary and Napoleonic Wars. Kingsmill was a contemporary and close friend of Horatio Nelson, and was one of the Royal Navy officers referred to as "The Conquerors of the Seas", illustrated in Piercy Roberts' 1800 engraving. He served with George Rodney in the West Indies, where he was wounded in battle, and with Augustus Keppel at the Battle of Ushant.

He took the time to embark on a career in politics as a Member of Parliament, giving this up several times to resume his service in the Navy when war broke out. Kingsmill rose to flag rank by the time of the outbreak of war with revolutionary France in 1793. As the naval commander-in-chief on the coast of Ireland, he repelled several attempts by the French to invade Ireland and foment insurrection. Kingsmill died on 23 November 1805 at Sydmonton Court as a baronet and with the rank of Admiral of the Blue.

== Family and early life ==
He was born in Belfast as Robert Brice, the son of Captain Charles Brice, of Castle Chichester, and his wife Jane. He followed his father into the navy, joining the 14-gun sloop HMS Speedwell as an able seaman on 29 October 1746. He remained on Speedwell for several years, being promoted to midshipman on 3 October 1748.

In August 1750, while aboard HMS Blandford off the coast of Guinea, Kingsmill daringly saved the life of 19-year-old Isaac Heard (future officer of arms at the College of Arms), who was swept overboard in a storm. The storm ripped off the mast with Heard on it, and he was spotted in the water caught up in the mast before being rescued by Kingsmill. Heard, later Sir Isaac Heard, and Kingsmill enjoyed a close friendship for the rest of their lives. Kingsmill passed his lieutenant's examination on 5 July 1754 and received his commission on 29 April 1756. The outbreak of the Seven Years' War offered further opportunities for advancement, and in February 1761 he was promoted to master and commander of the sloop HMS Swallow. His capture of the 10-gun French privateer Sultan led to the confirmation of his rank on 3 July, and he soon received an appointment to the bomb vessel HMS Basilisk. It was during this period that he was recalled and placed in command of one of the yachts preparing to carry Princess Charlotte of Mecklenburg-Strelitz and her suite to England to marry King George III. The voyage was hampered by fierce storms, but all of the yachts and their naval escorts arrived safely. He then returned to the Basilisk and sailed to the West Indies with Rear-Admiral George Rodney's fleet. Brice assisted with the assaults on Martinique and St Lucia, during which he was wounded.

Brice's Name Act 1766
- Act of Parliament
- Parliament of Great Britain
- Long title: An Act for enabling Robert Brice Esquire and his Heirs to take and use the Name, and bear the Arms, of Kingesmill.
- Citation: 6 Geo. 3. c. 36 Pr.
- Territorial extent: Great Britain

Dates
- Royal assent: 11 April 1766
- Commencement: 17 December 1765 (Note: Start of session.)

Status: Current legislation

Brice's rewards for his good services were a promotion to post-captain on 26 May 1762, and an appointment to command the 28-gun sixth rate HMS Crescent. He was sent back to the West Indies and remained there until the end of the Seven Years' War in 1764, upon which he returned to England. He married Elizabeth Corry, heiress to the Kingsmill estates at Sydmonton Court in Hampshire, at some point in 1766. Her uncle had died on 8 January 1766, and after changing his surname and arms to Kingsmill, by a private act of Parliament, Brice's Name Act 1766 (6 Geo. 3. c. 36 Pr.), he succeeded to the estates. He retired from active naval service and spent the years of peace enjoying his newly acquired wealth and status.

== Active service and political career ==
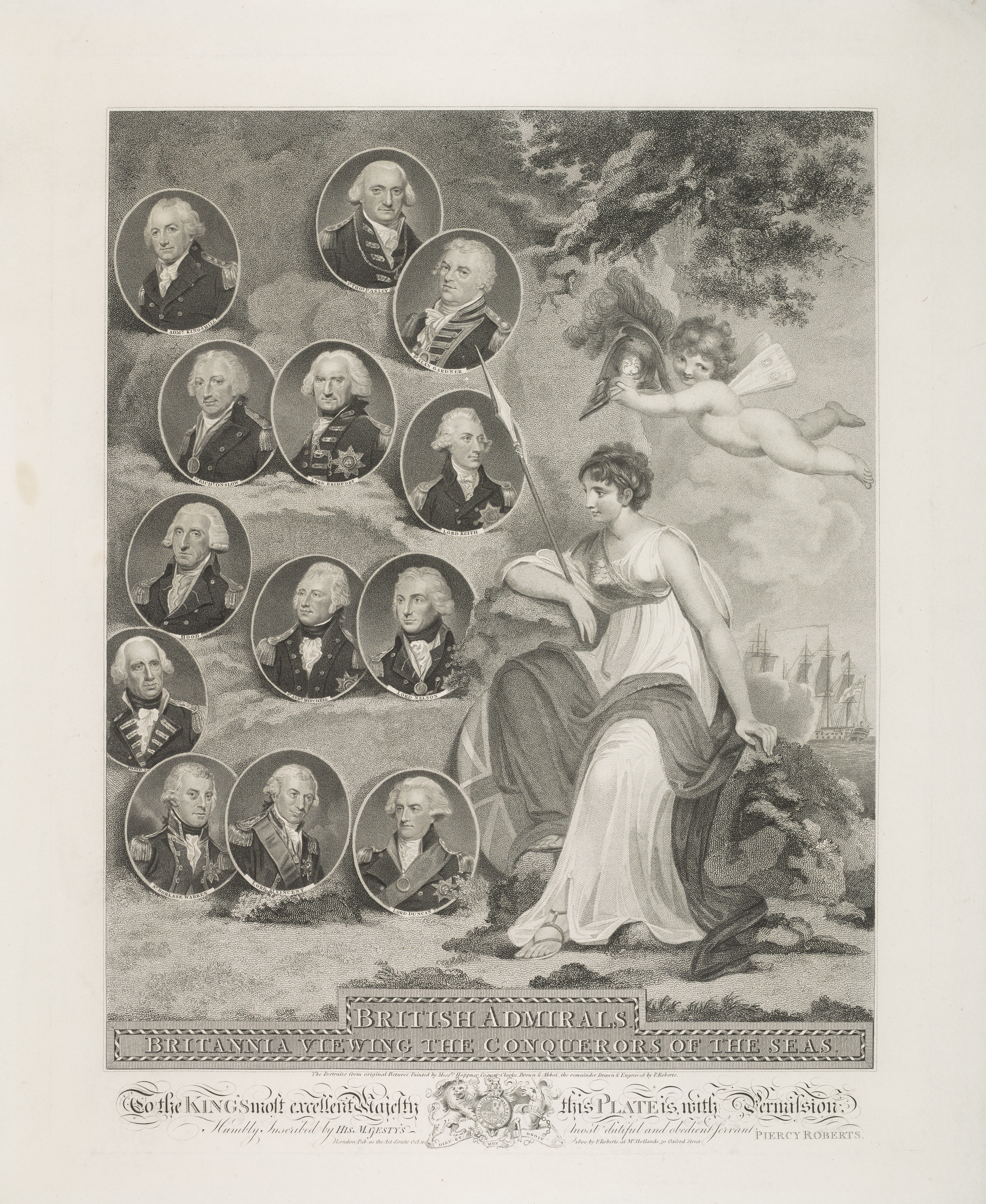
British Admirals - Brittania Viewing the Conquerors of the Seas - Roberts, 1800 - Admiral Kingsmill shown top left

The outbreak of war with France in 1778 during the American War of Independence led to his return to active service. He accepted command of the 64-gun HMS Vigilant and formed part of Admiral Augustus Keppel's fleet at the Battle of Ushant on 27 July 1778. The indecisive result and subsequent controversies and intrigues surrounding the conduct of the officers involved redounded against Kingsmill. He was offered service in the West Indies, but turned it down by resigning his command.

Kingsmill took advantage of this break from active service to enter politics. He was elected as Member of Parliament for Yarmouth, on the Isle of Wight, but only held the seat for a year. His dabbling in politics brought him more enemies in high positions, and Kingsmill was destined to remain without a ship until April 1782, when he took over the newly refitted 74-gun third rate HMS Elizabeth. Kingsmill was too late to join Admiral Lord Howe's expedition to relieve Gibraltar, and was instead offered command of a reinforcement squadron that was being prepared to sail to the East Indies. He accepted the appointment, which would see him command a squadron consisting of Elizabeth, the 74-gun HMS Grafton, the 64-gun HMS Europa and the 32-gun HMS Iphigenia. His force was finally ready to put to sea by 17 January 1783, but while sailing through the Bay of Biscay they encountered heavy gales, and were eventually forced back to Spithead, having suffered considerable damage. Before Kingsmill could attend to repairs he learnt that the Treaty of Paris had been signed and that the war was over. There would be no reinforcement squadron for the East Indies. Elizabeth was to be retained in commission as a guard ship however, and Kingsmill accepted the three-year posting as her commander.

He took this opportunity to resume his parliamentary career, being elected to the constituency of Tregony on 5 April 1784, holding the seat until 1790. He does not appear to have ever spoken in parliament, but records show that he voted in favour of William Pitt over his 1785 Reform Bill, against him during the Regency crises of 1788 and 1789, and against the Duke of Richmond's fortification plans in 1786. The Nootka Crisis in 1790 brought an end to his career in politics, as Kingsmill returned to active duty in command of the 90-gun HMS Duke. The crisis passed without breaking into open war, and Kingsmill paid off Duke and once again entered semi-retirement. In October 1790, he was selected to serve as a member of the panel of officers at the court-martial concerning the mutiny and loss of HMS Bounty. As contemporaries in the service, Sir Robert and Horatio Nelson developed a close friendship that lasted until Nelson's death at Trafalgar on 21 October 1805.

== French Revolutionary Wars ==
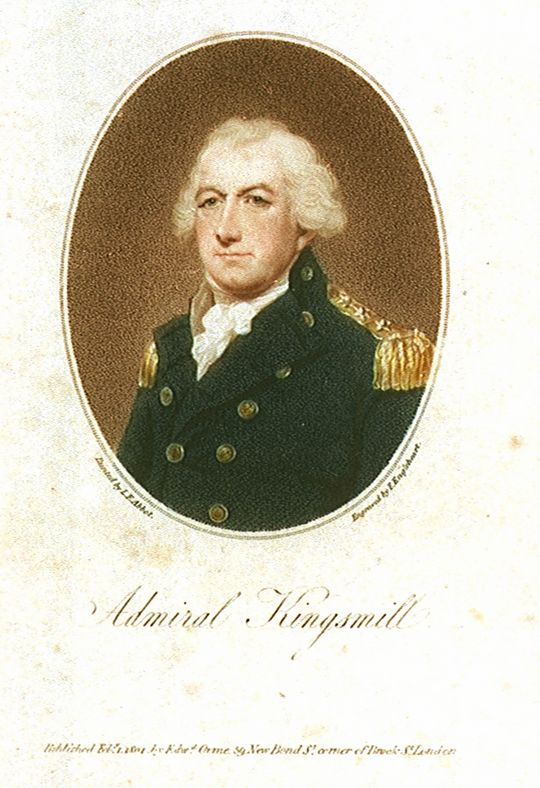
Admiral Sir Robert Kingsmill

The outbreak of war with revolutionary France led to a general promotion of Royal Navy officers on 1 February 1793. Kingsmill was advanced to Rear-Admiral of the White and placed in command of the Irish station, despite having comparatively little experience of command. The forces at his disposal consisted of two ships of the line, seven frigates and four smaller vessels, which he quickly put to use combating the swarms of enemy cruisers that operated in these waters. He was advanced to Vice-Admiral of the White on 4 July 1794, and continued to grow rich off the spoils of captured privateers and French supply ships. He was still on station in Cork in 1796 and played a role in the defeat of the French Expédition d'Irlande that year. The main French force under Admiral Morard de Galles sailed from Brest, evading the blockading fleet under Admiral Sir John Colpoys and headed for Ireland to land troops to support an anticipated rising of the United Irishmen. Kingsmill knew his forces were too few to risk an open engagement, but shadowed the French fleet, which were eventually dispersed by gales, and was able to harry their retreat back to France. The risk to Ireland and the importance of Kingsmill's squadron demonstrated, the Admiralty hurried to increase his supplies and resources. He was ready for the French when they made another attempt in May 1798, but the crushing of the main force by Sir John Borlase Warren at the Battle of Tory Island put a decisive end to the threat.

Kingsmill continued to run the station, being promoted to Admiral of the Blue on 14 February 1799. He had asked the First Lord of the Admiralty, Earl Spencer as early as February 1798 for permission to retire, and this request was finally granted towards the end of 1800. This was granted, and he duly stepped down, being succeeded by Sir Alan Gardner. Kingsmill was rewarded on 24 November 1800 with a baronetcy as a gesture of appreciation from King George III for his long years of service. He spent his last years in retirement, dying at Sydmonton Court, Kingsclere, Hampshire on 23 November 1805 at the age of 75. By then he had served the Navy for nearly 60 years, in a career that spanned four major wars. He died without issue, the baronetcy passing to his nephew, Robert Kingsmill.

== Bibliography ==
- Tracy, Nicholas (2006). Who's who in Nelson's Navy: 200 Naval Heroes. London: Chatham Publishing. ISBN 1-86176-244-5.
- Campbell, John (1818). Naval history of Great Britain: including the history and lives of the British admirals. Vol. 7. London: Baldwyn and Co.
- Ryan, Richard (1822). Biographia Hibernica: a biographical dictionary of the worthies of Ireland, from the earliest period to the present time. Vol. 2. Sherwood, Neely & Jones.
- Laughton, J. K. (1892). "Kingsmill, Sir Richard (1730-1805)". Oxford Dictionary of National Biography. Vol. 31. Oxford University Press.. Revised version available online (subscription required).
- Burke, Bernard (1844). A genealogical and heraldic history of the extinct and dormant baronetcies of England, Ireland and Scotland (2 ed.). J. R. Smith.
- Barrington, Samuel (22 October 1790). "Court Martial of William Bligh et al for the Loss of the Bounty".
- Nelson, Admiral Lord Horatio (1846) [1804], The Dispatches and Letters of Vice Admiral Lord Viscount Nelson, vol. 6, London: Henry Colburn, pp. 133–134, ISBN 1-4212-4840-9
- Ralfe, James (1828), The Naval Biography of Great Britain: Consisting of Historical Memoirs of Those Officers of the British Navy who Distinguished Themselves During the Reign of His Majesty George III, vol. 1, London: Whitmore & Fenn, pp. 354–356, ISBN 1-154-06903-6

Parliament of Great Britain
Preceded by James Worsley; Jervoise Clarke Jervoise	Member of Parliament for Yarmouth, Isle of Wight; 1779–1780; With: James Worsley	Succeeded by Edward Morant; Edward Rushworth
Preceded by John Stephenson; John Dawes	Member of Parliament for Tregony; 1784–1790; With: Sir Lloyd Kenyon, Bt 1784–88; Hugh Seymour Conway 1788–90	Succeeded by John Stephenson; Matthew Montagu
Military offices
New post	Commander-in-Chief, Cork Station; 1797–1800	Succeeded by The Lord Gardner
Baronetage of Great Britain
New creation	Baronet (of Sidmanton); 1800–1805	Succeeded by Robert Kingsmill
