= Thomas Clarke Jervoise =

British politician (1764–1809)

Thomas Clarke Jervoise (1764 – 30 December 1809) was a British politician, MP for Yarmouth (Isle of Wight).

The son of Jervoise Clarke Jervoise MP, Jervoise served as High Sheriff of Hampshire 1786–87 and MP for Yarmouth 1787–90, but became a lunatic.
