= Brettenham, Norfolk =

Village in Norfolk, England

Coordinates: 52.415°N 0.845°E

Brettenham
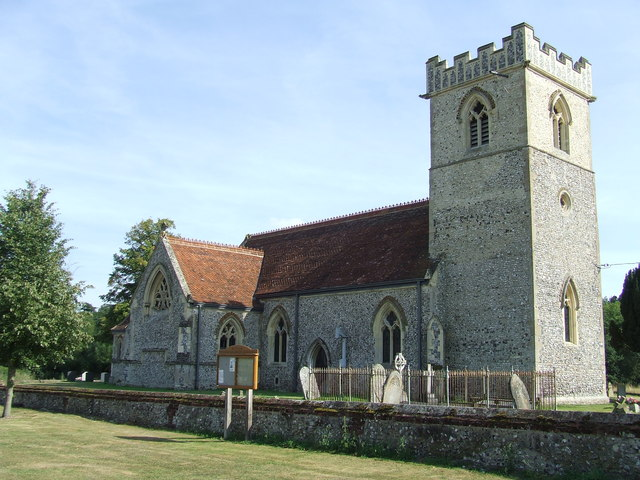
- St. Andrew's Church, Brettenham

- Location within Norfolk
- Area: 33.82 km^{2} (13.06 sq mi)
- Population: 507 (2021)
  - Density: 15/km^{2} (39/sq mi)
- OS grid reference: TL935836
- Civil parish: Brettenham
- District: Breckland
- Shire county: Norfolk
- Region: East
- Country: England
- Sovereign state: United Kingdom
- Post town: THETFORD
- Postcode district: IP24
- Dialling code: 01842
- Police: Norfolk
- Fire: Norfolk
- Ambulance: East of England
- UK Parliament: South West Norfolk

Brettenham is a village and civil parish in the English county of Norfolk. It is 4.1 miles (6.6 km) east of Thetford and 24 miles (39 km) south-west of Norwich.

== History ==
Brettenham's name is of Anglo-Saxon origin. In the Domesday Book, it is recorded as a settlement of 40 households in the hundred of Shropham and formed part of the estates of Roger Bigod, St. Etheldreda's Abbey in Ely, Eudo Dapifer and John, nephew of Walderan.

Parts of Snarehill Airfield are within the parish. This was a training base used by the Royal Flying Corps during the First World War which was converted to a decoy site during the Second World War. Some concrete structures associated with the base remain.

== Geography ==
According to the 2021 census, Brettenham has a population of 507, which shows a slight decrease from the 555 people recorded in the 2011 census. The course of the River Thet runs through the parish.

== St. Andrew's Church ==
St. Andrew's Church is Norman in origin. It suffered extensive damage in a fire in 1693 which destroyed the parsonage. The church was significantly remodelled during the 1850s by Samuel Sanders Teulon at great expense and with stained-glass installed by A. L. Moore.

In the tower hang five bells, the earliest complete ring by John Taylor & Co in the country. They were cast in 1852 as a gift by Isabella Buxton who "contributed a peal of five finely toned bells, cast by Messrs Taylors of Loughborough", according to the Norfolk Chronicle, as part of renovations to the tower. The bell frame and fittings have been damaged due to a leak in the tower roof, so ringing ceased in 1930. Minor repairs were made in 1991, however one of the foundation beams was determined to be weaker than originally thought, and ringing remains not possible.

== Governance ==
Brettenham is part of the electoral ward of Forest for local elections and is part of the district of Breckland. It is part of the South West Norfolk parliamentary constituency.
