= Buxton baronets =

Set index for Buxton baronets

There have been two baronetcies created for persons with the surname Buxton, one in the Baronetage of Great Britain and one in the Baronetage of the United Kingdom. One creation is extant.

- Buxton baronets of Shadwell Lodge (1800)
- Buxton baronets of Belfield (1840)
