= Jervoise Clarke Jervoise (Yarmouth MP) =

English Whig Member of Parliament

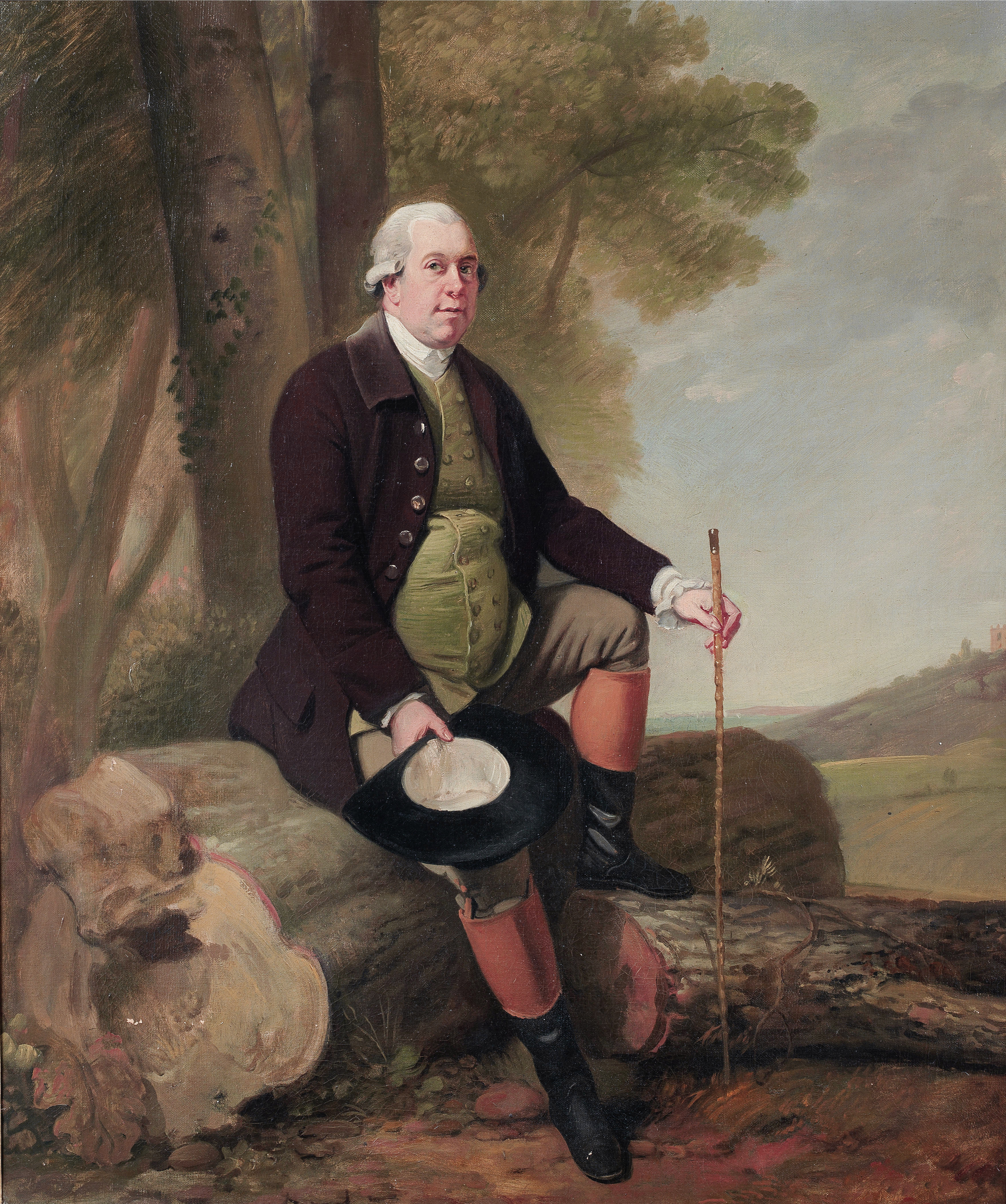
Jervoise Clarke-Jervoise (Francis Wheatley, circa 1775–9)

Jervoise Clarke Jervoise (born Clarke; 27 April 1734 – 5 January 1808) was an English Whig Member of Parliament (MP) who sat in the House of Commons of Great Britain and subsequently the House of Commons of the United Kingdom for most of the years from 1768 to 1808.

Jervoise Clarke was the son of Samuel Clarke of Bloomsbury, London, and his wife, Mary Elizabeth. He was entered Emmanuel College, Cambridge in 1751.

At the 1768 general election he was returned as a member of parliament (MP) for Yarmouth, Isle of Wight, but was unseated on petition the following year. He was returned for Yarmouth at the 1774 general election, and in 1777 he took the additional surname Jervoise. He held the Yarmouth seat until he resigned in 1779 to stand at a by-election in Hampshire. He won the seat, and was re-elected in 1784, but was defeated at the 1790 general election.

He was returned to the Commons the following year at a by-election for Yarmouth, and held the seat until his death in 1808.

Parliament of Great Britain
Preceded by Thomas Holmes; Jeremiah Dyson	Member of Parliament for Yarmouth; 1768 – 1769; With: William Strode	Succeeded by Thomas Dummer; George Lane Parker
Preceded by Thomas Dummer; George Lane Parker	Member of Parliament for Yarmouth; 1774 – 1779; With: Edward Meux Worsley 1774–75; James Worsley from 1775	Succeeded by Robert Kingsmill; James Worsley
Preceded by Sir Simeon Stuart, Bt; Sir Henry St John, Bt	Member of Parliament for Hampshire; 1779 – 1790; With: Sir Henry St John, Bt to 1780; Robert Thistlethwayte from 1780	Succeeded by Sir William Heathcote, Bt; William John Chute
Preceded by Thomas Clarke Jervoise; Edward Rushworth	Member of Parliament for Yarmouth; 1791 – 1800; With: Sir John Leicester, Bt 179–197; Edward Rushworth 1796–97; William Peachy from 1797	Succeeded by Parliament of the United Kingdom
Parliament of the United Kingdom
Preceded by Parliament of Great Britain	Member of Parliament for Yarmouth; 1801 – 1808; With: William Peachy to 1802; James Patrick Murray 1802–03; Charles Macdonnell 1803; Henry Swann 1803–04; John Delgarno 1804; Home Riggs Popham 1804–06; David Scott 1806; Thomas William Plummer 1806–07; William Orde-Powlett 1807; Sir John Orde, Bt from 1807	Succeeded by Benjamin Griffinhoofe; Sir John Orde, Bt
