= John Dawes (MP) =

British politician (died 1822)

Member of Parliament for Tregony
- In office 1780–1784

Member of Parliament for Hastings
- In office 1784–1790

Personal details
- Born: 1700s
- Died: 23 March 1822

John Dawes was a British politician who was a member of parliament.

== See also ==
- List of MPs elected in the 1780 British general election
- List of MPs elected in the 1784 British general election
