= Lloyd Kenyon =

Lloyd Kenyon may refer to:

- Lloyd Kenyon, 1st Baron Kenyon (1732 – 1802), Lord Chief Justice, King's Bench
- Lloyd Kenyon, 3rd Baron Kenyon (1805 - 1869), British peer and Member of Parliament
