= Fanny Bulkeley-Owen =

British peer, historian and author

- Born: Fanny Mary Katherine Ormsby-Gore; 1845; Great Britain
- Died: 27 November 1927 (aged 81–82); Shrewsbury, Shropshire, England
- Occupation: Historian
- Spouse(s): Lloyd Kenyon (m. 1863; died 1865) Thomas Bulkeley-Owen (m. 1880; died 1910)
- Children: Lloyd Tyrell-Kenyon
- Relatives: John Ormsby-Gore (father); Lloyd Kenyon (father-in-law)
- Writing career
- Subject: Welsh cultural movements

The Honourable Fanny Mary Katherine Bulkeley-Owen (1845 – 25 November 1927; née Ormsby-Gore, married name Kenyon from 1863, then Bulkeley-Owen from 1880) was a British historian and author. She was a member of the Anglo-Irish Gore family.

== Biography ==
Ormsby-Gore was the only daughter of John Ormsby-Gore, 1st Baron Harlech. She married first, in 1863, Hon. Lloyd Kenyon (1835–1865), son and heir of the 3rd Baron Kenyon. He died before his father, and their only child, also named Lloyd Kenyon, succeeded his grandfather as 4th Baron Kenyon in 1869. She re-married, in 1880, Rev. Thomas Bulkeley-Owen, who died in 1910.

She displayed a keen interest in researching Welsh cultural movements, and wrote a memorandum on the history of Maelor Saesneg for the Welsh Land Commission in 1894. She was awarded the bardic title of Gwenrhian Gwynedd.

In 1897, Bulkeley-Owen published a history of the parish of Selattyn, which includes the family estate of Brogyntyn. She died in Shrewsbury in 1927.

The National Library of Wales is in possession of a letter written by Lord Harlech to her, dated 9 December 1906.
