= Sprange v Barnard =

1789 English trusts law case

- Court: Court of Chancery
- Citation: (1789) 2 Bro CC 585

Keywords
- Trusts, gift

Sprange v Barnard (1789) 2 Bro CC 585 is an English trusts law case, concerning the certainty of subject matter to create a trust. It is an example of a court concluding that the words of a testament being interpreted to mean, in essence, that a gift was intended rather than a trust.

== Facts ==
The testatrix left £300 worth of annuities to her husband 'for his sole use; and at his death, the remaining part of what is left, that he does not want for his own wants and use to be divided between' a number of beneficiaries.

== Judgment ==
Sir Richard Arden, Master of the Rolls, held that no trust arose, and the husband took all the property beneficially. Making a gift was the dominant intention, not to bind the husband with a trust.

== See also ==
- English trust law
