= John Lee (Attorney-General) =

English lawyer, politician, and law officer of the Crown

John Lee, Esq.
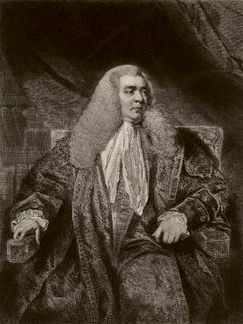
- Mezzotint Portrait by Samuel William Reynolds, 1838 (reprod. of Painting by Sir Joshua Reynolds, 1786)
- Born: 6 March 1733
- Died: 5 August 1793 (aged 60)

John Lee, KC (6 March 1733 – 5 August 1793), was an English lawyer, politician, and law officer of the Crown. He assisted in the early days of Unitarianism in England.

== Early life ==
Born in Leeds, Yorkshire, on 6 March 1733, he was one of eight sons and ten children of cloth merchant Thomas Lee and his wife, Mary (née Reveley). After his father died in 1736 he was mainly brought up by his mother, a Dissenter and friend of Thomas Secker, later Archbishop of Canterbury, who died in 1750.

== Legal career ==
Lee was called to the bar at Lincoln's Inn and joined the Northern Circuit, where eventually he gained an equal share with James Wallace of the leadership. He was a king's attorney and serjeant for the County Palatine of Lancaster from 1782 until his death.

In April 1769 Lee appeared before the House of Commons with John Glynn as counsel for John Wilkes and the petitioners against the return of Colonel Henry Luttrell for Middlesex; the petition failed. The government offered him a seat in the house and the K.C. in 1769, and in 1770 K.C. with the appointment of solicitor-general to the queen, but he refused both offers on political grounds. On 18 September 1769 he became, however, recorder of Doncaster. The appointment was through the influence of Lord Rockingham, whom Lee knew through the law, and signalled Lee's arrival as legal adviser to the Rockingham Whigs. In the Wilkite agitation of that year around the Society of Gentlemen Supporters of the Bill of Rights, Rockingham brought Lee and Alexander Wedderburn to Wentworth, to steer a moderate course, and in mid-September they found a precedent from 1701 for a petition to the Crown to dissolve parliament.

In 1779 Lee was one of the counsel for Admiral Augustus Keppel, 1st Viscount Keppel when he was tried by court-martial for his conduct in the Battle of Ushant. The trial in Portsmouth was politicised, Keppel being a Whig, and his second-in-command, Sir Hugh Palliser, a Tory, acting for the prosecution. When Keppel's name was cleared, Lee took no fee, but Keppel gave him his own portrait, painted by Sir Joshua Reynolds. In 1780 Lee became a king's counsel. Known at the bar as "honest Jack Lee", he was distinguished for his integrity, and amassed a large fortune.

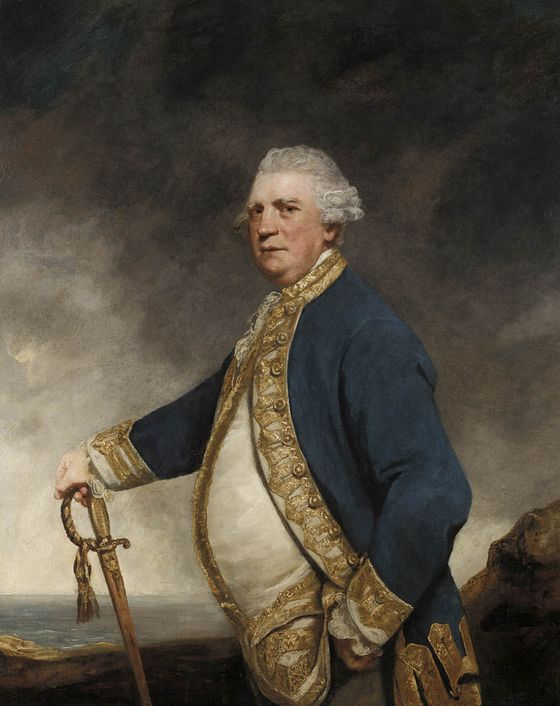
Portrait of Augustus Keppel by Reynolds, given to Lee by Keppel

== In politics ==
In the second administration of Lord Rockingham, Lee was appointed Solicitor General for England and Wales, and sat in parliament for Clitheroe. It was a pocket borough, controlled by Thomas Lister and the Curzon family. Lister was a Whig, Assheton Curzon a Tory ministerialist, and when the two came to an agreement in 1790 to share the double-member seat, Lee lost out. It meant he had no seat in the 1790 British general election. Later that year, he was brought in for Higham Ferrers by the Whig magnate William Fitzwilliam, 4th Earl Fitzwilliam at a by-election, Viscount Duncannon preferring Knaresborough. He then sat for that constituency till he died.

Lee resigned office on Rockingham's death, but returned to it under the Duke of Portland, and on the death of Wallace at the end of 1783, he was promoted to be Attorney General for England and Wales, and held the office till the Duke of Portland was dismissed. In politics he was a thoroughgoing party man. One of his maxims was "Never speak well of a political enemy". John Wilkes spoke of him as having been in the House of Commons "a most impudent dog"; Nathaniel Wraxall called him coarse and abusive, though he acknowledged his intelligence: "a man of strong intellectual parts, though of very coarse manners".

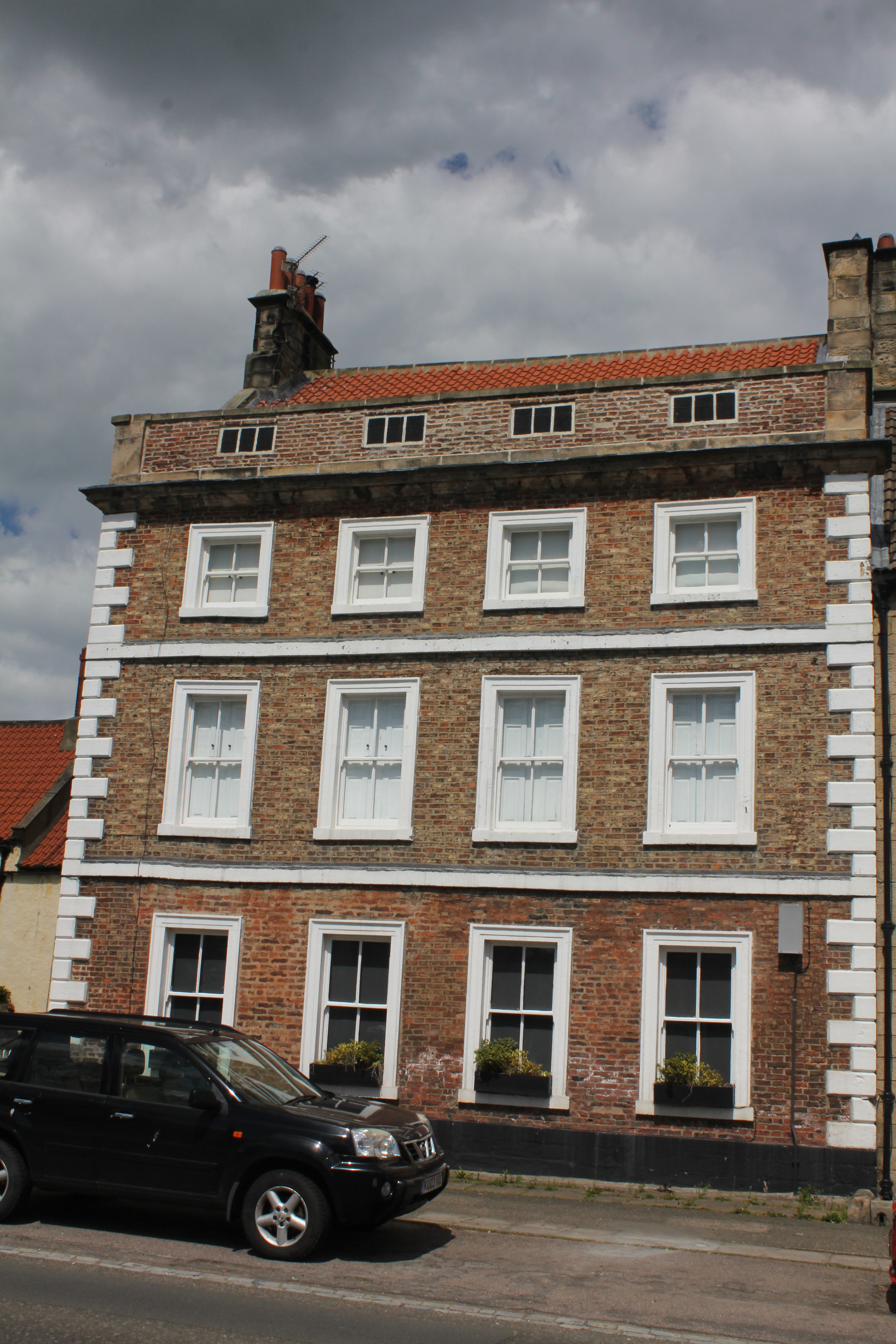
Malvern House, 7 Front Street, Staindrop, County Durham today, once owned by John Lee

== Death and family ==
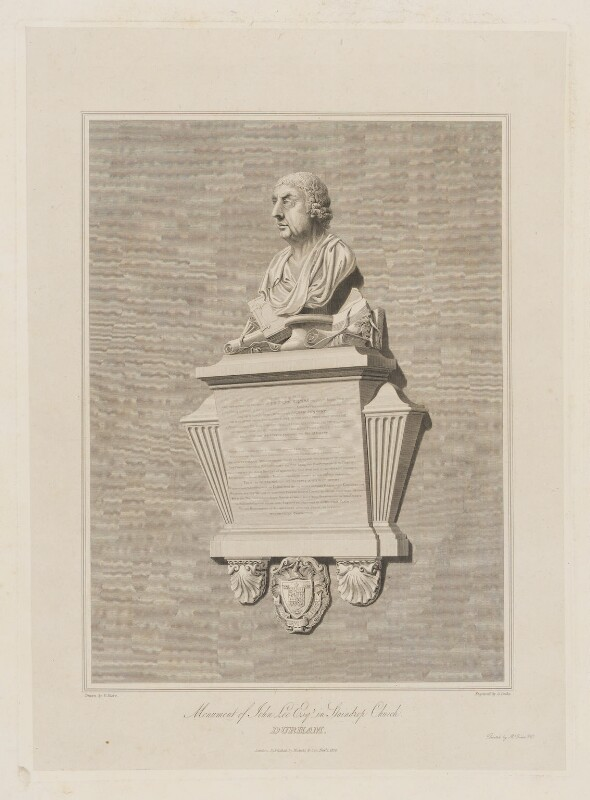
Monument to John Lee in Staindrop Church, Joseph Nollekens (1795)

Lee died from cancer on 5 August 1793, having suffered from ill health and played little part in politics at the end of his life. He was buried at Staindrop Church, County Durham. The monument there, by Joseph Nollekens, was paid for by Earl Fitzwilliam. A bust of Lee by Nollekens had already appeared in The Rockingham Mausoleum.

Lee had married in 1769 Mary Hutchinson (1734–1812), daughter of William Hutchinson of Staindrop, and obtained a house and estate there. They had a daughter, Mary Tabitha (1777–1851). His father-in-law was agent to Henry Vane, 2nd Earl of Darlington.

== Associations ==
Joseph Priestley and Richard Price were among Lee's friends, and he associated with pro-Americans and radicals.

=== "Honest Whig" and pro-American ===
Lee knew Benjamin Franklin through the Whig coffee-house club — Franklin's "club of Honest Whigs" of his first mission in London (1757–1762) — which he frequented with Priestley, Price and Andrew Kippis, and introduced Priestley to Edmund Burke. On a later Franklin visit, that of 1773–5, Lee was one of those who met in Ludgate Hill, at the London Coffee House. It was the so-called "fortnight club".

In Franklin's Privy Council hearing of 1774, over the Hutchinson letters affair, Lee acted as his counsel, as second to John Dunning. With Thomas Townshend, Lee was attacked in 1775 by John Shebbeare writing as a government hack for Lord North's administration.

=== Religious views and Essex Street Chapel ===
By family background in Leeds, Lee was associated with Mill Hill Chapel, which was de facto Unitarian. His own views were influenced by his friend Priestley. He met Theophilus Lindsey through Priestley and William Turner of Wakefield, in the late 1760s. He was a sympathetic adviser to the promoters of the Feathers Tavern petition of 1772 to Parliament, asking for lifting of restrictions on religious dissenters.

A leading figure in the petition was Theophilus Lindsey, a priest of the Church of England, who in 1773 resigned his Yorkshire living because of religious scruples of conscience, a step against Lee's wishes because the chances were his replacement would be High Church or an evangelical, rather than a liberal. In 1774 Lee helped Lindsey establish the first avowedly Unitarian congregation in England. It was Lord Shelburne, a financial backer, who directed Lee, and Sir George Saville, towards Lindsey's Unitarians. Before the 1813 Act it was illegal to deny the doctrine of the Trinity, but the temper of the times allowed for some latitude. Lee persuaded the relevant London justices to register the Essex Street Chapel at Hicks Hall, and attended Lindsey's inaugural sermon. In 1775, Lee, Lindsey and his wife and Priestley were meeting regularly on Sunday mornings.

Lee was known as a nonconformist. With Sir William Fowle Middleton, 1st Baronet, he voted in parliament in 1789 for legal relief for dissenters, when the Test Acts and Corporation Act were debated.

=== Later years ===
In 1779 Burke consulted Lee on his own affairs, and a case concerning the Irish army officer Bigoe Armstrong (died 1794). With Charles James Fox and others, Lee worked successfully for the release of John Trumbull, during the American Revolutionary War. In the small group of Rockingham Whigs involved in the Yorkshire Association petition of early 1780, with Shelburne, Burke, Keppel and George Byng, he wrote again to Christopher Wyvill in support of the Association in 1782.

John Burgoyne, on parole in England after his capture by the Continental Army, was summoned back to America in 1781 (apparently tit-for-tat, in relation to the detention in the Tower of London of Henry Laurens. The advice of Lee and Charles James Fox led to an appeal to Benjamin Franklin, carried out by Burke.

In Fytch's Case, Lee won the case, on a resignation bond given for a church living, in the Court of Common Pleas in 1782 against the Bishop of London, on behalf of Lewis Disney Fytche. The decision was reversed on appeal.

Samuel Heywood was one of Lee's friends from the Northern Circuit. In 1783, Lee represented the owners of the slave ship Zong in court, after its owners tried to force their insurers to pay them for the loss of 132 slaves murdered by the ship's crew. His legal argument invoked the concept of chattel slavery and became notorious in abolitionist circles; it cannot be taken as his personal view, and the same goes for Heywood, another dissenter on the insurers's legal team.

Parliament of Great Britain
Preceded by Thomas Lister; John Parker	Member of Parliament for Clitheroe; 1782–1790; With: Thomas Lister	Succeeded by Sir John Aubrey; Penn Curzon
Preceded by Viscount Duncannon	Member of Parliament for Higham Ferrers; 1790–1793	Succeeded by James Adair
Legal offices
Preceded by Sir James Mansfield	Solicitor General; 1782	Succeeded by Richard Pepper Arden
Preceded by Richard Pepper Arden	Solicitor General; 1783	Succeeded by Sir James Mansfield
Preceded by James Wallace	Attorney General; 1783	Succeeded by Lloyd Kenyon
