= William Arden, 2nd Baron Alvanley =

British Army officer (1789–1849)

The Right Honourable The Lord Alvanley
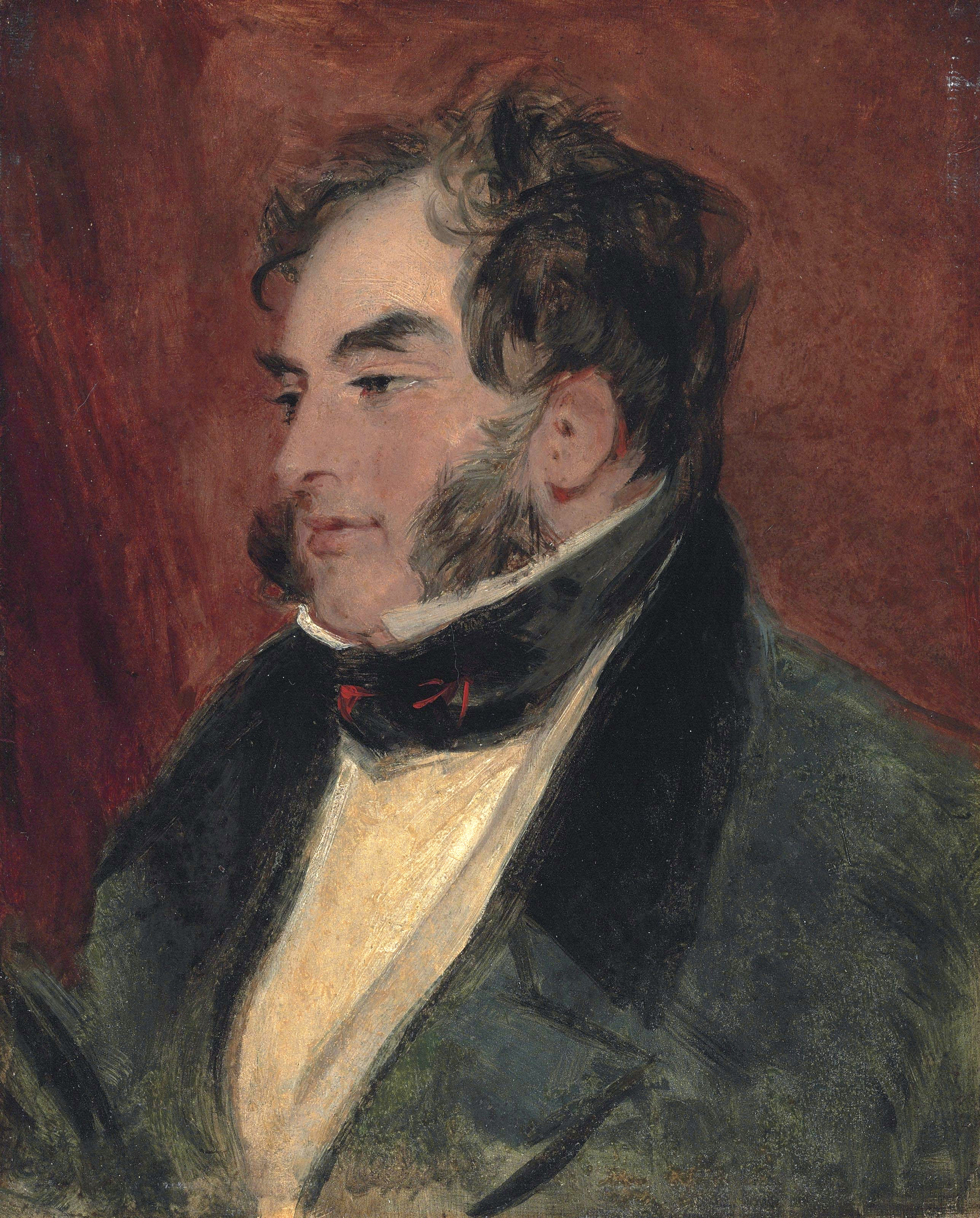
- portrait by Edwin Landseer

Personal details
- Born: 8 January 1789 London, Kingdom of Great Britain
- Died: 16 November 1849 (aged 60)
- Parents: Richard Pepper Arden, 1st Baron Alvanley (father); Anne Wilbraham-Bootle (mother)
- Relatives: Richard Arden (brother)

Military service
- Allegiance: United Kingdom
- Branch/service: British Army
- Unit: Coldstream Guards

William Arden, 2nd Baron Alvanley (8 January 1789 – 16 November 1849) was a British Army officer, peer and socialite, who was a friend of Beau Brummell and one of a close circle of young men surrounding the Prince Regent.

== Early life and military career ==
Alvanley was the son of Richard Arden, 1st Baron Alvanley and Anne Wilbraham-Bootle. Initially pursuing a career as an officer in the British Army, he purchased an ensigncy in the Coldstream Guards. He was promoted to captain in March 1809. He later transferred to the 50th (Queen's Own) Regiment of Foot, and exchanged to the half-pay of the 100th Regiment of Foot on 1 September 1812. Owing to his subsequent debts, he was forced to dispose of his half-pay on 10 June 1826. He later served in the Forest Troop, King's Regiment of Cheshire Yeomanry Cavalry, as a cornet, but resigned on 17 January 1840.

== Regency buck ==
Lord Alvanley was a prominent Regency buck and member of the Prince Regent's circle, and was friends with Beau Brummell. He was popular in society and regarded as wittiest man of his day. He, Brummell, Henry Mildmay, and Henry Pierrepoint were considered the prime movers of Watier's club, dubbed "the Dandy Club" by Lord Byron. They were also the four hosts of the July 1813 masquerade ball at which the Prince Regent greeted Alvanley and Pierrepoint, but then "cut" Brummell and Mildmay by snubbing them, staring them in the face but not speaking to them. Brummell then said to Alvanley, "Alvanley, who's your fat friend?". The Prince Regent was not amused; this incident was the final and most public sign that Brummell was no longer favored by "Prinny".

Alvanley continued to support Brummell, sending money to his friend during Brummell's exile in France. In 1835, after insulting Daniel O’Connell,Alvanley fought a duel with the son Morgan O'Connell. According to a near contemporary report, "[Alvanley] went through the business with the most perfect sang froid, but on his way to the field he whimsically intimated a singular alarm. Having descended a hollow, 'My Lord', said he to his second, 'you get me down well enough, but', alluding to his full size, 'should I fall, I do not know how the devil you will ever get me up again.'"

He had an extremely lavish lifestyle, funded by income generated by the estates that his father had bought. His prominent position in society also allowed him to float a line of credit and became widely known as a spendthrift. However, his debts became untenable and eventually his family estates had to be sold to pay them off. Underbank Hall in Stockport was sold by auction in 1823 and most of the Bredbury estate was sold in lots in 1825. In 1827 he sold the Willington Estate to Waterloo veteran William Tomkinson, land that would become the site of Willington Hall. The Arden Hall mansion was sold in 1833. He eventually resigned his membership of White's. The death of George IV in 1830 saw Alvanley's society position deteriorate, which was furthered hampered by his limited income. He occasionally contributed to debates in the House of Lords. He did not marry and had no children. On his death, the title went to his only brother, Colonel Richard Arden.

== In popular culture ==
Alvanley was portrayed by William Humphrey in the 1924 historical drama film Beau Brummel and by Maurice Kaufmann in the 1954 film of the same name.

== Arms ==
Coat of arms of William Arden, 2nd Baron Alvanley
| Crest Out of a ducal coronet Or five ostrich feathers Argent charged with a crescent Gules. Escutcheon Gules three cross-crosslets fitchée Or on a chief of the second a crescent of the first. Supporters Two talbots the dexter Argent collared Gules thereon three arrows of the first the sinister Sable thereon three arrows Gules. Motto Patientiâ Vinces |

Peerage of the United Kingdom
| Preceded by Richard Pepper Arden | Baron Alvanley; 1804–1849 | Succeeded by Richard Pepper Arden Jr. |
