= Richard Arden, 3rd Baron Alvanley =

British army officer & peer (1792-1857)

Lieutenant-Colonel The Right Honourable The Lord Alvanley
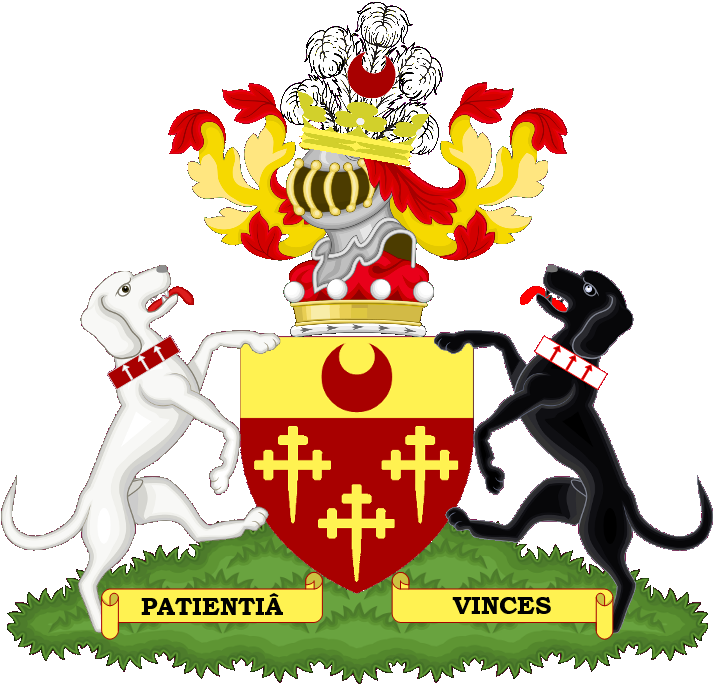

Personal details
- Born: Richard Pepper Arden; 8 December 1792
- Died: 4 June 1857 (aged 64)
- Spouse: Lady Arabella Vane (1831–1857)
- Parent(s): Richard Pepper Arden, 1st Baron Alvanley; Anne Dorothea Wilbraham-Bootle
- Relatives: William Arden (brother)

Military service
- Allegiance: United Kingdom
- Branch/service: British Army
- Years of service: 1811–1829
- Rank: Lieutenant-Colonel
- Battles/wars: Napoleonic Wars; Battle of Morales; Battle of Vittoria; Battle of Orthez; Battle of Toulouse

Lieutenant-Colonel Richard Pepper Arden, 3rd Baron Alvanley (8 December 1792 – 24 June 1857) was a British Army officer and peer.

== Early life ==
He was the son of Richard Pepper Arden, 1st Baron Alvanley and Anne Dorothea (née Wilbraham-Bootle). As a young man, he was one of a circle of friends surrounding William Wilberforce.

== Career ==
On 19 March 1811, he purchased a cornetcy in the 15th Hussars. Promoted lieutenant on 3 October 1811, he served with the regiment in the Peninsular War from February 1813 to April 1814. Arden fought at the battles of Morales, Vittoria, Orthez and Toulouse and received the service medal for the latter three.

Arden was gazetted a captain in the 2nd Garrison Battalion on 26 April 1815, being unable to afford a captaincy in a cavalry regiment. Placed on half-pay, he later exchanged into the 32nd Regiment of Foot on 8 July 1819. He purchased a commission as major in the 84th Regiment of Foot on 4 October 1822, and an unattached lieutenant-colonelcy on 30 October 1823. On 1 June 1829, he exchanged from half-pay into the Coldstream Guards as a captain and lieutenant-colonel. However, he sold out and retired from the army on 4 June 1829.

== Personal life ==
On 24 April 1831, he married Lady Arabella Vane (1801–1864), youngest daughter of the 1st Duke of Cleveland. On 16 November 1849 he succeeded to the title of Lord Alvanley on the death of his unmarried brother William Arden, 2nd Baron Alvanley.

Lord Alvanley died on 24 June 1857. With no son to inherit the title, the Barony of Alvanley became extinct when he died.

== Coat of arms ==
Coat of arms of Richard Arden, 3rd Baron Alvanley

Crest
Out of a ducal coronet Or five ostrich feathers Argent charged with a crescent Gules.
Escutcheon
Gules three cross-crosslets fitchée Or on a chief of the second a crescent of the first.
Supporters
Two talbots the dexter Argent collared Gules thereon three arrows of the first the sinister Sable thereon three arrows Gules.
Motto
Patientiâ Vinces

Peerage of the United Kingdom
Preceded by William Arden	Baron Alvanley; 1849–1857	Extinct
