= Lloyd Tyrell-Kenyon, 5th Baron Kenyon =

British peer

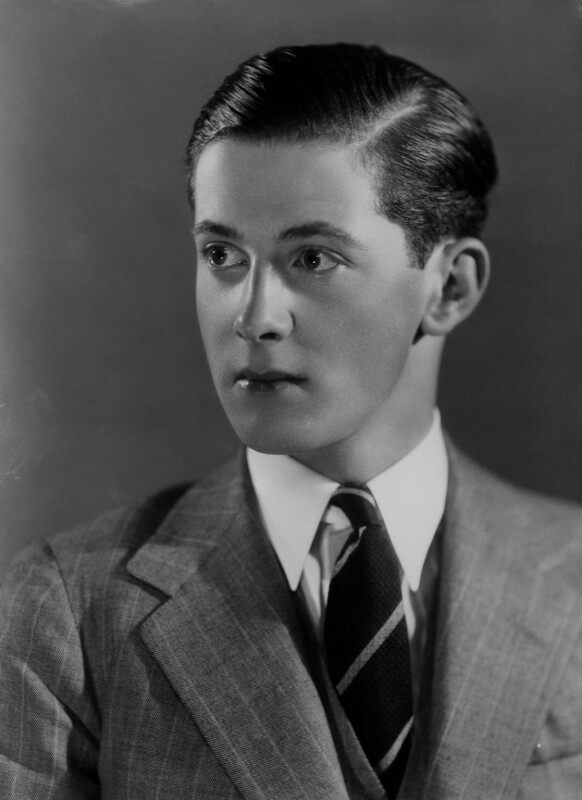
Kenyon in 1938

Lloyd Tyrell-Kenyon, 5th Baron Kenyon, CBE, DL (13 September 1917 – 16 May 1993), was a British hereditary peer, member of the House of Lords, and academic administrator. The only son of Lloyd Tyrell-Kenyon, 4th Baron Kenyon, he succeeded to the title of Baron Kenyon on his father's death in 1927.

== Life ==
Lord Kenyon was educated at Eton and then Magdalene College, Cambridge. As a peer he was active across many fields of public life including education, museums and health.

Lord Kenyon was president of the University College of North Wales in Bangor (part of the University of Wales), from 1947 to 1982. Through the university he was behind the revival of the Gwasg Gregynog Press, which printed traditional hand-bound books from metal type and woodcut illustrations, and he was chairman of the press from 1978 to 1991.

He was president of the National Museum of Wales from 1952 to 1957, trustee of the National Portrait Gallery from 1953 to 1988 and member of the Royal Commission on Historical Manuscripts from 1966 to 1993. He was credited with growing the NPG from a small specialist museum to "one of the great national galleries".

He was chairman of the Wrexham, Powys and Mawddach Hospital Management Committee from 1960 to 1974, and then chairman of the Clwyd Area Health Authority, 1974–1978. As Flintshire county councillor he was appointed to their first records committee and was an active supporter of Flintshire Record Office (later Clwyd Record Office). He was also elected to the North Wales Police Authority.

He was a director of Lloyds Bank.

He was a Justice of the Peace in 1944. He was made a Deputy Lieutenant for Flintshire in 1948, an Officer of the Most Venerable Order of the Hospital of St. John of Jerusalem, and a Commander of the Order of the British Empire in 1972. He was a provincial grandmaster for the Freemasons of North Wales. He married Leila Cookson in 1946 and had three children - two sons, one of whom pre-deceased him and one daughter. He died in Gredington, Flintshire, on 16 May 1993, aged 75.

Coat of arms of Lloyd Tyrell-Kenyon, 5th Baron Kenyon
Crest A lion sejant Proper resting the dexter forepaw on a cross flory Argent. Escutcheon Sable a chevron engrailed Or between three crosses flory Argent. Supporters Two female figures the dexter representing Truth vested in white her head irradiated on her breast a sun and in her right hand a mirror all Proper; the sinister representing Fortitude clad in a corset of mail robe Or mantle Gules on her head a casque plumed Gules in her right hand a branch of oak and her left arm resting on a pillar Proper.

Peerage of Great Britain
Preceded by Lloyd Tyrell-Kenyon	Baron Kenyon; 1927–1993	Succeeded by Lloyd Tyrell-Kenyon
