= Baron Kenyon =

Barony in the Peerage of Great Britain

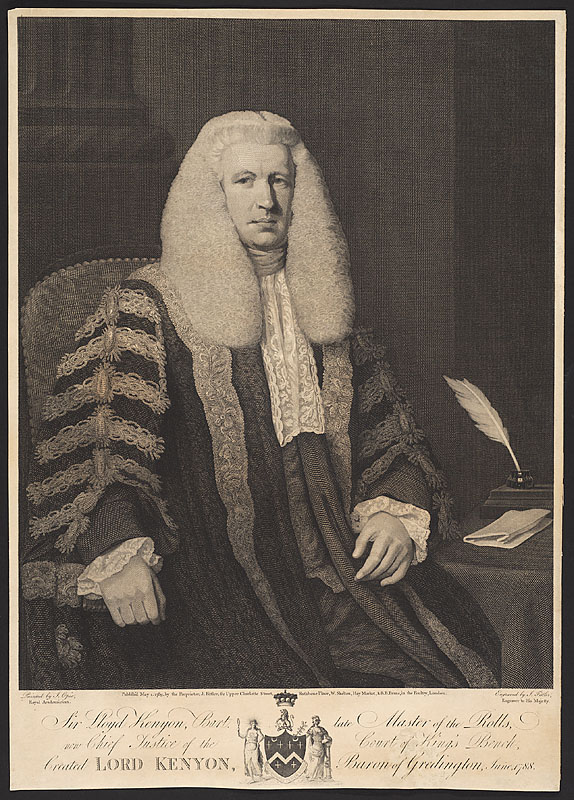
Lloyd Kenyon, 1st Baron Kenyon

Baron Kenyon, of Gredington, in the County of Flint, is a title in the Peerage of Great Britain. It was created in 1788 for the lawyer and judge Sir Lloyd Kenyon, 1st Baronet. He served as Master of the Rolls and as Lord Chief Justice of England and Wales. Kenyon had already been created a Baronet, of Gredington in the County of Flint, in 1784. His grandson, the third Baron, briefly represented St Michael's in the House of Commons. His grandson, the fourth Baron, held minor office in the governments of Lord Salisbury, Arthur Balfour and David Lloyd George and also served as Lord Lieutenant of Denbighshire. In 1912 Lord Kenyon assumed by Royal licence the additional surname of Tyrell. As of 2023 the titles are held by his great-grandson, the eighth Baron, who succeeded his brother in that year.

== Barons Kenyon (1788) ==
- Lloyd Kenyon, 1st Baron Kenyon (1732–1802)
- George Kenyon, 2nd Baron Kenyon (1776–1855). Kenyon College was named after him.
- Lloyd Kenyon, 3rd Baron Kenyon (1805–1869)
- Lloyd Tyrell-Kenyon, 4th Baron Kenyon (1864–1927)
- Lloyd Tyrell-Kenyon, 5th Baron Kenyon (1917–1993)
- Lloyd Tyrell-Kenyon, 6th Baron Kenyon (1947–2019)
- Lloyd Nicholas Tyrell-Kenyon, 7th Baron Kenyon (1972–2023)
- Alexander Simon Tyrell-Kenyon, 8th Baron Kenyon (born 1975)

The heir presumptive is the present peer's third cousin once removed, Roger Lloyd Kenyon (born 1960)

Line of succession
- Lloyd Kenyon, 1st Baron Kenyon (1732–1802)
  - George Kenyon, 2nd Baron Kenyon (1776–1855)
    - Lloyd Kenyon, 3rd Baron Kenyon (1805–1869)
      - Hon. Lloyd Kenyon (1835–1865)
        - Lloyd Tyrell-Kenyon, 4th Baron Kenyon (1864–1927)
          - Lloyd Tyrell-Kenyon, 5th Baron Kenyon (1917–1993)
            - Lloyd Tyrell-Kenyon, 6th Baron Kenyon (1947–2019)
              - Lloyd Tyrell-Kenyon, 7th Baron Kenyon (1972–2023)
              - Alexander Tyrell-Kenyon, 8th Baron Kenyon (b. 1975)
      - Hon. William Trevor Kenyon (1847–1930)
        - Gordon Lloyd Trevor Kenyon (1873–1951)
          - Lloyd Gordon Trevor Kenyon (1911–1994)
            - (1). Roger Lloyd Kenyon (b. 1960)
  - Hon. Thomas Kenyon (1780–1851)
    - John Robert Kenyon (1807–1883)
      - Edward Ranulph Kenyon (1854–1937)
        - Herbert Edward Kenyon (1881–1958)
          - John Frederick Kenyon (1921–2006)
            - (2). Richard Howard Trevor Kenyon (b. 1951)
      - Eustace Alban Kenyon (1859–1920)
        - William Patrick Kenyon (1898–1992)
          - (3). Thomas David Kenyon (b. 1932)
        - Rowland Lloyd Kenyon (1901–1959)
          - (4). Peter Rowland Kenyon (b. 1937)
            - (5). Rupert Peter Kenyon (b. 1968)
          - (6). Robert Nicholas Andrew Kenyon (b. 1939)
    - William Kenyon-Slaney (1815–1884)
      - William Kenyon-Slaney (1847–1908)
        - Robert Orlando Rodolph Kenyon-Slaney (1892–1965)
          - Robert Ivan Kenyon-Slaney (1926–1984)
            - (7). Rupert David Kenyon-Slaney (b. 1965)
              - (8). Robert Duncan Thomas Kenyon-Slaney (b. 2013)
              - (9). Orlando William Percy Kenyon-Slaney (b. 2013)
              - (10). Caspian John Aglionby Kenyon-Slaney (b. 2015)
            - (11). Thomas Alexander Kenyon-Slaney (b. 1966)

Coat of arms of Baron Kenyon
Crest A lion sejant Proper resting the dexter forepaw on a cross flory Argent. Escutcheon Sable a chevron engrailed Or between three crosses flory Argent. Supporters Two female figures the dexter representing Truth vested in white her head irradiated on her breast a sun and in her right hand a mirror all Proper; the sinister representing Fortitude clad in a corset of mail robe Or mantle Gules on her head a casque plumed Gules in her right hand a branch of oak and her left arm resting on a pillar Proper.

Baronetage of Great Britain
Preceded by Beevor baronets	Kenyon baronets of Gredington; 28 July 1784	Succeeded by Sinclair baronets
