= Baron Alvanley =

Title in the Peerage of the United Kingdom

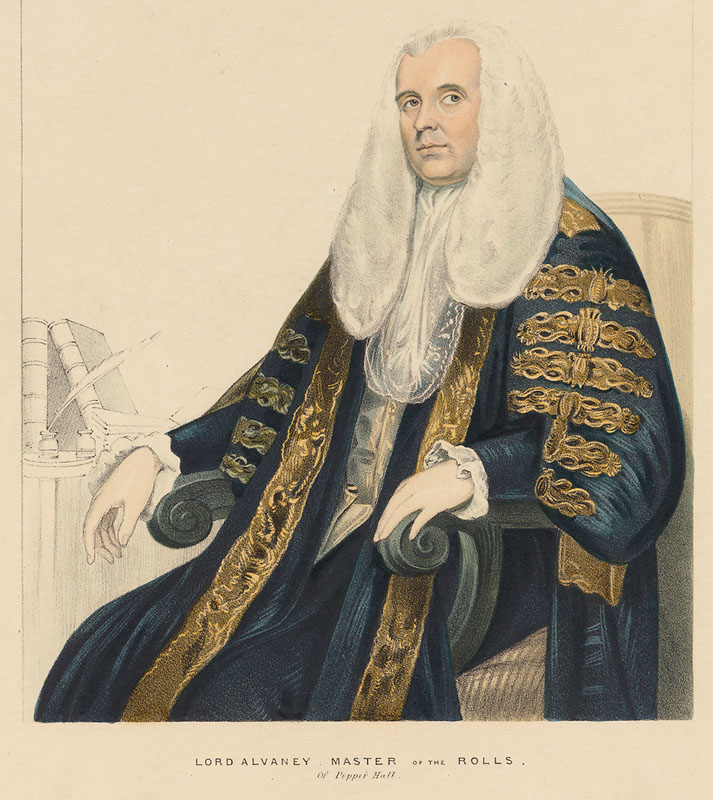
Richard Arden, 1st Baron Alvanley.

Baron Alvanley, of Alvanley in the County Palatine of Chester, was a title in the Peerage of the United Kingdom. It was created on 22 May 1801 for Sir Richard Arden, the Chief Justice of the Common Pleas and former Master of the Rolls. The title became extinct on the death of his second son, the third Baron (who had succeeded his elder brother), in 1857.

== Barons Alvanley (1801) ==
- Richard Pepper Arden, 1st Baron Alvanley (1744–1804)
- William Arden, 2nd Baron Alvanley (1789–1849)
- Richard Pepper Arden, 3rd Baron Alvanley (1792–1857)

== Arms ==
Coat of arms of Baron Alvanley
Crest Out of a ducal coronet Or five ostrich feathers Argent charged with a crescent Gules. Escutcheon Gules three cross-crosslets fitchée Or on a chief of the second a crescent of the first. Supporters Two talbots the dexter Argent collared Gules thereon three arrows of the first the sinister Sable thereon three arrows Gules. Motto Patientiâ Vinces
