= Lloyd Tyrell-Kenyon, 4th Baron Kenyon =

British peer

The Right Honourable The Lord Kenyon KCVO TD
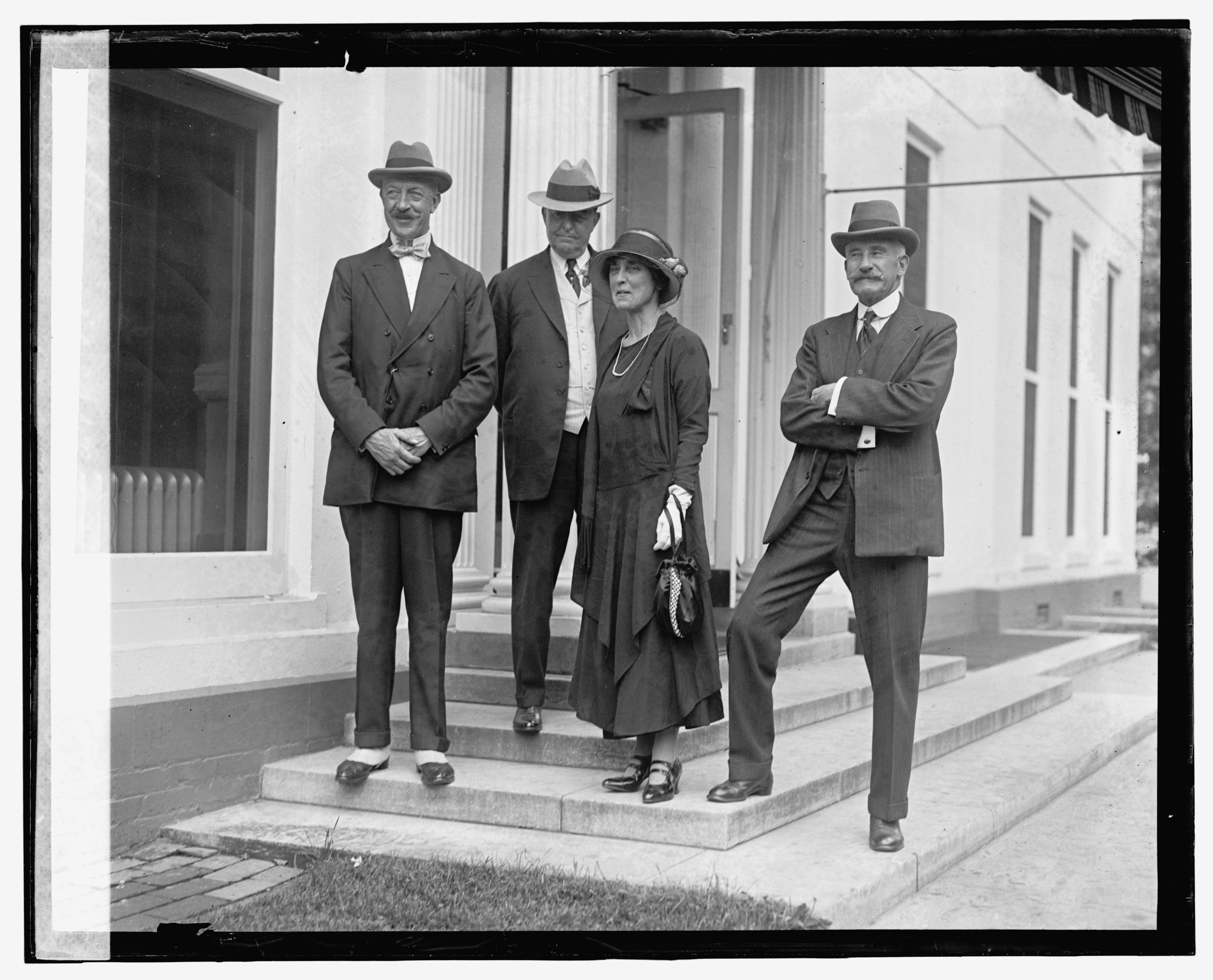

Lord Lieutenant of Denbighshire
- In office 1918–1927
- Monarch: George V
- Preceded by: William Cornwallis West
- Succeeded by: Sir Watkin Williams-Wynn

Lord-in-waiting
- In office 1900–1905
- Monarchs: Victoria, Edward VII
- Preceded by: The Lord Harris
- Succeeded by: The Lord Acton

Personal details
- Born: 5 July 1864
- Died: 30 November 1927 (aged 63)
- Party: Conservative
- Spouse: Gwladys Howard (m. 1916)
- Children: Lloyd
- Education: Christ Church, Oxford

Military service
- Rank: Colonel

Lloyd Tyrell-Kenyon, 4th Baron Kenyon, KCVO, TD (5 July 1864 – 30 November 1927), was a British peer and Conservative politician.

== Family background and education ==
Born in Wilmore Crescent, west London, Kenyon was the son of the Hon. Lloyd Kenyon, son of Lloyd Kenyon, 3rd Baron Kenyon, and Fanny Bulkeley-Owen. He succeeded his grandfather as fourth Baron Kenyon in 1869. He was educated at Eton College and entered Christ Church, Oxford in 1882.

== Political career ==
Lord Kenyon took his seat in the House of Lords on his 21st birthday in 1885. In December 1900 he was appointed a Lord-in-waiting (government whip in the House of Lords) in the Conservative government of Lord Salisbury, a post he retained until 1905, the last three years under the leadership of Arthur Balfour. He served the same post again, in the coalition Government of David Lloyd George, from 1916 to 1918.

He also took part in local politics for a period as member of Flintshire County Council, was a D.L. and J.P. for the county of Shropshire and J.P. for Flintshire county.

== Other public services and honours ==
Apart from his political career he also served as Lord Lieutenant of Denbighshire from 1918 to his death. He was Pro-Chancellor of the University of Wales from 1910 and President of the North Wales University College from 1903, as well as President of the National Museum of Wales from 1923. In 1924 he became Chairman of the Agricultural Wages Board and the Milk Advisory Committee.

Lord Kenyon succeeded Stanley Leighton as treasurer of the Salop Infirmary in Shrewsbury in 1901.

Lord Kenyon served as Lord-in-waiting to Queen Victoria, then also Edward VII between 1900–05, and then George V 1916-18. He was made KCVO in 1907 and was a Knight of Grace of the Order of St John of Jerusalem. He was also a Grand Cross of the Order of the Dannebrog of Denmark and the Order of the Crown of Italy.

== Military service ==
Lord Kenyon served in the Shropshire Yeomanry, being promoted lieutenant in 1886, Captain in 1889, and Major on 14 December 1901. He was lieutenant-colonel commanding the regiment from 1907 to 1912. He was then promoted full colonel and made A.D.C. to King George V in 1912.

In the First World War he served at home as commanding officer of the 2/1st Welsh Horse Yeomanry from 1914 to 1916.

He was awarded the TD in 1909.

== Family life and death ==
Lord Kenyon assumed by Royal licence the additional surname of Tyrell in 1912. He married Gwladys Julia Howard, daughter of Colonel Henry Richard Lloyd Howard, in 1916. He died at his home, Gredington Hall, Flintshire, of typhoid contracted from a mosquito bite, in November 1927, aged 63. He was buried at the parish church of St Chad's, Hanmer. He was succeeded in his titles by his only son Lloyd. Lady Kenyon died in 1965.

Coat of arms of Lloyd Tyrell-Kenyon, 4th Baron Kenyon

Crest
A lion sejant Proper resting the dexter forepaw on a cross flory Argent.
Escutcheon
Sable a chevron engrailed Or between three crosses flory Argent.
Supporters
Two female figures the dexter representing Truth vested in white her head irradiated on her breast a sun and in her right hand a mirror all Proper; the sinister representing Fortitude clad in a corset of mail robe Or mantle Gules on her head a casque plumed Gules in her right hand a branch of oak and her left arm resting on a pillar Proper.

Political offices
Preceded by The Lord Harris	Lord-in-waiting; 1900–1905	Succeeded by The Lord Acton
Honorary titles
Preceded by William Cornwallis West	Lord Lieutenant of Denbighshire; 1918–1927	Succeeded by Sir Robert Williams-Wynn, Bt
Peerage of Great Britain
Preceded by Lloyd Kenyon	Baron Kenyon; 1869–1927	Succeeded by Lloyd Tyrell-Kenyon
