= Beevor baronets =

Title in the Baronetage of Great Britain

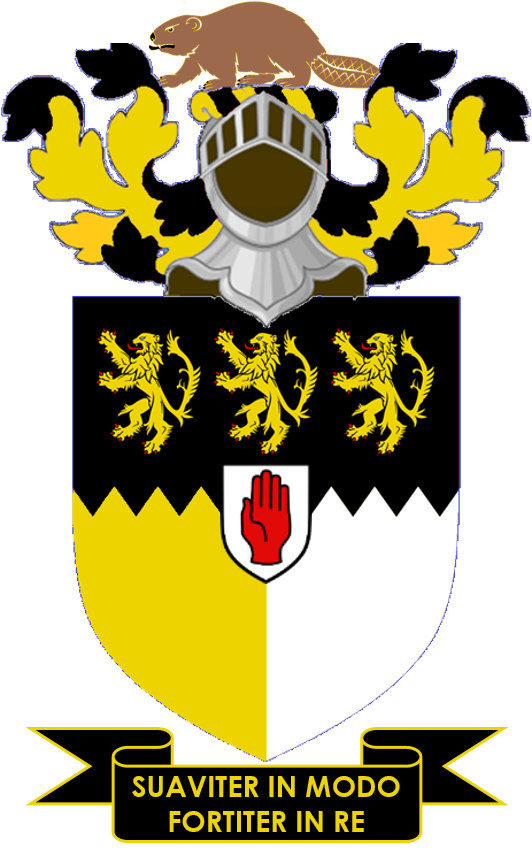
Arms: Per pale Or and Argent on a Chief indented Sable three Lions rampant of the first; Crest: A Beaver passant proper; Motto: Suaviter in Modo, Fortiter in Re (Gentle in manner, but vigorous in deed)

The Beevor baronetcy, of Hethel in the County of Norfolk, is a title in the Baronetage of Great Britain. It was created on 22 January 1784 for the prominent agriculturalist Thomas Beevor. The title has descended in the direct line from father to son.

== Beevor baronets, of Hethel (1784) ==
- Sir Thomas Beevor, 1st Baronet (1726–1814)
- Sir Thomas Beevor, 2nd Baronet (1753–1820)
- Sir Thomas Branthwaite Beevor, 3rd Baronet (1798–1879)
- Sir Thomas Beevor, 4th Baronet (1823–1885)
- Sir Hugh Reeve Beevor, 5th Baronet (1858–1939)
- Sir Thomas Lubbock Beevor, 6th Baronet (1897–1943)
- Sir Thomas Agnew Beevor, 7th Baronet (1929–2017)
- Sir Thomas Hugh Cunliffe Beevor, 8th Baronet (born 1962)

The heir apparent is the current holder's elder son, Thomas William Harvey Beevor (born 1990).

== Notes ==
Baronetage of Great Britain
Preceded by FitzHerbert baronets	Beevor baronets of Hethel; 22 January 1784	Succeeded by Kenyon baronets
