= James Wallace (British politician) =

British politician

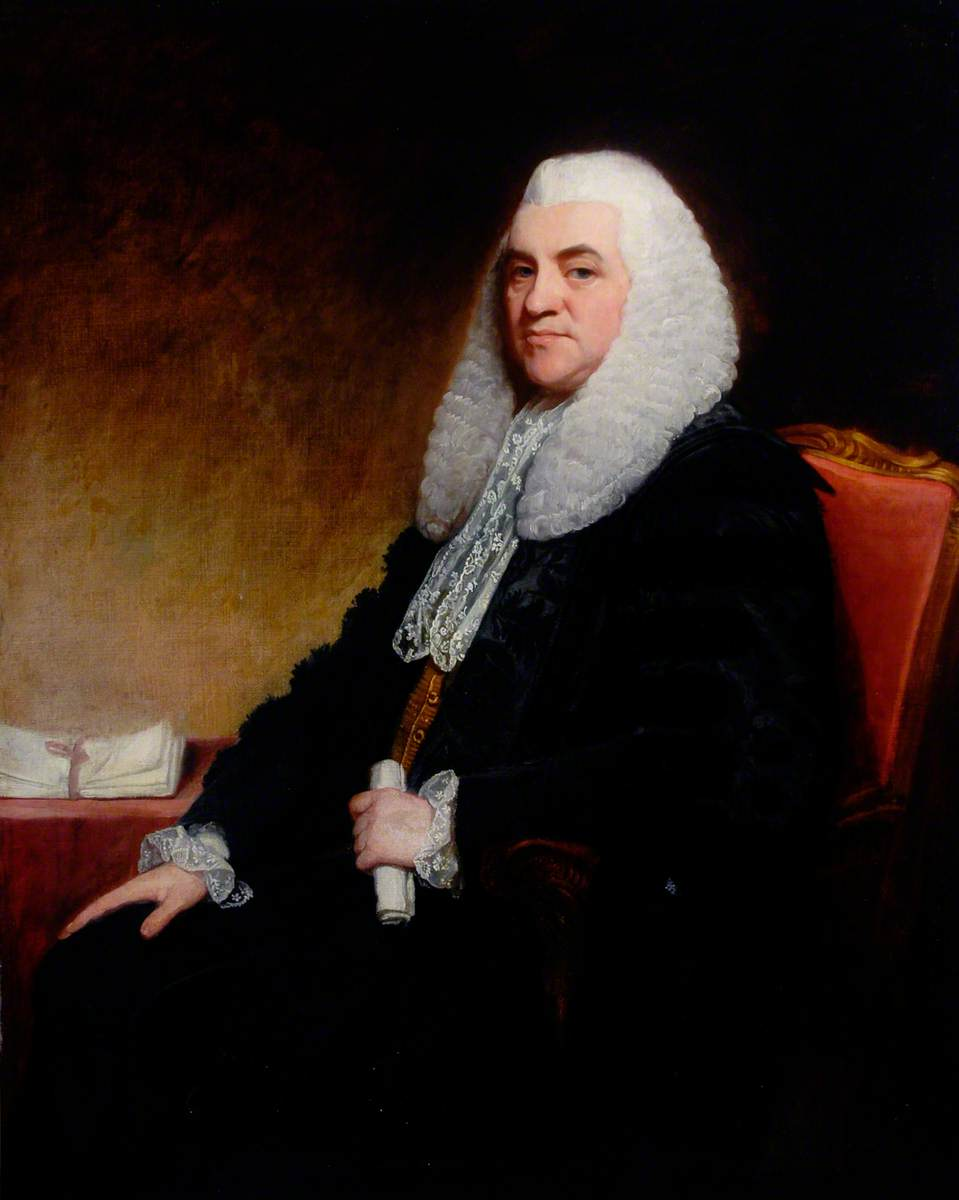
Lord James Wallace (1729–1783), painting by George Romney, 1780.

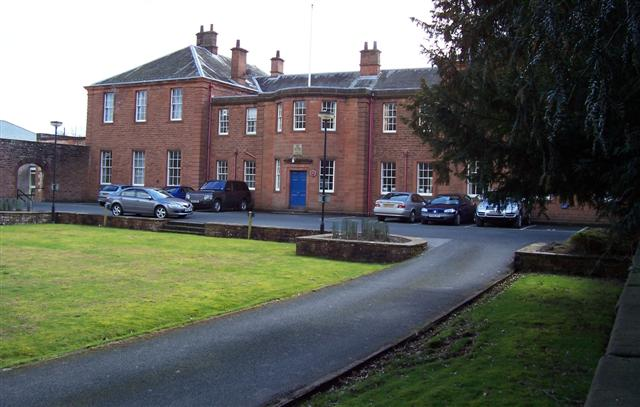
Carleton Hall

James Wallace (1729–1783), of Carleton Hall, Cumbria, was an English barrister, Member of Parliament, Solicitor General and Attorney General.

== Life ==
The son of Thomas Wallace, of Asholme, Northumberland, attorney-at-law, Wallace entered Lincoln's Inn and was called to the Bar in 1757. In 1770, he was elected as one of the Members of Parliament for Horsham in Sussex. In 1778, he was appointed Solicitor General for England and Wales and in 1780 Attorney General.

He died in 1783 and was buried in Exeter Cathedral. On 8 January 1767 Wallace had married Elizabeth, only daughter and sole heiress of Thomas Simpson, Esquire, of Carleton Hall, Cumberland, and they had two children, his son and heir Thomas Wallace, 1st Baron Wallace who married Jean Hope, and Elizabeth (1770–1792) who died unmarried.

Parliament of Great Britain
Preceded by James Grenville; Robert Pratt	Member of Parliament for Horsham; 1770–1783; With: Robert Pratt 1770–1774; Jeremiah Dyson 1774–1776; The Earl of Drogheda 1776–1780; Viscount Lewisham 1780; George Osborn 1780–1783	Succeeded by James Craufurd; George Osborn
Legal offices
Preceded by Alexander Wedderburn	Solicitor General for England and Wales; 1778–1780	Succeeded by James Mansfield
Preceded by Alexander Wedderburn	Attorney General for England and Wales; 1780–1782	Succeeded by Lloyd Kenyon
Preceded by Lloyd Kenyon	Attorney General for England and Wales; 1783	Succeeded by John Lee
