= Lloyd Kenyon, 3rd Baron Kenyon =

Coat of arms of Lloyd Kenyon, 3rd Baron Kenyon
Crest A lion sejant Proper resting the dexter forepaw on a cross flory Argent. Escutcheon Sable a chevron engrailed Or between three crosses flory Argent. Supporters Two female figures the dexter representing Truth vested in white her head irradiated on her breast a sun and in her right hand a mirror all Proper; the sinister representing Fortitude clad in a corset of mail robe Or mantle Gules on her head a casque plumed Gules in her right hand a branch of oak and her left arm resting on a pillar Proper.

Lloyd Kenyon, 3rd Baron Kenyon (1 April 1805 – 14 July 1869), was a British peer and Member of Parliament.

Kenyon was the son of George Kenyon, 2nd Baron Kenyon, and Margaret Emma Hanmer. His grandfather was Lloyd Kenyon, 1st Baron Kenyon, Master of the Rolls and Lord Chief Justice of England. Kenyon was elected to the House of Commons for the rotten borough of St Michael's (also known as Mitchell) in 1830, a seat he held until 1832, when the constituency was disfranchised by the Reform Act 1832. In 1855 he succeeded his father as third Baron Kenyon and entered the House of Lords.

Lord Kenyon married Hon. Georgiana de Grey, daughter of Thomas de Grey, 4th Baron Walsingham, in 1833. He died in July 1869, aged 64, and was succeeded in his titles by his grandson Lloyd. His second son George Thomas Kenyon was MP for Denbigh Boroughs. Lady Kenyon died in 1874.

== Notes ==
Parliament of the United Kingdom
Preceded by Henry Labouchere; William Leake	Member of Parliament for St Michael's; 1830–1832; With: John Heywood Hawkins 1830–1831; William Samuel Best 1831–1832	Constituency abolished
Peerage of Great Britain
Preceded by George Kenyon	Baron Kenyon; 1855–1869	Succeeded by Lloyd Tyrell-Kenyon
