= Solicitor General for England and Wales =

Law officer in the UK government

- Royal Arms of His Majesty's Government

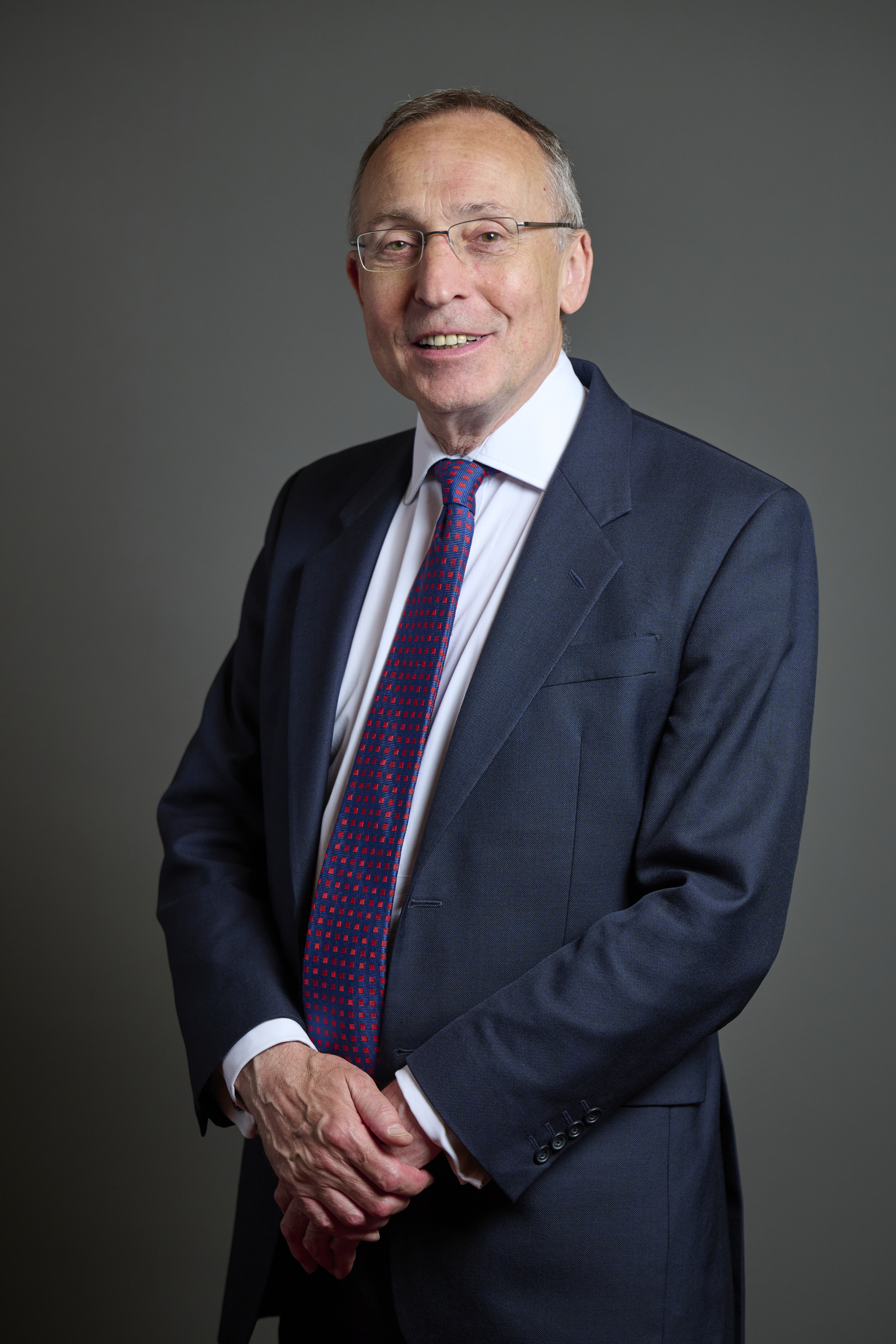
- Incumbent; Andy Slaughter since 21 July 2026
- Attorney General's Office
- Style: Solicitor
- Reports to: Attorney General for England and Wales
- Appointer: The Monarch; on the advice of the Prime Minister
- Term length: At His Majesty's Pleasure
- Formation: Before 1460
- Salary: £142,106 per annum (2022) (including £84,144 MP salary)
- Website: www.attorneygeneral.gov.uk

His Majesty's Solicitor General for England and Wales, known informally as the Solicitor General, is one of the law officers of the Crown in the government of the United Kingdom. They are the deputy of the Attorney General, whose duty is to advise the Crown and Cabinet on the law. They exercise the powers of the Attorney General which are delegated to them under section 1 of the Law Officers Act 1997. Despite the title, the position is usually held by a barrister as opposed to a solicitor.

There is also a Solicitor General for Scotland, who is the deputy of the Lord Advocate. As well as the Sovereign's Solicitor General, the Prince of Wales and a Queen consort (when the Sovereign is male) are also entitled to have an Attorney and Solicitor General, though the present Prince of Wales has only an Attorney General and no Solicitor General.

The Solicitor General is addressed in court as "Mr Solicitor" or "Ms Solicitor". The Solicitor General is shadowed by the Shadow Solicitor General who sits on the Official Opposition frontbench.

The current holder of the position is Andy Slaughter.

== Solicitors-General of England (and Wales), 1461–present ==
=== 15th century ===
incomplete

- Richard Fowler 1461–1470
- Richard Page 1470-1483
- Thomas Lynon 1483–1485
- Andrew Dimmock 1485–1503

=== 16th century ===
- Thomas Lucas 1503–1507
- John Ernley 1507–1514
- John Port 1514–1521
- Richard Lyster 1521–1525
- Christopher Hales 1525–1531
- Baldwin Mallet 1531–1533
- Richard Rich 1533–1536
- William Whorwood 1536–1540
- Henry Bradshaw 1540–1545
- Edward Griffin 1545–1552
- John Gosnold 1552–1553
- William Cordell 1553–1557
- Richard Weston 1557–1559
- William Rosewell 1559–1566
- Richard Onslow 1566–1569
- Sir Thomas Bromley 1569–1579
- Sir John Popham 1579–1581
- Sir Thomas Egerton 1581–1592
- Sir Edward Coke 1592–1594
- Thomas Fleming 1595–1604

=== 17th century ===
- Sir John Doderidge 1604–1607
- Sir Francis Bacon 1607–1613
- Henry Yelverton 1613–1617
- Sir Thomas Coventry 1617–1621
- Sir Robert Heath 1621–1625
- Sir Richard Shelton 1625–1634
- Sir Edward Littleton 1634–1640
- Sir Edward Herbert 1640–1641
- Oliver St John 1641–1643 (continued to 1648 under parliament)
- Sir Thomas Gardiner 1643–1645
- Sir Geoffrey Palmer 1645–1649
- Edmund Prideaux 1648–1649
- John Cooke 1649–1650
- Robert Reynolds 1650–1654
- William Ellis 1654–1660
- Sir Heneage Finch 1660–1670
- Sir Edward Turnor 1670–1671
- Sir Francis North 1671–1673
- Sir William Jones 1673–1674
- Sir Francis Winnington 1674–1679
- Heneage Finch 1679–1686
- Sir Thomas Powys 1686–1687
- Sir William Williams 1687–1689
- Sir George Treby 1689
- Sir John Somers 1689–1692
- Sir Thomas Trevor 1692–1695
- Sir John Hawles 1695–1702

=== 18th century ===
- Sir Simon Harcourt 1702–1707
- Sir James Montagu 1707–1708
- Robert Eyre 1708–1710
- Sir Robert Raymond 1710–1714
- Nicholas Lechmere 1714–1715
- John Fortescue Aland 1715–1717
- Sir William Thomson 1717–1720
- Sir Philip Yorke 1720–1724
- Sir Clement Wearg 1724–1725
- Charles Talbot 1726–1733
- Sir Dudley Ryder 1733–1737
- John Strange 1737–1742
- William Murray 1742–1754
- Sir Richard Lloyd 1754–1756
- Charles Yorke 1756–1762
- Sir Fletcher Norton 1762–1763
- William de Grey 1763–1766
- Edward Willes 1766–1768
- John Dunning 1768–1770
- Edward Thurlow 1770–1771
- Alexander Wedderburn 1771–1778
- James Wallace 1778–1780
- James Mansfield 1780–1782
- John Lee 1782
- Richard Pepper Arden 1782–1783
- John Lee 1783
- James Mansfield 1783
- Richard Pepper Arden 1783–1784
- Archibald Macdonald 1784–1788
- Sir John Scott 1788–1793
- Sir John Mitford 1793–1799
- William Grant 1799–1801

=== 19th century ===
- Spencer Perceval 1801–1802
- Sir Thomas Manners-Sutton 1802–1805
- Sir Vicary Gibbs 1805–1806
- Sir Samuel Romilly 1806–1807
- Sir Thomas Plumer 1807–1812
- Sir William Garrow 1812–1813
- Sir Robert Dallas 1813
- Sir Samuel Shepherd 1813–1817
- Sir Robert Gifford 1817–1819
- Sir John Copley 1819–1824
- Sir Charles Wetherell 1824–1826
- Sir Nicholas Conyngham Tindal 1826–1829
- Sir Edward Sugden 1829–1830
- Sir William Horne 1830–1832
- Sir John Campbell 1832–1834
- Sir Charles Pepys 1834
- Sir Robert Rolfe 1834
- William Webb Follett 1834–1835
- Robert Rolfe 1835–1839
- Sir Thomas Wilde 1839–1841
- Sir William Webb Follett 1841–1844
- Sir Frederic Thesiger 1844–1845
- Sir Fitzroy Kelly 1845–1846
- John Jervis 1846
- Sir David Dundas 1846–1848
- Sir John Romilly 1848–1850
- Sir Alexander Cockburn 1850–1851
- Sir William Page Wood 1851–1852
- Sir Fitzroy Kelly 1852
- Sir Richard Bethell 1852–1856
- James Stuart-Wortley 1856–1857
- Sir Henry Singer Keating 1857–1858
- Sir Hugh Cairns 1858–1859
- Sir Henry Singer Keating 1859
- Sir William Atherton 1859–1861
- Sir Roundell Palmer 1861–1863
- Sir Robert Collier 1863–1866
- Sir William Bovill 1866
- Sir John Burgess Karslake 1866–1867
- Sir Charles Jasper Selwyn 1867–1868
- Sir William Brett 1868
- Sir Richard Baggallay 1868
- Sir John Coleridge 1868–1871
- Sir George Jessel 1871–1873
- Sir Henry James 1873
- Sir William Harcourt 1873–1874
- Sir Richard Baggallay 1874
- Sir John Holker 1874–1875
- Sir Hardinge Giffard 1875–1880
- Sir Farrer Herschell 1880–1885
- Sir John Eldon Gorst 1885–1886
- Sir Horace Davey 1886
- Sir Edward Clarke 1886–1892
- Sir John Rigby 1892–1894
- Sir Robert Reid 1894
- Sir Frank Lockwood 1894–1895
- Sir Robert Finlay 1895–1900

=== 20th century ===
Name	Portrait	Term of office		Political party	Prime Minister	Attorney General
Sir Edward Carson		7 May 1900	4 December 1905	Irish Unionist Alliance	3rd Marquess of Salisbury	Sir Robert Finlay
Sir Edward Carson		7 May 1900	4 December 1905	Irish Unionist Alliance	Arthur Balfour	Sir Robert Finlay
Sir William Robson		12 December 1905	28 January 1908	Liberal	Sir Henry Campbell-Bannerman	Sir John Lawson Walton
Sir Samuel Evans		28 January 1908	6 March 1910	Liberal	Sir Henry Campbell-Bannerman	Sir William Robson
Sir Samuel Evans		28 January 1908	6 March 1910	Liberal	H. H. Asquith	Sir William Robson
Sir Rufus Isaacs		6 March 1910	7 October 1910	Liberal	H. H. Asquith	Sir William Robson
Sir John Simon		7 October 1910	19 October 1913	Liberal	H. H. Asquith	Sir Rufus Isaacs
Sir Stanley Buckmaster		19 October 1913	8 November 1915	Liberal	H. H. Asquith	Sir John Simon
Sir F. E. Smith		2 June 1915	8 November 1915	Conservative	H. H. Asquith	Sir Edward Carson
Sir George Cave		8 November 1915	10 December 1915	Conservative	H. H. Asquith	Sir Frederick E. Smith
Sir Gordon Hewart		10 December 1915	10 January 1919	Liberal	David Lloyd George	Sir Frederick E. Smith
Sir Ernest Pollock		10 January 1919	6 March 1922	Conservative	David Lloyd George	Sir Gordon Hewart
Sir Leslie Scott		6 March 1922	19 October 1922	Conservative	David Lloyd George	Sir Ernest Pollock
Sir Thomas Inskip		31 October 1922	22 January 1924	Conservative	Bonar Law	Sir Douglas Hogg
Sir Thomas Inskip		31 October 1922	22 January 1924	Conservative	Stanley Baldwin	Sir Douglas Hogg
Sir Henry Slesser		23 January 1924	3 November 1924	Labour	Ramsay MacDonald	Sir Patrick Hastings
Sir Thomas Inskip		11 November 1924	28 March 1928	Conservative	Stanley Baldwin	Sir Douglas Hogg
Sir Boyd Merriman		28 March 1928	5 June 1929	Conservative	Stanley Baldwin	Sir Thomas Inskip
Sir James B. Melville		7 June 1929	22 October 1930	Labour	Ramsay MacDonald	Sir William Jowitt
Sir Stafford Cripps		22 October 1930	24 August 1931	Labour	Ramsay MacDonald	Sir William Jowitt
Sir Thomas Inskip		3 September 1931	26 January 1932	Conservative	Ramsay MacDonald	Sir William Jowitt
Sir Boyd Merriman		26 January 1932	29 September 1933	Conservative	Ramsay MacDonald	Sir Thomas Inskip
Sir Donald Somervell		29 September 1933	19 March 1936	Conservative	Ramsay MacDonald	Sir Thomas Inskip
Sir Donald Somervell		29 September 1933	19 March 1936	Conservative	Stanley Baldwin	Sir Thomas Inskip
Sir Terence O'Connor		19 March 1936	7 May 1940	Conservative	Stanley Baldwin	Sir Donald Somervell
Sir Terence O'Connor		19 March 1936	7 May 1940	Conservative	Neville Chamberlain	Sir Donald Somervell
Sir William Jowitt		15 May 1940	4 March 1942	Labour	Winston Churchill	Sir Donald Somervell
Sir David Maxwell Fyfe		4 March 1942	25 May 1945	Conservative	Winston Churchill	Sir Donald Somervell
Sir Walter Monckton		29 May 1945	26 July 1945	Conservative	Winston Churchill	Sir David Maxwell Fyfe
Sir Frank Soskice		4 August 1945	24 April 1951	Labour	Clement Attlee	Sir Hartley Shawcross
Sir Lynn Ungoed-Thomas		24 April 1951	26 October 1951	Labour	Clement Attlee	Sir Frank Soskice
Sir Reginald Manningham-Buller		3 November 1951	8 October 1954	Conservative	Winston Churchill	Sir Lionel Heald
Sir Harry Hylton-Foster		18 October 1954	22 October 1959	Conservative	Winston Churchill	Sir Reginald Manningham-Buller
Sir Harry Hylton-Foster		18 October 1954	22 October 1959	Conservative	Winston Churchill; Anthony Eden; Harold Macmillan	Sir Reginald Manningham-Buller
Sir Harry Hylton-Foster		18 October 1954	22 October 1959	Conservative	Harold Macmillan	Sir Reginald Manningham-Buller
Sir Jocelyn Simon		22 October 1959	8 February 1962	Conservative	Harold Macmillan	Sir Reginald Manningham-Buller
Sir John Hobson		8 February 1962	19 July 1962	Conservative	Harold Macmillan	Sir Reginald Manningham-Buller
Sir Peter Rawlinson		19 July 1962	16 October 1964	Conservative	Harold Macmillan; Alec Douglas-Home	Sir John Hobson
Sir Dingle Foot		18 October 1964	24 August 1967	Labour	Harold Wilson	Sir Elwyn Jones
Sir Arthur Irvine		24 August 1967	19 June 1970	Labour	Harold Wilson	Sir Elwyn Jones
Sir Geoffrey Howe		23 June 1970	5 November 1972	Conservative	Edward Heath	Sir Peter Rawlinson
Sir Michael Havers		5 November 1972	4 March 1974	Conservative	Edward Heath	Sir Peter Rawlinson
Peter Archer		7 March 1974	4 May 1979	Labour	Harold Wilson; James Callaghan	Sam Silkin
Sir Ian Percival		5 May 1979	13 June 1983	Conservative	Margaret Thatcher	Sir Michael Havers
Sir Patrick Mayhew		13 June 1983	13 June 1987	Conservative	Margaret Thatcher	Sir Michael Havers
Sir Nicholas Lyell		13 June 1987	15 April 1992	Conservative	Margaret Thatcher; John Major	Sir Patrick Mayhew
Sir Derek Spencer		15 April 1992	2 May 1997	Conservative	John Major	Sir Nicholas Lyell
Lord Falconer of Thoroton		6 May 1997	28 July 1998	Labour	Tony Blair	John Morris
Sir Ross Cranston		28 July 1998	11 June 2001	Labour	Tony Blair	Lord Williams of Mostyn

=== 2001–present ===
Colour key (for political parties):
Conservative Labour

Name	Portrait	Term of office		Political party	Prime Minister	Attorney General
Harriet Harman		11 June 2001	10 May 2005	Labour	Tony Blair	Lord Goldsmith
Mike O'Brien		11 May 2005	29 June 2007	Labour	Tony Blair	Lord Goldsmith
Dame Vera Baird		29 June 2007	11 May 2010	Labour	Gordon Brown	Baroness Scotland of Asthal
Sir Edward Garnier		13 May 2010	4 September 2012	Conservative	David Cameron	Dominic Grieve
Sir Oliver Heald		4 September 2012	15 July 2014	Conservative	David Cameron	Dominic Grieve
Sir Robert Buckland		15 July 2014	9 May 2019	Conservative	David Cameron	Jeremy Wright
Sir Robert Buckland		15 July 2014	9 May 2019	Conservative	Theresa May	Geoffrey Cox
Lucy Frazer		9 May 2019	25 July 2019	Conservative	Theresa May	Geoffrey Cox
Sir Michael Ellis		25 July 2019	2 March 2021	Conservative	Boris Johnson	Geoffrey Cox; Suella Braverman
Lucy Frazer		2 March 2021	10 September 2021	Conservative	Boris Johnson	Michael Ellis
Sir Michael Ellis		10 September 2021	16 September 2021	Conservative	Boris Johnson	Suella Braverman
Alex Chalk		16 September 2021	5 July 2022	Conservative	Boris Johnson	Suella Braverman
Edward Timpson		7 July 2022	7 September 2022	Conservative	Boris Johnson	Suella Braverman
Michael Tomlinson		7 September 2022	7 December 2023	Conservative	Liz Truss	Michael Ellis
Michael Tomlinson		7 September 2022	7 December 2023	Conservative	Rishi Sunak	Victoria Prentis
Robert Courts		7 December 2023	5 July 2024	Conservative	Rishi Sunak	Victoria Prentis
Sarah Sackman		9 July 2024	2 December 2024	Labour	Keir Starmer	Lord Hermer
Lucy Rigby		2 December 2024	6 September 2025	Labour	Keir Starmer	Lord Hermer
Ellie Reeves		6 September 2025	20 July 2026	Labour	Keir Starmer	Lord Hermer
Andy Slaughter		21 July 2026	Incumbent	Labour	Andy Burnham	Ellie Reeves

== See also ==
- Solicitor general
- Attorney General for England and Wales
- Law officers of the Crown
