= Richard Pepper Arden, 1st Baron Alvanley =

British judge and politician

The Right Honourable The Lord Alvanley PC KC
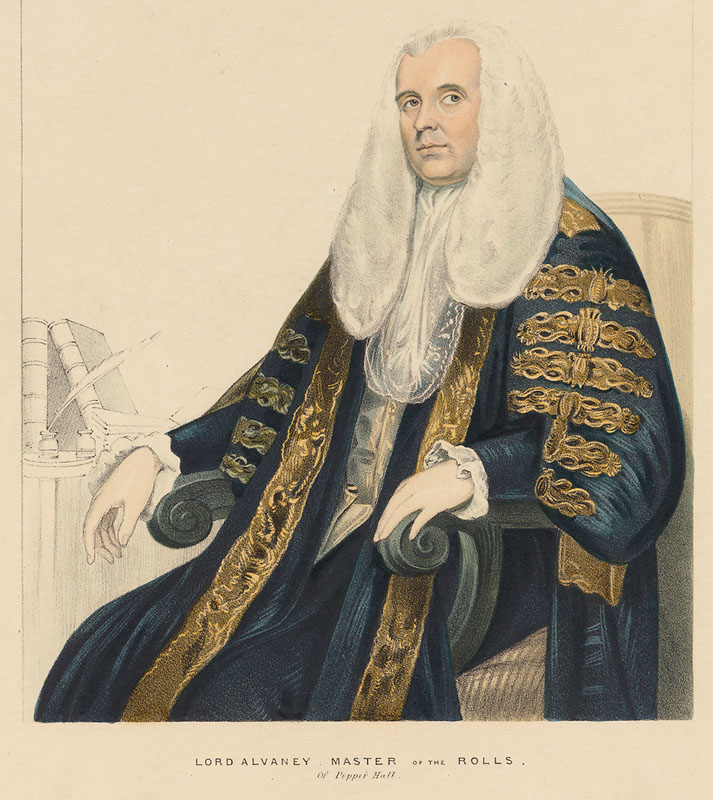

Chief Justice of the Court of Common Pleas
- In office 23 May 1801 – 19 March 1804
- Monarch: George III
- Preceded by: The Lord Eldon
- Succeeded by: Sir James Mansfield

Master of the Rolls
- In office 1788–1801
- Monarch: George III
- Preceded by: Sir Lloyd Kenyon
- Succeeded by: Sir William Grant

Attorney General
- In office 1784–1788
- Monarch: George III
- Prime Minister: William Pitt the Younger
- Preceded by: Lloyd Kenyon
- Succeeded by: Sir Archibald Macdonald

Personal details
- Born: 20 June 1744 Bredbury, England
- Died: 19 March 1804 (aged 59)
- Party: Whig
- Spouse: Anne Dorothea Wilbraham-Bootle (m. 1784)
- Children: 7, including William and Richard
- Education: Trinity College, Cambridge

Richard Pepper Arden, 1st Baron Alvanley PC KC (20 May 1744 – 19 March 1804) was a British barrister and Whig politician, who served as the Chief Justice of the Court of Common Pleas. He was previously a Member of Parliament from 1783 to 1801.

== Biography ==
He was born on 20 May 1744 in Bredbury, the son of John Arden (1709–1787), and Sarah Pepper, and baptised on 20 June 1744 in Stockport. Educated at The Manchester Grammar School, he matriculated at Trinity College, Cambridge in November 1761 and received his BA in 1766.

Arden was admitted to the Middle Temple in 1769, and received his MA from Trinity the same year, being made a Fellow of the college shortly after.

He took chambers in Lincoln's Inn and became a close friend of William Pitt, with whom he would maintain a political alliance throughout his career. In 1776 he was made judge on the South Wales circuit. Invested as a King's Counsel in 1780, he was Solicitor General during the ministry of Shelburne, and again for a year under Pitt the Younger. At this time he entered the House of Commons as the Whig MP for Newtown, representing the seat from 1783 to 1784. In 1784 he became MP for Aldborough, and was appointed Attorney General and Chief Justice of Chester, posts he would hold until 1788.

On 4 June 1788, he was again advanced to become Master of the Rolls, and was knighted on 18 June 1788. He was also appointed to the Privy Council that year. In 1790, he left Aldborough to become MP for Hastings until 1794, and then for Bath until 1801.

In May 1801, he was appointed Chief Justice of the Court of Common Pleas, and on 22 May 1801, was created Baron Alvanley, of Alvanley, in the County of Chester. Alvanley died on 19 March 1804 and was buried a week later in Rolls Chapel, London. His will was probated in April 1804.

According to William E. A. Axon in the Dictionary of National Biography: "He was not a man of great oratorical powers, but possessed the qualities of intelligence, readiness and wit... It would be vain to claim any great distinction for Lord Alvanley. He was a learned lawyer and a successful politician... the few productions that remain from his pen evince refinement, taste and facility of expression."

== Family ==
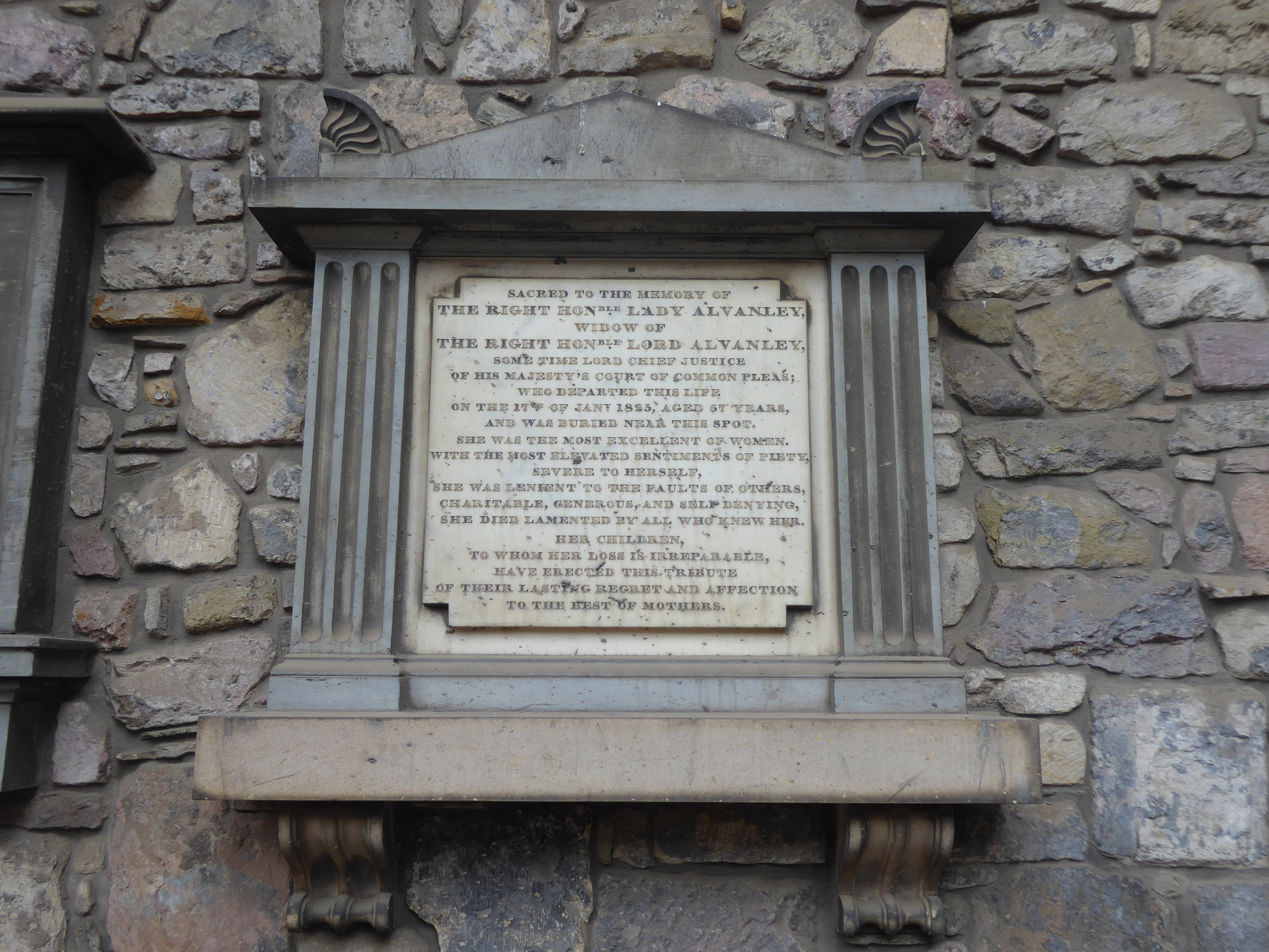
The grave of Anne, Lady Alvanley, Holyrood Abbey

On 9 September 1784, Arden married Anne Dorothea Wilbraham-Bootle (1757–1825), daughter of Richard Wilbraham-Bootle and Mary Bootle. Their children were:

- John Arden (1786–1787)
- Sarah Arden (d. 1787)
- William Arden, 2nd Baron Alvanley (1789–1849), died unmarried.
- Marianne Arden (d. 1791)
- Frances Henrietta Arden (1792–1852), married on 25 June 1831 to Sir John Warrender of Lochend, 5th Baronet, son of Sir Patrick Warrender of Lochend.
- Richard Pepper Arden, 3rd Baron Alvanley (1792–1857), married Lady Arabella Vane, daughter of William Henry Vane, 1st Duke of Cleveland and Lady Catherine Margaret Powlett.
- Katherine Emma Arden (1794–1875)

Coat of arms of Richard Pepper Arden, 1st Baron Alvanley
Crest Out of a ducal coronet Or five ostrich feathers Argent charged with a crescent Gules. Escutcheon Gules three cross-crosslets fitchée Or on a chief of the second a crescent of the first. Supporters Two talbots the dexter Argent collared Gules thereon three arrows of the first the sinister Sable thereon three arrows Gules. Motto Patientiâ Vinces

== Notes ==
Parliament of Great Britain
Preceded by John Barrington; Henry Dundas	Member of Parliament for Newtown; 1783–1784; With: John Barrington	Succeeded by John Barrington; James Worsley
Preceded by Sir Samuel Fludyer, Bt; John Gally Knight	Member of Parliament for Aldborough; 1784–1790; With: John Gally Knight	Succeeded by John Gally Knight; Trench Chiswell
Preceded by John Dawes; John Stanley	Member of Parliament for Hastings; 1790–1794; With: John Stanley	Succeeded by John Stanley; Robert Saunders-Dundas
Preceded by Viscount Bayham; Viscount Weymouth	Member of Parliament for Bath; 1794–1801; With: Viscount Weymouth	Succeeded by Parliament of the United Kingdom
Parliament of the United Kingdom
Preceded by Parliament of Great Britain	Member of Parliament for Bath; 1801; With: Lord John Thynne	Succeeded by Lord John Thynne; John Palmer
Legal offices
Preceded by John Lee	Solicitor General; 1782–1783	Succeeded by John Lee
Preceded by James Mansfield	Solicitor General; 1783–1784	Succeeded by Archibald Macdonald
Preceded by Lloyd Kenyon	Attorney General; 1784–1788	Succeeded by Sir Archibald Macdonald
Preceded by Sir Lloyd Kenyon	Master of the Rolls; 1788–1801	Succeeded by Sir William Grant
Preceded by The Lord Eldon	Chief Justice of the Common Pleas; 1801–1804	Succeeded by Sir James Mansfield
Peerage of the United Kingdom
New creation	Baron Alvanley; 1801–1804	Succeeded by William Arden
