= Lloyd Kenyon, 1st Baron Kenyon =

British politician and barrister

The Right Honourable The Lord Kenyon PC
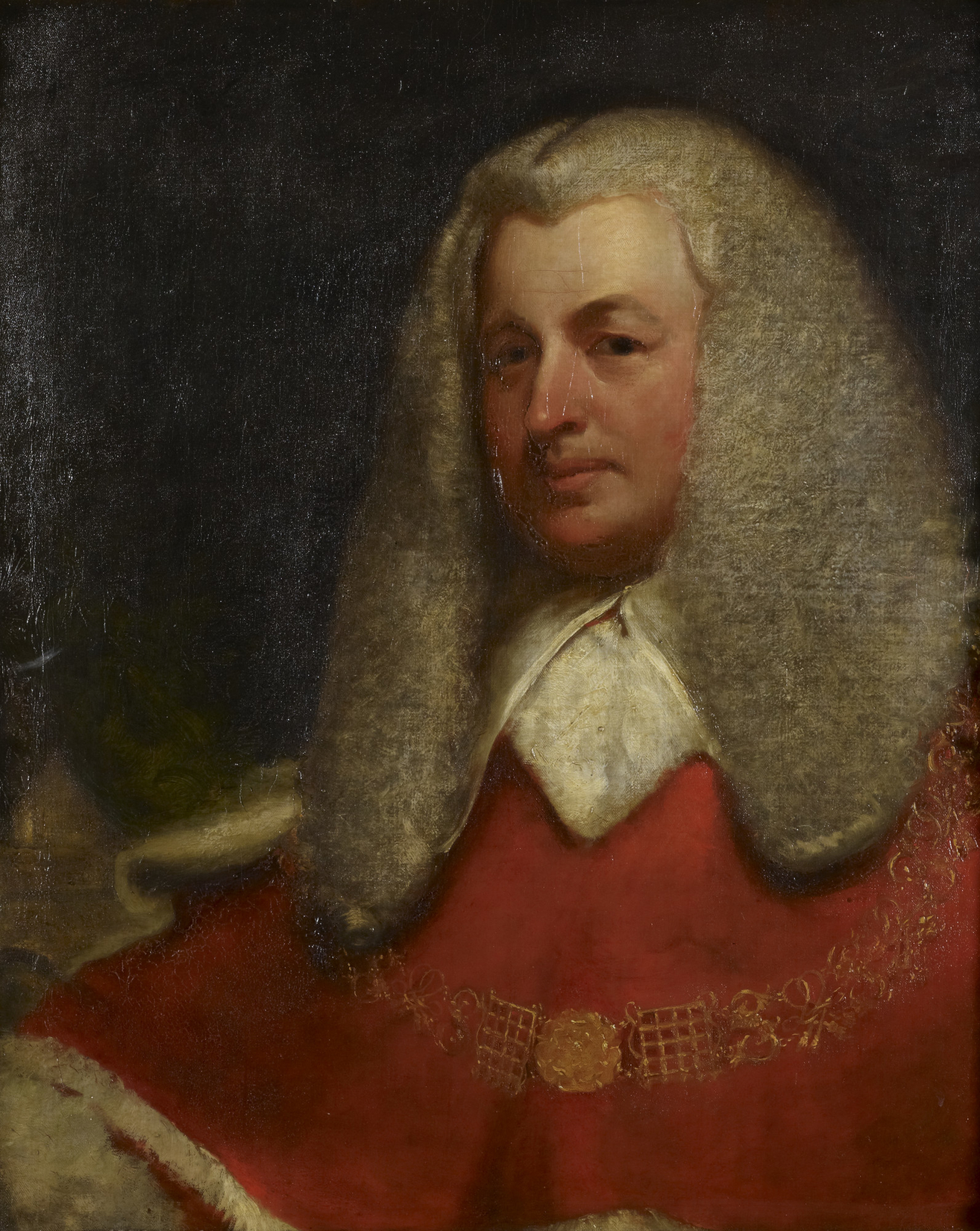
- Lord Kenyon, by William Davison (floruit 1843)

Lord Chief Justice
- In office 4 June 1788 – 11 April 1802
- Monarch: George III
- Preceded by: The Earl of Mansfield
- Succeeded by: The Lord Ellenborough

Master of the Rolls
- In office 30 March 1784 – 4 June 1788
- Preceded by: Sir Thomas Sewell
- Succeeded by: Sir Richard Arden (later Lord Alvanley)

Attorney General
- In office 26 December 1783 – 31 March 1784
- Prime Minister: Pitt the Younger
- Preceded by: John Lee
- Succeeded by: Sir Richard Arden (later Lord Alvanley)
- In office 18 April 1782 – 2 May 1783
- Preceded by: James Wallace
- Succeeded by: James Wallace

Personal details
- Born: Lloyd Kenyon; 5 October 1732 Gredington, Flintshire, Wales
- Died: 4 April 1802 (aged 69) Bath, England
- Profession: Barrister

Lloyd Kenyon, 1st Baron Kenyon, PC (5 October 1732 – 4 April 1802), was a British politician and barrister, who served as Attorney General, Master of the Rolls and Lord Chief Justice. Born to a country gentleman, he was initially educated in Hanmer before moving to Ruthin School aged 12. Rather than going to university he instead worked as a clerk to an attorney, joining the Middle Temple in 1750 and being called to the Bar in 1756. Initially almost unemployed due to the lack of education and contacts which a university education would have provided, his business increased thanks to his friendships with John Dunning, who, overwhelmed with cases, allowed Kenyon to work many, and Lord Thurlow who secured for him the Chief Justiceship of Chester in 1780. He was returned as the Member of Parliament (MP) for Hindon the same year, serving repeatedly as Attorney General under William Pitt the Younger. He effectively sacrificed his political career in 1784 to challenge the ballot of Charles James Fox, and was rewarded with a baronetcy; from then on he did not speak in the House of Commons, despite remaining an MP.

On 27 March 1784, he was appointed Master of the Rolls, a job to which he dedicated himself once he ceased to act as an MP. He had previously practised in the Court of Chancery, and although unfamiliar with Roman law was highly efficient; Lord Eldon said "I am mistaken if, after I am gone, the Chancery Records do not prove that if I have decided more than any of my predecessors in the same period of time, Sir Lloyd Kenyon beat us all". On 9 June 1788, Kenyon succeeded Lord Mansfield as Lord Chief Justice, and was granted a barony. Although not rated as highly as his predecessor, his work "restored the simplicity and rigor of the common law". He remained Lord Chief Justice until his death in 1802.

== Early life and education ==
Kenyon was born on 5 November 1732 in Gredington, Flintshire, to Lloyd Kenyon, a country gentleman and Justice of the peace, and his wife, Jane Eddowes. He was initially educated at a school in Hanmer – it was written that "no man ever set out on his career with fewer advantages" than Kenyon. When he was 12 he was sent to Ruthin School, where he learnt French and Latin, and was considered one of the best students at the school. His knowledge of Greek was non-existent, and his scientific training minor; "he was said to have believed to his dying day that the sun goes around the earth". As a second son, he had initially considered joining the clergy, but instead decided on the law and spent 5 years working as a clerk to Mr W. J. Tomkinson, an attorney. He proved to be an excellent clerk, becoming a "rapid and accurate conveyancer". Originally happy with the idea of being a simple attorney, after the death of his older brother it was instead assumed he would become a barrister, and Kenyon joined the Middle Temple in November 1750. In February 1755 he left Tomkinson's practice and moved to London, where he was called to the Bar on 10 February 1756.

== Career as a barrister ==
Without the education or connections that a university education would have provided he was almost entirely unemployed for several years. Kenyon instead lived off an £80 allowance from his father, and money from his richer relatives, spending the time watching Lord Mansfield conduct cases at the Court of King's Bench. His early business was almost entirely conveyancing, and to make extra money he began to attend the Welsh Circuit, where Tomlinson's contacts allowed him to pick up some small cases. After several years of this he also began attending quarter sessions at Oxford, Stafford and Shrewsbury, "where he was more successful". While his work slowly began to increase, his main rise was due to his friendship with John Dunning, at the time a similarly near-unemployed barrister. In 1762 one of the leaders of the Northern Circuit died, and his work was given to Dunning; as he found himself with too many cases, he gave many to Kenyon. In 1767, for example, Kenyon dealt with 20 of Dunning's cases. As a result of his speedy and efficient work attorneys began to employ him directly, and within 10 years he was making £3,000 a year just from opinions.

Kenyon's next rise came about as a result of his introduction to the Duke of Richmond, who was struggling with Sir James Lowther for the control of several Parliamentary constituencies. Kenyon went with Richmond to Carlisle and Cockermouth as his lawyer, and secured the constituencies for Richmond; as a result, Richmond chose to employ Kenyon as his lawyer from then onwards. In 1780 he successfully defended Lord George Gordon for high treason, assisted by Thomas Erskine, and the resulting fame was enough to propel him further up the ranks of his profession and within the political sphere. At the same time he became friends with Lord Thurlow, and when the holder of the Chief Justiceship of Chester died that year, Thurlow ensured that it was given to Kenyon. The rise of Kenyon's work in the Court of Chancery was also attributed to his friendship with Thurlow, who as Lord Chancellor was the head of the Court.

== Political career ==
When Parliament was dissolved in 1780, Thurlow ensured that Kenyon was returned as a Member of Parliament for Hindon. In April 1782, on the formation of the Rockingham government, Kenyon was made Attorney General for England and Wales, despite having never sat in the lower office of Solicitor General or spoken in Parliament. As Attorney General he spoke on only one subject, on 18 June 1782, in regards to the amount of money owed to the Exchequer by the Paymaster of the Forces. This provoked the opposition of Charles James Fox, whose father, Lord Holland, had profited greatly by that office; Kenyon's programme could have ruined Fox by making him liable for refunding his father's profits as Paymaster. On the death of Rockingham Kenyon continued in his post under the Shelburne Ministry, but left office in April 1783 when that government fell to the Fox-North Coalition. He instead allied himself with William Pitt the Younger, leading the opposition to the first Act of the new government and strongly supporting an opposition bill to reform the Exchequer. When the new government was dismissed on 19 December and Pitt took control, Kenyon was again made Attorney-General. He again took the lead on the issue of the Paymaster of the Forces, and commanded that Richard Rigby, Paymaster until 1782, "do deliver to the House an account of the balance of all public money remaining in his hands on the 13th day of November last", something Rigby complained was against common practice.

In 1784 Thomas Sewell died, and, as was tradition, Kenyon succeeded him as Master of the Rolls on 27 March. Initially intending to withdraw from Parliament, Kenyon was persuaded to remain as an MP and Attorney General to increase Pitt's majority. Having purchased the seat of Tregony he "was resolved to go the whole hog", and became one of the strongest and most visible supporters of Pitt. With his contacts in Wales, he secured votes for several ministerial candidates in Welsh constituencies. In an attempt to have Charles James Fox removed as an MP he had Fox's ballot challenged; while this backfired, he was awarded with a baronetcy for the effective sacrifice of his political career. As a result of this controversy he stated that "legislation was a task to which he had by no means thought himself equal", and stayed silent in Parliament for the rest of his life.

== Judicial career ==
Having withdrawn from politics, Kenyon instead switched his focus to his job as Master of the Rolls. As a judge of the Court of Chancery he was required to deal with cases of equity; though he was almost entirely unfamiliar with the Roman law it was based on, he had previously practised in the Chancery. He was not considered as good as his successor, Sir William Grant, but Lord Eldon wrote that "I am mistaken if, after I am gone, the Chancery Records do not prove that if I have decided more than any of my predecessors in the same period of time, Sir Lloyd Kenyon beat us all". With the retirement of Lord Mansfield as Lord Chief Justice, Kenyon succeeded him on 9 June 1788, and was made Baron Kenyon of Gredington, in the county of Flint.

Kenyon's appointment was initially greeted with caution by his fellow barristers, who worried that, as he had practised in a court of equity rather than a court of common law, he might be unfamiliar with the area covered by his new posting in the Court of King's Bench. Despite this, he was noted as an excellent judge, although one who suffered from an "excess of zeal" in moral issues. One of his flaws was his defective education; he was too proud to avoid exhibiting his ignorance. He was particularly noted for using Latin incorrectly, leading George III to say "My Lord... it would be well if you would stick to your good law and leave off your bad Latin". As a judge, Kenyon over-ruled the principles that a court of law could not consider trusts or a pecuniary legacy; it was said that he "restored the simplicity and rigor of the common law". After nearly one and a half decades as a judge, Kenyon died on 4 April 1802 in Bath.

== Personal life ==
In 1773 he married his cousin, Mary Kenyon, with whom he had three sons; Lloyd, who predeceased him, George, and Thomas. Kenyon was noted by John Campbell, 1st Baron Campbell as "a man of wonderful quickness of perception, of considerable intellectual nimbleness, of much energy of purpose, and of unwearied industry", although Campbell noted that, thanks to Kenyon's lack of a university education, he knew only "the corner of jurisprudence which he professionally cultivated; he had not even the information generally picked up by the clever clerk of a country attorney". He was noted as arrogant, despising things he did not understand and condemning any opinions he disagreed with regardless of his knowledge of them. He never attempted to reform the judicial system, and "his habits of sordid parsimony brought discredit on the high station which he filled". Campbell, however, has been criticized as a biographer. When his Lives of the Chief Justices was published, which included his biography of Lord Kenyon, the Law Magazine commented that "Lord Campbell has confounded, or not rightly understood, the distinction between true and false. His political virus oozes out in sly general remarks and bantering innuendoes." (Law Magazine vol.43, p5, 209.) Despite this, as a judge he was seen as "profound in legal erudition, patient in judicial discrimination, and of the most determined integrity".

== Arms ==
Coat of arms of Lloyd Kenyon, 1st Baron Kenyon
Crest A lion sejant Proper resting the dexter forepaw on a cross flory Argent. Escutcheon Sable a chevron engrailed Or between three crosses flory Argent. Supporters Two female figures the dexter representing Truth vested in white her head irradiated on her breast a sun and in her right hand a mirror all Proper; the sinister representing Fortitude clad in a corset of mail robe Or mantle Gules on her head a casque plumed Gules in her right hand a branch of oak and her left arm resting on a pillar Proper.

== Bibliography ==
- Campbell, John (2006). The Lives of the Chief Justices of England: From the Norman Conquest till the death of Lord Tenterden. Vol. 3. Elibron Classics. ISBN 0-543-95981-3.
- Chalmers, Alexander (1815). The General biographical dictionary. Vol. 19. J. Nichols. OCLC 311534524.
- Chisholm, Hugh, ed. (1911). "Kenyon, Lloyd Kenyon, 1st Baron" . Encyclopædia Britannica. Vol. 15 (11th ed.). Cambridge University Press. pp. 748–749.
- Foss, Edward (1843). The grandeur of the law: or, the legal peers of England : with sketches of their professional career. E. Spettigue. OCLC 264881725.
- Kenyon, George T. (1990). The life of Lloyd, first Lord Kenyon: Lord chief justice of England. Wm. S. Hein Publishing. ISBN 0-8377-0778-1.
- Phillips, Richard (1807). Public characters [Formerly British public characters] of 1798–9 – 1809–10. J. Adlard. OCLC 503918503.
- Townsend, William C. (1846). The lives of twelve eminent judges of the last and of the present century. Longman. OCLC 60719586.

Parliament of Great Britain
Preceded by Henry Dawkins; Archibald Macdonald	Member of Parliament for Hindon; 1780–1784; With: Nathaniel William Wraxall	Succeeded by William Egerton; Edward Bearcroft
Preceded by John Stephenson; John Dawes	Member of Parliament for Tregony; 1784–1788; With: Robert Kingsmill	Succeeded by Robert Kingsmill; Hugh Seymour-Conway
Legal offices
Preceded by John Morton	Chief Justice of Chester; 1780–1784	Succeeded by Richard Pepper Arden
Preceded by James Wallace	Attorney General; 1782–1783	Succeeded by James Wallace
Preceded by John Lee	Attorney General; 1783–1784	Succeeded by Richard Pepper Arden
Preceded by Sir Thomas Sewell	Master of the Rolls; 1784–1788	Succeeded by Sir Richard Pepper Arden
Preceded by Sir William Murray	Lord Chief Justice; 1788–1802	Succeeded by Edward Law
Honorary titles
Preceded by Sir Roger Mostyn, Bt	Lord Lieutenant of Flintshire; 1796–1798	Succeeded by Viscount Belgrave
Vacant Title last held by The Earl of Plymouth	Custos Rotulorum of Flintshire; 1796–1802	Succeeded by The Earl Grosvenor
Peerage of Great Britain
New creation	Baron Kenyon; 1788–1802	Succeeded by George Kenyon
Baronetage of Great Britain
New creation	Baronet (of Gredington, Flint); 1784–1802	Succeeded by George Kenyon
