= Alexander Leith =

Alexander Leith may refer to:

- Sir Alexander Leith (British Army officer) (1774–1859)
- Sir Alexander Leith, 1st Baronet, of Newcastle-upon-Tyne (1869–1956)
- Sir Alexander Leith, 1st Baronet, of Burgh St Peter (1741–1780), British soldier and politician
- Alexander Forbes-Leith, 1st Baron Leith of Fyvie (1847–1925)
- Sir Alexander William Wellesley Leith, 3rd Baronet (1806–1842), of the Leith-Buchanan baronets
- Sir Alexander Wellesley George Thomas Leith-Buchanan, 5th Baronet (1866–1925), of the Leith-Buchanan baronets
