= Leith-Ross =

Leith-Ross is a surname. Notable people with the surname include:

- Frederick Leith-Ross (1887–1968), British economic adviser
- Harry Leith-Ross (1886–1973), British painter
- Sylvia Leith-Ross (1884–1980), English anthropologist

== See also ==
- Leith (surname)
- Ross (surname)
- Leith Ross
