= Bernard Hale =

English-born barrister and judge

Sir Bernard Hale (1677–1729) was an English-born barrister and judge who became Chief Baron of the Irish Exchequer. Two of his sons became Generals in the British Army.

== Background ==
He was born at King's Walden, Hertfordshire, the eighth son of William Hale MP and his wife Mary Elwes, daughter of Jeremy (Jeremiah) Elwes of Roxby, Lincolnshire. The Hale family, who made a fortune as grocers in London, had owned their estate in King's Walden since the sixteenth century, and Bernard's own descendants were still living there in Victorian times. Bernard's grand-uncle, also called Bernard Hale, was Archdeacon of Ely 1660–1663.

The judge's sister Catherine Hoskins (1673-1703) was the mother of Catherine Cavendish, Duchess of Devonshire. Another sister Mary Plumer was the mother of the long-serving MP William Plumer.

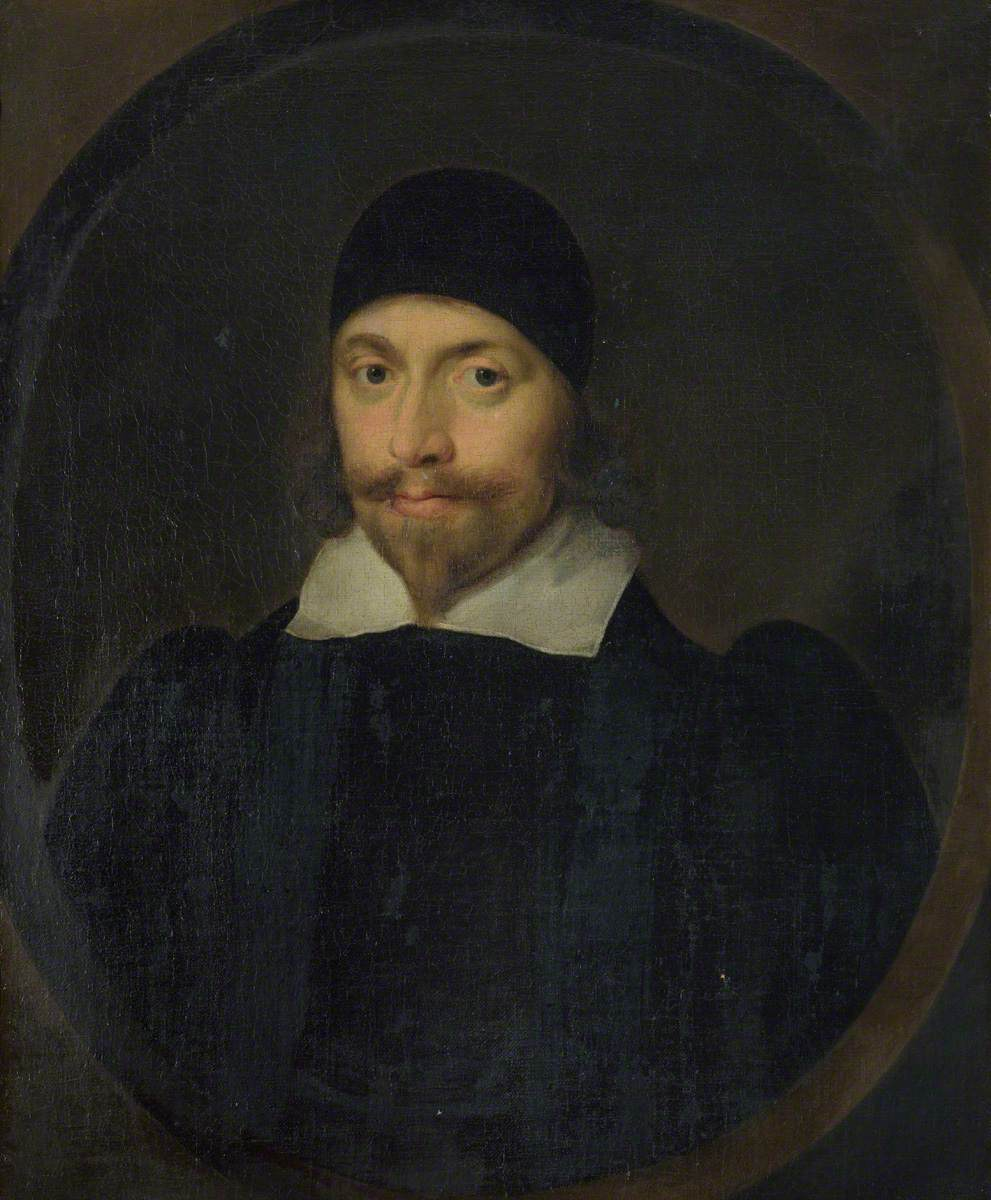
Bernard Hale, Archdeacon of Ely, the judge's grand-uncle

Bernard was educated at Eton College and Peterhouse, Cambridge, where his grand-uncle Bernard had been Master in the 1660s, matriculating at Peterhouse in 1695, graduating B.A. in 1699 and M.A. in 1702: he subsequently became a fellow of Peterhouse. He entered Gray's Inn in 1699, and was called to the Bar in 1705. He became one of the leaders of the English Bar, and was one of its top earners. He later transferred to Lincoln's Inn, and was briefly one of its Benchers.

== Family ==
He married Anne Thoresby (or Thursby) daughter of John Thoresby of Northampton. They had seven children:

- William Hale (died 1793), who married Elizabeth Farnaby, daughter of Sir Charles Farnaby, 1st Baronet. They had four children, including Anne, wife of Sir Edward Dering, 7th Baronet, and William, husband of the Hon. Mary Grimston, daughter of James Grimston, 2nd Viscount Grimston and Mary Bucknall;
- Richard Hale (died 1812);
- General Bernard Hale (died 1798), who married Martha Rigby, sister of the leading statesman Richard Rigby, and had a son Francis Hale Rigby;
- General John Hale, Governor of Londonderry (died 1806); he married the noted beauty Mary Chaloner, daughter of William Chaloner of Guisborough (she was painted by Joshua Reynolds), and had twenty-one children, almost all of whom reached adulthood;
- Catherine Hale, who married Thomas Nugent;
- Jane Hale (died 1794), who married Reverend Martin Madan (1726-1790), a clergyman noted for his controversial views on marriage, and in particular his book Thelyphthora, a defence of polygamy. They had five children; her portrait was painted by Allan Ramsay.
- Anne Hale, unmarried.

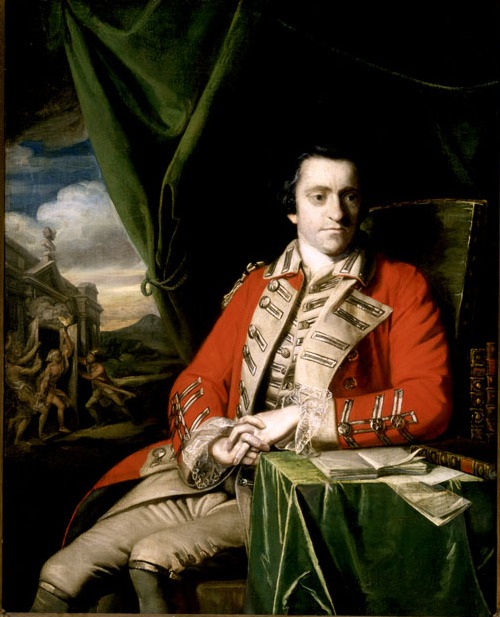
Chief Baron Hale's youngest son John Hale, Governor of Londonderry, painted by Joshua Reynolds

== Irish career ==
In 1722 he was appointed Chief Baron of the Irish Exchequer, and earned a high reputation in Ireland for integrity and efficiency, despite an initially hostile reception, "the usual Dublin railing". In 1725 he and the junior Baron, Sir John St Leger, narrowly escaped death when on assize at Monaghan: the roof of Monaghan courthouse, which like many Irish courthouses of the time was in an appalling state of repair, fell in. It narrowly missed the judges, who however escaped injury. Hale adjourned proceedings to outside the building and continued the assize.

Later the same year, it was rumoured that he was to be appointed Lord Chancellor of Ireland. In fact he was offered the office of Lord Chief Justice of Ireland: but his English colleagues advised him to refuse it, on the ground that he would shortly be offered a place on the English Bench. Hale admitted that the prospect of being Irish Lord Chief Justice was tempting enough to "perplex him", but his preference was to go back to England. Although he had been happy enough in Ireland, he admitted that "it is impossible for me to forget England or not to wish to return there".

== Last years ==
He went back to England in the autumn of 1725 to take up office as a Baron of the Exchequer: to qualify for that office he was made a Serjeant-at-law, and received a knighthood.

He died at Red Lion Square, London in 1729, and was buried in the parish church at King's Walden.

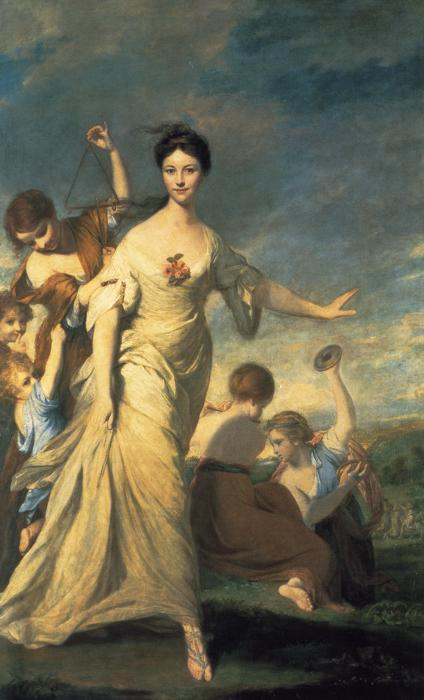
Bernard's daughter-in-law Mary Chaloner, wife of John Hale, painted by Joshua Reynolds

== Arms ==
Coat of arms of Bernard Hale

Escutcheon
Azure a chevron bretessed Or a martlet for difference (below the dexter chief point Or).
