= Peter Wentworth =

16th-century English politician

The Honourable Peter Wentworth
- Arms of Wentworth: Sable, a chevron between three leopard's faces or
- Born: 1524
- Died: 10 November 1597 (aged 72–73); Tower of London
- Occupation: Politician
- Spouses: Lettice Lane; Elizabeth Walsingham (died 1596)
- Children: with Elizabeth: Nicholas Wentworth; Walter Wentworth; Thomas Wentworth; Frances Wentworth; Mary Wentworth
- Parents: Sir Nicholas Wentworth; Jane Josselyn
- Family: Wentworth

Peter Wentworth (1524 – 10 November 1597) was a prominent Puritan leader in the Parliament of England. He was the elder brother of Paul Wentworth and entered as member for Barnstaple in 1571. He later sat for the Cornish borough of Tregony in 1578 and for the town of Northampton in the parliaments of 1586–7, 1589, and 1593. Wentworth was the chief critic of Queen Elizabeth I, and Wentworth's 1576 Parliament address has been regarded as the sign of a new era in English Parliament politicking. Recorded speeches and parliament sessions, jotted in the diaries of MPs like those of Thomas Cromwell, began to proliferate around this time, when public interest embraced political affairs and when issues such as freedom of speech took root in parliamentary politics. For these reasons, Wentworth is often regarded as the first celebrated English parliamentarian.

== Early life ==
He was born in 1524, the 1st son of Sir Nicholas Wentworth (d. 1557) of Lillingstone Lovell, Oxfordshire, chief porter of Calais, and Jane Josselyn (d. 1569), daughter of John Josselyn of Hyde Hall, Sawbridgeworth, Hertfordshire. He was trained for the law in Lincoln's Inn.

He inherited the estate at Lillingstone Lovell on the death of his father in 1557.

== Family ==
Peter Wentworth was twice married; his first wife, Lettice Lane, with whom he had no children, was the daughter of Sir Ralph Lane and Maud Parr, Lady Lane, who was a cousin, confidante and lady-in-waiting of Katherine Parr, and his second was Elizabeth Walsingham (d. 1596), a sister of Sir Francis Walsingham, Elizabeth I's secretary of state. He and Elizabeth had 4 sons and 5 daughters, including:

- Nicholas Wentworth (1561–1613), the eldest son, and heir, married firstly, Susanna Wigston, and secondly, Thomasina Wendy, daughter of Thomas Wendy, of Haslingfield, Cambridgeshire. He inherited the Lillington Lovell estate, and had no involvement in politics.
- Walter Wentworth (d. 1627), of Castle Bytham, Lincolnshire.
- Thomas Wentworth (c.1568–1627}.
- Frances Wentworth, married Walter Strickland, of Boynton, Yorkshire.
- Mary Wentworth (d. 1616), married, on 15 September 1578, Sir Edward Boys, of Nonington, Kent.

== Career ==
He entered Parliament as the MP for Barnstaple in 1571 and Tregony in 1572.

Wentworth firmly supported the liberties of Parliament against encroachments of the royal prerogative, about which he delivered a memorable speech on 8 February 1576. The speech was interrupted before its conclusion due to Wentworth's provocative claims, and officials imprisoned him in the Tower of London. Below are the words that concluded the spoken part of Wentworth's speech.

Amongst other, Mr. Speaker, two things do great hurt in this place, of the which I do mean to speak: the one is a rumour which runneth about the house and this it is, "Take heed what you do, the queen's majesty liketh not such a matter. Whosoever prefereth it, she will be offended with him". Or the contrary, "Her majesty liketh of such a matter. Whosoever speaketh against it, she will be much offended with him". The other: sometimes a message is brought into the house, either of commanding or inhibiting, very injurious to the freedom of speech and consultation. I would to God, Mr. Speaker, that these two were buried in hell, I mean rumours and messages, for wicked they undoubtedly are. The reason is, the devil was the first author of them, from whom proceedeth nothing but wickedness...

It was here that Wentworth was interrupted, and the house decided "that he should be presently committed to the serjeant's ward as prisoner, and so remaining should be examined upon his said speech for the extenuating of his fault therein". The unspoken remainder of Wentworth's speech was preserved from the draft, and its rhetoric and content continue on much in the same manner until its ending. Eventually, Wentworth was released from the Tower after his incarceration there, and he was readmitted to Parliament. In 1586, 1589 and 1593 he was elected to represent Northampton.

In February 1587, Sir Anthony Cope (1548–1614) presented to the Speaker a bill abrogating the existing ecclesiastical law, together with a Puritan revision of the Book of Common Prayer, and Wentworth supported him by bringing forward certain articles touching the liberties of the House of Commons; Cope and Wentworth were both committed to the Tower for interference with Elizabeth I's ecclesiastical prerogative.

== Death ==
In 1593, Wentworth again suffered imprisonment for presenting a petition on the subject of the royal succession; and he did not regain his freedom, dying in the Tower on 10 November 1597. While in the Tower he wrote A Pithie Exhortation to her Majesty for establishing her Successor to the Crown, a notable treatise preserved in the British Library. His wife, Elizabeth, who had shared his captivity, died the previous year, and was buried on 21 July 1596 in the Chapel of St Peter ad Vincula.

His third son, Thomas (c. 1568–1628), was an ardent and sometime violent opponent of royal prerogative in Parliament, of which he became a member in 1604: He represented the city of Oxford from that year until his death and became recorder of Oxford in 1607. Another son, Walter, was also a Member of Parliament, representing Tavistock in 1601.

== Bibliography ==
- Alexander, J. J. (1910). "Tavistock as a Parliamentary Borough. Part I: 1295–1688". Report and Transactions of the Devonshire Association for the Advancement of Science, Literature and Art. Vol. 42. Plymouth: W. Brendon and Son. pp. 258–277.
- Dean, David (January 2008). "Wentworth, Peter (1524–1597)". Oxford Dictionary of National Biography (online ed.). Oxford University Press. doi:10.1093/ref:odnb/29051. (Subscription, Wikipedia Library access or UK public library membership required.)
- Graves, Michael A. R. (1987). Elizabethan Parliaments, 1559–1601. Seminar Studies in History. London: Longman. ISBN 0-582-35516-8. OCLC 13525340.
- Hartley, T. E., ed. (1981). Proceedings in the Parliaments of Elizabeth I, 1558-1581. Vol. 1. Leicester: Leicester University Press. p. 422. ISBN 9780718511814. OCLC 60053536.
- Hasler, P. W., ed. (1981). "Wentworth, Peter (1524-97), of Lillingstone Lovell, Oxon.". The History of Parliament: the House of Commons 1558-1603. Archived from the original on 19 February 2025 – via History of Parliament Online.
- James, Susan E. (January 2008). "Lane [née Parr], Maud [Matilda], Lady Lane (c. 1507–1558/9)". Oxford Dictionary of National Biography (online ed.). Oxford University Press. doi:10.1093/ref:odnb/70800. (Subscription, Wikipedia Library access or UK public library membership required.)
- Neale, J. E. (January 1924). "Peter Wentworth". The English Historical Review. 39 (153): 36–54.
- Rutton, William Loftie (1891). Three Branches of the Family of Wentworth:I. Wentworth of Nettlestead, Suffolk. II. Wentworth of Gosfield, Essex. III. Wentworth of Lillingstone Lovell, Oxfordshire. London: [Mitchell and Hughes]. pp. 219–244. OCLC 845828893.
- Wentworth, John (1878). The Wentworth Genealogy: English and American. Vol. 1 (2nd ed.). Boston: Little, Brown and Company. pp. 28–31. OCLC 613159447.

=== Attribution ===
Parliament of England
Preceded by Arthur Bassett; Robert Apley	Member of Parliament for Barnstaple; 1571; With: Robert Apley	Succeeded by Vincent Skinner; Robert Apley
Preceded by Edward Hastings; Robert Dormer	Member of Parliament for Tregony; 1572–1581; With: William Knollys	Succeeded by John St. Leger; Richard Grafton
Preceded by Richard Knightley; Thomas Catesby	Member of Parliament for Northampton; 1586–1593; With: Richard Knightley 1586–1587; Richard Knollys 1588–1589; Valentine Knightley 1593	Succeeded by Christopher Yelverton; Henry Yelverton
