= John Snow (politician) =

English MP

Member of Parliament for Tregony
- In office 1593–1597 Serving with Arnold Oldisworth
- Preceded by: Richard Penkevell; Christopher Walker
- Succeeded by: Sir Edward Denny; Henry Birde

Member of Parliament for Yarmouth
- In office 1597–1601 Serving with Benedict Barnham
- Preceded by: Robert Dillington; Robert Crosse
- Succeeded by: William Cotton; Stephen Theobald

Personal details
- Died: 1607/1608
- Spouse: Frances Snow (nee Britten)

John Snow (died 1607/8) was an English politician who was MP for Tregony from 1593 till 1597 and then Yarmouth from 1597 till 1601.

He died in 1607 or 1608.
