= Glenkindie Castle =

Listed building in Aberdeenshire, Scotland

Location
- Coordinates: 57.2169°N 2.9571°W

Site history
- Built: 12th or 13th century

Glenkindie Castle was a 16th-century castle, about 3 miles (4.8 km) south-west of Kildrummy, Aberdeenshire, Scotland, at Glenkindie, north of the River Don, 0.5 miles (0.8 km) east of the confluence with the Kindie Burn.

== History ==
The Strachans were the owners of the site and built the original castle in 1595; it was plundered in 1639 by Donald Farquharson of Monaltrie, and burnt in 1644 by Archibald Campbell, 1st Marquess of Argyll. The Leiths acquired the property. The house was remodelled in 1785, and about 1900, to a design by Sydney Mitchell.

== Structure ==
The rebuilt building, Glenkindie House, is a U-plan house, with the opening to the south. The oldest wing, which may date from the 16th century, is the east wing, and it has two storeys and an attic. A matching wing was built in the 17th century, but the main house, on the site of the original castle, dates from the 19th century. It has two storeys, and an off-centre cap-house tower of three storeys.

The windows have quoined surrounds. Within there is a scale-and-platt staircase, which has Ionic columns.

It has been suggested that there may have been a gatehouse, amid a frontal range of buildings.

== See also ==
- Castles in Great Britain and Ireland
- List of castles in Scotland
