= John Hale (British Army officer) =

British Army officer

General John Hale
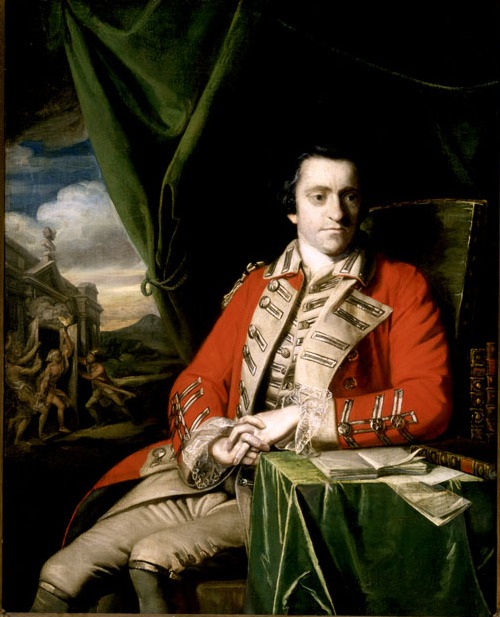
- Portrait by Sir Joshua Reynolds
- Born: 1728; London, England
- Died: 1806 (aged 77–78)

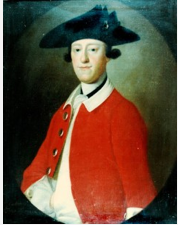
Captain John Hale, 47th Foot

General John Hale (1728–1806) was a British army officer who is remembered chiefly for his close friendship with General James Wolfe, and for his exceptionally large (22) number of children by his wife Mary Chaloner, a noted beauty who was painted by Joshua Reynolds.

== Career ==
As a very young officer, he played a part in suppressing the 1745 Rebellion, an experience which is said to have given him a lifelong aversion to the Scottish nation. He was stationed at Fort Edward earned distinction as a captain in 1755 at the siege of Fort Beauséjour. He later took part in the Siege of Louisbourg as the commander of the 47th Regiment of Foot under James Wolfe. He also commanded the regiment in the Battle of the Plains of Abraham. He was a close friend of General James Wolfe, and it was Hale whom the dying Wolfe ordered to carry his final dispatches back to England. Hale received a grant of Crown lands in Canada, where several of his sons later settled.

John Hale co-owned the privateer Musketo, 120 tons, eighty men, and the Hertford. These vessels sailed on their first cruise in November 1756. The regiment was renumbered the 17th Lancers in 1761. That year they were stationed in Scotland, where Hale's proverbial dislike of Scots people caused him to become engaged in a serious fracas with a toll-keeper, which might have had ended fatally. He was not disgraced, but was personally reprimanded for his conduct by King George III. The following year he acted as secretary to Earl of Albemarle during the Battle of Havana. After 1762 he gradually withdrew from regimental affairs, due it seems to quarrels with some of his fellow officers. In politics he was something of a reformer, and during the Yorkshire by-election of 1785, he made a celebrated speech which was considered by most of the electorate to be dangerously radical.

Hale was promoted to major-general in 1772, lieutenant-general in 1777 and general in 1793. He was appointed Governor of Londonderry in 1776, holding that office until his death in 1806.

== Family ==
John Hale was born in London in 1728, the youngest son of the eminent judge Sir Bernard Hale, former Chief Baron of the Irish Exchequer and his wife Anne Thoresby of Northampton; his father died a few months after he was born. General Bernard Hale was his elder brother. The Hale family came originally from King's Walden in Hertfordshire and were prominent in local politics for generations.

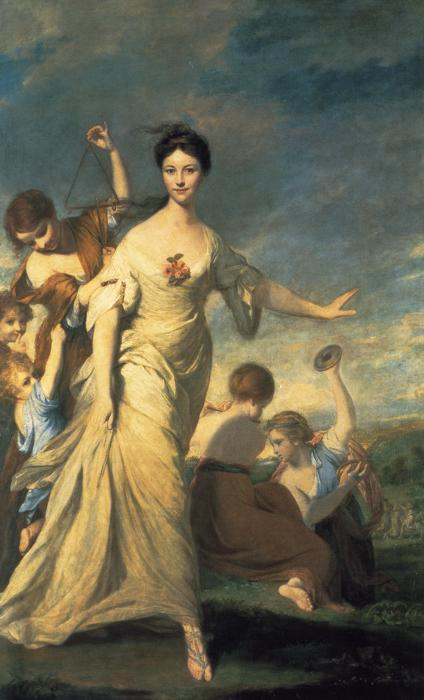
John's 20-year-old wife Mary Chaloner Hale as Euphrosyne, painted by Joshua Reynolds in 1764

On 11 June 1763, the 35-year-old John Hale married a 19-year-old girl named Mary Chaloner (22 December 1743 – 27 October 1803) , a daughter of William Chaloner III of Guisborough and his wife Mary Finny. Mary Hale was almost always pregnant during their marriage, giving birth to twenty-two children, eleven sons and eleven daughters, over 25 years:

- John Jr. (27 March 1764 – 24 December 1838)
- Henry (30 October 1765 – 16 May 1818)
- Bernard (20 January 1767 – 3 November 1801)
- Mary (10 May 1768 – 20 November 1837)
- Ann (10 May 1768 – 5 December 1853)
- Harriet (16 June 1769 – 18 April 1834)
- Thomas (5 July 1770 – 1798)
- Emily (5 July 1770 – 10 March 1851)
- Colonel William (7 July 1771 – 23 November 1856)
- Richard (25 August 1772 – 8 September 1772), died in childhood
- Reverend Richard (10 August 1773 – 27 September 1854)
- George Charles (15 November 1775 – 23 November 1800)
- Frances Isabel (4 November 1776 – 29 May 1796)
- Charlotte (13 February 1778 – 24 October 1832)
- Catherine (23 February 1779 – 22 March 1853)
- Octavia (7 February 1780 – July 1824)
- Francis (6 June 1781 – 26 November 1814)
- Emma (16 June 1782 – May 1861)
- Jane (12 February 1784 – 20 August 1821), married in 1814 Henry Budd
- Elizabeth (12 February 1784 – 19 March 1845)
- Vicesimus (6 March 1788 – January 1826)
- Edward (4 August 1789 – 15 October 1862)

All of their named children survived infancy, and seventeen of the twenty-two outlived their father. Hale bought a farm near Guisborough which he renamed Plantation House, and where the family grew up.

His daughter Harriet married Lawrence Dundas, 1st Earl of Zetland. Her sisters Anne and Mary married Henry Walker Yeoman and Thomas Lewin, respectively. Of his sons, John Jr. had a distinguished political career in Canada; Richard became Vicar of Harewood, a living which was in the gift of his uncle Lord Harewood; and Vicesimus became a judge in India. Francis and Edward were clothiers. None of the general's sons held high military office.

John Hale was not a rich man, and there is good reason to believe that he had some difficulty in providing for so large a family. Although his wife was the sister of a countess, her own will shows that some of their younger sons were badly provided for.

There is a celebrated portrait of Mary Chaloner Hale as Euphrosyne, one of the three Graces, by Sir Joshua Reynolds, who also painted her husband. It now hangs in Harewood House, the home of her sister Anne, who married Edward Lascelles, 1st Earl of Harewood.

Military offices
Preceded by Regiment raised	Colonel of the 17th Light Dragoons; 1763–1770	Succeeded by George Preston
Preceded by The Duke of Argyll	Governor of Limerick; 1770–1775	Succeeded by Sir Henry Clinton
Preceded by Sir John Irwin	Governor of Londonderry; 1776–1806	Succeeded by The Lord Hutchinson
