= Leith baronets =

Set index for Leith baronets

There have been three baronetcies created for persons with the surname Leith, one in the Baronetage of Great Britain and two in the Baronetage of the United Kingdom. As of 2026 two are extant.

- Leith, later Leith-Buchanan baronets (1775): see Leith-Buchanan baronets
- Leith baronets, of Fyvie (1923): see Forbes-Leith baronets of Fyvie
- Leith baronets, of Newcastle upon Tyne (1919): see Sir Alexander Leith, 1st Baronet (1869–1956)
