= John Stephenson (MP died 1794) =

British politician

John Stephenson (c. 1709 – 17 April 1794) was a British Member of Parliament.

He was the son and heir of Thomas Stephenson of Bails and Crosslands, Alston, Cumbria and a Member of Parliament for various boroughs in the south-west from 1754 to 1755 and 1761 until his death in 1794.

He was a director of the British East India Company from 1765 to 1768, and had government victualling contracts in Nova Scotia and Newfoundland at the time of the American Revolution.

Parliament of Great Britain
Preceded by Thomas Clarke; Arnold Nesbitt	Member of Parliament for Mitchell; 1754–1755; With: Robert Clive	Succeeded by Simon Luttrell; Richard Hussey
Preceded by Simon Luttrell; Richard Hussey	Member of Parliament for Mitchell; 1761–1780; With: James Scawen 1761–74; Thomas Howard 1774–79; Francis Hale 1779–80	Succeeded by Francis Hale; William Hanger
Preceded by George Lane Parker; Sir Alexander Leith, Bt	Member of Parliament for Tregony; 1780–1784; With: John Dawes	Succeeded by Lloyd Kenyon; Robert Kingsmill
Preceded by Sir Ralph Payne; James Archibald Stuart	Member of Parliament for Plympton Erle; 1784–1790; With: Paul Trebuy Ourry 1784; John Pardoe 1784–90	Succeeded by Henry Lawes Luttrell; Philip Metcalfe
Preceded by Robert Kingsmill; Hugh Seymour-Conway	Member of Parliament for Tregony; 1790–1794; With: Matthew Montagu	Succeeded by Matthew Montagu; Robert Stewart
