= William Hanger, 3rd Baron Coleraine =

British politician

The Right Honourable The Lord Coleraine
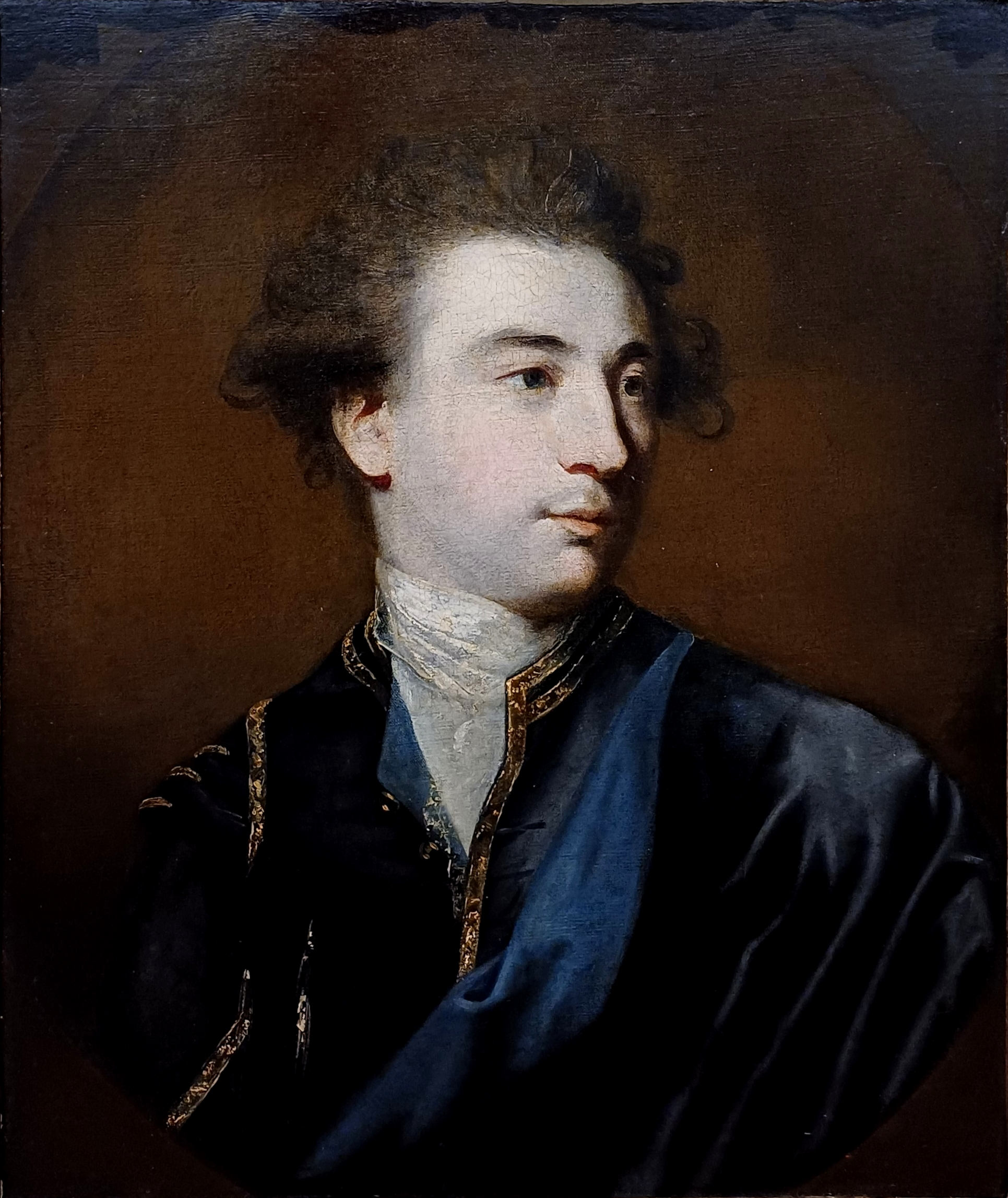
- Born: 6 August 1744; England
- Died: 11 December 1814 (aged 70); England
- Father: Gabriel Hanger

William Hanger, 3rd Baron Coleraine (6 August 1744 – 11 December 1814), styled The Honourable William Hanger between 1762 and 1794, was a British politician.

Hanger was the second surviving son of Gabriel Hanger, 1st Baron Coleraine, by Elizabeth Bond, daughter and heiress of Richard Bond, of Hereford. He sat as Member of Parliament for East Retford between 1775 and 1778, for Aldborough between 1778 and 1780 and for St Michael's between 1780 and 1784. In 1794 he succeeded his elder brother John in the barony. This was an Irish peerage and did not entitle him to a seat in the English House of Lords (although it did entitle him to a seat in the Irish House of Lords.

Lord Coleraine died in December 1814, aged 70, and was succeeded in the title by his younger brother, George.

Parliament of Great Britain
| Preceded by Sir Cecil Wray, Bt; Lord Thomas Clinton | Member of Parliament for East Retford; 1775–1778; With: Sir Cecil Wray, Bt | Succeeded by Sir Cecil Wray, Bt; Lord John Clinton |
| Preceded by Abel Smith; William Baker | Member of Parliament for Aldborough; 1778–1780; With: William Baker | Succeeded by Sir Richard Sutton, Bt; Charles Mellish |
| Preceded by John Stephenson; Francis Hale | Member of Parliament for St Michael's; 1780–1784; With: Francis Hale | Succeeded by David Howell; Sir Christopher Hawkins, Bt |
Peerage of Ireland
| Preceded by John Hanger | Baron Coleraine; 1794–1814 | Succeeded by George Hanger |
