= John Burniston =

British politician

John Burniston was the Deputy Governor of Bombay from 1690 to 1704.

He left a widow named Carolina. One of their daughters was Sarah, wife of William Pownall and mother of Thomas Pownall, governor of Massachusetts Bay and South Carolina.
