= William Trevanion =

British Whig politician

William Trevanion (15 March 1727 – 24 January 1767) was a British Whig politician.

== Biography ==
Trevanion was the only surviving son of John Trevanion of Caerhays Castle and Anne Blake, a daughter and co-heiress of Sir Francis Black. He was educated at Eton College and Christ Church, Oxford, matriculating in 1744. In 1740 he succeeded to his father's estates.

At the 1747 British general election, Trevanion was elected as a Member of Parliament for Tregony on his family's interest and in opposition to the candidate of Frederick, Prince of Wales. Although initially classed as a government supporter, he soon joined the Prince of Wales' faction, and Trevanion was appointed a groom of the bedchamber in the Prince's household in April 1749. On the Prince's death in 1751, Trevanion rejoined Henry Pelham's Whigs and was given the office of Auditor of the Duchy of Cornwall.

By 1754, Trevanion was recorded in parliamentary analysis as a member of Edward Eliot's group. In 1762, Thomas Pelham-Holles, 1st Duke of Newcastle recommended that Trevanion should be appointed to the king's household, but no role materialised. In the summer of 1765, Charles Watson-Wentworth, 2nd Marquess of Rockingham recorded that Trevanion was an independent country gentleman of whom parliamentary managers were not certain, but by 1767 he was assessed to be a government supporter. He apparently never spoke in Parliament and died in office in 1767. With his death the Trevanion male line became extinct.

Parliament of Great Britain
Preceded by Henry Penton; George Cooke	Member of Parliament for Tregony; 1747–1767; With: Claudius Amyand (1747–1754); John Fuller (1754–1761); Abraham Hume (1761–1767)	Succeeded by Thomas Pownall; Abraham Hume
