= George Lane Parker =

British Army officer and politician

George Lane Parker (1724–1791) was a British Army officer and politician who sat in the House of Commons between 1769 and 1780.

== Early life ==
Parker was born on 6 September 1724, the second son of George Parker, 2nd Earl of Macclesfield and his first wife Mary Lane, daughter of Ralph Lane of Woodbury. He matriculated at Hertford College, Oxford on 20 January 1741 and graduated BA in 1743 and MA in 1750.

== Military career ==
Parker joined the army in the 1st Foot Guards and was lieutenant and captain in 1749 and captain and lieutenant-colonel in 1755. He became Colonel in 1762 and Major-general in 1770. From 1773 to 1782 he was Colonel of the 20th Foot. He became a Lieutenant-General in 1777 and was Colonel of the 12th Dragoons from 1782.

== Political career ==
Parker stood at Guildford in 1761 but was defeated. In the 1768 general election he stood for Yarmouth (Isle of Wight) on the Holmes-Stanley interest and was returned as Member of Parliament on petition on 19 January 1769. He was returned at Tregony as a Government candidate in the 1774 general election. He had a poor attendance record, probably because of his military duties. He voted with the Government and is not recorded as speaking in the House.

== Later life ==
Parker married Jane Lady Dormer, widow of Sir Charles Cottrell-Dormer (son of Clement Cottrell-Dormer) and daughter of Charles Adelmare Caesar in May 1782. He died on 6 September 1791.

Parliament of Great Britain
Preceded by William Strode; Jervoise Clarke	Member of Parliament for Yarmouth (Isle of Wight); 1769–1774; With: Thomas Dummer	Succeeded by Edward Meux Worsley; Jervoise Clarke Jervoise
Preceded by Thomas Pownall; Hon. John Grey	Member of Parliament for Tregony; 1774–1780; With: Alexander Leith	Succeeded by John Stephenson; John Dawes
Military offices
Preceded by Bernard Hale	Colonel of the 20th Regiment of Foot; 1773–1782	Succeeded by William Wynyard
Preceded by William Keppel	Colonel of the 12th (The Prince of Wales's); Regiment of (Light) Dragoons; 1782–1791	Succeeded by Sir James Steuart
