= Bernard Hale (British Army officer) =

British Army officer

General Bernard Hale (c. 1725 – 13 March 1798) was a British Army officer.

He was the third son of Sir Bernard Hale, Chief Baron of the Irish Exchequer, by his wife Anne Thorseby of Northampton. General John Hale, Governor of Londonderry, was his youngest brother.

He was educated at Harrow School and Peterhouse, Cambridge, matriculating in January 1743 and gaining a scholarship.

Hale became a captain and lieutenant-colonel in the 3rd Regiment of Foot Guards on 30 April 1758 and colonel in the Army on 7 October 1762. He was further promoted to major-general in 1772, lieutenant-general in 1777 and general in 1793. He also held the appointments of colonel of the 20th Regiment of Foot from 1769 to 1773, Lieutenant-Governor of Chelsea Hospital from 10 May 1773, and Lieutenant-General of the Ordnance in Ireland from 1759 to 1789.

== Marriage and child ==
In September 1750, Hale married Martha, daughter of Richard Rigby of Mistley Hall, Essex and Anne Perry. Their son Lieutenant-Colonel Francis Hale was a Member of Parliament, and later adopted the surname Rigby on succeeding his uncle Richard Rigby, MP and Master of the Rolls in Ireland, to Mistley Hall.

Military offices
Preceded by William Kingsley	Colonel of the 20th Regiment of Foot; 1769–1773	Succeeded by George Lane Parker
