= Thomas Pownall =

British colonial administrator and politician (1722–1805)

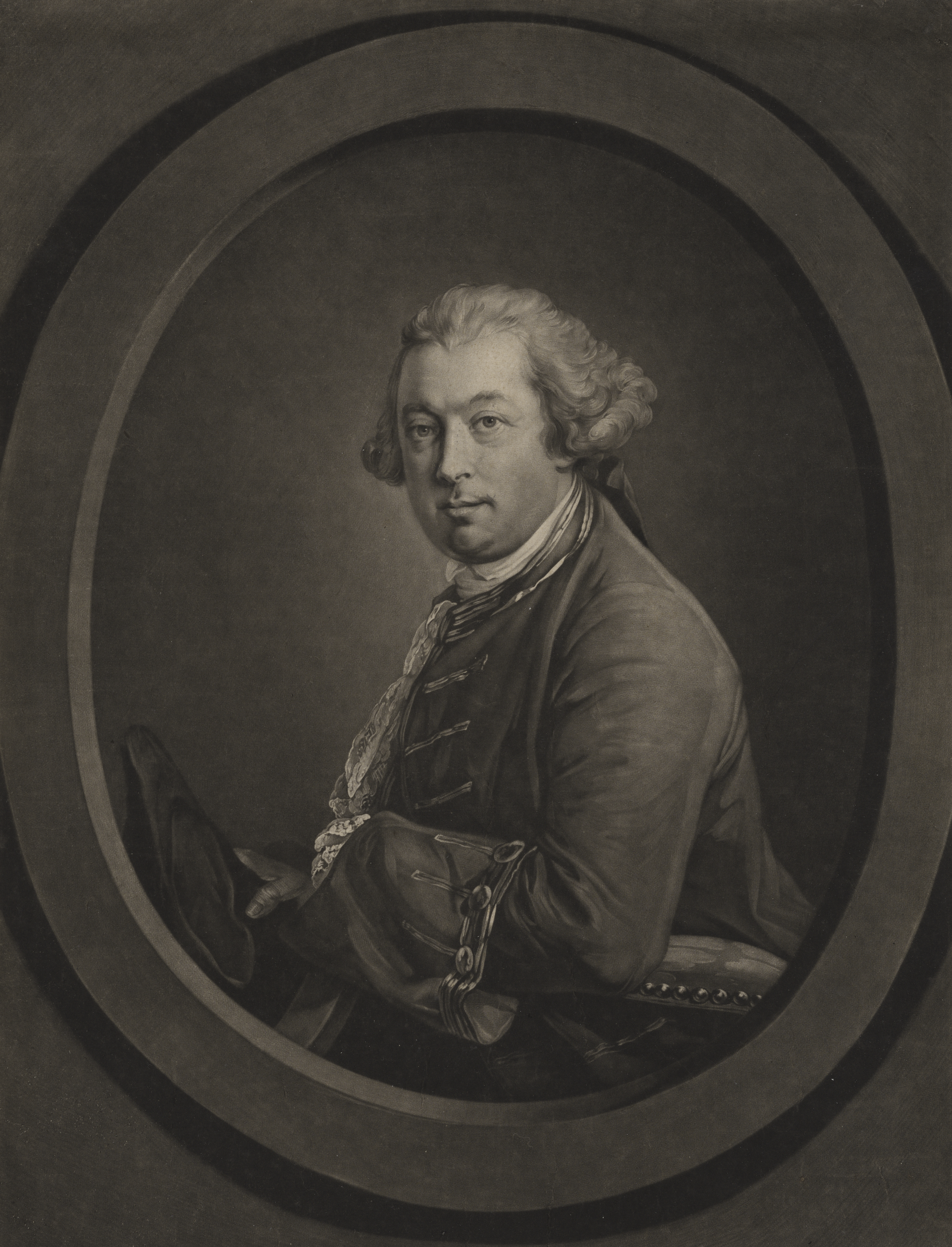
- Mezzotint by Richard Earlom after a Francis Cotes portrait, 1777

Member of the Great Britain Parliament for Minehead, Somerset
- In office 1774–1780 Serving with John Fownes-Luttrell
- Preceded by: Henry Fownes-Luttrell
- Succeeded by: Francis Fownes-Luttrell

Member of the Great Britain Parliament for Tregony, Cornwall
- In office 1767–1774 Serving with Sir Abraham Hume and John Grey
- Preceded by: William Trevanion
- Succeeded by: George Lane Parker

Governor of the Province of South Carolina
- In office 1760 – 1760, Resigned having never assumed office
- Appointed by: Lords of Trade

10th Governor of the Province of Massachusetts Bay
- In office 3 August 1757 – 3 June 1760
- Appointed by: Lords of Trade
- Preceded by: Massachusetts Governor's Council (acting)
- Succeeded by: Thomas Hutchinson (acting)

Lieutenant Governor of the Province of New Jersey
- In office 13 May 1755 – 23 September 1757
- Governor: Jonathan Belcher
- Preceded by: Office created
- Succeeded by: Office abolished

Personal details
- Died: 25 February 1805 (aged 82) Bath, Somerset, England
- Spouse: Harriet Fawkener
- Education: Trinity College, Cambridge

Thomas Pownall (bapt. 4 September 1722 N.S. – 25 February 1805) was a British colonial administrator and politician. He was governor of the Province of Massachusetts Bay from 1757 to 1760, and afterwards sat in the House of Commons from 1767 to 1780. He travelled widely in British North America prior to the American Revolutionary War, opposed Parliamentary attempts to tax the colonies, and was a minority advocate of colonial positions until the Revolution.

Classically educated and well-connected to the colonial administration in London, Pownall first travelled to North America in 1753. He spent two years exploring the American colonies before being appointed as the lieutenant governor of New Jersey in 1755. He became governor of Massachusetts in 1757 after helping engineer the recall of longtime Governor William Shirley. His administration was dominated by the French and Indian War, in which Pownall was instrumental in raising the provincial militia for the war effort. He pursued a policy of compromise regarding the quartering of regular troops in private homes, and had a generally positive relationship with the colonial assembly.

Returning to England in 1760, Pownall continued to be interested in colonial affairs, publishing widely read materials on conditions in the colonies, including several editions of The Administration of the Colonies. As a Member of Parliament he regularly advocated for colonial positions, without much success, but supported the war effort once the Revolutionary War began. In the early 19th century he became an early advocate of the reduction or removal of trade barriers, and the establishment of a solid relationship between Britain and the United States. Several writers have proposed that Pownall was Junius, a pseudonymous British writer who wrote several letters criticising government policies. John Adams wrote, "Pownall was the most constitutional and national Governor, in my opinion, who ever represented the crown in this province."

== Early life ==
Coat of Arms of Thomas Pownall

Thomas Pownall was the eldest son of William and Sarah (Burniston) Pownall, daughter of John Burniston and his wife. His father was a country gentleman and soldier whose poor health and early death in 1735 caused the family to fall upon hard times. Baptised 4 September 1722 (New Style) in Lincoln, England, Thomas was educated at Lincoln Grammar School and at Trinity College, Cambridge, where he graduated in 1743. His education exposed him to classic and current philosophers, and the sciences. His first publication, a treatise on the origins of government published in 1752, began as notes developed at Cambridge.

== Early career ==
During Thomas's years at Cambridge, his younger brother John acquired a job at the Board of Trade, which oversaw British colonial affairs, and rapidly rose in the bureaucracy. The brothers were influential supporters of each other in their efforts to advance. John secured a job for Thomas in the colonial office, where he became aware of the possibilities for advancement and influence in colonial postings. In 1753 he went to America as private secretary to Sir Danvers Osborn, just appointed governor of New York. Osborn committed suicide several days after reaching New York, leaving Pownall without a job and a sponsor. Pownall chose to remain in America, devoting himself to studying the condition of the American colonies. In the following months he travelled widely, from Maryland to Massachusetts. He was introduced into the highest circles of leadership and society in the colonies, and established relationships with a number of influential people, including Benjamin Franklin and Massachusetts Governor William Shirley.

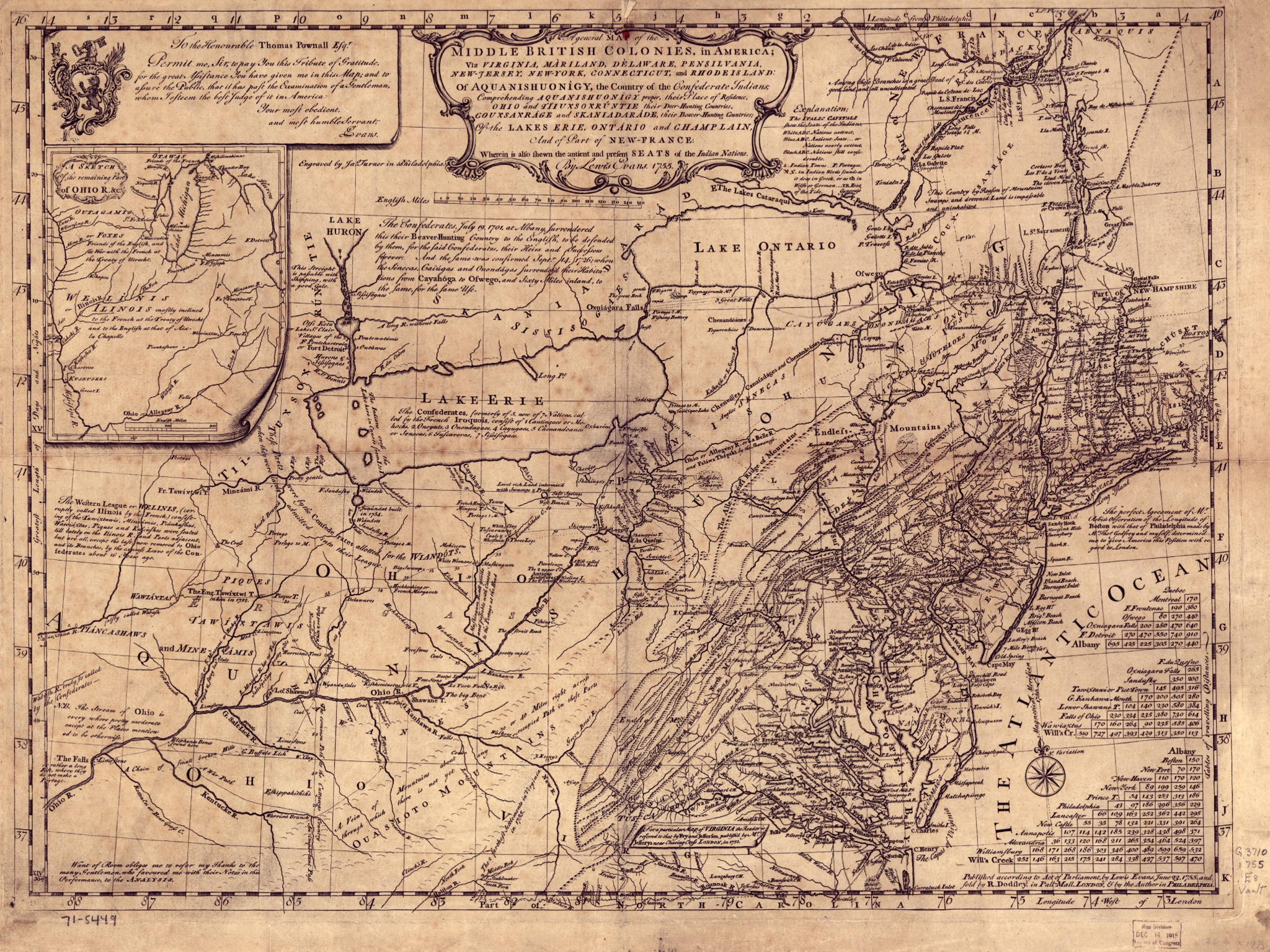
The Evans-Pownall map of 1755

Governor Osborn had been instructed particularly to deal with the rising discontent among the six Iroquois nations whose territory abutted New York (and is encompassed by central and western Upstate New York and part of Pennsylvania). Pownall had studied the matter, and he was consequently invited by his Pennsylvania connections to attend the 1754 Albany Congress as an observer. His observations on the nature of colonial dealings with the Indians (including political infighting for control of the Indian trade, and the corrupt and fraudulent acquisition of Indian lands) led him to draft a number of proposals related to colonial administration. He proposed the establishment of a crown-appointed superintendent of Indian affairs, specifically William Johnson, New York's commissioner for Indian affairs who was highly influential with the Iroquois nations. He also articulated visions for managing the expansion of the colonies to the west.

After the conference Pownall returned to Philadelphia. In this time he apparently deepened a close friendship with Franklin, with whom he began to invest in business ventures. Franklin, who had unsuccessfully proposed colonial union at the Albany conference, may have contributed to Pownall's writings, although the exact nature of his influence is unclear. While in Philadelphia Pownall also established a close collaboration with cartographer Lewis Evans, both of whom recognized the need for accurate maps of the inland regions of North America then being disputed with New France in the French and Indian War. The map Evans published in 1755 was dedicated to Pownall, and brought the latter wide publicity. Pownall's recommendation of William Johnson as superintendent of Indian affairs was implemented by the crown in 1755.

== Lieutenant Governor of New Jersey ==
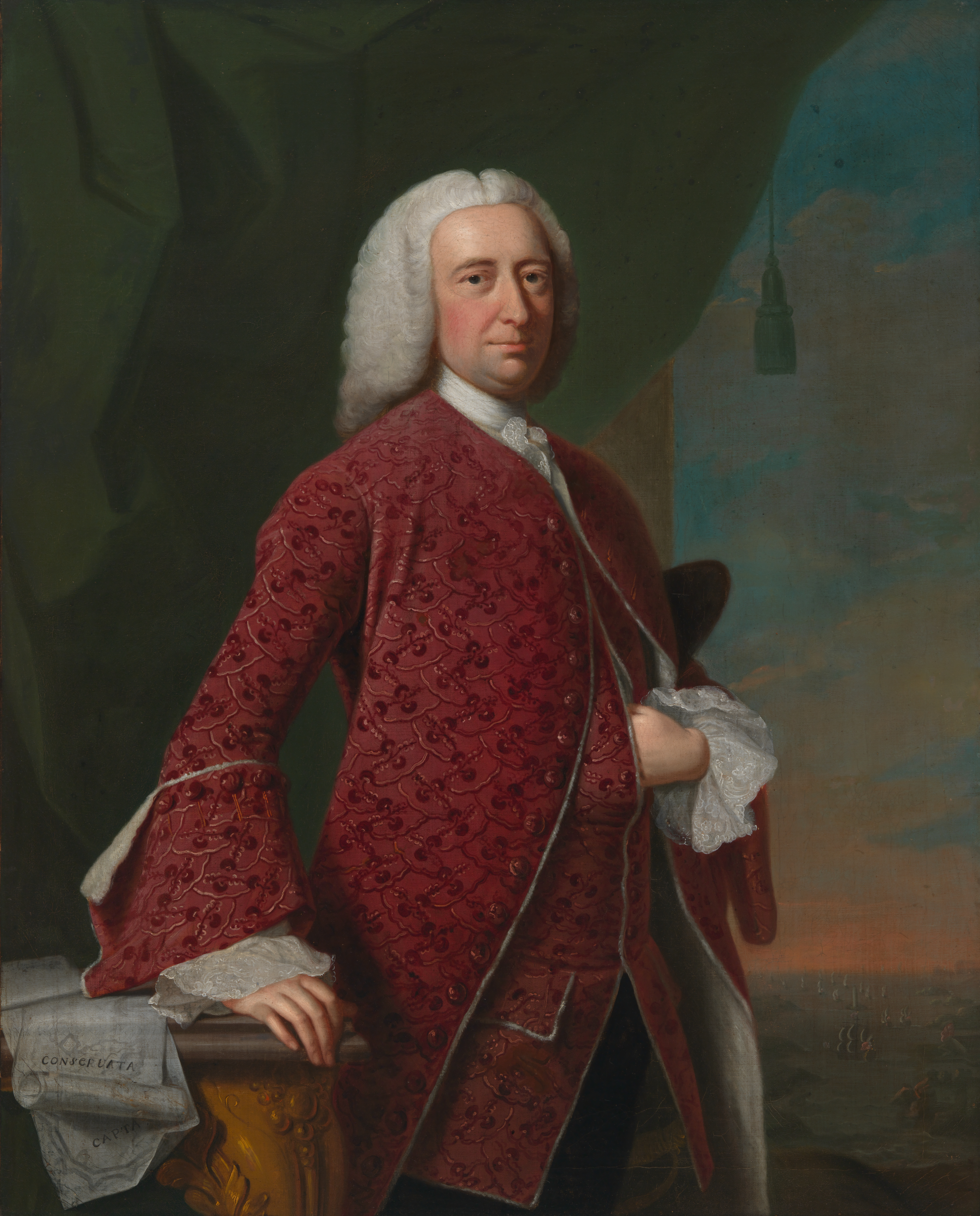
Portrait of William Shirley by Thomas Hudson, 1750. William Shirley was unseated as Massachusetts governor in part by Pownall's actions.

Pownall had been living at his own expense, in the hopes that a posting would eventually come his way. In May 1755 he was appointed Lieutenant Governor of New Jersey, with little responsibility beyond anticipating the death of the aging governor, Jonathan Belcher, and attending military conferences concerning the ongoing war. Belcher, however, proved to be longer lived than expected (he died in 1757), and Pownall was restless. The military conferences drew him into an ongoing power struggle between Johnson and Shirley (who rose to become military commander-in-chief upon the death of General Edward Braddock in July 1755) over the management of Indian affairs. Johnson capitalized on Pownall's concern over frontier security to draw him into his camp. Pownall already harboured some dislike of Shirley over an earlier snub, and his reports to New York Governor Sir Charles Hardy, combined with damaging allegations provided by other Johnson supporters, led to Shirley's dismissal as commander-in-chief. Pownall returned to England in early 1756, where he confirmed the Johnson allegations, and was rewarded with a post as "Secretary Extraordinary" (a title of Pownall's creation) to the new commander-in-chief, Lord Loudoun.

While Pownall was in England, Shirley's reputation was further damaged by allegations (not apparently furthered by Pownall's action) that he had let military information fall into enemy hands, and the Board of Trade decided to recall him. Pownall was also offered the governorship of Pennsylvania by its proprietors; however, his demands for wide-ranging powers in the post led them to retract the offer. Pownall turned this to his own advantage, widely publicizing the fact that he had turned down the offer because of the "unreasonable, unenlightened attitude of the proprietors."

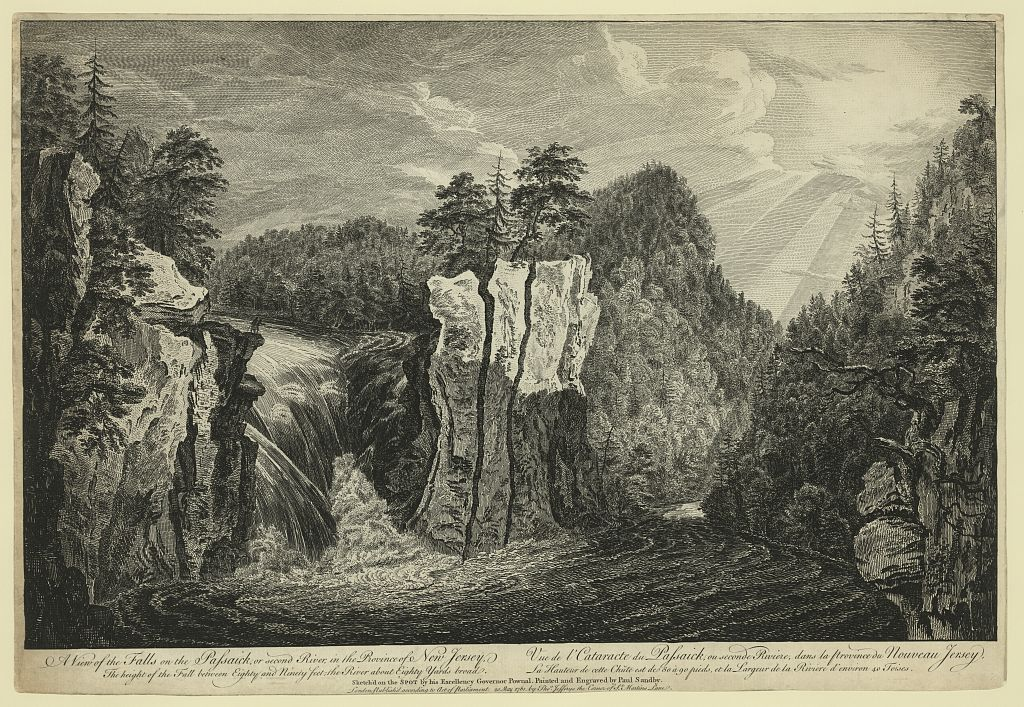
Pownall's drawing of the Passaic River's Great Falls

He accompanied Lord Loudoun back to America in July 1756, but again returned to England to represent Loudoun in hearings on Shirley's military leadership. Lord Loudoun also instructed Pownall on his military plans and objectives. In London he became closely involved in informing members of the new Pitt-Newcastle Ministry of the state of affairs in North America.

His performance in these matters resulted in his appointment as governor of Massachusetts in March 1757. Although he was admired for his competence in colonial affairs, he was also criticised for his vanity and temper, as well as his role in bringing about Shirley's fall.

== Governor of Massachusetts Bay ==
Pownall arrived in Boston in early August 1757. He was well received and assumed his duties on 3 August. He was immediately thrust into a war-related crisis. A French force was reported to be moving toward Fort William Henry, in northern New York, and the military commander there had made an urgent call for militia. Pownall was energetic in organizing the militia, but the call to arms came too late, since Fort William Henry fell after a brief siege that was followed by some of the worst atrocities by Indians of the war. Loudoun was upset that the Massachusetts General Court had not fully implemented a variety of demands that he had made, and he held Pownall responsible. Pownall objected to the interference of the military in civilian affairs, the threat of which Loudoun used to implement his agenda, by maintaining that it was necessary for the governor to lead, not drive, the provincial assembly. The meeting was acrimonious, and Loudoun afterward wrote a letter to London that harshly criticised Pownall's position and called his ideas on governance "high-handed".

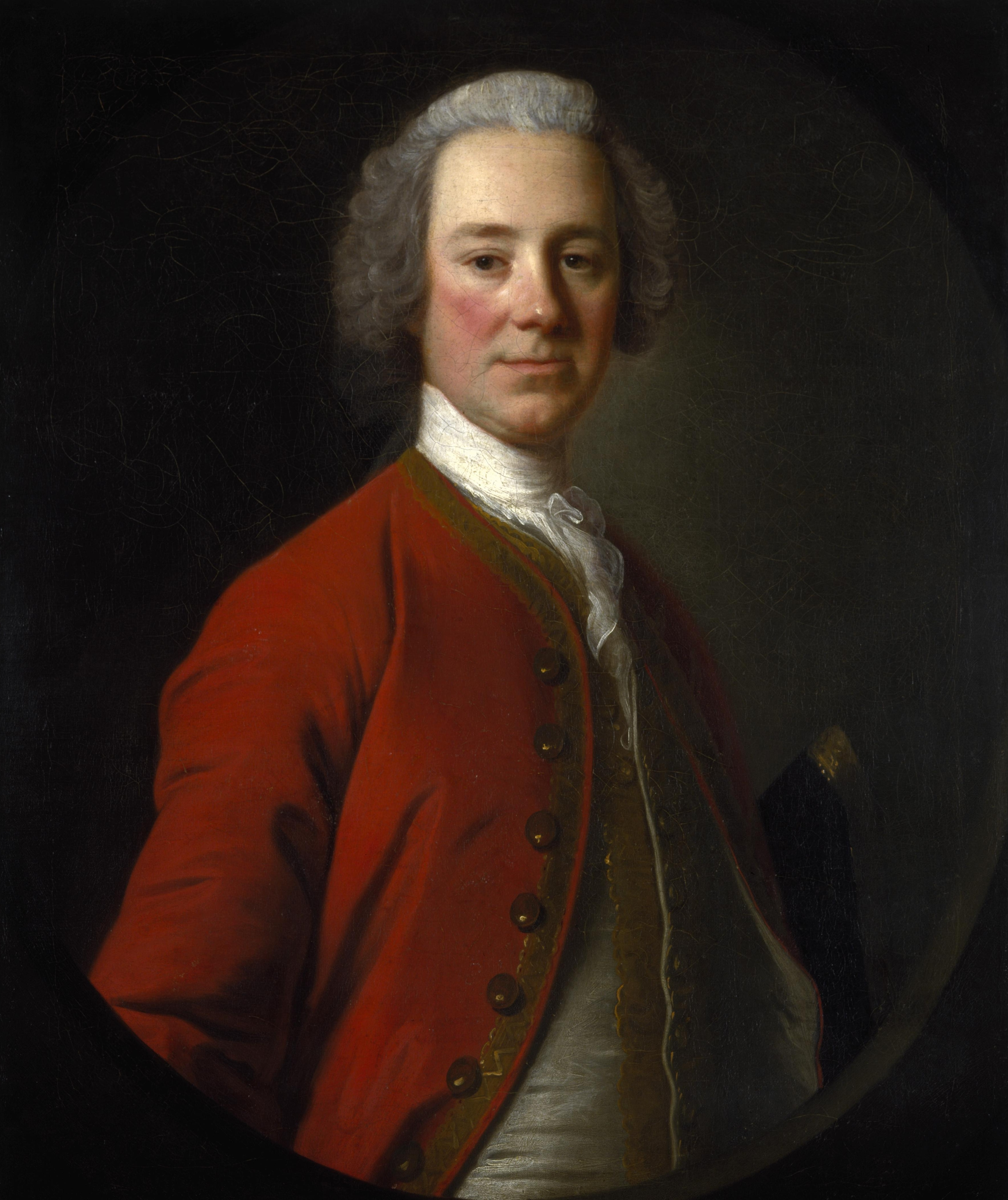
Pownall had a sometimes-contentious relationship with John Campbell, 4th Earl of Loudoun.

In September 1757 Pownall travelled to New Jersey to attend the funeral of Governor Jonathan Belcher and stopped in New York to meet with Lord Loudoun. Loudoun demanded that Massachusetts authorities billet his troops in civilian homes in Boston, which was opposed by the General Court. In response, Loudoun threatened to order additional troops into the colony and acquire housing by force. Pownall requested for the General Court to accede in some way to Loudoun's demands and eventually signed a bill authorizing the quartering of troops in inns and other public spaces. The bill was unpopular, and Pownall was negatively cast in the local press as supportive of Loudoun. Pownall's exchanges with Loudoun, however, show that he was keenly aware of the colonists' position: "the inhabitants of this province are intitled to the natural rights of English born subjects... the enjoyment of these rights... will animate and encourage them to resist... a cruel, invading enemy." He was equally clear on the relationship between the governor and assembly: "a governor must endeavour to lead those people for he cannot drive them and must lead them step by step as he can gett footing". Pownall was so committed to his ideas that he offered to resign, but Loudoun encouraged him to remain in the post; Pownall would later author portions of the 1765 Quartering Act, a parliamentary bill whose implementation was widely resisted in the colonies.

In January 1758, Pownall wrote several letters to William Pitt the Elder to outline the difficult issues surrounding relations between the colonial government and the military and civil administrations of the British establishment. He specifically recommended for London to offer to pay more of the colonial expenses of the war; the implementation of that idea led to a significant increase in militia recruitment for the remaining years of the war, including 7,000 men from Massachusetts for the 1758 campaign. Pownall was able to move a bill through the General Court to implement reforms of the militia system. The bill did not include all of the changes that Pownall had sought to achieve a more flexible and less costly organization, and its terms also handed more power over the militia in the hands of local officials and reduced the governor's control.

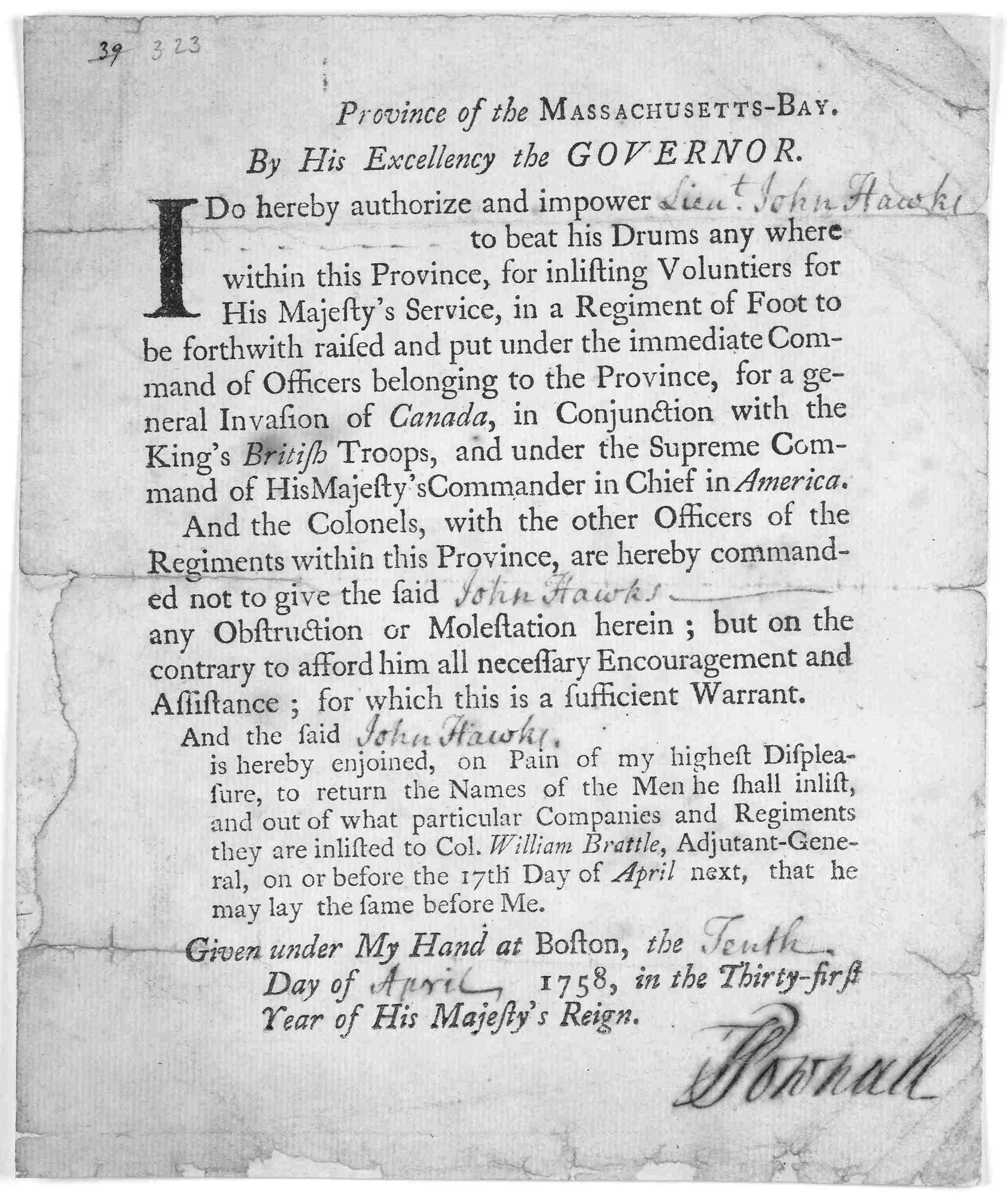
Order by Pownall authorizing Lieutenant Colonel John Hawke to beat his drum for enlistments for regiment for the invasion of Canada, 1758

Despite the reforms, recruiting for the militia proved difficult, and recruiting parties were often harassed and stoned, which led to rioting on several occasions. Pownall was, however, successful in recruiting the province's full quota of militia, and his energetic assistance in the war effort earned him approbation from Pitt; the Board of Trade; and the new commander-in-chief, James Abercrombie. Flush with success, Pownall proposed to General Jeffery Amherst the idea of establishing a fort on Penobscot Bay to contest potential French movements in the area. The area had been the site of periodic frontier raids since 1755, including a major attack on St. George in spring 1758. The idea developed into a major expedition to the area, which received not only Amherst's approval but also the assembly's. Pownall led the expedition, oversaw the construction of Fort Pownall and counted it as a major success of the year. Its success kicked off a minor land rush in the area.

Although Pownall's start in power was somewhat rocky, his popularity in the province grew as his term progressed. He assiduously saw to the needs of its many fishermen, successfully convinced the military authorities to eliminate burdensome red tape and courted local merchants. He invested in ventures managed by Thomas and John Hancock and was lauded by a group of Massachusetts merchants upon his departure. A bachelor, he was reported to be a ladies' man who was highly engaged in the social scene. Although he was not strongly religious, he regularly attended Anglican services but was also a frequent visitor to local Congregational services. He successfully finessed contentious issues surrounding the recruitment, deployment, and provisioning of militia by negotiating compromises between military and provincial demands. He, however, had a strained relationship with his lieutenant governor, Thomas Hutchinson. The two men never trusted each other, and Pownall regularly excluded Hutchinson from his inner council meetings but instead sent him on missions such as to deal with militia recruitment issues. One of Pownall's last acts before leaving the colony was to approve the appointment of James Otis Sr., a longtime Hutchinson adversary, as speaker of the assembly.

In the later months of 1759, Pownall wrote a letter to Pitt to request leave to return to England because "I might be of some service" there. The biographer John Schutz speculates that the underlying reason for Pownall's request was related to frustration with his exclusion from the major military actions of the later war years, which was possibly compounded by his desire to acquire a more significant post, such as a governor-generalship of the conquered New France. The historian Bernard Bailyn is of the opinion that Pownall's divisive dislike and distrust of Shirley supporters like Thomas Hutchinson and ensuing local political infighting contributed to the request, as did his difficult relationships with the military commanders.

Whatever the reason, the Board of Trade engaged in a reshuffling of colonial positions after King George II died, and Pownall was given the governorship of South Carolina and permission first to take leave in England. His departure from Boston was delayed by militia-recruiting issues and the need to deal with the aftermath of a major fire in the city, and he did not leave until June 1760.

== The Administration of the Colonies ==
Although he held the governorship of South Carolina, he never actually went there. He characterised his term in Massachusetts as "arduous" and informed the colonial office in November 1760 that he would accept another governorship only if the recently acceded king George III directly ordered it. Pitt appointed him to the military commissary's office in the Electorate of Hanover, where he served until the Seven Years' War ended in 1763. The position did not further his career ambitions in colonial administration, however, and led to allegations of financial irregularities of which he was cleared.

Upon his return to England he prepared for publication a treatise entitled The Administration of the Colonies. First published anonymously in 1764, Pownall revised the work and republished the work several times between 1765 and 1777. The work, a dry and complex treatise on the situation in North America that included commentary on the burgeoning tensions in the Thirteen Colonies, was intended by Pownall to explore how the colonies could properly be incorporated into a larger empire.

Pownall's work identified him as supportive of American liberty. Although he feared that Britain was losing control of its colonies, he wrote that the Americans were entitled to the same rights of representative government as their fellow subjects in England, Scotland and Wales. At the same time, he insisted that the military protection that the colonists received from Britain created equally extensive obligations to help pay for some of the cost. He was also convinced of the need for a strong central legislature capable of making common policies that would be binding for every member of the British Empire, including the fractious provinces in North America. Pownall eventually decided that the only solution lay in creating an imperial parliament with representatives from both Britain and the colonies. Although he was not the only British commentator to embrace the idea of an imperial parliament, most Americans found it anathema, so much so that the pamphleteers James Otis Jr. and John Dickinson singled out his centralized plan of legislative reform for particular criticism in Dickinson's influential Letters from a Farmer in Pennsylvania (1768). and Otis's Rights of the British Colonies.

== Colonial supporter ==
Pownall continued to communicate with political allies in Massachusetts and was on several occasions called to appear before parliamentary committees to comment on colonial affairs. He considered returning to Massachusetts if a post could be found, and he began investing in property in Nova Scotia by extending his colonial property interests beyond those he had been granted in Maine during his governorship. In 1765, he married Harriet Fawkener, widow of Everard Fawkener and daughter to Lieutenant General Charles Churchill. That gave him a connection to the aristocratic Dukes of Marlborough. Pownall raised her four children as his own.

A gracious and intelligent woman, she became a partner in advancing his political career, hosting social events and encouraging his intellectual pursuits. She may have encouraged him to stand for Parliament in 1767, when he won a seat representing Tregony.

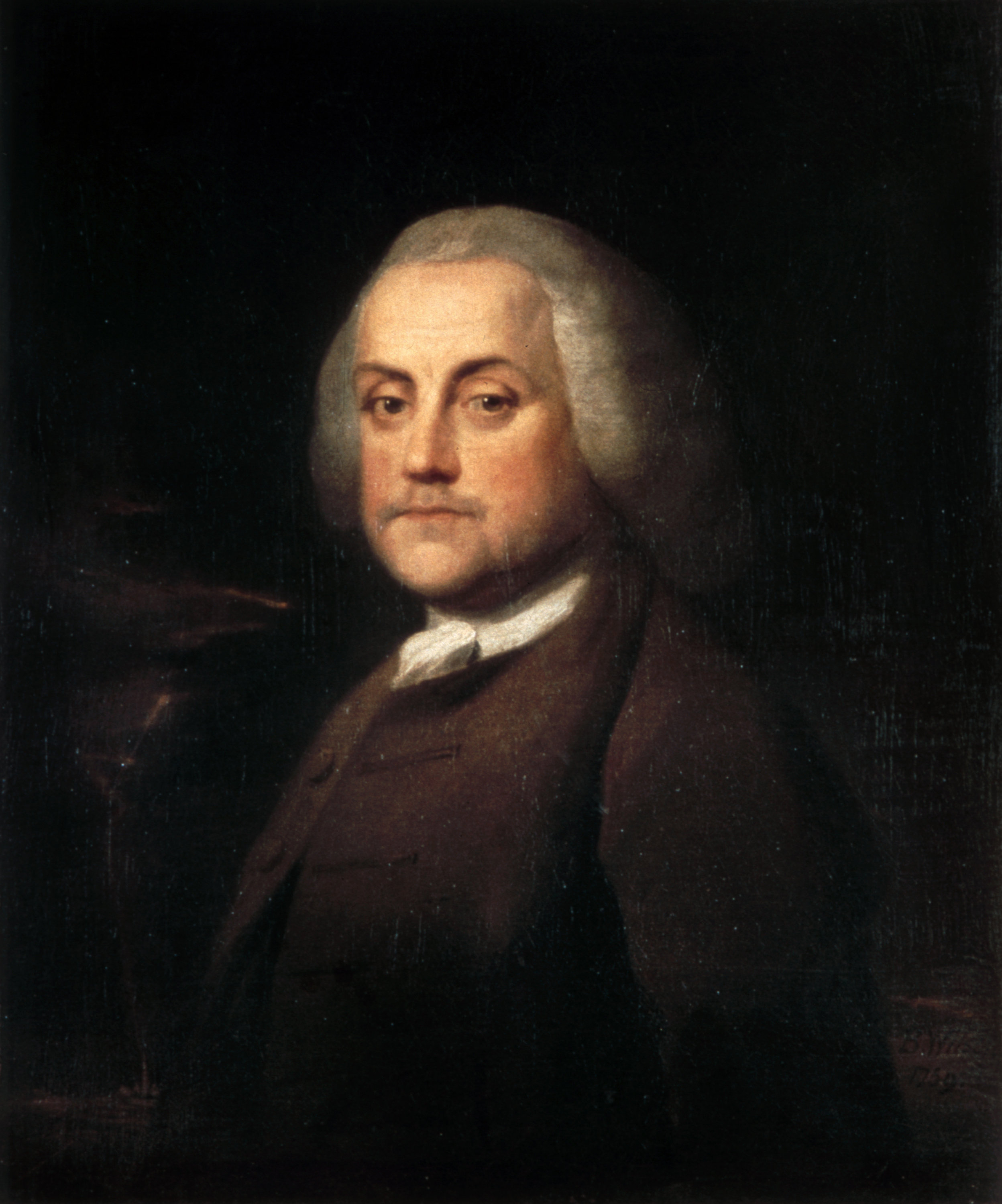
Benjamin Franklin was a friend and frequent correspondent of Pownall.

He renewed correspondence with officials in Massachusetts in the hopes of winning appointment as an agent representing the province's interests but was unsuccessful. He regularly received visitors from the colonies, and Benjamin Franklin, his old friend from Pennsylvania, was a frequent guest. He observed with alarm the rise in tension in the colonies and the missteps of parliamentary leadership and colonial administration that exacerbated, rather than reduced, them. He used his position in Parliament to highlight the colonial objections to the Quartering Act of 1765 and other unpopular legislation. When British troops were sent to Boston in 1768 after protests there against the Townshend Acts had turned violent, he took to the floor of Parliament to warn that the connections between Britain and the colonies were unraveling and that the end result could be a permanent breach.

Pownall was opposed to Lord North's partial repeal in 1770 of the hated Townshend Acts in which the tax on tea was retained as a symbol of parliamentary power. In debate on the act, Pownall pointed out that retention of the tax would be a "millstone" around English necks, rather than a yoke on American ones, and that it would lead to civil war. His speech was delivered on 5 March 1770, the day of the Boston Massacre. Dispirited by his view that Parliament failed to understand the American colonial issues, he urged his colonial correspondents to continue to press constitutional issues and to avoid violence.

Colonial American issues then briefly subsided from the stage. In 1772, Pownall introduced legislation reforming food production and distribution in Great Britain. It passed the House of Commons but was amended by the Lords, which led the Commons to reject the amended bill as a violation of its prerogatives. The bill passed the next year and was called "Governor Pownall's Bill". It received much praise, including some from influential figures such as Adam Smith. Pownall was also honoured with membership in the Society of Antiquaries and the Royal Society.

== Revolution ==
Following the Boston Tea Party in December 1773, Parliament passed a series of bills designed to punish Massachusetts. Pownall was unable to sway opinion toward more conciliatory measures. He was also implicated in the Hutchinson letters affair as someone who may have delivered private letters of Thomas Hutchinson to Benjamin Franklin, but Franklin never identified his source for the letters. Pownall was unable to retain his seat since in 1774, he was voted out of office. Seeking to remain active, Pownall ended up appealing to Lord North, who secured a seat for him in a by-election, representing Minehead. The apparent turn towards Toryism alarmed a number of Pownall's colonial supporters; there is also some evidence that North may have engineered Pownall's defeat to gain his support.

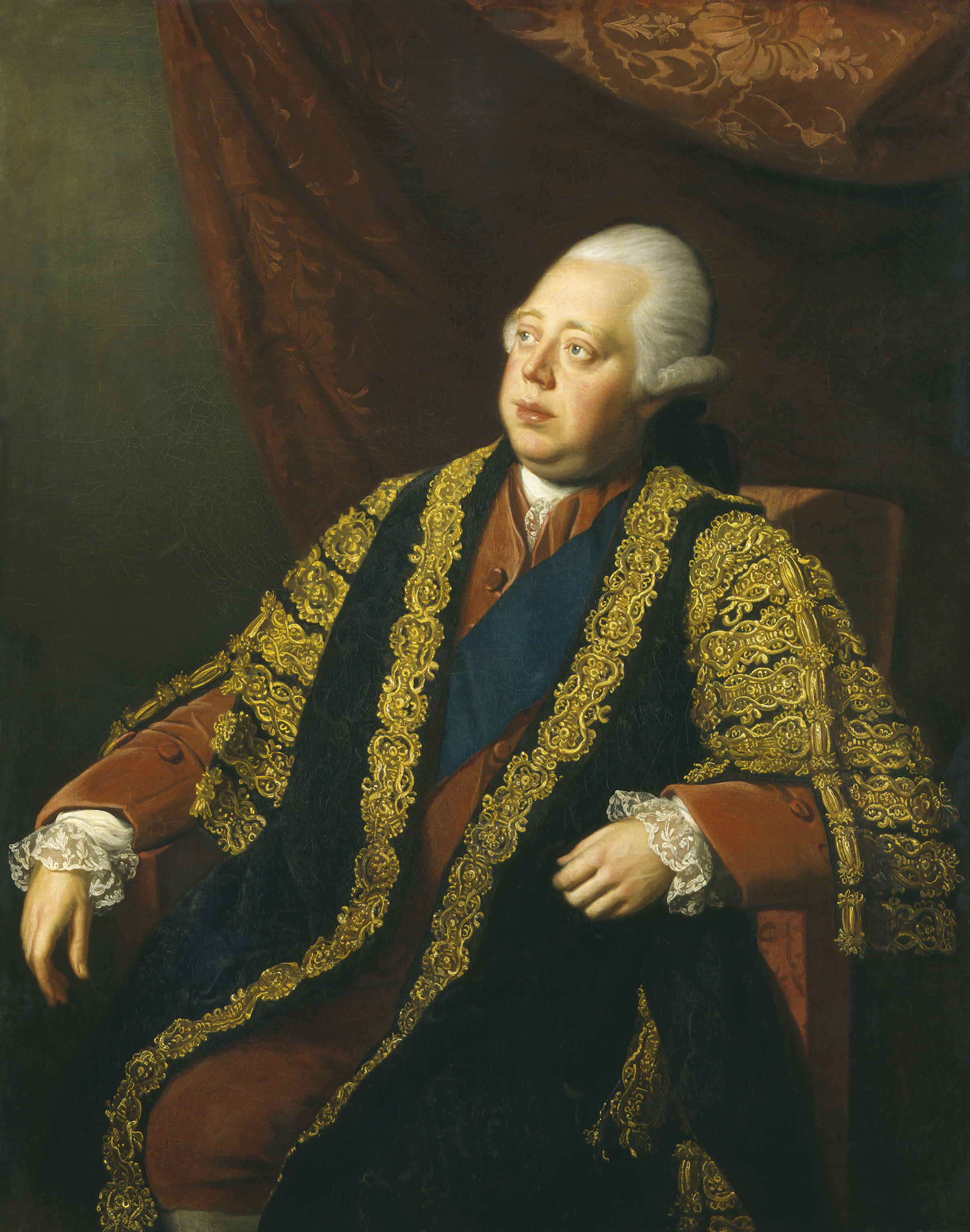
Lord North, portrait by Nathaniel Dance

Pownall supported North's attempts at reconciliation in debates leading to the start the American Revolutionary War. However, once hostilities had begun in April 1775, his conciliatory views were dismissed by war-supporting Tories, who opposed them, as well as by Whigs, who saw his proposals as attempts to undercut their positions. Pownall remained nominally in support of North until 1777, when he openly made declarations in support of the peace party. The entry of France to the war on the American side returned him firmly to the pro-war Tory position. His support was, however, nuanced since he continued to argue for some sort of conciliation with the Americans and remaining resolutely patriotic with respect to the French. He was not alone among British politicians in being unable reconcile those positions and refused to stand for re-election in 1780.

During the war years, he published several revisions to The Administration of the Colonies, updating and expanding the work to reflect changing conditions. He also worked to update and revise the Evans map by soliciting data and updated maps from colonial correspondents. He withdrew to some extent in the later years after the death of his wife in 1777 but continued to appear in Parliament.

== Later life ==
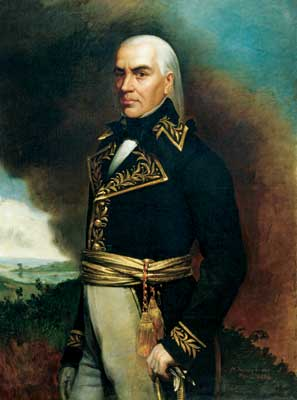
Francisco de Miranda, activist for Latin American independence (portrait by Martín Tovar y Tovar)

In July 1780, Pownall anonymously published an essay titled A Memorial Most Humbly Addressed to the Sovereigns of Europe. The widely published document gained Pownall attention throughout Europe; the anonymity of its author was compromised by the use of extended passages from Administration of the Colonies. The essay propounded instructions to Europe's leaders on how to deal with a newly independent United States by pointing out that America's independence and rapid population growth would have a transformative effect on world trade. He proposed that European leaders meet to establish worldwide regulations for what was essentially free trade.

Pownall continued to maintain an interest in the United States after the war ended although he never returned. He sought without success a commission in the Massachusetts militia, mostly as a formality so that he could present it during his European travels. He continued to write essays (new ones and revisions to older ones) and published an updated version of his 1755 map. In his later years, Pownall was introduced to Francisco de Miranda, a Venezuelan colonial general who favoured Latin American independence from Spain. According to the historian William Spence Robertson, significant arguments advanced by Miranda in his later efforts are traceable to Pownall's influence. Pownall also assisted Miranda explicitly by cultivating connections in the British government as he attempted to advance the independence agenda. Pownall's last major work was a treatise again arguing for free trade and explicitly called for British support of Latin American independence as a way to open those markets to British and American trade. Pownall died at Bath on 25 February 1805 and was interred in the church at Walcot.

== Antiquary ==
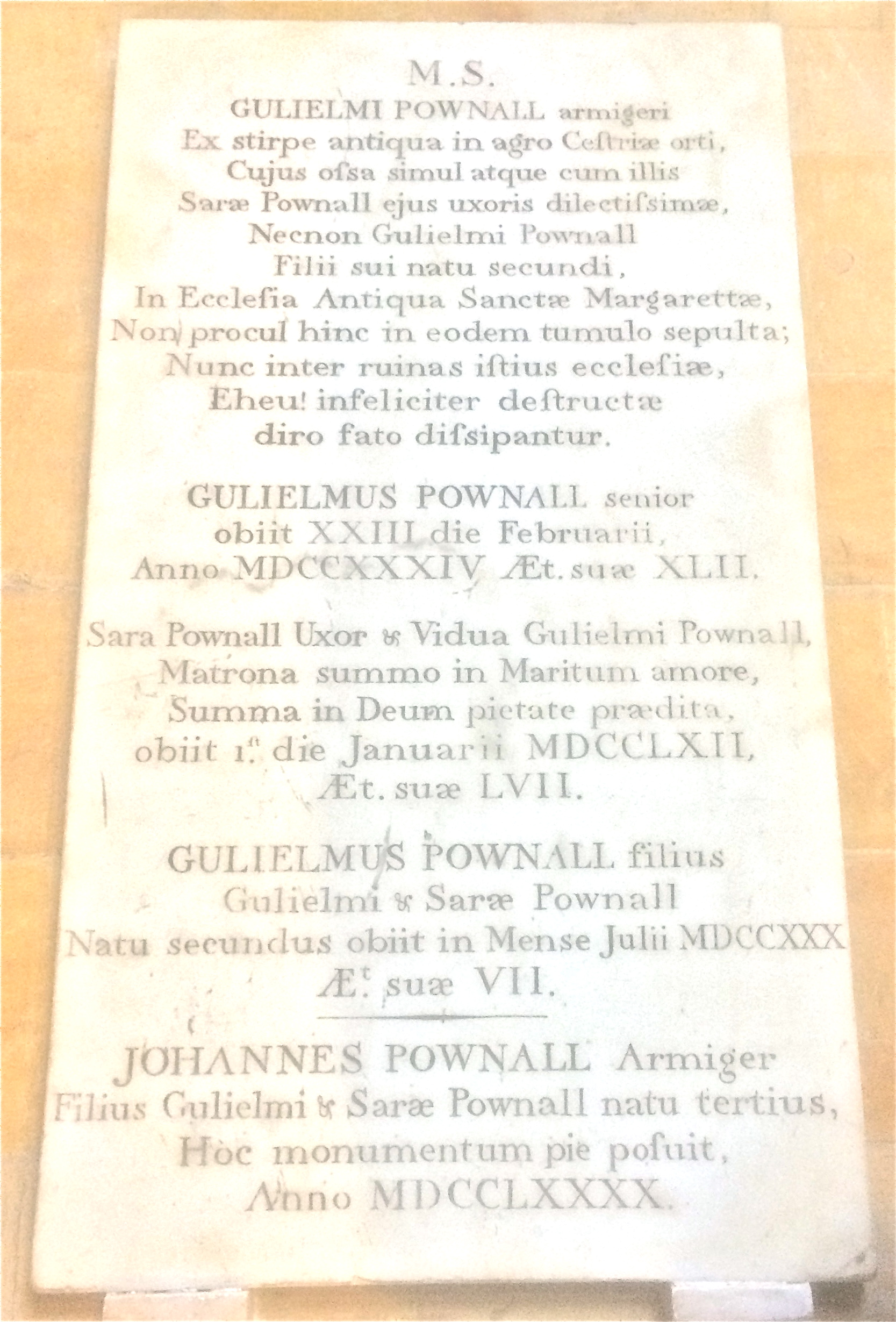
Monument to William and Sarah Pownall in Lincoln Cathedral, erected by Thomas's brother John in 1790.

While Thomas Pownall is well known as an American colonial governor and an English politician, he was also an important figure in the late-18th-century antiquarian and archaeological studies. In her study of Pownall, Bryony Orme remarks that he "is perhaps one of the most neglected of our early antiquaries, and undeservedly so." He inherited these interests from his father Captain William Pownall, who lived at No. 5 Pottergate in the Minster Yard, which surrounds Lincoln Cathedral. His father had corresponded with William Stukeley about ancient finds in and around Lincoln, and Thomas Pownall's brother John was also a writer on archaeological subjects. Pownall was already demonstrating his interest in archaeology before he left for America, when, in 1752, he recorded evidence for a Roman villa at Glentworth in Lincolnshire

After his return from America, he became a Fellow of the Society of Antiquaries in 1770, and he contributed extensively to early issues of the journal Archaeologia. Some of his writings describe discoveries around Lincoln. But more importantly he wrote more widely on New Grange in Ireland in 1773 and Braich-y-Dinas at Penmaenmawr, on the North Wales coast. He was to follow this with descriptions of Roman remains in France when he was living there, and, on moving to Bath he again provided descriptions of Roman discoveries.

== Family and legacy ==
Pownall married twice. His first wife was Harriet Churchill, widow of Sir Everard Fawkener and illegitimate daughter of Lieutenant General Charles Churchill. In 1784 Pownall married Hannah (Kennet) Astell, acquiring in the process significant estates and the trappings of landed gentry.

The towns of Pownal, Maine and Pownal, Vermont are named after Thomas Pownall. Dresden, Maine was once named Pownalborough in his honour; this recognition survives in the Pownalborough Courthouse, an historic property built there in 1761. The remains of Fort Pownall, named for him, survive in Maine's Fort Point State Park.

== Junius ==
Between 1769 and 1772, a series of letters was published in London's Public Advertiser, written by someone using the pseudonym Junius. Many of the letters contained accusations of corruption and abuse of power on the part of British government officials, subjects Pownall also spoke and wrote about. The identity of Junius has since been the subject of contemporary and historical debate. In 1854 Frederick Griffin wrote Junius Uncovered, in which he advanced the argument that Pownall was Junius; this argument was again raised by Pownall descendant Charles A. W. Pownall in his 1908 biography of Pownall. Modern scholars dispute the notion, currently favouring Philip Francis as the writer of the letters based on several lines of evidence.

== Notes ==
Political offices
| Preceded by Massachusetts Governor's Council (acting) | Governor of the Province of Massachusetts Bay; 3 August 1757 – 3 June 1760 | Succeeded by Thomas Hutchinson (acting) |
Parliament of Great Britain
| Preceded by William Trevanion; Abraham Hume | Member of Parliament for Tregony; 1767–1774; With: Abraham Hume 1767–68; John Grey 1768–74 | Succeeded by George Lane Parker; Alexander Leith |
| Preceded by Henry Fownes Luttrell; John Fownes Luttrell | Member of Parliament for Minehead; 1774–1780; With: John Fownes Luttrell | Succeeded by Francis Fownes Luttrell; John Fownes Luttrell |
