= John Grey (MP for Bridgnorth) =

British politician

John Grey (c. 1724 – 25 February 1777) was a British politician, the younger son of Harry Grey, 3rd Earl of Stamford. He was the Clerk of the Green Cloth from 1754 until his death, and at the 1754 general election he was elected unopposed as one of the two Members of Parliament (MPs) for Bridgnorth in Shropshire. He was re-elected unopposed in 1761, and stood down in 1768 to be elected at Tregony instead.

In May 1748, he married Lucy, daughter of Sir Joseph Danvers, 1st Baronet. They had no children.

Parliament of Great Britain
Preceded by Thomas Whitmore; Arthur Weaver	Member of Parliament for Bridgnorth; 1754–1768; With: George Pigot	Succeeded by George Pigot; William Whitmore
Preceded by Abraham Hume; Thomas Pownall	Member of Parliament for Tregony; 1768–1774; With: Thomas Pownall	Succeeded by Hon. George Lane Parker; Alexander Leith
