= Leith (surname) =

Family name

Leith is a surname of Scottish origin. Notable people with the surname include:

- Belinda Leith, British singer
- Bob Leith, drummer in Cardiacs
- Charles Kenneth Leith (1875–1956), American geologist
- Damien Leith (born 1976), Irish-born Australian singer/songwriter
- Emmett Leith (1927–2005), American scientist and electrical engineer
- Gordon Leith (1885–1965), South African architect
- Hilary Leith (born 1983), Canadian rugby union player
- Jack Leith (1872–1935), Australian rules footballer
- James Leith (VC) (1826–1869), British soldier, recipient of the Victoria Cross
- John H. Leith (1919–2002), American theologian
- Julie Leith (born 1978) poet, interpretive dancer
- Leith Baronets
- Leith-Buchanan Baronets
- Linda Leith, Montreal-based writer, translator, and publisher
- Lloyd Leith (1902–1974), American basketball referee and coach
- Oliver Leith (born 1990), British composer
- Prue Leith (born 1940), South African-born restaurateuse, TV broadcaster and cookery writer
- Remington Leith (born 1994), singer in Palaye Royale
- Robert Leith (1885–1933), British wireless operator, aboard the last voyage of RMS Lusitania
- Rosemary Leith (born 1961), Canadian-born director of organizations
- Sam Leith (born 1974), English author and journalist
- Tom Leith, American football and basketball coach
- Valery Leith, pseudonym of Tricia Sullivan (born 1968), American writer
- Virginia Leith (1932–2019), American actress, starred in The Brain That Wouldn't Die
- Baron Leith of Fyvie (1847–1925), British peerage title

== See also ==
- Charles Forbes-Leith, British Army officer and politician
- Robert Leith-Macgregor, British Army officer and RAF pilot
- Sylvia Leith-Ross, English anthropologist and writer
