= Boyd baronets of Danson (1775) =

Escutcheon of the Boyd baronets of Danson

The Boyd baronetcy, of Danson in the County of Kent, was created in the Baronetage of Great Britain on 2 June 1775 for John Boyd. He was a sugar merchant and vice-chairman of the British East India Company; he was also a plantation owner on St Kitts, and built the mansion of Danson Hill near Bexleyheath.

He was succeeded by his son, the 2nd Baronet. He represented Wareham in the House of Commons from 1780 to 1784. In 1807 he had the Danson Hill estate sold. The title descended from father to son until the death of his great-grandson, the 5th Baronet, in 1857. The 6th Baronet, a cleric, was his uncle; on his death in 1889 the baronetcy became extinct.

== Boyd baronets, of Danson (1775) ==
- Sir John Boyd, 1st Baronet (1718–1800)
- Sir John Boyd, 2nd Baronet (1750–1815)
- Sir John Boyd, 3rd Baronet (1786–1855)
- Sir John Augustus Hugh Boyd, 4th Baronet (1819–1857)
- Sir Harley Hugh Boyd, 5th Baronet (1853–1876)
- Sir Frederick Boyd, 6th Baronet (1820–1889)

== Notes ==
Baronetage of Great Britain
Preceded by Warren baronets	Boyd baronets of Danson; 2 June 1775	Succeeded by Leith baronets
