= Sir Abraham Hume, 1st Baronet =

British businessman and politician (1703–1772)

Sir Abraham Hume, 1st Baronet (1703 – 10 October 1772) was a British businessman and MP.

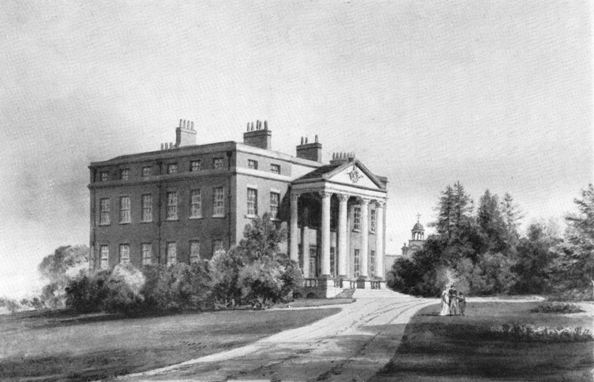
Wormleybury House

He was the fourth son of Robert Home (subsequently Hume) of Ayton, Berwick.

Hume was a Principal Managing Owner for groups which built ships and hired them to the East India Company. He was elected Member of Parliament for Steyning in 1747–54, and Tregony in 1761–68, both rotten boroughs.

After inheriting the Wormleybury estate from his brother Alexander in 1765 he rebuilt the house his brother had commissioned in 1734. He was given a baronet on 4 April 1769.

He was the father of 2 sons and a daughter by his wife Hannah, sixth daughter of Sir Thomas Frederick and was succeeded by his eldest son Sir Abraham Hume, 2nd Baronet. Their daughter Hannah married the wit James Hare.

Parliament of the United Kingdom
Preceded by Charles Eversfield; Hitch Younge	Member of Parliament for Steyning; 1747–1754; With: Hitch Younge	Succeeded by Hitch Younge; Alexander Hume
Preceded by John Fuller; William Trevanion	Member of Parliament for Tregony; 1761–1768; With: William Trevanion to 1767; Thomas Pownall from 1767	Succeeded by John Grey; Thomas Pownall
Baronetage of Great Britain
New creation	Baronet (of Wormleybury, Herts); 1769–1772	Succeeded by Abraham Hume
