= Sir Alexander Leith, 1st Baronet, of Newcastle-upon-Tyne =

Sir Walter Alexander Leith, 1st Baronet MC (24 September 1869 – 9 November 1956) was a British benefactor.

Leith was the son of Walter Leith, of Ashby de la Zouch, Leicestershire, and Walmer Court, Kent and was educated at Windlesham House School, Harrow and Brasenose College, Oxford. Afterwards he was the director of a colliery and several iron companies. He served as a lieutenant colonel in World War I with the Northumberland Hussars and was awarded the Military Cross for his part in the Gallipoli campaign. In 1919 he was created a Baronet.

Leith was High Sheriff of Northumberland in 1923 and later a Deputy Lieutenant of that county. He presented the Gosforth Cup to Newcastle Racecourse in 1951. His seat was at Greycourt, near Riding Hall, Hexham.

A leading member of the Conservative and Unionist Party in the north of England, in 1929 Leith persuaded the Prince of Wales to make a three-day visit to the County Durham and Northumberland coal-fields, where at the time many miners were suffering from unemployment.

Leith died in November 1956, aged 87, when the baronetcy became extinct.

Baronetage of the United Kingdom
New creation	Baronet (of Newcastle-upon-Tyne); 1919–1956	Extinct
