= Sir Alexander Leith, 1st Baronet, of Burgh St Peter =

British soldier and politician

Sir Alexander Charles George Leith, 1st Baronet (1741–1780) was a British soldier and politician who sat in the House of Commons between 1774 and 1780.

Leith was the son of Alexander Leith and his wife Anne, who was the widow of John Milet of County Antrim. His father was killed at the siege of Havana in 1762. Leith joined the Royal Artillery and was lieutenant and fireworker in 1759. In 1764, he became first lieutenant. He joined the service of the East India Company in 1768. He married firstly Margaret Wren, a widow and daughter of Thomas Hay of Huntington. He married secondly a daughter of General Sir John Cope on 1 March 1775.

At the 1774 general election, Leith was returned unopposed as Member of Parliament for Tregony, which was in the gift of the Treasury. He was a candidate at the last minute and was not one of the names that Lord North had put forward for the seat. Lord North, however, had him created baronet of Burgh St Peter, Norfolk on 21 November 1775. By 1778, however, Leith had become a fierce opponent of Lord North’s government. This may have been because he was not posted to Madras, but in 1779, he became lieutenant-colonel of the 88th Foot and was sent to the West Indies. He was not selected for a seat at the 1780 general election.

Leith died of excessive fatigue in Jamaica on 3 October 1780 while commanding an expedition to the Spanish Main.

Parliament of Great Britain
Preceded by Thomas Pownall; Hon. John Grey	Member of Parliament for Tregony; 1774–1780; With: Hon. George Lane Parker	Succeeded by John Stephenson; John Dawes
Baronetage of Great Britain
New creation	Baronet (of Burgh St Peter); 1775-1780	Succeeded by George Alexander William Leith
