= Richard Penkevell =

Richard Penkevell (died 1616) was an English adventurer who went in search of the Northwest Passage and became Member of parliament (MP) for Tregony.

== Life and career ==
He was the eldest son of Francis Penkevell (d. 1622), of Roserrow by Katherine (d.1621), daughter of Richard Roscarrock of Roscarrock in St Endellion. Penkevell's family had lived at St Michael Penkevil, near Truro, Cornwall since at least the time of Edward II of England, and had intermarried with many leading Cornish families.

In 1607 along with others he was granted a licence by King James I for seven years to discover the passage to China, Cathay, the Moluccas and other regions of the East Indies by the North, North-east or North-west, incorporated as the "Colleagues of the fellowship for the discovery of the North West passage". Any lands discovered (not already found by Christians) would be theirs in perpetuity with the Crown sovereign supreme. Furthermore, if the venture proved successful within seven years, the licence would be extended to 21 years with the Crown taking 20% of all gold, silver and other precious materials brought into England. However, nothing came of the project, possibly because it was too soon after the voyage of John Knight or because of opposition from the established City of London merchants.

The Colleagues went on to promote Henry Hudson's last voyage in 1610, and in July 1612 he is mentioned with Peter, Benjamin, Nicholas and Digory Penkevell among members of a company for the discovery of the North West passage.

His election as MP for Tregony was influenced by his connections with the Pomeroy family. After his death his estates passed to his son in 1622, but had been lost before the end of the century.

== Personal life ==
Some time after 1590 he married Jane (d.1623), daughter of ?Hugh Pomeroy of Tregony.
