= Francis Hale Rigby =

British politician

Lieutenant-Colonel Francis Hale Rigby (circa 1758 – 17 August 1827) was a British politician who sat in the House of Commons from 1779 to 1784.

Born Francis Hale, he was the son of General Bernard Hale by his wife Martha Rigby. He was probably educated at Eton College from 1768 to 1773, then at the University of Lausanne from 1773 to 1779. He was elected Member of Parliament for Mitchell on 22 September 1779, and followed his uncle Richard Rigby in supporting the North Ministry and then the Fox-North Coalition, losing his seat in 1784.

On 3 March 1785 he married Frances, daughter of Sir Thomas Rumbold, 1st Baronet; they had one daughter. He succeeded his uncle to the Mistley estate in Essex and adopted the surname of Rigby on 8 April 1788. On 10 January 1810 he was appointed Colonel of the Eastern Battalion of the Essex Militia.

Hale Rigby's daughter and heiress Frances (died 6 September 1860) was married on 9 February 1808 to William Horace Beckford, later 3rd Baron Rivers. They sold Mistley in 1844, when the Hall was demolished.

Parliament of Great Britain
Preceded by John Stephenson; Hon. Thomas Howard	Member of Parliament for Mitchell; 1779–1784; With: John Stephenson; Hon. William Hanger	Succeeded by David Howell; Sir Christopher Hawkins
