= Tregony (constituency) =

Former parliamentary constituency in the United Kingdom

- Former borough constituency for the House of Commons

1562–1832
- Seats: Two

Tregony was a rotten borough in Cornwall first represented in the Model Parliament of 1295. It continuously returned two Members of Parliament to the English, and later British, Parliament from 1562 to 1832, when it was abolished by the Great Reform Act.

== History ==
The borough consisted of the town of Tregony. Like most Cornish boroughs enfranchised or re-enfranchised during the Tudor period, it was a settlement of little initial importance or wealth. It was not incorporated as a municipal borough until sixty years after it began to return members to Parliament in 1563.

Tregony was a potwalloper borough, meaning every male householder with a separate fireplace capable of boiling a pot was entitled to vote. The apparently democratic nature of this arrangement was a delusion in a borough as small and poor as Tregony, where the residents could not afford to defy their landlord who regarded their vote as a means of income. Many of the houses in the borough were built purely for political purposes, and the borough itself was bought and sold for its political value on numerous occasions. In the 1760s, Viscount Falmouth (head of the Boscawen family) influenced the nomination to one of the two seats and William Trevanion the other; later the Earl of Darlington controlled both seats, together with others in Cornwall, but by the time of the Great Reform Act, the patronage had been transferred again to James Adam Gordon.

In 1831, the borough's population was 1,127, and 234 houses. Nevertheless, because of the wide franchise it had a comparatively large electorate for the time, numbering between 260 and 300 voters.

== Members of Parliament ==
=== MPs 1559–1629 ===
| Parliament | First member | Second member |
|---|---|---|
| Parliament of 1558–9 | Peter Osborne | Adrian Poynings |
| Parliament of 1563–1567 | Edward Ameredith | Giles Laurence |
| Parliament of 1571 | Sir Edward Hastings | Robert Dormer |
| Parliament of 1572–1581 | William Knollys | Peter Wentworth |
| Parliament of 1584–1585 | Sir John St Leger | Richard Grafton |
| Parliament of 1586–1587 | Richard Trevanion | Oliver Carminowe |
| Parliament of 1588–1589 | Richard Penkevell | Christopher Walker |
| Parliament of 1593 | John Snow | Arnold Oldisworth |
| Parliament of 1597–1598 | Sir Edward Denny | Henry Birde |
| Parliament of 1601 | Lewis Darte | Thomas Trevor |
| Parliament of 1604–1611 | Henry Pomeroy | Richard Garveigh |
| Addled Parliament (1614) | William Hakewill | Thomas Malet |
| Parliament of 1621–1622 | William Hakewill | Thomas Malet |
| Happy Parliament (1624–1625) | Peter Specott | Ambrose Manaton |
| Useless Parliament (1625) | Sir Henry Carey | Sebastian Goode |
| Parliament of 1625–1626 | Thomas Carey | Sir Robert Killigrew |
| Parliament of 1628–1629 | Francis Rous | Sir John Arundell |
No Parliament summoned 1629–1640

=== MPs 1640–1832 ===
| Year | First member | First party | Second member | Second party |
|---|---|---|---|---|
| April 1640 | John St Aubyn | | Sir John Arundell | |
| November 1640 | Sir Richard Vyvyan | Royalist | John Polwhele | Royalist |
| January 1644 | Vyvyan and Polwhele disabled from sitting - both seats vacant | | | |
| 1647 | John Carew | | Sir Thomas Trevor | |
| December 1648 | John Carew | | Trevor excluded in Pride's Purge - seat vacant | |
| 1653 | Tregony was unrepresented in the Barebones Parliament and the First and Second Parliaments of the Protectorate | | | |
| January 1659 | John Thomas | | Edward Boscawen | |
| May 1659 | Not represented in the restored Rump | | | |
| April 1660 | Sir John Temple | | Edward Boscawen | |
| October 1660 | Sir John Temple | | Sir Peter Courtney | |
| 1661 | Hugh Boscawen | Whig | Thomas Herle | |
| February 1679 | Hugh Boscawen | Whig | Robert Boscawen | |
| April 1679 | Hugh Boscawen | Whig | John Tanner | |
| August 1679 | Hugh Boscawen | Whig | Charles Trevanion | Tory |
| 1685 | Charles Porter | Tory | Charles Trevanion | Tory |
| January 1689 | Charles Boscawen | | Hugh Fortescue | Whig |
| April 1689 | Robert Harley | Whig | Hugh Fortescue | Whig |
| 1690 | Sir John Tremayne | Whig | Hugh Fortescue | Whig |
| 1694 | The Earl of Kildare | Whig | Hugh Fortescue | Whig |
| 1695 | Francis Robartes | | James Montagu | Whig |
| 1698 | Francis Robartes | | Philip Meadowes | |
| 1701 | Francis Robartes | | Hugh Fortescue | Whig |
| 1702 | Hugh Boscawen | Whig | Joseph Sawle | Tory |
| 1705 | John Trevanion | Tory | Sir Philip Meadowes | |
| 1708 | Anthony Nicoll | Whig | Thomas Herne | Tory |
| October 1710 | Viscount Rialton | Whig | John Trevanion | Tory |
| December 1710 | Viscount Rialton | Whig | George Robinson | Tory |
| April 1713 | Edward Southwell | Tory | George Robinson | Tory |
| September 1713 | Sir Edmund Prideaux | | James Craggs | Whig |
| 1720 | Charles Talbot | Whig | James Craggs | Whig |
| March 1721 | Charles Talbot | Whig | Daniel Pulteney | Whig |
| November 1721 | Charles Talbot | Whig | John Merrill | Whig |
| 1722 | James Cooke | | John Merrill | Whig |
| 1727 | Thomas Smith | Whig | John Goddard | Whig |
| 1729 | Matthew Ducie Moreton | Whig | John Goddard | Whig |
| 1734 | Henry Penton | | John Goddard | Whig |
| February 1737 | Henry Penton | | Sir Robert Cowan | |
| March 1737 | Henry Penton | | Joseph Gulston | |
| 1741 | Henry Penton | | Thomas Watts | |
| 1742 | Henry Penton | | George Cooke | |
| 1747 | William Trevanion | Whig | Claudius Amyand | Whig |
| 1754 | William Trevanion | Whig | John Fuller | |
| 1761 | William Trevanion | Whig | Abraham Hume | |
| 1767 | Thomas Pownall | | Abraham Hume | |
| 1768 | Thomas Pownall | | Hon. John Grey | |
| 1774 | Hon. George Lane Parker | | Alexander Leith | |
| 1780 | John Stephenson | | John Dawes | |
| 1784 | Lloyd Kenyon | | Robert Kingsmill | |
| 1788 | Hon. Hugh Seymour | | Robert Kingsmill | |
| 1790 | John Stephenson | | Matthew Montagu | |
| 1794 | Hon. Robert Stewart | Whig | Matthew Montagu | |
| 1796 | Sir Lionel Copley | | John Nicholls | |
| 1802 | Marquess of Blandford | Tory | Charles Cockerell | |
| 1804 | George Woodford Thellusson | Tory | Charles Cockerell | |
| 1806 | Godfrey Wentworth Wentworth | Whig | James O'Callaghan | Whig |
| 1808 | William Gore-Langton | Whig | James O'Callaghan | Whig |
| 1812 | Alexander Cray Grant | Tory | William Holmes | Tory |
| 1818 | Viscount Barnard | Whig | James O'Callaghan | Whig |
| 1826 | Stephen Lushington | Whig | James Brougham | Whig |
| 1830 | James Adam Gordon | Tory | James Mackillop | Tory |
| 1831 | Lt Colonel Charles Arbuthnot | Tory | James Mackillop | Tory |
| 1832 | James Adam Gordon | Tory | James Mackillop | Tory |
| 1832 | Constituency abolished | | | |
