= Richard Grafton (born c. 1563) =

English politician

Richard Grafton (born c. 1563) was an English politician.

He was an MP for Plympton Erle in 1589 and Tregony in 1584.
