= Leith-Buchanan baronets =

Title in the Baronetage of Great Britain

Escutcheon of the Leith baronets of Burgh St Peter

The Leith, later Leith-Buchanan baronetcy, of Burgh St Peter in the County of Norfolk, is a title in the Baronetage of Great Britain. It was created on 21 November 1775 for Alexander Leith, Member of Parliament for Tregony. The Leith family is of Scottish origin and descends from William Leith, Provost of Aberdeen in the 14th century.

The 3rd Baronet married Jemima, daughter of Hector Macdonald Buchanan; their son the 4th Baronet assumed the additional surname of Buchanan in 1877. The title is marked dormant on the Official Roll of the Baronetage.

== Leith, later Leith-Buchanan baronets, of Burgh St Peter (1775) ==
- Sir Alexander Leith, 1st Baronet (1741–1780)
- Sir George Alexander William Leith, 2nd Baronet (c. 1765–1842)
- Sir Alexander William Wellesley Leith, 3rd Baronet (1806–1842)
- Sir George Hector Leith-Buchanan, 4th Baronet (1833–1903)
- Sir Alexander Wellesley George Thomas Leith-Buchanan, 5th Baronet (1866–1925)
- Sir George Hector Macdonald Leith-Buchanan, 6th Baronet (1889–1973)
- Charles Alexander James Leith-Buchanan,7th Baronet (1939–1998)
- Gordon Kelly McNicol Leith-Buchanan, presumed 8th Baronet (1974–2018): did not appear on the Official Roll.
- Scott Kelly Leith-Buchanan, presumed 9th Baronet (born 2010): does not appear on the Official Roll.

== Notes ==
Baronetage of Great Britain
Preceded by Boyd baronets	Leith baronets of Burgh St Peter; 21 November 1775	Succeeded by Etherington baronets
