= List of MPs elected in the 1807 United Kingdom general election =

1807–1812 Parliament of the United Kingdom
←	1806–1807 Parliament	1812–1818 Parliament	→
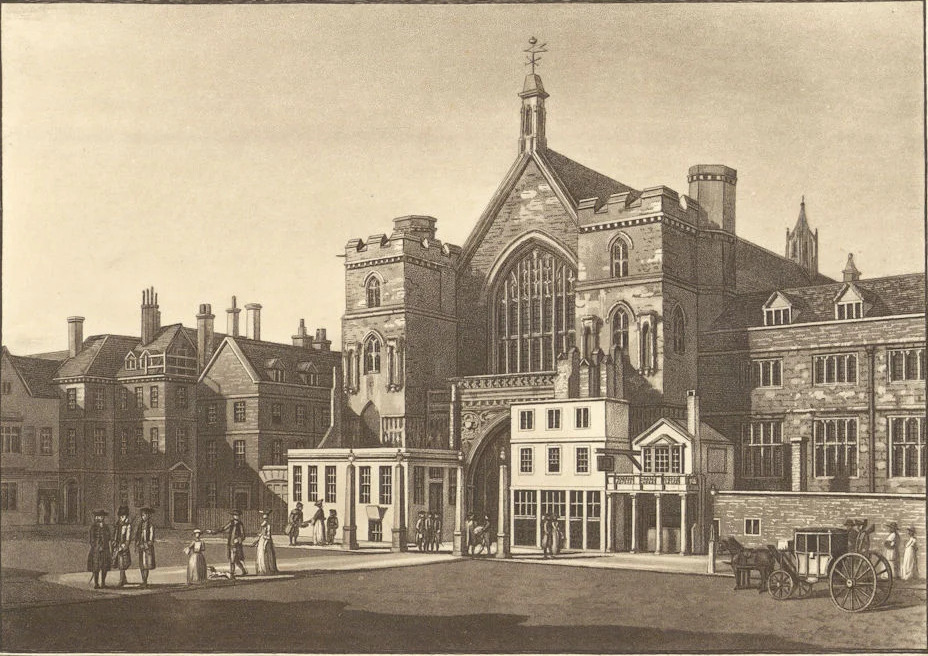
- The Palace of Westminster in 1808

Overview
- Legislative body: Parliament of the United Kingdom
- Jurisdiction: United Kingdom
- Meeting place: Palace of Westminster
- Term: 22 June 1807 – 30 July 1812
- Election: 1807 United Kingdom general election
- Government: Second Portland ministry (until 1809); Perceval ministry (from 1809)

Crown-in-Parliament George III

Sessions
- 1st: 22 June 1807 – 14 August 1807
- 2nd: 21 January 1808 – 4 July 1808
- 3rd: 19 January 1809 – 21 June 1809
- 4th: 23 January 1810 – 21 June 1810
- 5th: 1 November 1810 – 24 July 1811
- 6th: 7 January 1812 – 30 July 1812

This is a list of MPs elected in the 1807 United Kingdom general election, the 4th Parliament of the United Kingdom, and their replacements returned at subsequent by-elections, arranged by constituency.

Table of contents:

A B C D E F G H I J K L M N O P Q R S T U V W X Y Z By-elections Changes

== A ==
Aberdeen Burghs (seat 1/1)	James Farquhar	
Aberdeenshire (seat 1/1)	James Ferguson	Tory
Abingdon (seat 1/1)	George Knapp – died Replaced by Henry Bowyer 1809 – resigned Replaced by Sir George Bowyer 1811	Whig Whig
Aldborough (seat 1/2)	Henry Fynes	Tory
Aldborough (seat 2/2)	Gilbert Jones	Tory
Aldeburgh (seat 1/2)	Sir John Aubrey, Bt. – took office Replaced by Sandford Graham 1812	Whig
Aldeburgh (seat 2/2)	John McMahon	Tory
Amersham (seat 1/2)	Thomas Drake Tyrwhitt-Drake – died Replaced by William Tyrwhitt-Drake 1810	Tory
Amersham (seat 2/2)	Thomas Tyrwhitt-Drake	Tory
Andover (seat 1/2)	Thomas Assheton Smith I	Tory
Andover (seat 2/2)	Newton Fellowes	Whig
Anglesey (seat 1/1)	Berkeley Paget	Whig
Anstruther Easter Burghs (seat 1/1)	John Anstruther – died Replaced by Sir John Anstruther 1811	
County Antrim(seat 1/2)	Edmond Alexander MacNaghten	Tory
County Antrim (seat 2/2)	Hon. John O'Neill	Tory
Appleby (seat 1/2)	Viscount Howick – resigned Replaced by Nicholas Ridley-Colborne	Whig; Whig
Appleby (seat 2/2)	James Cuthbert	Whig
Argyllshire (seat 1/1)	Lord John Campbell	
Armagh (seat 1/1)	Patrick Duigenan	Tory
County Armagh (seat 1/2)	William Brownlow	Tory; Tory
County Armagh (seat 2/2)	William Richardson	Tory
Arundel (seat 1/2)	Sir Arthur Piggott	
Arundel (seat 2/2)	Francis Wilder	
Ashburton (seat 1/2)	Walter Palk – resigned Replaced by John Sullivan 1811	
Ashburton (seat 2/2)	Lord Charles Bentinck	
Athlone (seat 1/1)	Henry Wellesley – sat for Eye; Replaced by John Frewen Turner 1807	Tory
Aylesbury (seat 1/2)	George Nugent, 1st Bt.	
Aylesbury (seat 2/2)	George Cavendish – died Replaced by Thomas Hussey 1809	
Ayr Burghs (seat 1/1)	John Campbell – died Replaced by Duncan Campbell 1809	
Ayrshire (seat 1/1)	David Boyle – resigned Replaced by Sir Hew Dalrymple-Hamilton 1811	
== B ==
Banbury (seat 1/1)	William Praed Election void Replaced by Dudley Long North 1808	
Bandon	Viscount Boyle – succeeded to a peerage Replaced by George Tierney 1807	Tory; Whig
Banffshire (seat 1/1)	Sir William Grant	
Barnstaple (seat 1/2)	William Taylor	
Barnstaple (seat 2/2)	George Woodford Thellusson – died Replaced by William Busk 1812	
Bath (seat 1/2)	Lord John Thynne	
Bath (seat 2/2)	John Palmer – resigned Replaced by Charles Palmer 1808	
Beaumaris (seat 1/1)	The Lord Newborough– died Replaced by Sir Edward Lloyd 1807	
Bedford (seat 1/2)	William Lee-Antonie	
Bedford (seat 2/2)	Samuel Whitbread	
Bedfordshire (seat 1/2)	Hon. Richard FitzPatrick	Whig
Bedfordshire (seat 2/2)	Francis Pym	Whig
Belfast	James Edward May	Tory
Bere Alston (seat 1/2)	Hon. Josceline Percy	
Bere Alston (seat 2/2)	Lord Lovaine	
Berkshire (seat 1/2)	George Vansittart	Tory
Berkshire (seat 2/2)	Charles Dundas	Whig
Berwickshire (seat 1/1)	George Baillie	
Berwick-upon-Tweed (seat 1/2)	Alexander Allan	
Berwick-upon-Tweed (seat 2/2)	Sir Alexander Lockhart, Bt	
Beverley (seat 1/2)	John Wharton	Whig
Beverley (seat 2/2)	Richard William Howard Vyse	
Bewdley (seat 1/1)	Miles Peter Andrews	
Bishops Castle (seat 1/2)	William Clive	
Bishops Castle (seat 2/2)	John Robinson	
Bletchingley (seat 1/2)	John Alexander Bannerman; Replaced in May by Thomas Freeman Heathcote– resigned Replaced by Charles Cockrell 1809	
Bletchingley (seat 2/2)	William Kenrick	
Bodmin (seat 1/2)	Sir William Oglander – resigned Replaced by Charles Bragge Bathurst 1812	
Bodmin (seat 2/2)	Davies Giddy	
Boroughbridge (seat 1/2)	William Henry Clinton	Tory
Boroughbridge (seat 2/2)	Henry Dawkins – resigned Replaced by Henry Clinton 1808	Tory
Bossiney (seat 1/2)	Hon. James Stuart-Wortley	Tory
Bossiney (seat 2/2)	The Lord Rendlesham– died Replaced by The Earl of Desart 1808	Tory; Tory
Boston (seat 1/2)	William Alexander Madocks	
Boston (seat 2/2)	Thomas Fydell – died Replaced by Peter Drummond-Burrell 1812	
Brackley (seat 1/2)	Anthony Henderson – died Replaced by Henry Wrottesley 1810	
Brackley (seat 2/2)	Robert Haldane Bradshaw	
Bramber (seat 1/2)	John Irving	
Bramber (seat 2/2)	Henry Jodrell	
Brecon (seat 1/1)	Sir Robert Salusbury, Bt	Tory
Breconshire (seat 1/1)	Thomas Wood	
Bridgnorth (seat 1/2)	Isaac Hawkins Browne	
Bridgnorth (seat 2/2)	Thomas Whitmore	
Bridgwater (seat 1/2)	William Astell	
Bridgwater (seat 2/2)	George Pocock	
Bridport (seat 1/2)	Sir Samuel Hood, Bt	
Bridport (seat 2/2)	Sir Evan Nepean, Bt	
Bristol (seat 1/2)	Charles Bragge Bathurst took office Replaced by Richard Hart Davis 1812	
Bristol (seat 2/2)	Evan Baillie	
Buckingham (seat 1/2)	Hon. Richard Griffin	
Buckingham (seat 2/2)	Thomas Grenville – resigned Replaced by Lord George Grenville 1810	
Buckinghamshire (seat 1/2)	Earl Temple	
Buckinghamshire (seat 2/2)	Marquess of Titchfield – succeeded to a peerage Replaced by William Selby Lowndes 1810	
Bury St Edmunds (seat 1/2)	Lord Charles FitzRoy	
Bury St Edmunds (seat 2/2)	The Lord Templetown	
Buteshire (seat 0/0)	Alternated with Caithness. No representation in 1807	
== C ==
Caernarvon Boroughs (seat 1/1)	Hon. Sir Charles Paget	
Caernarvonshire (seat 1/1)	Robert Williams	
Caithness (seat 0/0)	Sir John Sinclair – took office Replaced by George Sinclair 1811	Whig; Whig
Callington (seat 1/2)	Lord Binning	
Callington (seat 2/2)	Thomas Carter – resigned Replaced by William Stephen Poyntz 1810	
Calne (seat 1/2)	Joseph Jekyll	
Calne (seat 2/2)	Henry Smith	
Cambridge (seat 1/2)	Edward Finch	Tory
Cambridge (seat 2/2)	Robert Manners	Tory
Cambridgeshire (seat 1/2)	Lord Charles Manners	
Cambridgeshire (seat 2/2)	Charles Philip Yorke – took office Replaced by Lord Francis Godolphin Osborne 1810	Tory
Cambridge University (seat 1/2)	Sir Vicary Gibbs – took office Replaced by John Henry Smyth 1812	Tory
Cambridge University (seat 2/2)	Earl of Euston – succeeded to a peerage Replaced by The Viscount Palmerston 1811	Whig; Tory
Camelford (seat 1/2)	Robert Adair	Whig
Camelford (seat 2/2)	Lord Henry Petty – succeeded to a peerage Replaced by Henry Peter Brougham 1810	Whig; Whig
Canterbury (seat 1/2)	John Baker	Whig
Canterbury (seat 2/2)	Edward Taylor	
Cardiff Boroughs (seat 1/1)	Lord William Stuart	Tory
Cardigan Boroughs (seat 1/1)	Hon. John Vaughan	
Cardiganshire (seat 1/1)	Thomas Johnes	
Carlisle (seat 1/2)	Walter Spencer Stanhope	Tory
Carlisle (seat 2/2)	John Christian Curwen	Whig
Carlow (seat 1/1)	Andrew Strahan	Tory
County Carlow (seat 1/2)	David Latouche	Tory
County Carlow (seat 2/2)	Walter Bagenal	Tory
Carmarthen (seat 1/1)	Vice-Admiral George Campbell	
Carmarthenshire (seat 1/1)	Lord Robert Seymour	Tory
Carrickfergus (seat 1/1)	James Craig	Tory
Cashel (seat 1/1)	Quintin Dick – resigned Replaced by Robert Peel 1809	Tory; Tory
Castle Rising (seat 1/2)	Richard Sharp	
Castle Rising (seat 2/2)	Charles Bagot – resigned Replaced by Fulk Greville Howard 1808	
County Cavan (seat 1/2)	John Maxwell-Barry	Tory
County Cavan (seat 2/2)	Nathaniel Sneyd	Tory
Cheshire (seat 1/2)	Davies Davenport	
Cheshire (seat 2/2)	Thomas Cholmondeley	
Chester (seat 1/2)	John Grey Egerton	
Chester (seat 2/2)	Thomas Grosvenor	
Chichester (seat 1/2)	George White-Thomas	
Chichester (seat 2/2)	James du Pre	
Chippenham (seat 1/2)	James Dawkins	
Chippenham (seat 2/2)	John Maitland	
Christchurch (seat 1/2)	William Sturges Bourne	Tory
Christchurch (seat 2/2)	George Rose	
Cirencester (seat 1/2)	Michael Hicks-Beach	
Cirencester (seat 2/2)	Joseph Cripps	
Clackmannanshire (seat 1/1)	Alternated with Kinross-shire. Unrepresented in this Parliament	
County Clare (seat 1/2)	Francis Nathaniel Burton – resigned Replaced by Augustine Fitzgerald 1808	
County Clare (seat 2/2)	Sir Edward O'Brien, 4th Baronet	Whig
Clitheroe (seat 1/2)	John Cust – succeeded to a peerage Replaced by James Gordon 1808	
Clitheroe (seat 2/2)	Hon. Robert Curzon	
Clonmel (seat 1/1)	Rt Hon. William Bagwell	Tory
Cockermouth (seat 1/2)	James Lowther – sat for Cumberland; Replaced by John Osborn 1807 – resigned Replaced by Viscount Lowther 1808	Tory; Tory
Cockermouth (seat 2/2)	James Graham	Tory
Colchester (seat 1/2)	Robert Thornton	Tory
Colchester (seat 2/2)	Richard Hart Davis – resigned Replaced by Hart Davis 1812	Tory; Tory
Coleraine (seat 1/1)	Walter Jones – resigned Replaced by John Poo Beresford 1809	Tory; Tory
Corfe Castle (seat 1/2)	Peter William Baker	Tory
Corfe Castle (seat 2/2)	Henry Bankes	Tory
Cork (seat 1/2)	Hon. Christopher Hely-Hutchinson	Tory
Cork (seat 2/2)	Mountifort Longfield	Tory
County Cork (seat 1/2)	Viscount Bernard	
County Cork (seat 2/2)	Hon. George Ponsonby	Tory
Cornwall (seat 1/2)	John Hearle Tremayne	Tory
Cornwall (seat 2/2)	Sir William Lemon, Bt	Whig
Coventry (seat 1/2)	William Mills	
Coventry (seat 2/2)	Peter Moore	
Cricklade (seat 1/2)	Lord Porchester – succeeded to a peerage Replaced by William Herbert 1811	
Cricklade (seat 2/2)	Thomas Goddard	
Cromartyshire (seat 0/0)	Robert Bruce Aeneas Macleod	
Cumberland (seat 1/2)	Viscount Morpeth	Tory
Cumberland (seat 2/2)	John Lowther	Tory
== D ==
Dartmouth (seat 1/2)	Edmund Bastard	
Dartmouth (seat 2/2)	Arthur Howe Holdsworth	
Denbigh Boroughs (seat 1/1)	Robert Myddelton Biddulph	
Denbighshire (seat 1/1)	Sir Watkin Williams-Wynn, 5th Baronet	
Derby (seat 1/2)	William Cavendish – died Replaced by Henry Frederick Compton Cavendish 1812	
Derby (seat 2/2)	Edward Coke	
Derbyshire (seat 1/2)	George Cavendish	Whig
Derbyshire (seat 2/2)	Edward Miller Mundy	Tory
Devizes (seat 1/2)	Joshua Smith	
Devizes (seat 2/2)	Thomas Grimston Estcourt	
Devon (seat 1/2)	John Pollexfen Bastard	Tory
Devon (seat 2/2)	Sir Lawrence Palk, Bt	
County Donegal (seat 1/2)	Sir James Stewart, Bt	Tory
County Donegal (seat 2/2)	Henry Vaughan Brooke – died Replaced by Henry Conyngham Montgomery 1808	Tory
Dorchester (seat 1/2)	Cropley Ashley Cooper – succeeded to a peerage Replaced by Charles Henry Bouverie 1811	
Dorchester (seat 2/2)	Robert Williams	
Dorset (seat 1/2)	Edward Berkeley Portman	
Dorset (seat 2/2)	William Morton Pitt	
Dover (seat 1/2)	John Jackson	
Dover (seat 2/2)	Charles Jenkinson	
County Down (seat 1/2)	Hon. John Meade	
County Down (seat 2/2)	Francis Savage – resigned Replaced by Robert Ward 1812	
Downpatrick	John Wilson Croker	Tory
Downton (seat 1/2)	Hon. Bartholomew Bouverie	Whig
Downton (seat 2/2)	Sir Thomas Plumer	Tory
Drogheda	Hon. Thomas Foster	Tory
Droitwich (seat 1/2)	Sir Thomas Winnington, Bt	Whig
Droitwich (seat 2/2)	Andrew Foley	Whig
Dublin (seat 1/2)	Robert Shaw	Tory
Dublin (seat 2/2)	Rt Hon. Henry Grattan	Tory
County Dublin (seat 1/2)	Hans Hamilton	Tory
County Dublin (seat 2/2)	Richard Talbot	Whig
Dublin University	John Leslie Foster	Tory
Dumfries Burghs (seat 1/1)	Sir John Heron-Maxwell	
Dumfriesshire (seat 1/1)	Sir William Johnstone Hope	
Dunbartonshire (seat 1/1)	Henry Glassford – resigned Replaced by Archibald Campbell-Colquhoun 1810	Tory
Dundalk	Josias Porcher – sat for Old Sarum; Replaced by Patrick Craufurd Bruce 1807 – resigned Replaced by Thomas Hughan 1808 – died Replaced by Frederick William Trench 1812	Tory
Dungannon	Lord Claude Hamilton – died Replaced by Claude Scott 1809	Tory
Dungarvan	Hon. George Walpole	Tory
Dunwich (seat 1/2)	Snowdon Barne	
Dunwich (seat 2/2)	The Lord Huntingfield	
Durham (City of) (seat 1/2)	Richard Wharton	
Durham (City of) (seat 2/2)	Ralph John Lambton	
Durham (County) (seat 1/2)	Sir Henry Vane-Tempest, Bt	Tory
Durham (County) (seat 2/2)	Ralphe Milbanke	Whig
Dysart Burghs (seat 1/1)	Sir Ronald Crauford Ferguson	Whig
== E ==
East Grinstead (seat 1/2)	Sir Nathaniel Holland – died Replaced by Richard Wellesley 1812 – resigned Replaced by George William Gunning 1812 – resigned Replaced by Nicholas Vansittart	
East Grinstead (seat 2/2)	Charles Rose Ellis	
East Looe (seat 1/2)	Sir Edward Buller	Tory
East Looe (seat 2/2)	David Vanderheyden	Tory
East Retford (seat 1/2)	Charles Craufurd	
East Retford (seat 2/2)	William Ingilby	
Edinburgh (seat 1/1)	Sir Patrick Murray – resigned Replaced by William Dundas 1812	
Edinburghshire (seat 1/1)	Robert Saunders Dundas – succeeded to a peerage Replaced by Sir George Clerk 1811	
Elgin Burghs (seat 1/1)	Archibald Campbell-Colquhoun – resigned Replaced by William Dundas 1810– resigned Replaced by Archibald Campbell to contest Edinburgh 1812	
Elginshire (seat 1/1)	Francis William Grant	Tory
Ennis	James Fitzgerald – resigned Replaced by William Fitzgerald 1808	Tory
Enniskillen	Charles Pochin	Tory
Essex (seat 1/2)	John Bullock– died Replaced by John Archer Houblon 1810	
Essex (seat 2/2)	Eliab Harvey	
Evesham (seat 1/2)	William Manning	
Evesham (seat 2/2)	Sir Manasseh Masseh Lopes – unseated on petition Replaced by Humphrey Howorth 1808	Tory; Whig
Exeter (seat 1/2)	Sir Charles Warwick Bampfylde	
Exeter (seat 2/2)	James Buller	
Eye (seat 1/2)	Henry Wellesley – resigned Replaced by Charles Arbuthnot 1809|	
Eye (seat 2/2)	Mark Singleton	
== F ==
County Fermanagh (seat 1/2)	Mervyn Archdall	Tory
County Fermanagh (seat 2/2)	Hon. Galbraith Lowry Cole	Tory
Fife (seat 1/1)	William Wemyss	
Flint Boroughs (seat 1/1)	William Shipley	
Flintshire (seat 1/1)	Sir Thomas Mostyn	
Forfarshire (seat 1/1)	William Maule	
Fowey (seat 1/2)	Reginald Pole Carew	Tory
Fowey (seat 2/2)	Robert Wigram (junior)	Tory
== G ==
Galway	James Daly– resigned Replaced by Frederick Ponsonby 1811	Tory
County Galway (seat 1/2)	Richard Martin	Tory
County Galway (seat 2/2)	Denis Bowes Daly	Tory
Gatton (seat 1/2)	Sir Mark Wood, Bt	
Gatton (seat 2/2)	George Bellas Greenough	
Glamorganshire (seat 1/1)	Thomas Wyndham	
Glasgow Burghs (seat 1/1)	Archibald Campbell – resigned Replaced by Alexander Houstoun 1809	
Gloucester (seat 1/2)	Henry Thomas Howard	Whig
Gloucester (seat 2/2)	Robert Morris	Whig
Gloucestershire (seat 1/2)	Lord Edward Somerset	Tory
Gloucestershire (seat 2/2)	George Cranfield Berkeley – resigned Replaced by Viscount Dursley 1810	Tory
Grampound (seat 1/2)	Andrew Cochrane-Johnstone – Void Election; Replaced by Robert Williams 1808 – unseated on petition Replaced by William Holmes 1808	Whig
Grampound (seat 2/2)	George Augustus Frederick Cochrane – Void Election; Replaced by John Teed 1808 – unseated on petition Replaced by Andrew James Cochrane Johnstone 1812	
Grantham (seat 1/2)	Thomas Thoroton	
Grantham (seat 2/2)	Sir William Earle Welby, Bt	
Great Bedwyn (seat 1/2)	Sir Vicary Gibbs	Tory
Great Bedwyn (seat 2/2)	James Henry Leigh	Tory
Great Grimsby (seat 1/2)	Hon. Charles Anderson-Pelham – unseated on petition Replaced by Colonel John Henry Loft 1808	
Great Grimsby (seat 2/2)	William Ellice	
Great Marlow (seat 1/2)	Pascoe Grenfell	Whig
Great Marlow (seat 2/2)	Owen Williams	Whig
Great Yarmouth (seat 1/2)	Hon. Edward Harbord	Whig
Great Yarmouth (seat 2/2)	Stephen Lushington – resigned Replaced by Giffin Wilson 1808	Whig
Guildford (seat 1/2)	Thomas Cranley Onslow	Tory
Guildford (seat 2/2)	Chapple Norton	Whig
== H ==
Haddington Burghs (seat 1/1)	Sir George Warrender, 4th Baronet	
Haddingtonshire (seat 1/1)	Charles Hope	
Hampshire (seat 1/2)	Sir Henry Paulet St. John Mildmay – died Replaced by Thomas Freeman Heathcote 1808	
Hampshire (seat 2/2)	William John Chute	
Harwich (seat 1/2)	William Huskisson	Tory
Harwich (seat 2/2)	John Hiley Addington	
Haslemere (seat 1/2)	Robert Ward	Tory
Haslemere (seat 2/2)	Charles Long	Tory
Hastings (seat 1/2)	George Canning	
Hastings (seat 2/2)	Sir Abraham Hume	
Haverfordwest (seat 1/1)	The 2nd Baron Kensington	
Hedon (seat 1/2)	George Johnstone	
Hedon (seat 2/2)	Anthony Browne	
Helston (seat 1/2)	Sir John St Aubyn, Bt	
Helston (seat 2/2)	Richard Richards – resigned Replaced by The Lord Dufferin and Claneboye 1807	
Hereford (seat 1/2)	Thomas Powell Symonds	
Hereford (seat 2/2)	Richard Philip Scudamore	
Herefordshire (seat 1/2)	Thomas Foley	cWhig
Herefordshire (seat 2/2)	Sir John Cotterell, Bt	Tory
Hertford (seat 1/2)	Edward Spencer Cowper	Whig
Hertford (seat 2/2)	Nicolson Calvert	Whig
Hertfordshire (seat 1/2)	Hon. Thomas Brand	Whig
Hertfordshire (seat 2/2)	Sir John Sebright, Bt	Whig
Heytesbury (seat 1/2)	Dr Charles Moore	
Heytesbury (seat 2/2)	Viscount FitzHarris	
Higham Ferrers (seat 1/1)	William Windham – died Replaced by Viscount Duncannon 1810	Whig; Whig
Hindon (seat 1/2)	William Beckford	Whig
Hindon (seat 2/2)	Benjamin Hobhouse	Whig
Honiton (seat 1/2)	Sir Charles Hamilton	
Honiton (seat 2/2)	Augustus Cavendish-Bradshaw	
Horsham (seat 1/2)	Sir Samuel Romilly – unseated on petition Replaced by Joseph Marryat 1808	
Horsham (seat 2/2)	Love Jones-Parry – unseated on petition Replaced by Henry Goulburn 1808	
Huntingdon (seat 1/2)	William Meeke Farmer – resigned Replaced by Samuel Farmer	
Huntingdon (seat 2/2)	John Calvert	
Huntingdonshire (seat 1/2)	Viscount Hinchingbrooke	
Huntingdonshire (seat 2/2)	William Henry Fellowes	
Hythe (seat 1/2)	William Deedes	
Hythe (seat 2/2)	Thomas Godfrey – died Replaced by Sir John Perring	
== I ==
Ilchester (seat 1/2)	Richard Brinsley Sheridan	Whig
Ilchester (seat 2/2)	Michael Angelo Taylor	Whig
Inverness Burghs (seat 1/1)	Peter Baillie – died Replaced by Charles Grant 1811	
Inverness-shire (seat 1/1)	Charles Grant (senior)	Pittite/Tory
Ipswich (seat 1/2)	Sir Home Riggs Popham	
Ipswich (seat 2/2)	Robert Alexander Crickitt	
== K ==
Kent (seat 1/2)	Sir Edward Knatchbull, Bt	Tory
Kent (seat 2/2)	William Honywood	Whig
County Kerry (seat 1/2)	Henry Arthur Herbert	Whig
County Kerry (seat 2/2)	Rt Hon. Maurice Fitzgerald	Whig
County Kildare (seat 1/2)	Lord Robert Stephen Fitzgerald	Whig
County Kildare (seat 2/2)	Robert La Touche	Whig
Kilkenny (seat 1/1)	Charles Harward Butler – resigned Replaced by Robert Williams 1809	Whig
County Kilkenny (seat 1/2)	Hon. Frederick Ponsonby	Whig
County Kilkenny (seat 2/2)	Hon. James Butler	Whig
Kincardineshire (seat 1/1)	William Adam – resigned Replaced by George Harley Drummond 1812	
King's County (seat 1/2)	Hardress Lloyd	Tory
King's County (seat 2/2)	Thomas Bernard (senior)	Tory
King's Lynn (seat 1/2)	Lord Walpole – succeeded to a peerage Replaced by Lord Walpole 1809	
King's Lynn (seat 2/2)	Sir Martin ffolkes, Bt	
Kingston upon Hull (seat 1/2)	Viscount Mahon	Whig
Kingston upon Hull (seat 2/2)	John Staniforth	Tory
Kinross-shire (seat 0/0)	William Adam – sat for Kincardineshire; Replaced by David Clephane 1807 – took office Replaced by Thomas Graham 1811	
Kinsale (seat 1/1)	Henry Martin	Whig
Kirkcudbright Stewartry (seat 1/1)	Montgomery Granville John Stewart	Tory
Knaresborough (seat 1/2)	Viscount Ossulston	Whig
Knaresborough (seat 2/2)	Lord John Townshend	Whig
== L ==
Lanarkshire (seat 1/1)	Lord Archibald Hamilton	Whig
Lancashire (seat 1/2)	Thomas Stanley	
Lancashire (seat 2/2)	John Blackburne	
Lancaster (seat 1/2)	Peter Patten	
Lancaster (seat 2/2)	John Dent	
Launceston (seat 1/2)	Earl Percy – sat for Northumberland; Replaced by Richard Henry Alexander Bennet 1807 – resigned Replaced by Jonathan Raine 1812	Tory
Launceston (seat 2/2)	James Brogden	Tory
Leicester (seat 1/2)	Thomas Babington	
Leicester (seat 2/2)	Samuel Smith	
Leicestershire (seat 1/2)	Lord Robert William Manners	
Leicestershire (seat 2/2)	George Anthony Legh Keck	
County Leitrim (seat 1/2)	Henry John Clements	Tory
County Leitrim (seat 2/2)	John La Touche	
Leominster (seat 1/2)	John Lubbock	
Leominster (seat 2/2)	Henry Bonham	
Lewes (seat 1/2)	Henry Shelley – died Replaced by George Shiffner 1812	
Lewes (seat 2/2)	Thomas Kemp – died Replaced by Thomas Read Kemp 1811	
Lichfield (seat 1/2)	George Granville Venables Vernon	Whig
Lichfield (seat 2/2)	Sir George Anson	Whig
Limerick	Charles Vereker	Tory
County Limerick (seat 1/2)	Hon. William Henry Quin	
County Limerick (seat 2/2)	William Odell	
Lincoln (seat 1/2)	William Monson – died Replaced by The Earl of Mexborough 1808	
Lincoln (seat 2/2)	Richard Ellison	
Lincolnshire (seat 1/2)	Charles Anderson-Pelham	
Lincolnshire (seat 2/2)	Charles Chaplin	
Linlithgow Burghs (seat 1/1)	William Maxwell	
Linlithgowshire (seat 1/1)	Sir Alexander Hope	
Lisburn	Earl of Yarmouth	Tory
Liskeard (seat 1/2)	William Eliot	Tory
Liskeard (seat 2/2)	Viscount Hamilton	Tory
Liverpool (seat 1/2)	Isaac Gascoyne	Tory
Liverpool (seat 2/2)	Lieutenant General Banastre Tarleton	Tory
London (City of) (seat 1/4)	William Curtis	Tory
London (City of) (seat 2/4)	Sir James Shaw, Bt	Tory
London (City of) (seat 3/4)	Sir Charles Price	Tory
London (City of) (seat 4/4)	Harvey Christian Combe	Whig
Londonderry	Sir George Fitzgerald Hill, Bt	Tory
County Londonderry (seat 1/2)	Hon. Charles William Stewart	Tory
County Londonderry (seat 2/2)	Lord George Thomas Beresford	Tory
County Longford (seat 1/2)	Sir Thomas Fetherston, Bt	Tory
County Longford (seat 2/2)	Viscount Forbes	Tory
Lostwithiel (seat 1/2)	George Peter Holford	
Lostwithiel (seat 2/2)	Ebenezer Maitland	
County Louth (seat 1/2)	John Foster	Tory
County Louth (seat 2/2)	John Jocelyn – took office Replaced by Viscount Jocelyn 1810	Tory
Ludgershall (seat 1/2)	Magens Dorrien-Magens	Tory
Ludgershall (seat 2/2)	Thomas Everett – died Replaced by Joseph Hague Everett 1810 – resigned Replaced by The Lord Headley 1811	Tory; Tory; Tory
Ludlow (seat 1/2)	Viscount Clive	Tory
Ludlow (seat 2/2)	Henry Clive	
Lyme Regis (seat 1/2)	Henry Fane	Tory
Lyme Regis (seat 2/2)	Lord Burghersh	Tory
Lymington (seat 1/2)	George Duckett	
Lymington (seat 2/2)	John Kingston	
== M ==
Maidstone (seat 1/2)	George Simson	
Maidstone (seat 2/2)	George Longman	
Maldon (seat 1/2)	Joseph Holden Strutt	Tory
Maldon (seat 2/2)	Charles Callis Western	Whig
Mallow	Denham Jephson	Tory
Malmesbury (seat 1/2)	Sir George Bowyer – resigned Replaced by Abel Smith 1810	Tory; Tory
Malmesbury (seat 2/2)	Philip Gell	Tory
Malton (seat 1/2)	The Lord Headley Void Election; Replaced by Bryan Cooke 1808	Tory; Whig
Malton (seat 2/2)	Robert Lawrence Dundas|	
Marlborough (seat 1/2)	Lord Bruce	Whig
Marlborough (seat 2/2)	Viscount Stopford – succeeded to a peerage Replaced by Edward Stopford 1810	
County Mayo (seat 1/2)	Rt Hon. Denis Browne	Tory
County Mayo (seat 2/2)	Hon. Henry Augustus Dillon	Tory
County Meath (seat 1/2)	Thomas Bligh	Tory
County Meath (seat 2/2)	Sir Marcus Somerville, Bt	Tory
Merionethshire (seat 1/1)	Sir Robert Williames Vaughan	
Middlesex (seat 1/2)	George Byng	Whig
Middlesex (seat 2/2)	William Mellish	Tory
Midhurst (seat 1/2)	Samuel Smith – sat for Leicester; Replaced by Thomas Thompson 1807	Tory
Midhurst (seat 2/2)	James Abercromby	Whig
Milborne Port (seat 1/2)	Lord Paget – resigned Replaced by Viscount Lewisham 1810 – succeeded to a peerage Replaced by Edward Paget 1810	
Milborne Port (seat 2/2)	Hugh Leycester	
Minehead (seat 1/2)	John Denison	Tory
Minehead (seat 2/2)	John Fownes Luttrell 1807	Tory
Mitchell (seat 1/2)	Edward Leveson Gower – resigned Replaced by Sir James Hall 1807	Tory
Mitchell (seat 2/2)	George Galway Mills – resigned Replaced by Charles Trelawny-Brereton 1808 – resigned Replaced by John Bruce 1809	
County Monaghan (seat 1/2)	Richard Dawson – died Replaced by Thomas Charles Stewart Corry 1807	
County Monaghan (seat 2/2)	Charles Powell Leslie II	
Monmouth Boroughs (seat 1/1)	Lord Charles Somerset	
Monmouthshire (seat 1/2)	Lt Col. Sir Charles Morgan	
Monmouthshire (seat 2/2)	Capt Lord Arthur John Henry Somerset	
Montgomery (seat 1/1)	Whitshed Keene	
Montgomeryshire (seat 1/1)	Charles Williams-Wynn	Tory
Morpeth (seat 1/2)	William Ord	Whig
Morpeth (seat 2/2)	Hon. William Howard	
== N ==
Nairnshire (seat 0/0)	Alternated with Cromartyshire. No representation in 1807	
New Romney (seat 1/2)	The Earl of Clonmell	Tory
New Romney (seat 2/2)	Hon. George Ashburnham	Tory
New Ross	William Wigram	
New Shoreham (seat 1/2)	Sir Charles Merrik Burrell, Bt	Tory
New Shoreham (seat 2/2)	Timothy Shelley	
Newark (seat 1/2)	Henry Willoughby	Tory
Newark (seat 2/2)	Sir Stapleton Cotton, Bt	
Newcastle-under-Lyme (seat 1/2)	James Macdonald	
Newcastle-under-Lyme (seat 2/2)	Edward Bootle-Wilbraham	
Newcastle-upon-Tyne (seat 1/2)	Charles John Brandling	
Newcastle-upon-Tyne (seat 2/2)	Sir Matthew White Ridley, 2nd Baronet	
Newport (Cornwall) (seat 1/2)	William Northey	Tory
Newport (Cornwall) (seat 2/2)	Edward Morris	Whig
Newport (Isle of Wight) (seat 1/2)	The Viscount Palmerston – resigned Replaced by Cecil Bisshopp 1811	
Newport (Isle of Wight) (seat 2/2)	Sir Arthur Wellesley – resigned Replaced by Leonard Worsley-Holmes 1809	
Newry	Hon. Francis Needham	Tory
Newton (Lancashire) (seat 1/2)	Colonel Peter Heron	
Newton (Lancashire) (seat 2/2)	John Ireland Blackburne	
Newtown (Isle of Wight) (seat 1/2)	Sir Robert Barclay	Tory
Newtown (Isle of Wight) (seat 2/2)	Dudley Long North – resigned Replaced by George Anderson-Pelham 1808	Whig; Whig
Norfolk (seat 1/2)	Thomas Coke	Whig
Norfolk (seat 2/2)	Sir Jacob Astley, Bt	Whig
Northallerton (seat 1/2)	Hon. Edward Lascelles	Tory
Northallerton (seat 2/2)	Henry Peirse (younger)	Whig
Northampton (seat 1/2)	Spencer Perceval – assassinated Replaced by Lord Compton 1812	
Northampton (seat 2/2)	Edward Bouverie – died Replaced by William Hanbury 1810	
Northamptonshire (seat 1/2)	Viscount Althorp	Whig
Northamptonshire (seat 2/2)	William Ralph Cartwright	Tory
Northumberland (seat 1/2)	Charles Grey Earl Percy – succeeded to a peerage Replaced by Sir Charles Monck 1812	
Northumberland (seat 2/2)	Thomas Richard Beaumont	
Norwich (seat 1/2)	William Smith	Radical
Norwich (seat 2/2)	John Patteson	Tory
Nottingham (seat 1/2)	Daniel Parker Coke	
Nottingham (seat 2/2)	John Smith	Tory
Nottinghamshire (seat 1/2)	Anthony Hardolph Eyre	
Nottinghamshire (seat 2/2)	Charles Pierrepoint	
== O ==
Okehampton (seat 1/2)	Gwyllym Lloyd Wardle	Whig
Okehampton (seat 2/2)	Albany Savile	Tory
Old Sarum (seat 1/2)	Nicholas Vansittart – took office Replaced by James Alexander 1812	Tory; Tory
Old Sarum (seat 2/2)	Josias Porcher	Tory
Orford (seat 1/2)	Lord Robert Seymour – sat for Carmarthenshire; Replaced by William Sloane 1807	Tory
Orford (seat 2/2)	Lord Henry Moore	Tory
Orkney and Shetland (seat 1/1)	Malcolm Laing	
Oxford (seat 1/2)	Francis Burton	
Oxford (seat 2/2)	John Ingram Lockhart	
Oxfordshire (seat 1/2)	Lord Francis Spencer	
Oxfordshire (seat 2/2)	John Fane	
Oxford University (seat 1/2)	Sir William Scott	Tory
Oxford University (seat 2/2)	Charles Abbot	Tory
== P ==
Peeblesshire (seat 1/1)	James Montgomery	
Pembroke Boroughs (seat 1/1)	Hugh Barlow – died Replaced by Sir Hugh Owen 1809 – died Replaced by John Owen 1809	Whig; Tory; Tory
Pembrokeshire (seat 1/1)	Lord Milford	
Penryn (seat 1/2)	Henry Swann	Tory
Penryn (seat 2/2)	Charles Lemon	Whig
Perth Burghs (seat 1/1)	Sir David Wedderburn, Bt	Tory
Perthshire (seat 1/1)	Lord James Murray – resigned Replaced by James Andrew John Lawrence Charles Drummond 1812	
Peterborough (seat 1/2)	French Laurence – died Replaced by Marquess of Tavistock 1809	Whig; Whig
Peterborough (seat 2/2)	William Elliot	Whig
Petersfield (seat 1/2)	Hylton Jolliffe	
Petersfield (seat 2/2)	Booth Grey	
Plymouth (seat 1/2)	Thomas Tyrwhitt – took office Replaced by Benjamin Bloomfield 1812	
Plymouth (seat 2/2)	Admiral Sir Charles Pole	
Plympton Erle (seat 1/2)	Viscount Castlereagh	
Plympton Erle (seat 2/2)	William Assheton Harbord – succeeded to a peerage Replaced by Henry Drummond 1810	
Pontefract (seat 1/2)	Robert Pemberton Milnes	
Pontefract (seat 2/2)	John Savile	
Poole (seat 1/2)	Vacant – No return made due to tie Sir Richard Bickerton 1808	
Poole (seat 2/2)	John Jeffery – succeeded to a peerage Replaced by Benjamin Lester Lester 1809	
Portarlington	Hon. William Lamb	
Portsmouth (seat 1/2)	John Markham	Whig
Portsmouth (seat 2/2)	Sir Thomas Miller, Bt	Whig
Preston (seat 1/2)	Lord Stanley	Whig
Preston (seat 2/2)	Samuel Horrocks	Tory
== Q ==
Queenborough (seat 1/2)	Joseph Hunt – Expelled; Replaced by Richard Wellesley 1810 – took office Replaced by Robert Moorsom 1812	Tory; Tory; Tory
Queenborough (seat 2/2)	Hon. John Villiers	Tory
Queen's County (seat 1/2)	Hon. William Wellesley-Pole	Tory
Queen's County (seat 2/2)	Henry Brooke Parnell	Tory
== R ==
Radnor Boroughs (seat 1/1)	Richard Price	
Radnorshire (seat 1/1)	Walter Wilkins	Whig
Reading (seat 1/2)	Charles Shaw-Lefevre	
Reading (seat 2/2)	John Simeon	
Reigate (seat 1/2)	Edward Charles Cocks	
Reigate (seat 2/2)	Viscount Royston – died Replaced by James Cocks 1808	
Renfrewshire (seat 1/1)	Boyd Alexander William McDowall – died Replaced by Archibald Speirs 1810	
Richmond (Yorkshire) (seat 1/2)	Arthur Shakespeare – resigned Replaced by Lawrence Dundas 1808 – resigned Replaced by George Heneage Lawrence Dundas 1812	Whig
Richmond (Yorkshire) (seat 2/2)	Charles Lawrence Dundas – died Replaced by Robert Chaloner 1810	Whig
Ripon (seat 1/2)	Frederick John Robinson	Tory
Ripon (seat 2/2)	George Gipps	Tory
Rochester (seat 1/2)	John Calcraft	Whig
Rochester (seat 2/2)	Sir Thomas Thompson	
County Roscommon (seat 1/2)	Arthur French	Tory
County Roscommon (seat 2/2)	Hon. Stephen Mahon	Tory
Ross-shire (seat 1/1)	Alexander Mackenzie Fraser – died Replaced by Hugh Innes 1809	
Roxburghshire (seat 1/1)	John Rutherford	
Rutland (seat 1/2)	Gerard Noel Noel – resigned Replaced by Charles Noel Noel 1808	Whig
Rutland (seat 2/2)	The Lord Henniker	
Rye (seat 1/2)	Sir John Nicholl – sat for Great Bedwyn; Replaced by Sir William Elford 1807 – resigned Replaced by William Jacob 1808	
Rye (seat 2/2)	The Earl of Clancarty – took office Replaced by Stephen Rumbold Lushington 1807	
== S ==
St Albans (seat 1/2)	Joseph Thompson Halsey	
St Albans (seat 2/2)	James Walter Grimston – succeeded to a peerage Replaced by Daniel Giles 25 January 1809	Tory; Whig
St Germans (seat 1/2)	Joseph Sydney Yorke – resigned Replaced by Charles Philip Yorke 27 April 1810	Tory; Whig
St Germans (seat 2/2)	Matthew Montagu	Tory
St Ives (seat 1/2)	Samuel Stephens	
St Ives (seat 2/2)	Sir Walter Stirling, 1st Baronet	Whig
St Mawes (seat 1/2)	William Shipley – sat for the Flint Boroughs; Replaced by Viscount Ebrington 1807; Replaced by Scrope Bernard 1809	Whig; Tory
St Mawes (seat 2/2)	Scrope Bernard – resigned Replaced by Earl Gower 1808	Tory; Whig
Salisbury (seat 1/2)	Viscount Folkestone	
Salisbury (seat 2/2)	Matthew Russell	
Saltash (seat 1/2)	Hon. Richard Griffin	Whig
Saltash (seat 2/2)	John Pedley – resigned Replaced by Michael George Prendergast 1809	
Sandwich (seat 1/2)	Peter Rainier – died Replaced by John Spratt Rainier 1808	
Sandwich (seat 2/2)	Charles Jenkinson	
Scarborough (seat 1/2)	Charles Manners Sutton	Tory
Scarborough (seat 2/2)	Hon. Edmund Phipps	Tory
Seaford (seat 1/2)	George Hibbert	Tory
Seaford (seat 2/2)	John Leach	Tory
Selkirkshire (seat 1/1)	William Eliott-Lockhart	
Shaftesbury (seat 1/2)	Edward Loveden Loveden	Whig
Shaftesbury (seat 2/2)	Captain Sir Home Riggs Popham	
Shrewsbury (seat 1/2)	Thomas Jones – died Replaced by Henry Grey Bennet 1811	Tory; Whig
Shrewsbury (seat 2/2)	Hon. William Hill	Tory
Shropshire (seat 1/2)	John Kynaston	
Shropshire (seat 2/2)	John Cotes	
Sligo	George Canning	Tory
County Sligo (seat 1/2)	Edward Synge Cooper	Tory
County Sligo (seat 2/2)	Charles O'Hara	Tory
Somerset (seat 1/2)	Thomas Lethbridge	Tory
Somerset (seat 2/2)	William Dickinson	Tory
Southampton (seat 1/2)	George Henry Rose	
Southampton (seat 2/2)	Josias Jackson	
Southwark (seat 1/2)	Henry Thornton	Independent
Southwark (seat 2/2)	Sir Thomas Turton, Bt	
Stafford (seat 1/2)	Edward Monckton	Tory
Stafford (seat 2/2)	Richard Mansel-Philipps	Tory
Staffordshire (seat 1/2)	Sir Edward Littleton – died Replaced by Edward John Walhouse 1812	Whig
Staffordshire (seat 2/2)	Earl Gower Lord Granville Leveson Gower	Whig
Stamford (seat 1/2)	Albemarle Bertie – succeeded to a peerage Replaced by Charles Chaplin 1809	Tory
Stamford (seat 2/2)	John Leland – died Replaced by Evan Foulkes 1808	Tory
Steyning (seat 1/2)	James Lloyd	Whig
Steyning (seat 2/2)	Robert Hurst	Whig
Stirling Burghs (seat 1/1)	Alexander Campbell	
Stirlingshire (seat 1/1)	Charles Elphinstone Fleeming	
Stockbridge (seat 1/2)	Joseph Foster Barham	Whig
Stockbridge (seat 2/2)	George Porter	Whig
Sudbury (seat 1/2)	Sir John Coxe Hippisley	
Sudbury (seat 2/2)	Emanuel Felix Agar	
Suffolk (seat 1/2)	Sir Charles Bunbury, Bt	
Suffolk (seat 2/2)	Thomas Gooch	
Surrey (seat 1/2)	Samuel Thornton	Whig
Surrey (seat 2/2)	George Holme Sumner	Tory
Sussex (seat 1/2)	John Fuller	
Sussex (seat 2/2)	Charles William Wyndham	
Sutherland (seat 1/1)	William Dundas – resigned Replaced by John Randoll Mackenzie 1808 – died Replaced by George Macpherson Grant 1809	Tory
== T ==
Tain Burghs (seat 1/1)	John Randoll Mackenzie – resigned Replaced by William Henry Fremantle 1808	
Tamworth (seat 1/2)	William Loftus	
Tamworth (seat 2/2)	Sir Robert Peel	Tory
Taunton (seat 1/2)	Alexander Baring	
Taunton (seat 2/2)	John Hammet – died Replaced by Henry Powell Collins 1811	
Tavistock (seat 1/2)	Lord William Russell	Whig
Tavistock (seat 2/2)	Richard Fitzpatrick – sat for Bedfordshire; Replaced by Viscount Howick 1807 – succeeded to a peerage Replaced by George Ponsonby 1808	Whig; Whig; Whig
Tewkesbury (seat 1/2)	Charles Hanbury Tracy	Whig
Tewkesbury (seat 2/2)	Christopher Bethell Codrington	Tory
Thetford (seat 1/2)	Lord William FitzRoy	
Thetford (seat 2/2)	Thomas Creevey 1807	
Thirsk (seat 1/2)	William Frankland	
Thirsk (seat 2/2)	Robert Greenhill-Russell	Whig
County Tipperary (seat 1/2)	Hon. Montagu James Mathew	Tory
County Tipperary (seat 2/2)	Hon. Francis Aldborough Prittie	Tory
Tiverton (seat 1/2)	William Fitzhugh	Tory
Tiverton (seat 2/2)	Hon. Richard Ryder	Tory
Totnes (seat 1/2)	Benjamin Hall	
Totnes (seat 2/2)	William Adams – died Replaced by Thomas Peregrine Courtenay 1811	
Tralee	Sir Arthur Wellesley – sat for Newport I.o.W. Replaced by Evan Foulkes 1807 – resigned Replaced by James Stephen 1808	Tory; Tory
Tregony (seat 1/2)	Geoffrey Wentworth Wentworth – resigned Replaced by William Gore Langton 1808	Whig
Tregony (seat 2/2)	James O'Callaghan	Whig
Truro (seat 1/2)	Edward Boscawen – succeeded to a peerage Replaced by Charles Frederick Powlett Townshend 1808 – succeeded to a peerage Replaced by William John Bankes 1810	Tory
Truro (seat 2/2)	John Lemon	Whig
County Tyrone (seat 1/2)	Hon. Thomas Knox	
County Tyrone (seat 2/2)	James Stewart	
== W ==
Wallingford (seat 1/2)	William Hughes	Whig
Wallingford (seat 2/2)	Richard Benyon	Tory
Wareham (seat 1/2)	Granby Thomas Calcraft – resigned Replaced by Samuel Romilly 1808	Whig
Wareham (seat 2/2)	Hon. John William Ward	Tory
Warwick (seat 1/2)	Charles Mills	
Warwick (seat 2/2)	Lord Brooke	Tory
Warwickshire (seat 1/2)	Dugdale Stratford Dugdale	
Warwickshire (seat 2/2)	Charles Mordaunt	
Waterford	Sir John Newport, Bt	Tory
County Waterford (seat 1/2)	John Claudius Beresford – resigned Replaced by Sir William Beresford 1811	Tory
County Waterford (seat 2/2)	Richard Power	Tory
Wells (seat 1/2)	Charles William Taylor	Whig
Wells (seat 2/2)	Clement Tudway	
Wendover (seat 1/2)	Viscount Mahon – sat for Kingston upon Hull; Replaced by Francis Horner 1807	Whig; Whig
Wendover (seat 2/2)	George Smith	Whig
Wenlock (seat 1/2)	John Simpson	
Wenlock (seat 2/2)	Cecil Forester	
Weobley (seat 1/2)	Lord George Thynne Lord Guernsey – resigned Replaced by Lord Apsley 1812	
Weobley (seat 2/2)	Lord Guernsey – resigned Replaced by Lord Apsley 1812	
West Looe (seat 1/2)	Ralph Allen Daniell	
West Looe (seat 2/2)	James Buller – took office Replaced by Joseph Sydney Yorke 1812	
Westbury (seat 1/2)	Edward Lascelles – sat for Northallerton; Replaced by Henry Lascelles 1807	
Westbury (seat 2/2)	Glynn Wynn – resigned Replaced by Francis Whittle 1809; Replaced by John de Ponthieu 1810	
County Westmeath (seat 1/2)	William Smyth – resigned Replaced by Hon. Hercules Robert Pakenham 1808	
County Westmeath	Gustavus Hume-Rochfort	
Westminster (seat 1/2)	Francis Burdett	Whig
Westminster (seat 2/2)	Lord Cochrane	Whig
Westmorland (seat 1/2)	James Lowther	Tory
Westmorland (seat 2/2)	The Lord Muncaster	Tory
Wexford	Richard Nevill – resigned Replaced by Peter Parker 1810 – resigned Replaced by Richard Nevill 1811	Tory
County Wexford (seat 1/2)	Abel Ram	Tory
County Wexford (seat 2/2)	William Congreve Alcock	Tory
Weymouth and Melcombe Regis (seat 1/4)	Sir James Pulteney – died Replaced by Sir John Murray 1811	Tory
Weymouth and Melcombe Regis (seat 2/4)	Richard Augustus Tucker Steward	
Weymouth and Melcombe Regis (seat 3/4)	Charles Adams	Tory
Weymouth and Melcombe Regis (seat 4/4)	Gabriel Tucker Steward – resigned Replaced by Sir John Lowther Johnstone 1810; Replaced by Joseph Hume 1812	Tory
Whitchurch (seat 1/2)	William Brodrick	
Whitchurch (seat 2/2)	Hon. William Augustus Townshend	
County Wicklow (seat 1/2)	William Hoare Hume	Tory
County Wicklow (seat 2/2)	William Tighe	Tory
Wigan (seat 1/2)	John Hodson	Tory
Wigan (seat 2/2)	Sir Robert Holt Leigh	Tory
Wigtown Burghs (seat 1/1)	Edward Richard Stewart – took office Replaced by Lyndon Evelyn 1809	
Wigtownshire (seat 1/1)	William Maxwell	
Wilton (seat 1/2)	Ralph Sheldon	
Wilton (seat 2/2)	Captain the Hon. Charles Herbert	
Wiltshire (seat 1/2)	Henry Penruddocke Wyndham	Whig
Wiltshire (seat 2/2)	Richard Godolphin Long	Tory
Winchelsea (seat 1/2)	Sir Frederick Fletcher Vane – resigned Replaced by Sir Oswald Mosley 1807	Whig; Whig
Winchelsea (seat 2/2)	Calverley Bewicke	Whig
Winchester (seat 1/2)	Sir Henry St John-Mildmay, Bt	
Winchester (seat 2/2)	Richard Grace Gamon	
Windsor (seat 1/2)	Edward Disbrowe	Tory
Windsor (seat 2/2)	Richard Ramsbottom – resigned Replaced by John Ramsbottom 1810	Tory
Woodstock (seat 1/2)	Sir Henry Dashwood, Bt	
Woodstock (seat 2/2)	William Frederick Elliot Eden – died Replaced by George Eden 1810	
Wootton Bassett (seat 1/2)	Sir John Murray – resigned Replaced by Robert Knight 1811	Whig
Wootton Bassett (seat 2/2)	John Cheesment Severn – resigned Replaced by Benjamin Walsh 1808 – Expelled; Replaced by John Attersoll 1812	
Worcester (seat 1/2)	William Gordon	Whig
Worcester (seat 2/2)	Abraham Robarts	Whig
Worcestershire (seat 1/2)	William Lyttelton	
Worcestershire (seat 2/2)	William Lygon	
Wycombe (seat 1/2)	Sir Thomas Baring, Bt	
Wycombe (seat 2/2)	Sir John Dashwood-King, Bt	Tory
== Y ==
Yarmouth (Isle of Wight) (seat 1/2)	Jervoise Clarke Jervoise – died Replaced by Benjamin Cooke Griffinhoofe 1808 – resigned Replaced by John Delgarno 1808 – resigned Replaced by Viscount Valentia 1808 – resigned Replaced by Thomas Myers 1810	
Yarmouth (Isle of Wight) (seat 2/2)	Hon. William Orde-Powlett; Replaced by Admiral Sir John Orde	
York (seat 1/2)	Sir William Mordaunt Milner – died Replaced by Lawrence Dundas 1811	Whig
York (seat 2/2)	Sir Mark Masterman-Sykes	Whig
Yorkshire (seat 1/2)	Viscount Milton	Whig
Yorkshire (seat 2/2)	William Wilberforce	Tory
Youghal (seat 1/1)	Viscount Boyle – succeeded to a peerage Replaced by Sir John Keane 1807	Whig; Tory

== By-elections ==
- List of United Kingdom by-elections (1806–18)

== See also ==
- List of parliaments of the United Kingdom
- Unreformed House of Commons
