= Joseph Robertson (priest) =

English clergyman and writer

Joseph Robertson (1726–1802) was an English clergyman and writer.

== Life ==
Born at Knipe, Westmoreland, on 28 August 1726, he was the son of a maltster from a family of Rutter, Appleby. His mother was the only daughter of Edward Stevenson of Knipe, a relative of Edmund Gibson. Robertson was educated at the free school at Appleby, and on 17 March 1746 matriculated from The Queen's College, Oxford. He graduated B.A. on 19 Oct. 1749, and took holy orders about 1752, being appointed curate to Dr. Sykes at Rayleigh, Essex. In 1758 he was presented to the living of Herriard in Hampshire, and married. He became rector of Sutton, Essex, in 1770, and in 1779 vicar of St. Mary's Church, Horncastle, by the gift of his relative Edmund Law.

Robertson died of apoplexy on 19 January 1802, in his seventy-sixth year. His wife, a daughter of Timothy Raikes, chemist, of London, survived him, but his children all died in infancy.

== Works ==
Robertson was a prolific writer with a reputation as a critic. In 1772 he revised for the press Gregory Sharpe's posthumous sermons, and in the same year edited Algernon Sidney's Discourses on Government, at the request of Thomas Hollis. In The Critical Review he contributed over 2,600 articles between 1764 and 1785. He also wrote in the Gentleman's Magazine, and produced a learned work on the authenticity of the Parian Chronicle (London, 1788), which was answered by John Hewlett.

Other works included sermons, a translation of François Fénelon's Les Aventures de Télémaque (1795), and:

- A Letter to Sauxay on the Case of Miss Butterfield, a Young Woman charged with Murder, London, 1775, with Observations on the same, 1776.
- Essay on Culinary Poisons, London, 1781.
- Introduction to the Study of Polite Literature, London, 1782; other editions 1785, 1799, and 1808.
- An Essay on Punctuation, London, 1785; 5th edit. London, 1808; answered by David Steel in Remarks on an Essay, London, 1786.
- Observations on the Act for augmenting the Salaries of Curates, published under the name of Eusebius, Vicar of Lilliput, London, 1797.
- An Essay on the Education of Young Ladies, 1798.
- Essay on the Nature of English Verse, London, 1799; 5th edit., 1808.
