= Francis Horner =

Scottish Whig politician, journalist, lawyer and political economist

Francis Horner FRSE
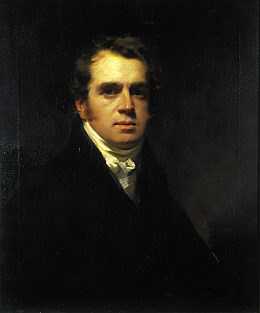
- Francis Horner by Henry Raeburn.

Member of Parliament for St Mawes
- In office 1813–1817

Member of Parliament for Wendover
- In office 1807–1812

Member of Parliament for St Ives
- In office 1806–1807

Personal details
- Born: 12 August 1778 Edinburgh, Scotland
- Died: 8 February 1817 (aged 38) Pisa, Italy
- Resting place: Old English Cemetery, Livorno, Italy.
- Citizenship: United Kingdom of Great Britain and Ireland
- Party: Whig
- Education: University of Edinburgh
- Occupation: Politician and lawyer.

Francis Horner FRSE (12 August 1778 – 8 February 1817) was a Scottish Whig politician, journalist, lawyer and political economist.

== Early life: 1778–1807 ==
He was born in Edinburgh the son of John Horner a linen merchant and his wife Joanna Baillie. The family lived originally on Princes Street then moved to 19 York Place. His younger brother was Leonard Horner. He had another younger brother, John Horner Esq. (1782-1829), and a younger sister, Frances Horner (1789-1876) who married Myles Byrne.

He was educated at the High School in Edinburgh under Dr Alexander Adam. He then spent a year at a private school in Shacklewell near London under John Hewlett.

He then studied law at University of Edinburgh, where he was praised by Professor Dugald Stewart as an intellectual all-rounder. He left the university in 1795 and went with Rev. John Hewlett to Middlesex, where he almost lost his Scottish accent. He was also a member of the Speculative Society (with Henry Brougham) and the Academy of Physics, the Chemical and Literary societies, as well as others. In May 1799 he read Henry Addington's speech in favour of the union with Ireland, and wrote in his journal: "I like, throughout this speech, that familiar acquaintance with the principles and language of the constitution ... which ... awakens all my veneration (some of which may be prejudice) for the ancient Whig politics of England, which are at present so much out of fashion, being hated by both parties". He read David Hume's history in August 1800 and wrote: "The history of Britain, during the eighteenth century, haunts me like a dream; and I am alternately intoxicated with visions of historic laurels and of forensic eminence".

He qualified as an advocate in Scotland in 1800 but after a few years of practice went to London to train for the English bar at Lincoln's Inn and qualified there in 1807.

In 1802, Horner was one of the founders (with Francis Jeffrey) of the Edinburgh Review, and in the next few years he would contribute fourteen articles to that journal. He features as the character Frank the Tinker in John Paterson's Mare, James Hogg's allegorical satire on the Edinburgh publishing scene first published in the Newcastle Magazine in 1825.

Through his involvement with the Edinburgh Review, Horner became acquainted with fellow Whig journalists. In June 1804 he wrote:

... in the general maxims and principles of Mr. Fox's party, both with regard to the doctrine of the constitution, to foreign policy, and to the modes of internal legislation, I recognise those to which I have been led by the results of my own reflection, and by the tenor of my philosophical education. And I am ambitious to co-operate with that party, in labouring to realise those enlightened principles in the government of our own country ... All my feelings carry me towards that party; and all my principles confirm the predilection. Into that party, there, I resolve to enlist myself.

In 1807 he was elected a Fellow of the Royal Society of Edinburgh. His proposers were Sir James Hall, John Playfair and Thomas Allan.

== Political career: 1806–1817 ==
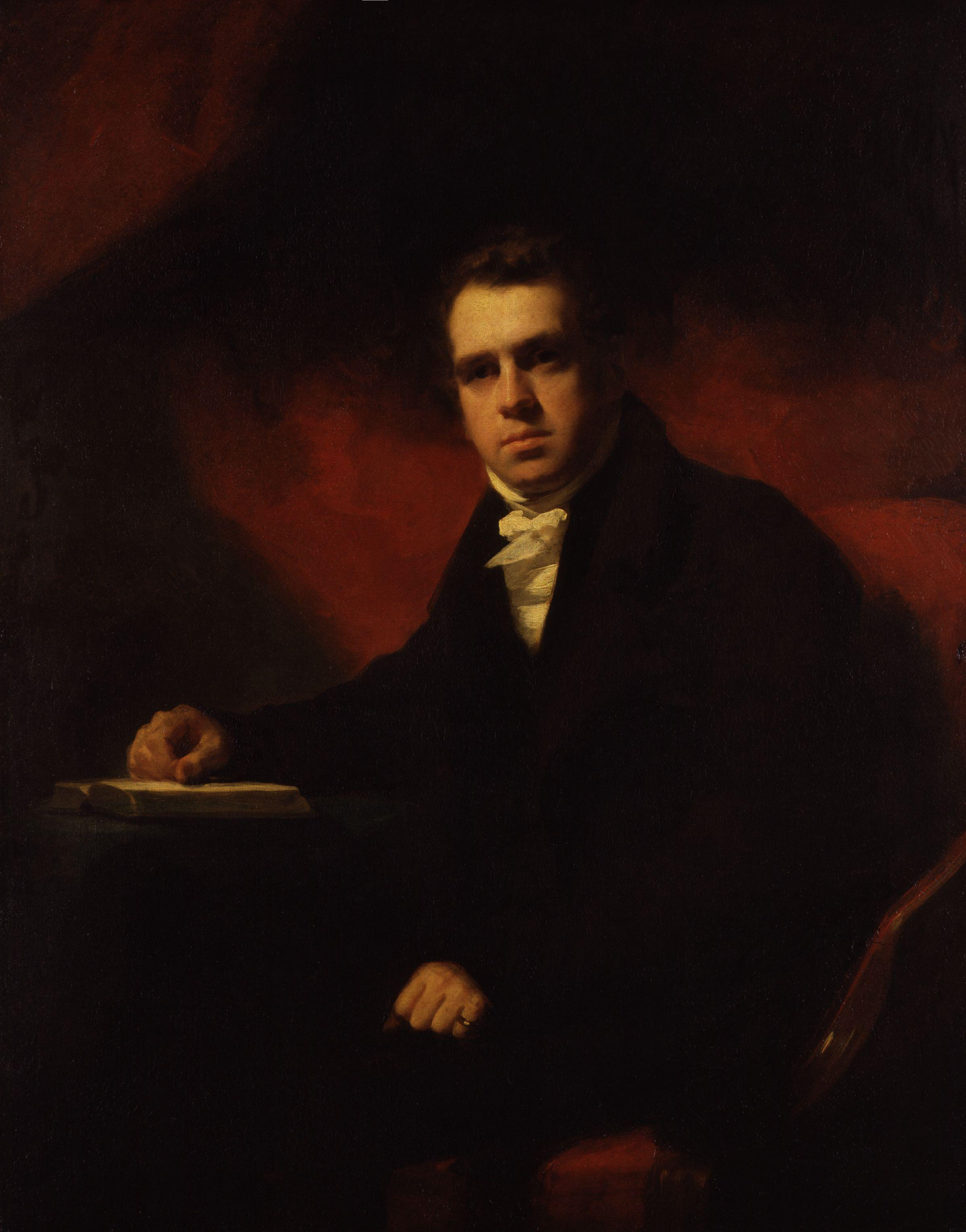
Horner by Sir Henry Raeburn.

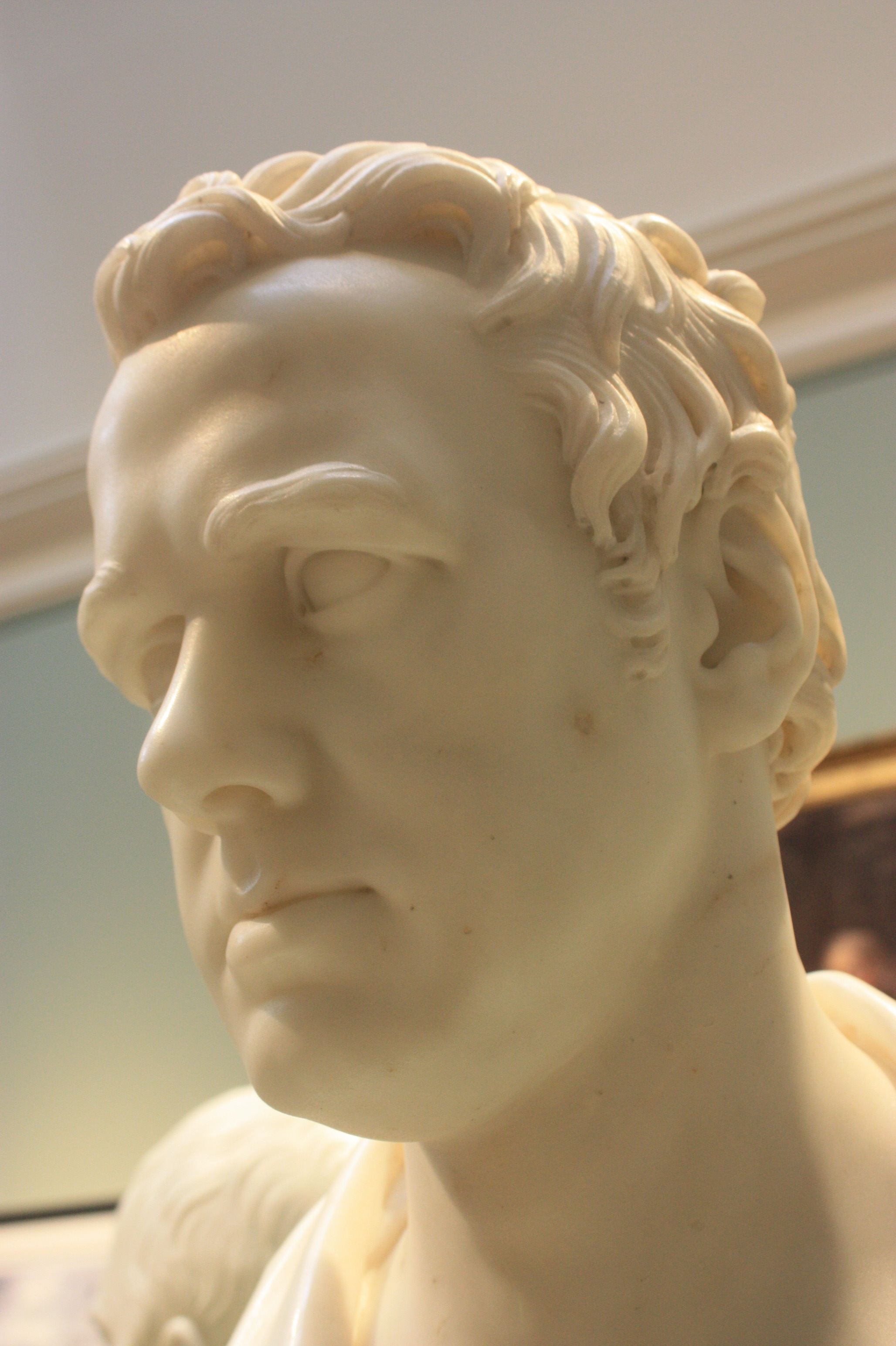
Francis Horner by Sir Francis Chantrey 1818

Horner was MP for St. Ives in 1806, Wendover in 1807, and St. Mawes in 1812 (in the patronage of the Marquess of Buckingham).

He translated Leonhard Euler's Elements of Algebra in 1797 and revised Henry Bennet's Short Account of a late Short Administration for publication in 1807.

Horner was offered a Treasury secretaryship in 1811 when Lord Grenville was attempting to form a ministry, which he refused as he would not accept office until he was wealthy enough to survive out of office. A believer in political economy, he criticised the Corn Laws and slavery in 1813–15. On 20 March 1815 the City of London voted thanks to him for his critique of protectionism.

On 1 February 1810 he moved for a committee on inquiry into the high price of bullion. He subsequently was appointed chairman of the Bullion Committee, where he "extended and confirmed his fame as a political economist by his share in the famous Bullion Report". The committee produced its report on 8 June (but not published until August). On 20 February 1811 Horner advocated the repeal of restrictions on cash payments and on 6 May put forward sixteen resolutions in favour but they were countered on 26 June by government counter-resolutions. Horner believed the two-party system hindered the rational debate of sensible policy solutions which prevented ideas being debated on their merits.

In 1808 he supported the Spanish uprising against Napoleon, writing in July 1808:

Spain! Spain! I am in a fever till I hear more about Dupont and the passes of the Sierra Morena ... the event (either way) will perhaps be the most decisive test of the genius and effects of the French Revolution. The one result would revive our original persuasion, in its first ardour, that the people are not to subdued by foreign troops, unless the love of their country is lost in a contempt of their government. The other would sink me in final despair of ever living to see prosperity or liberty again in any part of Europe.

In January 1811 Horner wrote:

In the situation to which the continent of Europe is reduced, and in the situation which England commands, I cannot imagine a general peace of any duration; and without it, we can have no peace with France ... If the whole Continent were to be tranquillised into one empire, and should slumber for years in repose under a vigilant and well-organised despotism, no fate could be intended for us but annexation to the mass; nor could we devise any safety for ourselves, but by adopting public institutions, and by fostering sentiments of individual ambition and conduct, of which defensive war and the most rigid prejudices of local patriotism were constant objects ... It seems infinitely more probable, that the new empire of France will be perpetually disturbed by efforts in one member or another to throw off the yoke ... I conceive it would be the duty of this country ... to contribute from our resources every aid and encouragement to the insurgents. It is idle to sigh for peace, if it cannot be had upon system, and for a period to be sure of; England forms a part of Europe, and must share its vicissitudes and agitations.

Horner further claimed that the British war policy should be based on "the principles by which Elizabeth was guided, and afterwards King William; forbearing all little bye objects of gain and aggrandisement, and keeping steadily in view, through all fortunes and in the lowest depth of our despair, the ultimate partition of the Continent into independent states, and the revival of a public law in Europe".

After Napoleon's defeat in 1814, he criticised the peace settlement as "the plunder of Europe" by the "robbers of Vienna". After Napoleon escaped from Elba and became ruler of France again, Horner was against the resumption of war and the tax burden needed to pay for it. He also opposed the Bourbon restoration in France and Naples. This led to disagreements with the Grenvillite faction and on 8 April he offered to resign his seat but was persuaded not to by Lord Grenville. On 28 April he voted for Samuel Whitbread's peace motion and again considered resignation but decided not to. After Napoleon's defeat he again opposed a conservative peace settlement, the expensive military establishment and the heavy tax burden that it entailed.

Horner's proposed Bill for regulation grand juries on indictments in Ireland was passed in 1816 and Grand Jury (Ireland) Act 1816 became law. His proposal on 1 May to end the renewal of the Bank Restriction Act 1797 was defeated in the Commons by 146 votes to 73, as was his proposals to authorise cash payments in two years' time.

== Death ==
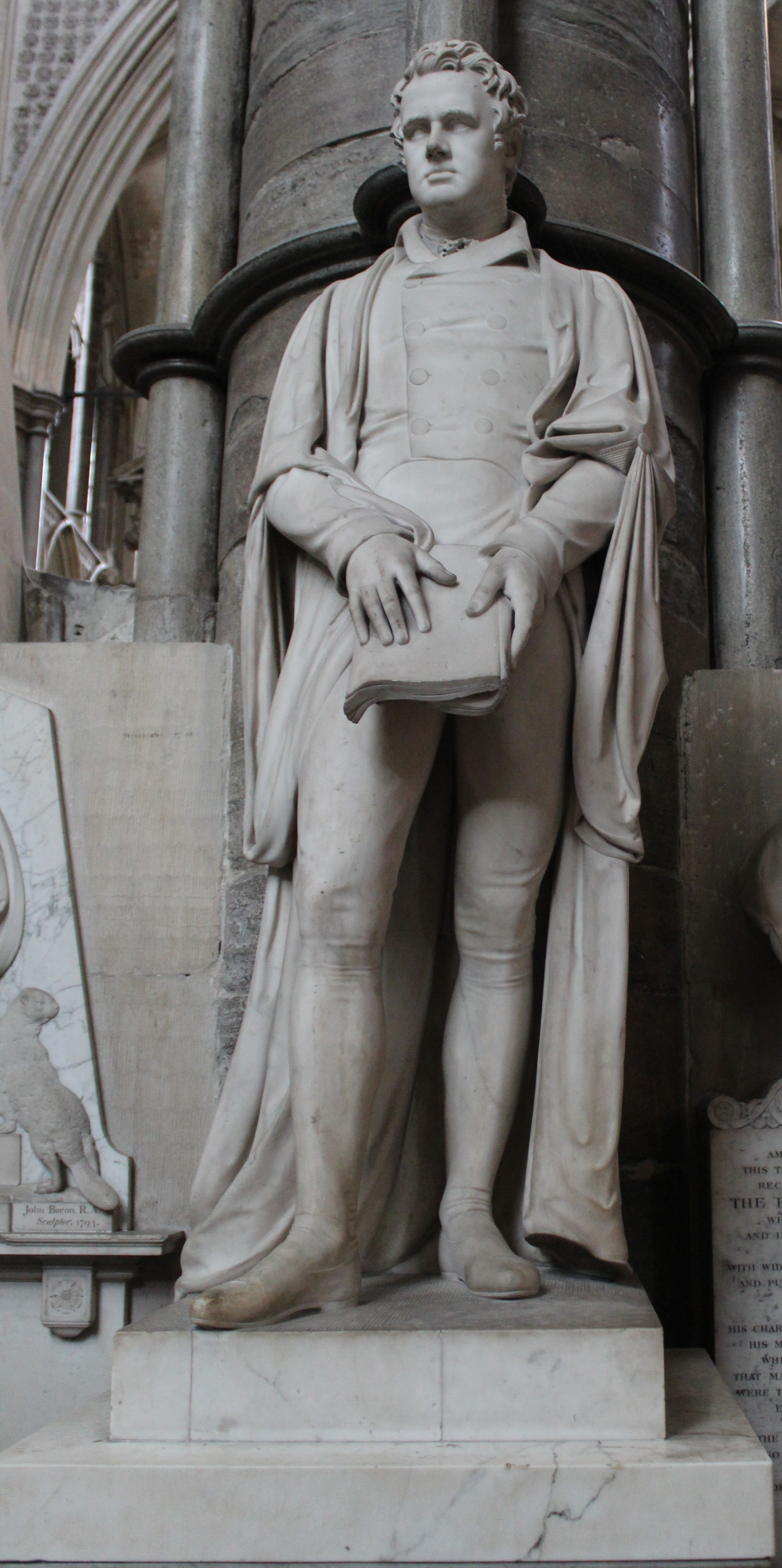
Horner's statue in Westminster Abbey

In October 1816 his physicians advised him to visit Italy due to ill health. He resided in Pisa from December 1816 and died there a few months later. He is buried in the Old English Cemetery at Livorno and has a statue in Westminster Abbey by the sculptor Sir Francis Chantrey.

He never married and had no children.

== Legacy ==
G. F. R. Barker, writing in the Dictionary of National Biography in 1891, gave this assessment of Horner:

Horner was a man of sound judgment and unassuming manners, of scrupulous integrity, and great amiability of character. He was a correct and forcible speaker, and though without the gift of eloquence or humour, exercised a remarkable influence in the House of Commons, owing to his personal character. Few men, with such small advantages at the outset of their career, ever acquired in such a short space of time so great a reputation among their contemporaries. As a political economist Horner ranks deservedly high, and though the bullion report, with which his name is identified, produced no immediate legislative result, its effect upon public opinion was so great that Peel was enabled to pass his bill for the gradual resumption of cash payments by the bank a few years afterwards (59 Geo. III, c. 49). Lord Cockburn, in "Memorials of his Time," has recorded his conviction that "Horner was born to show what moderate powers, unaided by anything whatever except culture and goodness, may achieve, even when these powers are displayed amidst the competition and jealousy of public life" (p. 313), while Scott declared that Horner always put him "in mind of Obadiah's bull" (LOCKHART, Life of Sir Walter Scott, 1845, p. 156).

== Selected works ==
- Horner, Leonard, ed. (1843). Memoirs and Correspondence of Francis Horner, M.P. In Two Volumes. London: John Murray – via HathiTrust.

Parliament of the United Kingdom
| Preceded by Jonathan Raine; William Praed | Member of Parliament for St Ives; 1806–1807; With: Samuel Stephens | Succeeded by Sir Walter Stirling, Bt; Samuel Stephens |
| Preceded by Viscount Mahon; George Smith | Member of Parliament for Wendover; 1807–1812; With: George Smith | Succeeded by Abel Smith; George Smith |
| Preceded by William Shipley; Scrope Bernard-Morland | Member of Parliament for St Mawes; 1813–1817; With: Scrope Bernard-Morland | Succeeded by Joseph Phillimore; Scrope Bernard-Morland |
