= Claude Scott =

English politician (1742–1830)

MP for Malmesbury
- In office 1802–1806

MP for Dungannon
- In office 8 March 1809 – 1812

Personal details
- Born: 11 May 1742
- Died: 27 March 1830 (aged 87)
- Party: Tory
- Children: Samuel Scott (son)

Sir Claude Scott, 1st Baronet (11 May 1742 – 27 March 1830) was an English politician. He was member of parliament for Malmesbury and Dungannon.

== See also ==
- List of MPs elected in the 1802 United Kingdom general election
- List of MPs elected in the 1807 United Kingdom general election
