= Walter Stirling =

Royal Navy captain

Captain Sir Walter Stirling
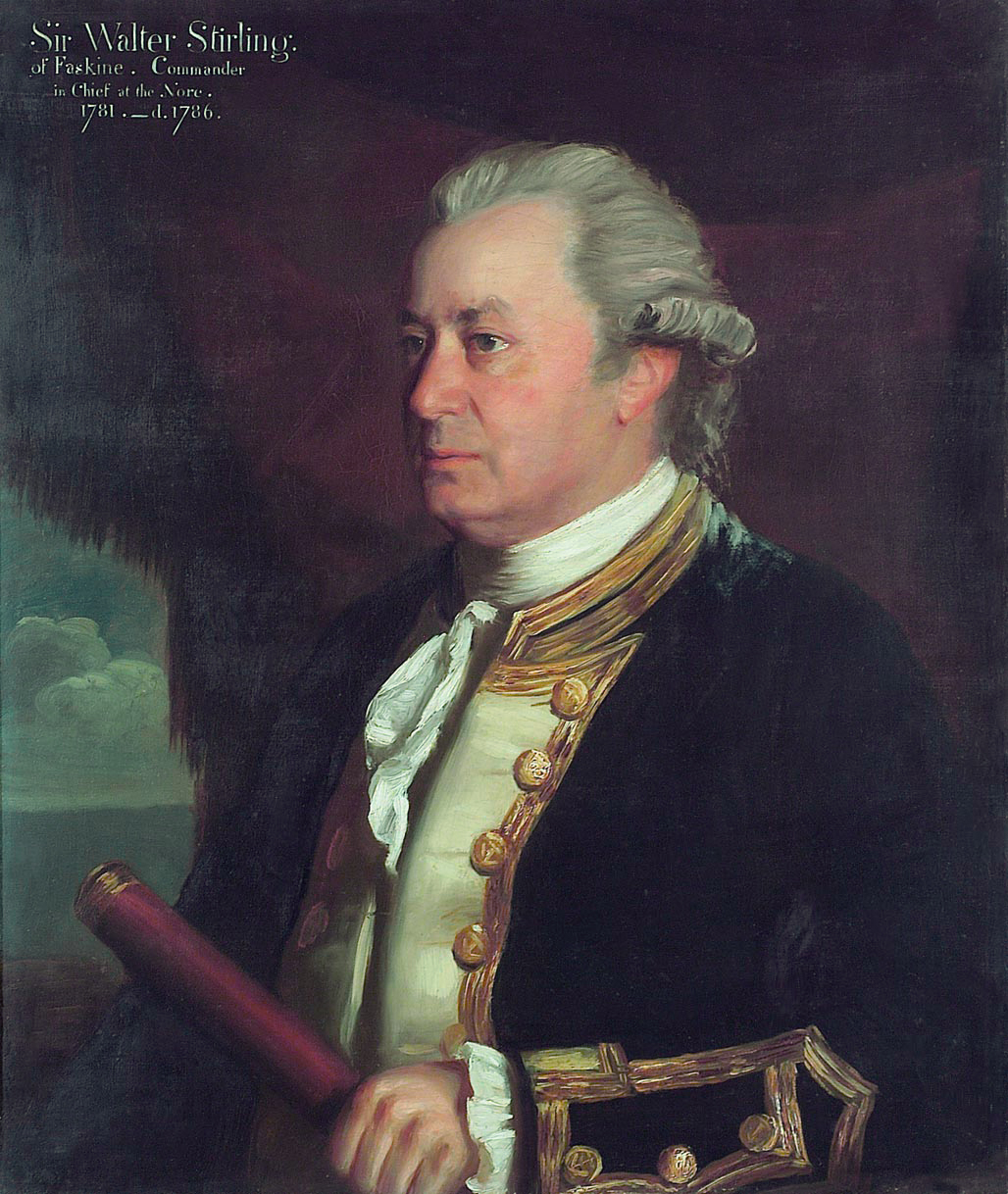
- "Sir Walter Stirling of Faskine, Commander in Chief at the Nore, 1781. - d. 1786" by James Northcote
- Born: 18 May 1718
- Died: 24 November 1786 (aged 68)
- Military career
- Allegiance: Kingdom of Great Britain
- Branch: Royal Navy
- Rank: Captain
- Commands: Nore Command
- Conflicts: Fourth Anglo-Dutch War

Captain Sir Walter Stirling (18 May 1718 – 24 November 1786) was a captain in the Royal Navy.

== Naval career ==
Born in 1718, Walter Stirling entered the Royal Navy. He was made "The Regulating Captain of the Impress at the Tower". On 30 October 1753 he married Dorothy Willing, the daughter of Charles Willing, a Philadelphia merchant. According to family stories, he persuaded the family of Horatio Nelson to let Horatio join the navy, and he lost the opportunity to be appointed Governor of Halifax as he was visiting his wife in Scotland when the offer came in. In 1780 he was captain of the Gibraltar, and was present when Admiral George Rodney captured the island of Sint Eustatius from the Dutch during the Fourth Anglo-Dutch War. Selected to take home dispatches, he was knighted on arrival. In 1783 he appointed Commander-in-Chief, The Nore. When King George III inspected Stirling's ships, he was so impressed that he offered to make Stirling a baronet. Stirling declined, but his eldest son, also named Walter, later claimed the title, becoming Sir Walter Stirling, 1st Baronet of Faskine. He died in London in November 1786. His second surviving son, Charles, became an admiral. A grandson by his daughter Anne was James Stirling, first Governor of Western Australia, and himself an admiral in later life.

== General references ==
- Statham Drew, Pamela (2003). James Stirling: Admiral and Founding Governor of Western Australia. Crawley: UWA Publishing. ISBN 978-1-876268-94-7. LCCN 2003464253. OL 3760974M. Wikidata Q136431983.

Military offices
Preceded by Robert Roddam	Commander-in-Chief, The Nore; 1783–1785	Succeeded by Sir Andrew Hamond
