= William Pole-Tylney-Long-Wellesley, 4th Earl of Mornington =

Anglo-Irish nobleman (1788–1857)

The Right Honourable The Earl of Mornington
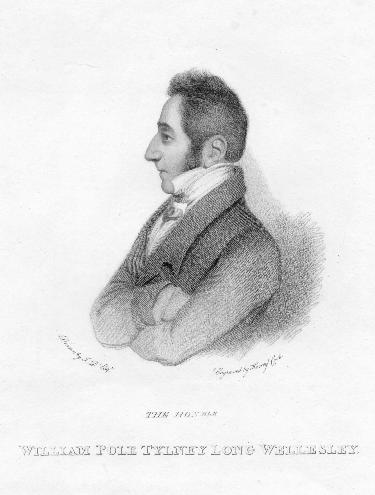
- William Pole-Tylney-Long-Wellesley, c. 1812

Member of Parliament for Essex
- In office 1831–1832

Member of Parliament for St Ives
- In office 1830–1831

Member of Parliament for Wiltshire
- In office 1818–1820

Member of Parliament for St Ives
- In office 1812–1818

Personal details
- Born: William Wesley-Pole; 22 June 1788 London
- Died: 1 July 1857 (aged 69) Thayer Street, Manchester Square, London
- Party: Tory/Ultra-Tory
- Spouses: Catherine Tylney-Long (m. 1812; died 1825) Helena Paterson Bligh (m. 1828)
- Parent(s): William Wellesley-Pole, 3rd Earl of Mornington (father); Katherine Forbes (mother)

William Pole-Tylney-Long-Wellesley, 4th Earl of Mornington (22 June 1788 – 1 July 1857) was an Anglo-Irish nobleman notorious for his dissipated lifestyle.

== Ancestry ==
One of his great-grandfathers was Henry Colley (d.1719) (or Cowley) of Castle Carbery, King's County, Ireland. That family from Rutland, England settled in Ireland tempore Henry VIII, where they were distinguished soldiers and administrators. Henry's sister Elizabeth married Garret (or Gerald) Wesley I of Dangan, Meath, younger son of Valerian Wesley and Ann Cusack (see legacy below). Henry's youngest son by Mary Usher, only daughter of Sir William Usher Kt of Dublin, was Richard Colley (d.1758) who in 1728, on the death without issue of his first cousin Garret Wesley II inherited the Wesley estates with the proviso in the will that he and his heirs should adopt the name and arms of Wesley. He made the necessary formal declaration in 1728 and became known as Richard Wesley. In 1746 he was created 1st Baron Mornington, an ancient barony of the Wesleys. His sister Ann married William Pole of Ballyfin, Queen's County. Mornington married Elizabeth Sale, producing as heir Garret Wesley, 2nd Baron Mornington, who was created in 1760 1st Earl of Mornington in County Meath. In 1759 he married Ann Hill and produced five successful sons; of these, the most prominent are:

- firstly Richard Wesley later Governor General of India and was created 1st Marquess Wellesley
- thirdly Hon. William Wesley (later William Wellesley-Pole, 3rd Earl of Mornington), father of the 4th Earl;
- fifthly Arthur, Duke of Wellington.

William, above, inherited the Pole estates from William Pole (d. 1778) of Ballyfin, the childless brother of his aunt Ann Colley. The will of Pole required the family name to honour the inheritance, here Pole, thus William Wesley became in 1778 William Wesley-Pole. Wesley-Pole, born in 1763, also had an outstanding career, having been an Irish member of parliament for Trim, a Governor of Queen's County, and after the Union of 1800 a Westminster member for that county also, and having served as Chief Secretary for Ireland. He married in 1784 Katherine-Elizabeth, eldest daughter of Hon. John Forbes, Admiral of the Fleet and they had the 4th Earl .

== Early life ==
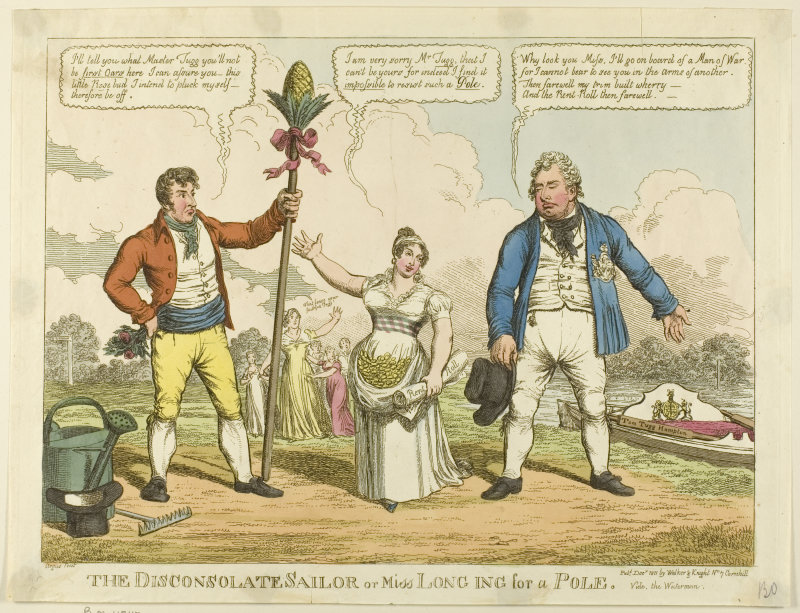
Charles Williams, "The Disconsolate Sailor", 1811 - a cartoon about Catherine's choice between the Duke of Clarence (right) and William Wesley-Pole (left).

He was born William Wesley-Pole on 22 June 1788 in London and baptised at St George's, Hanover Square, on 19 July. His family, quite broadly defined, changed their surname to the more archaic 'Wellesley' in the early 1790s.

His first marriage was on 14 March 1812 to Catherine Tylney-Long, known in fashionable London society as "The Wiltshire Heiress", and believed to be the richest commoner in England. Two months before the ceremony, Wellesley-Pole assumed the additional surnames of Tylney-Long, changing his name by royal licence.

During this period he enjoyed a political career, first as a Tory Member of Parliament for the pocket borough of St Ives from 1812 until 1818, and then for Wiltshire, where his wife's family was influential. However, he was principally known for his dissipation and extravagance. On one occasion in 1814, Long-Wellesley held a grand fête in Wanstead House and its gardens to celebrate his uncle the Duke of Wellington's victory over Napoleon, attended by the Prince Regent, a number of other members of the royal family, and over a thousand dignitaries.

He was a friend of the Irish poet Thomas Moore and of Lord Byron. On 8 August 1822, as his debts began to mount, he was appointed a Gentleman Usher to King George IV, an appointment which rendered him immune to arrest for debt, but he was soon to leave England entirely.

== Second marriage and custody battle ==
While in Europe evading his creditors, Long-Wellesley began a relationship with Helena Paterson Bligh (died 7 April 1869), the wife of Captain Thomas Bligh of the Coldstream Guards, eventually abandoning Catherine, who died two years later on 12 September 1825. Catherine had implied in a letter to her sisters that her husband had given her a venereal disease. Long-Wellesley married Helena in 1828, but this marriage as quickly proved calamitous.

As a notorious rake he was unable to afford to make prudent investments in his first wife's property, but nor could he sell or mortgage it, having only a life interest in it (enjoying its income). As life tenant, he arranged with other beneficiaries for the demolition and carving up of Wanstead House's estate, the proceeds of which repaid some of his great debts.

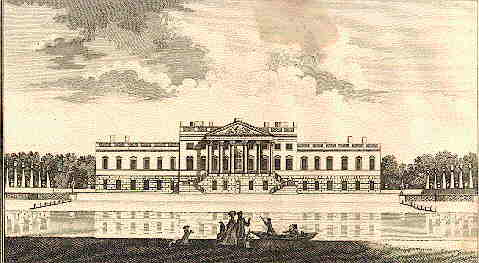
Wanstead House, London Borough of Redbridge.

He returned to Parliament in 1830, again as a member (MP) for St Ives. He was one of the Tories who broke with the first his uncle's Ministry and brought about its fall on 15 November 1830. He was returned and as a knight of the shire (MP) for Essex (in which lay Wanstead) from 1831 to 1832.

In the years following Catherine's death, he sought to regain control over his children, who were in the care of Catherine's two unmarried sisters, Dorothy and Emma. He was especially interested in William, the eldest, on whom Catherine's fortune had devolved. His uncle, the Duke, fighting one of his furious defensive actions, intervened on behalf of the children to keep the hapless William from his father.

Deprived of the custody of his children by the Court of Chancery, he was committed to the Fleet prison by Lord Brougham in July 1831 for contempt of court; Long-Wellesley invoked parliamentary privilege, but his plea was rejected by the committee of privileges of the House of Commons.

For some time he was in and out of court on charges of libel, and various other matters relating to his quest for custody of his children.

== Decline and death ==
He led a very dissipated life and lived for a time in Brussels to avoid his creditors. In his last years, he lived on a small pension of £10 a week allowed by his cousin Arthur Wellesley, 2nd Duke of Wellington. From 1842 he was styled Viscount Wellesley, and succeeded his father as Earl of Mornington in 1845.

He died in lodgings in Thayer Street, Manchester Square, London, on 1 July 1857, from heart disease. The obituary notice three days later in the Morning Chronicle claimed that he was "A spendthrift, a profligate, and a gambler in his youth, he became debauched in his manhood... redeemed by no single virtue, adorned by no single grace, his life gone out even without a flicker of repentance". His coffin is in Catacomb B, Kensal Green Cemetery, London.

== Arms ==
Coat of arms of Pole-Tylney-Long-Wellesley
Coronet Earl's coronet Crest 1st, Out of a ducal coronet Or, a demi-lion rampant Gules, holding in the paws a forked pennon Argent, flowing to the sinister, charged with the cross of St. George, and the ends Gules (Wellesley); 2nd, On a wreath of the colours a lion's head couped Argent, in the mouth a sinister human hand erased at the wrist Proper, charged (for distinction) on the neck with a cross crosslet Gules; 3rd and within a ducal coronet Or, a lion sejant Argent, charged (for distinction) on the shoulder with a torteau (Long); 4th, Out of a ducal coronet Or, a gryphon's head Gules, armed of the First, issuant from the leaves Argent and Azure (Tylney); 5th, A lion's jamb erect Gules (Pole) Escutcheon Quarterly of four, 1st: Gules, a cross argent, between four saltires of plates (Wellesley); 2nd: Sable, semée of cross crosslets Argent, a lion rampant of the Last and (for distinction) a canton ermine (Long); 3rd: Argent, a chevron between gryphons heads erased Gules, armed or, and (for distinction) a canton Gules (Tylney); 4th: Azure, semée of fleurs-de-lis Or, and a lion rampant Argent (Pole). Supporters Two lions Gules, ducally gorged and chained Or, and charged on the shoulder with a crescent Argent Motto Pollet virtus (Virtue prevails)

Parliament of the United Kingdom
Preceded by Samuel Stephens; Sir Walter Stirling, Bt	Member of Parliament for St Ives; 1812–1818; With: Sir Walter Stirling, Bt	Succeeded by Sir Walter Stirling, Bt; Samuel Stephens
Preceded by Richard Godolphin Long; Paul Methuen	Member of Parliament for Wiltshire; 1818–1820; With: Paul Methuen 1818–1819; John Benett 1819–1820	Succeeded by John Benett; John Dugdale Astley
Preceded by James Halse; Charles Arbuthnot	Member of Parliament for St Ives; 1830–1831; With: James Morrison	Succeeded by James Halse; Edward Bulwer-Lytton
Preceded by Charles Western; Sir John Tyssen Tyrell	Member of Parliament for Essex; 1831 – 1832; With: Charles Western	Constituency divided
Peerage of Ireland
Preceded by William Wellesley-Pole	Earl of Mornington; 1845–1857	Succeeded by William Pole-Tylney-Long-Wellesley
Peerage of the United Kingdom
Preceded by William Wellesley-Pole	Baron Maryborough; 1845–1857	Succeeded by William Pole-Tylney-Long-Wellesley
