= Battle of Barren Hill =

Minor battle of the American Revolutionary War

Coordinates: 40.08416°N 75.25076°W

- Part of the American Revolutionary War
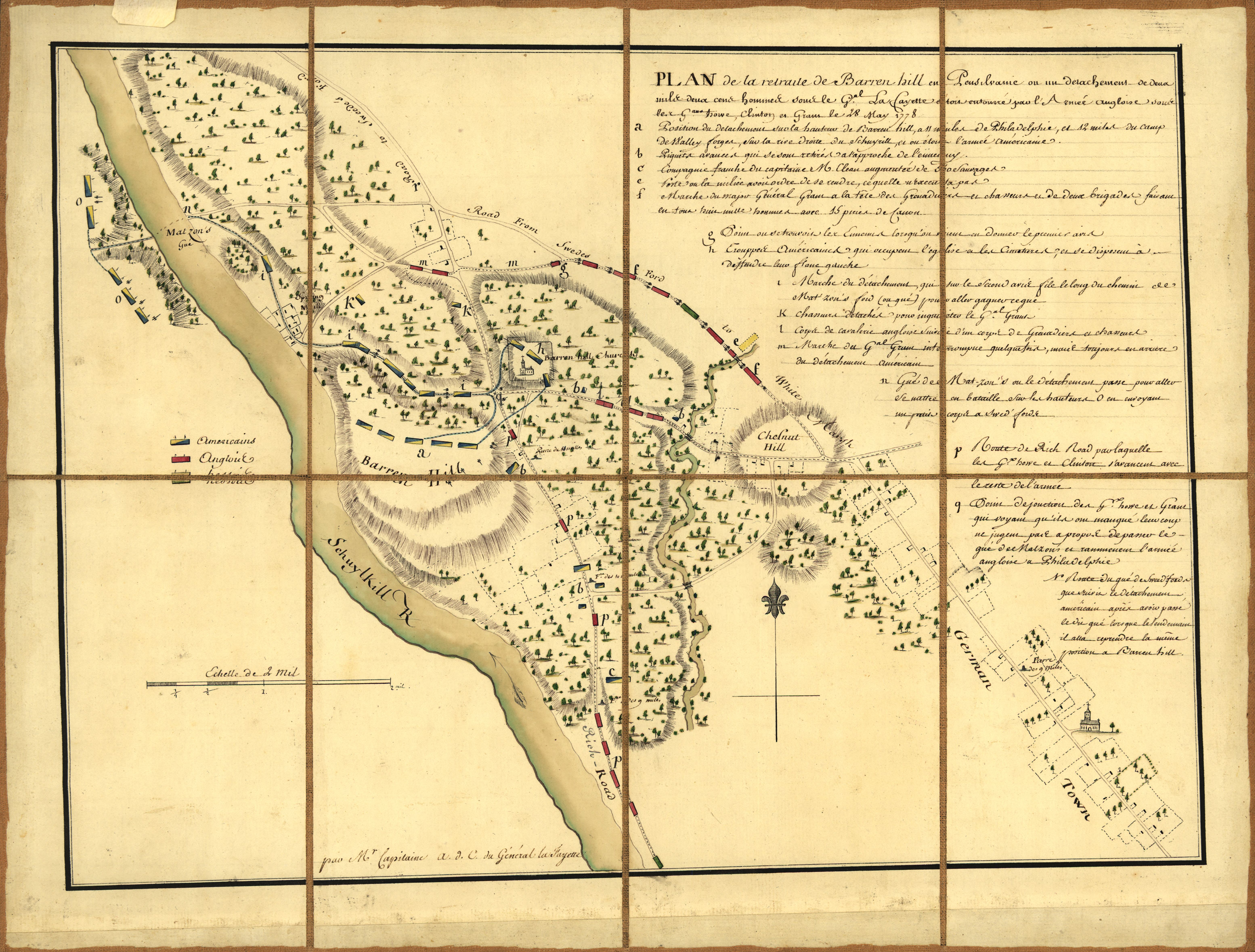
- Map representing the Battle of Barren Hill
Date	May 20, 1778
Location	Barren Hill, (Present-day Lafayette Hill, Pennsylvania)
Result	British victory

Belligerents
United States Oneida	Great Britain; Hesse-Kassel

Commanders and leaders
(United States) Marquis de La Fayette	(Kingdom of Great Britain) Sir William Howe (Kingdom of Great Britain) Sir Henry Clinton (Kingdom of Great Britain) Charles Grey (Kingdom of Great Britain) James Grant

Strength
2,400 troops 5 guns	16,000 troops

Casualties and losses
3 killed	9–30

The Battle of Barren Hill was a minor engagement during the American Revolution. On May 20, 1778, a British Army force attempted to encircle a smaller Continental Army force then under the command of Marquis de Lafayette. The maneuver failed, and the Continental Army escaped the trap but the British took the field.

== Prelude ==
Contemplating the contingency of an early withdrawal by the British from the occupied American Revolutionary capital of Philadelphia, Washington sent Lafayette to Barren Hill, located roughly halfway between Valley Forge and Philadelphia in Pennsylvania, to reconnoiter British intentions and interdict British detachments foraging for food in the surrounding countryside.

On May 18, Lafayette left the Valley Forge camp with 2,400 troops and five pieces of artillery. After crossing the Schuylkill River and turning south, he took up position at Barren Hill, which was close to Matson's Ford. A brigade and the guns were posted on the high ground, near a church, facing south. Another posting was at the Ridge Road to the south, and the Pennsylvania militia was sent to guard the road that led west from White Marsh. The British quickly discovered that the American force was nearby and decided to attack.

On May 19, 1778, around 10:30 p.m., Maj. Gen. James Grant and a 5,000-man British force, including 15 guns, was sent toward Barren Hill. The plan was to take a circuitous route leading to the junction of White Marsh Road and Ridge Road. This would cut off any avenue of retreat for the Americans. A body of 2,000 grenadiers and dragoons would then move along Lafayette's left flank while another group would move into position on the American right. The plan would result in the American position being encircled from 3 positions, trapping them against the river. The British force was to wait until morning to attack and destroy or capture the entire American force.

== Battle ==
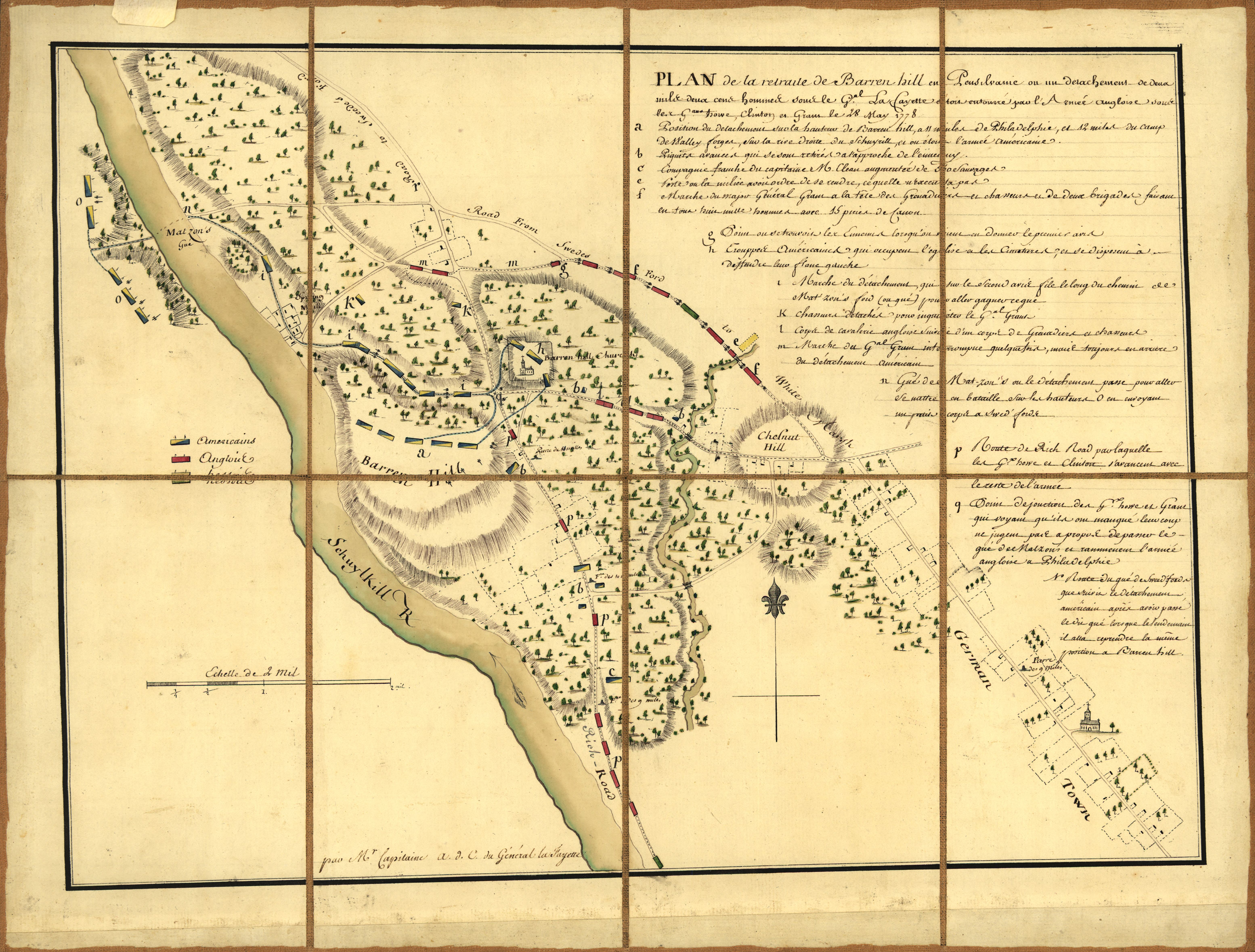
Map of the Revolutionary War Battle of Barren Hill in Pennsylvania

On May 20, 1778, the British launched their attack. The militia scattered at the sight of the British troops, not offering any resistance and failing to notify Lafayette of the attack. On Ridge Road, the American group learned of the British attack. A small group was sent to fight a delaying action against the British while their commander sent word to Lafayette about the developments. After Lafayette learned of the attack, another patriot came up and told him that the British had advanced up the White Marsh Road.

Lafayette knew of another small road that led back to Matson Ford that would bypass the British force. It ran along some low ground that would conceal the Americans from the British. The British did not know about this road. Lafayette ordered his men to retreat down this road while ordering a rear guard to delay the British at the church. A few small patrols were sent to engage the British, skirmishing including the Oneida, making them think that the American force intended to stay and fight. Lafayette calmed his retreating force and slipped away with relatively few casualties.

== Aftermath ==
On June 18, 1778, the British army evacuated Philadelphia, marching towards the Jersey shore where naval transports would ferry them to New York. Washington's army shadowed Clinton on his withdrawal, and then engaged the British in the Battle at Monmouth on June 28, 1778, the Revolutionary War's last major battle in the North.

While there is no official record of the casualties suffered by the Oneida, church records from Saint Peter's Church in Barren Hill indicate that six were buried. One such casualty was Thomas Sinavis, a sachem of the Oneida.

== Notes ==
See report of Gen Lafayette's action at Barren Hill in the Washington Papers Gen Washington at Valley Forge, May 29, 1778 To GOUVERNEUR MORRIS
