= William Gordon, Lord Strathnaver =

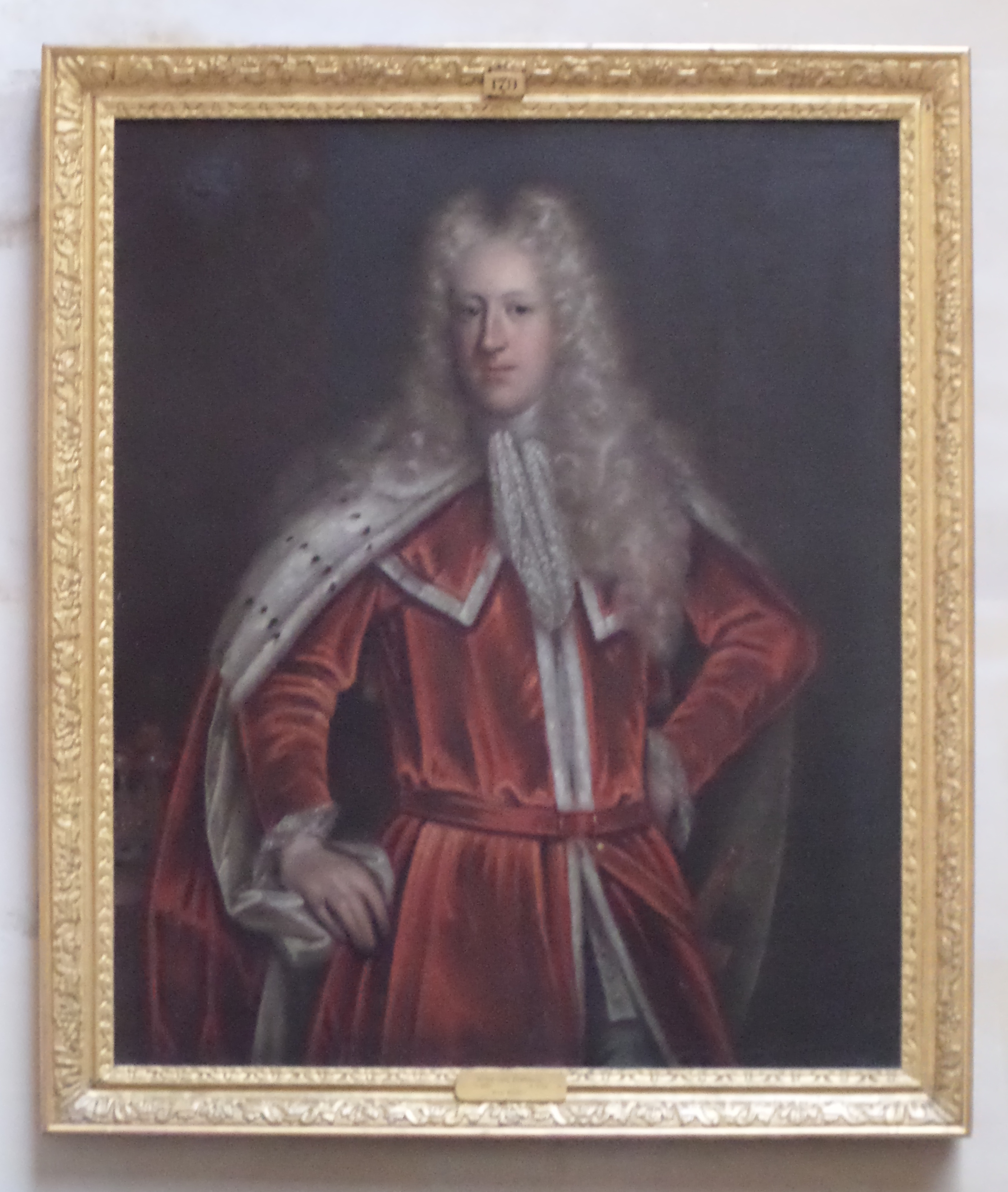
William Gordon, Lord Strathnaver. Displayed in Dunrobin Castle in Sutherland, Scotland.

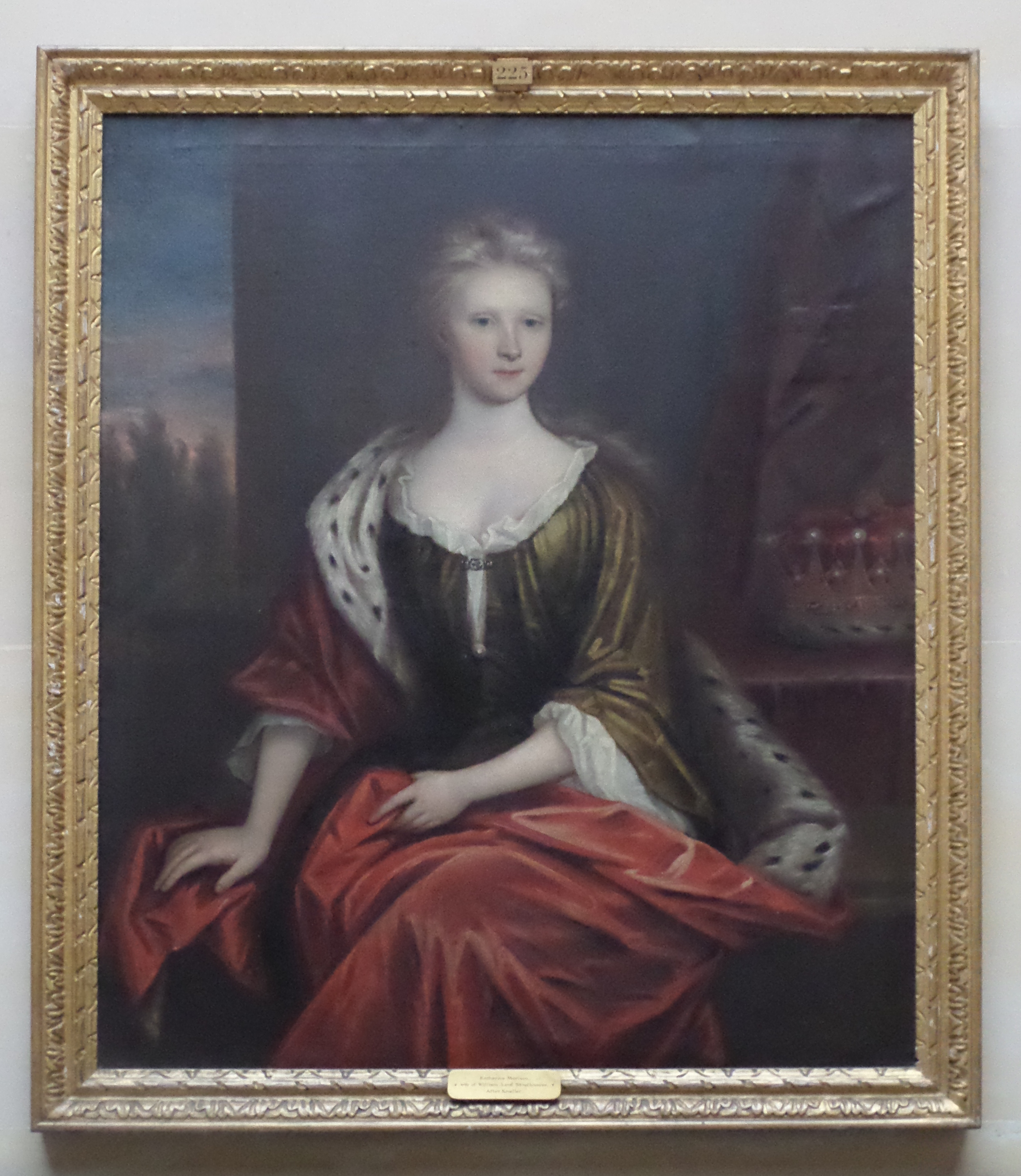
Katherine Morison, wife of Lord Strathnaver. Displayed in Dunrobin Castle in Sutherland, Scotland.

William Gordon (19 December 1683 – 13 July 1720), known by the courtesy title of Lord Strathnaver from 4 March 1703, was a Scottish politician who sat briefly in the British House of Commons in 1708 until he was declared ineligible, being the eldest son of a Scottish peer. In 1719, the family name was changed to Sutherland, when his father was recognised as the Chief of Clan Sutherland.

== Early life ==
Lord Strathnaver was the eldest son of John Gordon, 16th Earl of Sutherland and his first wife Helen Cochrane, daughter of William Cochrane, Lord Cochrane. He joined the army in 1702 and was a Colonel of Foot. By this time the effects of his heavy drinking were apparent. He married, with 60,000 merks, under a contract dated 9 October 1705, Katharine Morison, daughter of William Morison MP. His father then gave him responsibility for the Sutherland estate and thereby, the family’s electoral interest.

== Parliamentary career ==
Strathnaver was returned in a contest at the 1708 British general election as the first Member of Parliament for Tain Burghs. His election, and that of a number of other heirs to Scottish peerages, was contested. Before the Act of Union 1707, the eldest sons of peers were ineligible to be elected to the Parliament of Scotland. No such restriction existed for the Parliament of England. The question arose whether the eldest sons of Scottish peers could be elected to the Parliament of Great Britain, after the Union.

After the House called in counsel, the election petitions and representations in writing were read out and the lawyers put forward arguments for their clients. After counsel had withdrawn, a question was formulated and put to a vote. The proposition the House voted on was "that the eldest sons of the Peers of Scotland were capable by the Laws of Scotland at the time of the Union, to elect or be elected as Commissioners for the Shire or Boroughs [sic, see Burghs] to the Parliament of Scotland; and therefore by the Treaty of Union are capable to elect, or be elected to represent any Shire or Borough [sic] in Scotland, to sit in the House of Commons of Great Britain".

On 3 December 1708, the House of Commons decided the issue, as at that time the House judged the eligibility of its members itself rather than leaving the issue to be decided by a Judge, and rejected the motion. Lord Strathnaver was declared ineligible to be elected an MP for Tain Burghs and vacated the seat.

== Later life ==
In October 1708 Strathnaver went with his regiment to Flanders. As the oldest colonel then in service, he sought promotion from the Duke of Marlborough and his father also interceded on his behalf. However nothing transpired and in June 1710 he sold his command in a fit of pique. He remained an active supporter of the Whigs and assisted the return of Whig candidates in 1710 and 1713. He was appointed admiral depute and bailie depute for the regality of Sutherland by 1711 and became Chamberlain of Ross in 1715. He took command of a regiment of Sutherland clansmen to resist the Jacobite rising of 1715. General Wade's report on the Highlands in 1724, estimated the number of men to bear arms by "Lord Sutherland and Strathnaver" to be 1000. For his efforts, his father obtained for Strathnaver a pension of £500 a year, but it was not approved until 1717, when he received a grant of £1,250 from royal bounty to make up the arrears. Strathnaver became sheriff of Inverness in 1718. In 1719 he became active again in organizing resistance to a threatened Jacobite invasion.

== Death and legacy ==
Lord Strathnaver fell ill from consumption in 1719, and died before his father on 13 July 1720. He had eight sons of whom four survived. His eldest son survived him by only a few months, and the second son, William, eventually succeeded to the peerage. His widow died in 1765.

Parliament of Great Britain
New constituency Act of Union	Member of Parliament for Tain Burghs; 1708–1709	Succeeded by Robert Douglas
