= William Dundas =

Scottish politician (1762–1845)

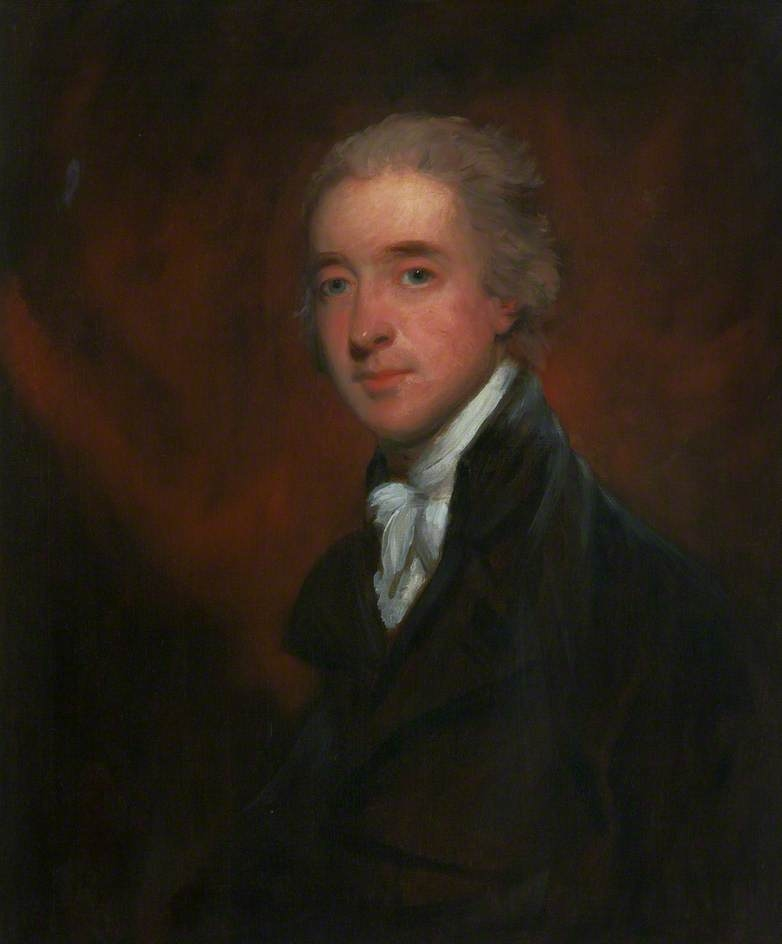
- Portrait by John Hoppner

Personal details
- Born: 1762 Scotland
- Died: 14 November 1845 Edinburgh, Scotland

William Dundas (1762 – 14 November 1845) was a Scottish politician.

The son of Robert Dundas, of Arniston, the younger, he became a barrister at Lincoln's Inn in 1788. He was a member of parliament (MP) for the Anstruther Burghs from 1794 to 1796, for the Northern Burghs from 1796 to 1802, for Sutherland in 1802 and 1806, for Cullen in 1810 and Edinburgh from 1812 to 1831.

He was appointed a Privy Counsellor in 1800 and was Secretary at War from 1804 to 1806. He was a Lord Commissioner of the Admiralty in 1812. He was appointed Keeper of the Signet in 1814, and Lord Clerk Register in 1821

Parliament of Great Britain
Preceded by Robert Anstruther	Member of Parliament for Anstruther Burghs; 1794–1796	Succeeded by John Anstruther
Preceded by Sir Charles Lockhart-Ross, Bt.	Member of Parliament for Northern Burghs; 1796–1801	Succeeded by Parliament of the United Kingdom
Parliament of the United Kingdom
Preceded by Parliament of Great Britain	Member of Parliament for Northern Burghs; 1801–1802	Succeeded by John Charles Villiers
Preceded by James Grant	Member of Parliament for Sutherland; 1802–1808	Succeeded by John Randoll Mackenzie
Preceded by Archibald Campbell Colquhoun	Member of Parliament for Elgin Burghs; 1810–1812	Succeeded by Archibald Campbell
Preceded by Sir Patrick Murray	Member of Parliament for Edinburgh; 1812–1831	Succeeded by Robert Adam Dundas
Political offices
Preceded by Charles Bragge	Secretary at War; 1804–1806	Succeeded by Richard Fitzpatrick
Preceded by Archibald Colquhoun	Lord Clerk Register; 1821–1841	Succeeded by The Earl of Dalhousie
