= Lyndon Evelyn =

Lyndon Evelyn (c. 1759 – 30 April 1839) was a Tory Member of Parliament (MP) in the British Parliament.

He represented the Scottish constituency of Wigtown Burghs 1809–1812, Dundalk in Ireland 1813-1818 and St Ives in Cornwall 1820–1826.

Parliament of the United Kingdom
Preceded by Edward Richard Stewart	Member of Parliament for Wigtown Burghs; 1809–1812	Succeeded by James Henry Keith Stewart
Preceded by John Metge	Member of Parliament for Dundalk; 1813–1818	Succeeded by Gerrard Callaghan
Preceded by Samuel Stephens and Sir Walter Stirling	Member of Parliament for St Ives; 1820–1826; With: James Graham to 1821; Sir Christopher Hawkins, Bt from 1821	Succeeded by Sir Christopher Hawkins, Bt and James Halse
