= Knipe =

Knipe may refer to:

Surname:

- Alden Knipe, football coach
- Humphry Knipe, author
- Joseph F. Knipe, brigadier general
- Alan Knipe, volleyball coach
- Dan Knipe, Founder Of Kilter Finance

Place:

- De Knipe, village in Heerenveen in the province Friesland of the Netherlands
