= William Fremantle (politician) =

British politician and Court official

The Right Honourable Sir William Henry Fremantle GCH

Treasurer of the Household
- In office 27 May 1826 – 17 July 1837
- Monarchs: George IV, William IV, Victoria
- Prime Minister: Liverpool, Canning, Goderich, Wellington, Grey, Melbourne, Peel
- Preceded by: Lord Charles Bentinck
- Succeeded by: Earl of Surrey

Personal details
- Born: 28 December 1766
- Died: 19 October 1850 (aged 83)
- Spouse: Selina Mary Elwell (m. 1797; died 1841)

Sir William Henry Fremantle, GCH, PC (28 December 1766 – 19 October 1850) was a British courtier and politician. He served as Treasurer of the Household from 1826 to 1837.

== Background ==
Fremantle was the son of John Fremantle, of Aston Abbots, Buckinghamshire, by his wife Frances Edwards, daughter of John Edwards, of Bristol. He was the brother of Sir Thomas Fremantle and the uncle of Thomas Fremantle, 1st Baron Cottesloe, and Sir Charles Fremantle.

== Political career ==
Fremantle began his parliamentary career by being elected member of parliament for the Irish borough of Enniskillen at a by-election on 31 July 1806. He represented the seat until the dissolution of Parliament on 24 October 1806. He served under Lord Grenville as Junior Secretary to the Treasury between 1806 and 1807. He stood for Saltash in November 1806, was initially defeated but returned on petition in February 1807. He stood for Saltash once again in May 1807 alongside his brother Thomas. This time there was a double return and in February 1808 Fremantle was declared not elected. In May 1808 he was successfully returned for Tain Burghs, a seat he held until 1812, and then represented Buckingham until 1827. He was sworn of the Privy Council in 1822. In 1826 he was appointed Treasurer of the Household, which he remained until 1837. He was also Ranger of Windsor Great Park.

== Personal life ==
Fremantle married Selina Mary Elwell, daughter of Sir John Elwell, 4th Baronet, and widow of Felton Lionel Hervey, in 1797. She died in November 1841. Fremantle died in October 1850, aged 83. Following the death of his brother, Stephen, he acted as a proxy father to his nephew, John Fremantle who went on to fight in the Peninsular War and at Waterloo.

Parliament of the United Kingdom
Preceded by John King	Member of Parliament for Enniskillen; July–October 1806	Succeeded by Nathaniel Sneyd
Preceded by Matthew Russell; Arthur Champernowne	Member of Parliament for Saltash; February–May 1807; With: Richard Neville	Succeeded by Matthew Russell; John Pedley
Preceded by John Mackenzie	Member of Parliament for the Tain Burghs; 1808–1812	Succeeded by Sir Hugh Innes, Bt
Preceded by Richard Neville; Lord George Grenville	Member of Parliament for Buckingham; 1812–1827; With: Viscount Ebrington 1812–1817; James Stanhope 1817–1818; Sir George Nugent, Bt 1818–1827	Succeeded by Sir George Nugent, Bt; Sir Thomas Fremantle, Bt
Political offices
Preceded by John King	Junior Secretary to the Treasury; 1806–1807	Succeeded by William Huskisson
Preceded by Lord Charles Bentinck	Treasurer of the Household; 1826–1837	Succeeded by Earl of Surrey
