= Parian Chronicle =

Greek chronology inscribed on a stele

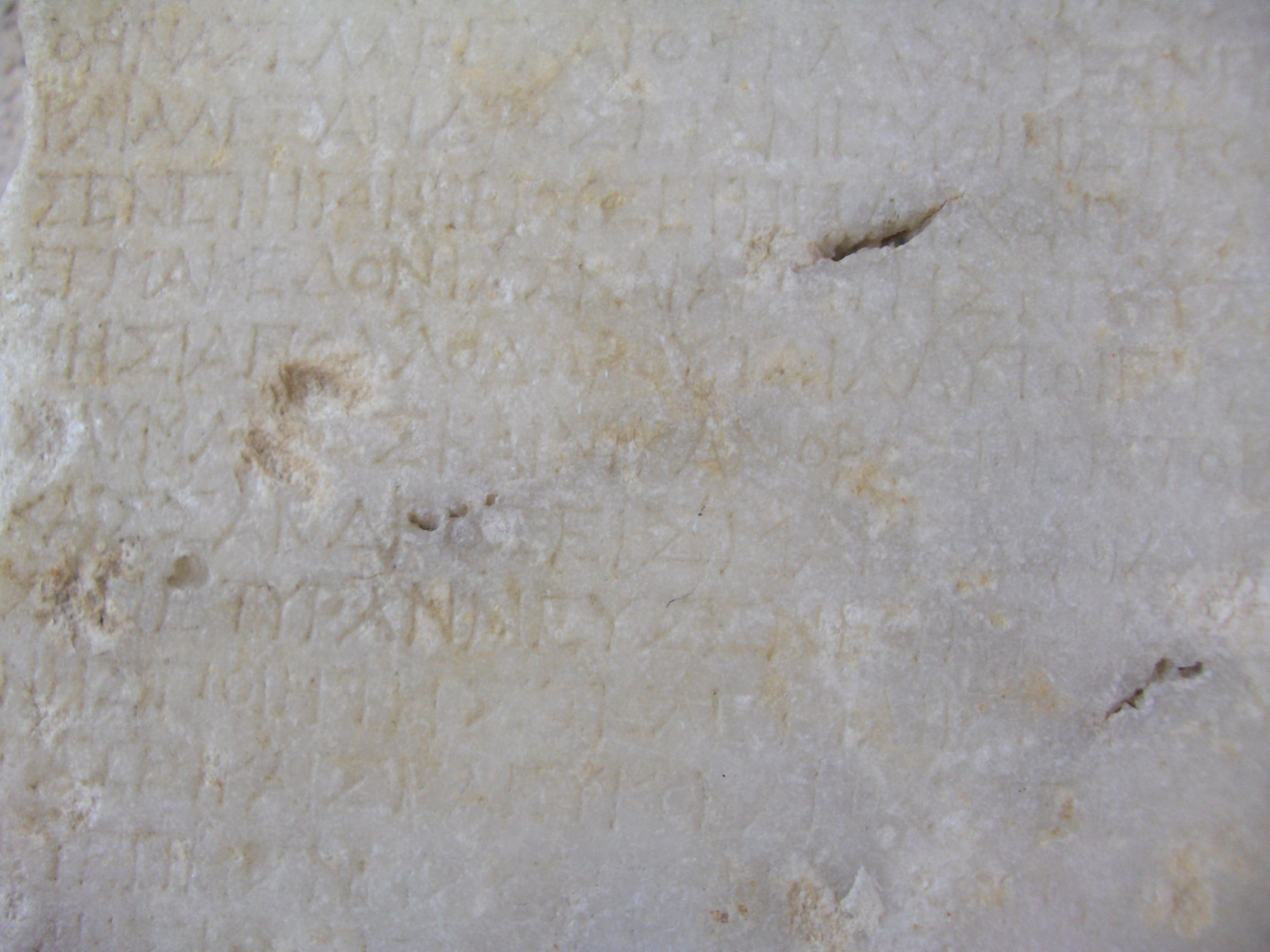
Detail from the shorter fragment base of the stele, found in 1897, that is in a museum on Paros. It contains chronicle entries for the years 336–299 BC.

The Parian Chronicle or Parian Marble (Latin: Marmor Parium, abbr. Mar. Par.) is a Greek chronology, covering the years from 1582 BC to 299 BC, inscribed on a stele. Found on the island of Paros in two sections, and sold in Smyrna in the early 17th century to an agent for Thomas Howard, Earl of Arundel, this inscription was deciphered by John Selden and published among the Arundel Marbles, Marmora Arundelliana (London 1628–9) nos. 1–14, 59–119. The first of the sections published by Selden has subsequently disappeared. A further third fragment of this inscription, comprising the base of the stele and containing the end of the text, was found on Paros in 1897. It has entries from 336/35 to 299/98 BC.

The two known upper fragments, brought to London in 1627 and presented to Oxford University in 1667, include entries for the years 1582/81–355/54 BC. The surviving upper chronicle fragment currently resides in the Ashmolean Museum at Oxford. It combines dates for events which modern readers would consider mythic, such as the Flood of Deucalion (equivalent to 1529/28 BC) with dates we would categorize as historic. For the Greeks, the events of their distant past, such as the Trojan War (dated from 1217 to 1208 BC in the Parian inscription) and the Voyage of the Argonauts were historic: their myths were understood as legends to the Greeks. In fact the Parian inscriptions spend more detail on the Heroic Age than on certifiably historic events closer to the date the stele was inscribed and erected, apparently during 264/263 BC. "The Parian Marble uses chronological specificity as a guarantee of truth," Peter Green observed in the introduction to his annotated translation of the Argonautica of Apollonios Rhodios: "the mythic past was rooted in historical time, its legends treated as fact, its heroic protagonists seen as links between the 'age of origins' and the mortal, everyday world that succeeded it."

The shorter fragment base of the stele, found in 1897, is in the Archaeological Museum of Paros. It contains chronicle entries for the years 336/35–299/98 BC.

== Sources of the Parian Chronicle ==
The major analysis of the Parian Chronicle is that of Felix Jacoby, written in the early 20th century. This appeared in two works: his book Das Marmor Parium published in 1904, and as a part of the Fragmente der griechischen Historiker, first published in 1929. There has been no major study devoted to the entire stele since that time, although a few authors have dealt with specific time periods covered in the tablet. Furthermore, there apparently have been no critical studies of the original text on the stele itself since the work of Jacoby, as evidenced by the fact that the display of the Greek text on the Ashmolean Web site is a photocopy of the text that Jacoby published in his Fragmente.

The legibility of the Oxford fragment was impaired in the late 1980s when it was apparently mechanically cleaned by a crew hired to pressure clean all the classical sculptures in that hall of the Ashmolean. Until then, some of the most badly abraded letters could still be read because they preserved a yellow patina acquired many centuries ago. After the cleaning however the stone was restored to a brilliant white color and the old patina was lost. The controversy in Oxford was such that the Ashmolean issued a statement denying responsibility for the seemingly new appearance of the stone.

In attempting to discern the source or sources of the Chronicle, Jacoby followed the rather subjective method that was popular in the late 19th and early 20th century, whereby a change in the subject matter or style of writing was taken to imply a different source. The style of the Chronicle, however, is quite uniform. Events are listed with little embellishment, and the primary purpose seems to be to give for each event the name of the king or archon ruling in Athens at the time, along with the number of years prior to the base date of the tablet (264/63 BC). The only exceptions are that in nine out of the 107 extant entries, the name of the archon or king is no longer readable, and in 14 entries the number of elapsed years is similarly effaced. The lack of embellishment is shown, for example, in the entry for Cecrops, which attributes nothing remarkable to him or to his reign, even though in later Greek mythology he was a semi-human creature. The Chronicle's entries for Deucalion, who became the center of many flood-myths, are more consistent with the earliest Greek legends that merely state that he fled from a flooding river in his native Lycoreia near the Gulf of Corinth, arriving at Athens where his son later became king.

In contrast to Jacoby's ideas, a 2012 study maintains that the style of the Chronicle's entries suggests that the ultimate source of the information in the Parian Chronicle was the archives of the city of Athens. Authors Rodger Young and Andrew Steinmann base their views on three key inferences from the available evidence:

1. The naming of the reigning king or archon in Athens for each entry is consistent with an Athenian provenance of the material.
2. The source behind each entry must have provided a year-number from which the author of the Parian Chronicle was able to calculate the years to his own time, thus suggesting that the archives from which the information was taken were keeping track of the years since the founding of the kingship in Athens under Cecrops. Such framing chronicles are known to have been kept in Rome: the Anno Urbis Conditae, from which events were reckoned.
3. The annalistic style of the Chronicle is in keeping with the genre of annalistic records such as the Assyrian Eponym Canon, in which the purpose was not so much to describe events as to give an accurate record of when the events occurred, as related to the years since the founding of the kingship and also tying the event to the king or archon who was currently reigning.

Young and Steinmann acknowledge several factors that make it less plausible the source behind the Parian Chronicle was the state archives of Athens. The first is that there are no known examples of writing from Athens that date as early as 1582/81 BC, the date of the Chronicle's first entry. The earliest extant writing in Greek from any area is found in the syllabic Linear B script, for which the earliest instances date to about a century and a half after the reputed beginning of the kingship under Cecrops. Another argument against the Athenian provenance of the information in the Parian Chronicle is the reconstruction given by Jacoby of the first two lines of the tablet, which were largely effaced when Selden made his copy (this top part has since been lost), but of which enough remained that Selden could determine that it was intended as a statement of the source of the tablet's histories. Jacoby's restoration of Selden's Greek text is followed on the Ashmolean Web site, which translates it into English as follows, with square brackets and italics indicating the portion of the text that is conjectural:

[From] al[l the records and general accounts] I have recorded [the previous times], beginning from Cecrops becoming first king of Athens, until [____]uanax was archon in Paros, and Diognetus in Athens.

The critical word here is "general," which represents a Greek original for which Selden could read only the last three letters, νῶν; these are the ending of the genitive plural. Jacoby hypothesized the word was an adjective and restored it to κοινῶν, meaning "common, general, ordinary". This is consistent with Jacoby's theory for the source of the Chronicle's documents, namely that the author used a variety of selections from diverse materials available in the third century BC. The Ashmolean Web site then translated this into English as shown above. Young and Steinmann, however, maintain that "The writer of an annalistic history that professes to give exact dates for events would not assure readers of his credibility by saying that his information was derived from the "common" folklore ... For the Parian Marble, such reassurance would be given if the original word, for which the genitive plural ending - νῶν has survived, was not κοινῶν, but Ἀθηνῶν," i.e. "of Athens," taking the word as a noun (Athens was a plural noun in classical Greek). This restoration would give the reader the assurance that the writer of the tablet had an authoritative source for his information, as follows:

[From] al[l the public records and histories of Ath]ens I have recorded [the previous times], beginning from Cecrops becoming first king of Athens, until [____]uanax was archon in Paros, and Diognetus in Athens.

One other conjecture for the source of the Parian Chronicle's information is of historical interest. In 1788, Joseph Robertson went to considerable length in arguing that the tablets were of relatively recent date and entirely fraudulent. His book is accessible under the External links below. The finding of the bottom portion of the tablet on Páros in 1897 has made Robertson's theory untenable.

== RTI scanning ==
In 2013, Ben Altshuler of the Institute for Digital Archaeology oversaw reflectance transformation imaging (RTI) of the Parian Marble, revealing significant, previously illegible text. RTI scans are also available as part of the Digital Marmor Parium project.
