= John Hewlett =

British theologian

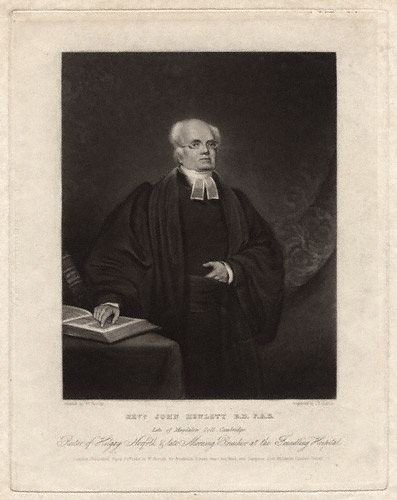
John Hewlett

John Hewlett (1762–13 April 1844) was a prominent biblical scholar in nineteenth-century England.

Hewlett was born in Chetnole, Dorset to Timothy Hewlett. In his early 20s he established a school in Shacklewell, Hackney. During this period, he became acquainted with the young Mary Wollstonecraft, then running her own school at nearby Newington Green. Hewlett persuaded her to write her first book, Thoughts on the Education of Daughters, and sold the yet-unwritten manuscript to the radical publisher Joseph Johnson. He also introduced her to the great lexicographer Samuel Johnson.

In 1786 he was admitted as a sizar to Magdalene College, Cambridge. The Cambridge Alumni Database lists him as "a ten-year man", which the university defines as: "Under the 1570 statutes it was made possible for a man over the age of twenty-four to proceed to the degree of BD ten years after matriculation without first proceeding to the degrees of BA and MA . The privilege was not much used until shortly before its abolition in the mid-nineteenth century when it had degenerated into a system whereby a man could proceed BD without any formal test of his ability." In 1796 he was awarded the Bachelor of Divinity.

Around 1802, he sold the school and accepted the position of morning preacher at the Foundling Hospital in London. He was appointed rector of Hilgay, Downham, Norfolk in 1819 and served as professor of belles-lettres (literature) at the Royal Institution of Great Britain. He is buried in the catacombs of the Foundling Chapel.

Hewlett published on several subjects. His Vindication of the Parian Chronicle (1789) discussed one of the Arundel marbles, some of which are now at the Ashmolean Museum. The Parian Chronicle is a Greek chronology, covering the years from 1582 BC to 299 BCE, inscribed on a stele. He translated Leonhard Euler's Elements of Algebra, one of the first textbooks to set out algebra in a manner we would recognise today.

After the death of George Gregory, Hewlett continued publishing a newly edited Bible serially. He published numerous books of sermons and theology as well as an Introduction to Reading and Spelling (1816). His most important work, however, was his edition of the Bible (1812), which included five volumes of commentaries (1816).

== Works ==
- Sermons on different subjects, 1786; 6th edition, 1816.
- A Vindication of the Authenticity of the Parian Chronicle, in Answer to a Dissertation on that Subject, 1789.
- Answer to some Strictures on the Authenticity of the Parian Chronicle, 1789.
- The Holy Bible, containing the Old and New Testament and Apocrypha, with Critical, Philogical, and Explanatory Notes, 1812 (3 vols.)
- A Manual of Instruction and Devotion on the Sacrament of the Lord's Supper, 1815; 6th edition, 1835.
- An Introduction to Reading and Spelling, 1816.
- Commentaries and Annotations on the Holy Scriptures, 1816 (5 vols.)
- Elements of Algebra. By L. Euler. Revised and corrected, 1822.
