= John Randoll Mackenzie =

Scottish general and politician

Major-General John Randoll Mackenzie
- Born: c. 1763
- Died: 28 July 1809
- Military career
- Allegiance: United Kingdom
- Branch: British Army
- Service years: 1778–1809
- Rank: Major-General
- Commands: 3rd Division
- Conflicts: Napoleonic Wars

Major-General John Randoll Mackenzie of Suddie (c. 1763 – 28 July 1809) was a senior British Army officer who saw action in the Napoleonic Wars.

== Early life ==
MacKenzie was the son of William Mackenzie of Suddie and Margaret Mackenzie (daughter of Sir Alexander Mackenzie, 5th Baronet).

== Military career ==
Mackenzie was commissioned as a second lieutenant in the Marines in 1778. After serving in India, he secured a commission as a captain in the 78th Regiment of Foot when it was raised in 1793 and was deployed to the Dutch Cape Colony in 1795. He was elected as member of parliament for Tain Burghs in 1806 and then transferred to Sutherland in 1808. Deployed to Spain for service in the Peninsular War, he commanded a brigade in the 3rd Division and also became the first General Officer Commanding 3rd Division when it was formed on 18 June 1809. He was killed in action at the Battle of Talavera on 28 July 1809.

Parliament of the United Kingdom
Preceded by James Macdonald	Member of Parliament for Tain Burghs; 1806–1808	Succeeded by William Fremantle
Preceded by William Dundas	Member of Parliament for Sutherland; 1808–1809	Succeeded by George Macpherson-Grant
