= Sir Hugh Innes, 1st Baronet =

Scottish politician

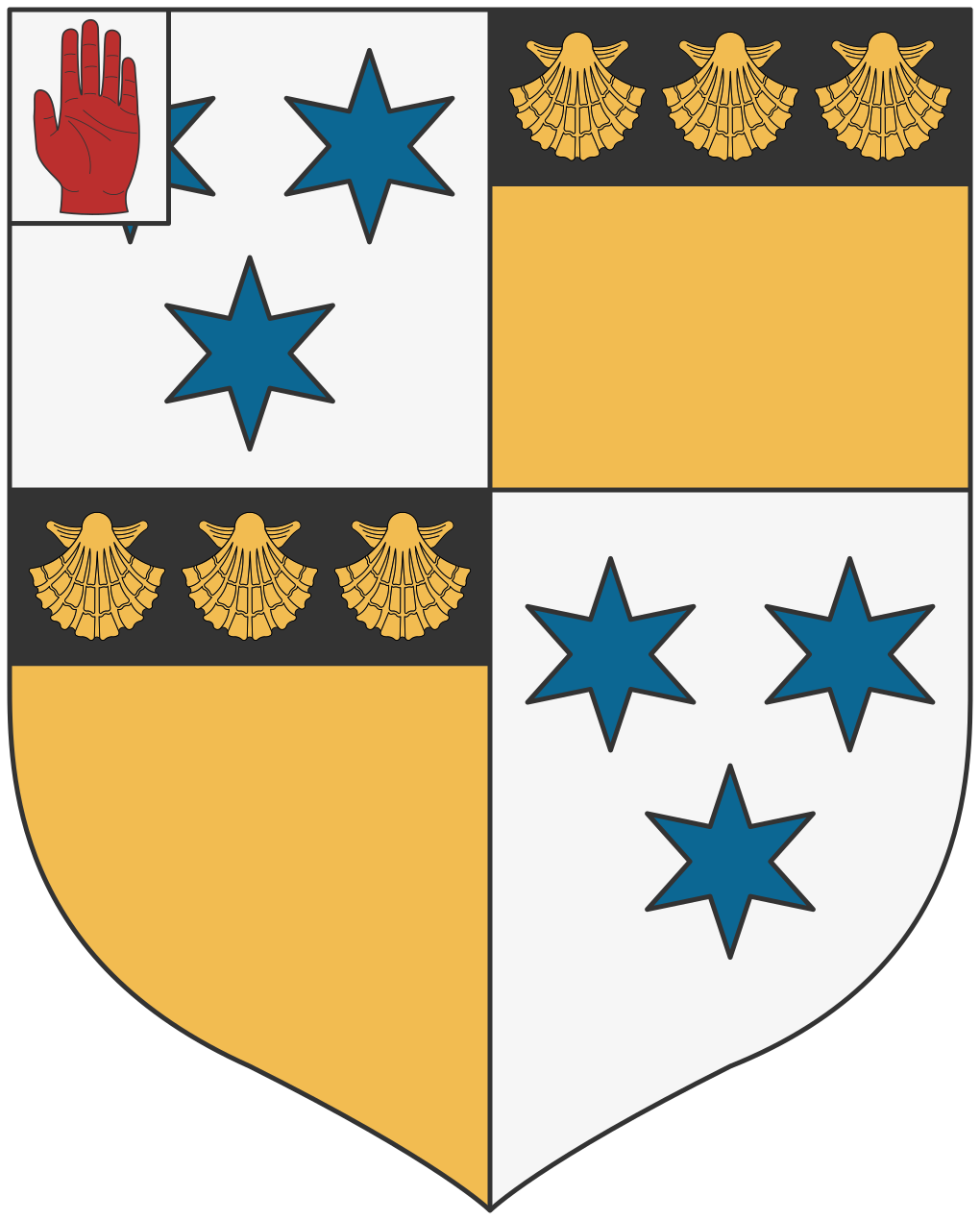
The coat of arms of Innes of Lochalsh, Baronets.

Sir Hugh Innes, 1st Baronet (c. 1764 – 16 August 1831) was a Scottish politician.

Innes was the oldest surviving son of Rev. Hugh Innes of Calton, Glasgow and Jean, daughter of Thomas Graham. He was educated at the University of Glasgow.

He became a wealthy landowner, possibly having made his money in trade.

He was the Member of Parliament (MP) for Ross-shire from 1809 to 1812, for Ross-shire from 1812 to 1830, for Sutherland from May 1831 until his death in August 1831.

Announced on 7 December 1818, Innes was created a baronet on 28 April 1819, of Lochalsh and Coxtown in the County of Moray. However, he never married and died childless, so the baronetcy became extinct on his death. No will was ever found.

Parliament of the United Kingdom
Preceded by Alexander Mackenzie Fraser	Member of Parliament for Ross-shire; 1809 – 1812	Succeeded by William Frederick Mackenzie
Preceded by William Fremantle	Member of Parliament for Tain Burghs; 1812 – 1830	Succeeded by James Loch
Preceded by Lord Francis Leveson-Gower	Member of Parliament for Sutherland; May 1831 – August 1831	Succeeded by Roderick Macleod
Baronetage of the United Kingdom
New creation	Baronet (of Lochalsh and Coxton); 1819 – 1831	Extinct
Preceded by Mahon baronets	Innes baronets of Lochalsh; 28 April 1819	Succeeded by Baillie baronets
