= Elements of Algebra =

Landmark mathematics textbook by Leonhard Euler

The title page of Elements of Algebra

Elements of Algebra is an elementary mathematics textbook written by mathematician Leonhard Euler around 1765 in German. It was first published in Russian as "Universal Arithmetic" (Универсальная арифметика), two volumes appearing in 1768-9 and in 1770 was printed from the original text. Elements of Algebra is one of the earliest books to set out algebra in the modern form we would recognize today (another early book being Elements of Algebra by Nicholas Saunderson, published in 1740), and is one of Euler's few writings, along with Letters to a German Princess, that are accessible to the general public. Written in numbered paragraphs as was common practice till the 19th century, Elements begins with the definition of mathematics and builds on the fundamental operations of arithmetic and number systems, and gradually moves towards more abstract topics.

In 1771, Joseph-Louis Lagrange published an addendum titled Additions to Euler's Elements of Algebra, which featured a number of important mathematical results.

The original German title of the book was Vollständige Anleitung zur Algebra, which literally translates to Complete Instruction to Algebra. Two English translations are now extant, one by John Hewlett (1822), and the other, which is translated to English from a French translation of the book, by Charles Tayler (1824). On the 300th birth anniversary of Euler in 2007, mathematician Christopher Sangwin working with Tarquin Publications published a digitized copy based on Hewlett's translation of the first four sections (or Part I) of the book.

In 2015, Scott Hecht published both print and Kindle versions of Elements of Algebra (ISBN 978-1508901181) with Euler's Part I (Containing the Analysis of Determinate Quantities), Part II (Containing the Analysis of Indeterminate Quantities), Lagrange's Additions, and footnotes by Johann Bernoulli and others.

== See also ==
- Introductio in analysin infinitorum (1748)
- Institutiones calculi differentialis (1755)
