= Sir Walter Stirling, 1st Baronet =

English politician

Sir Walter Stirling, 1st Baronet (24 June 1758 – 25 August 1832) was an English banker and politician.

He was born in Philadelphia the son of Captain Walter Stirling, RN of Faskine, Lanark and his wife Dorothy Willing of Philadelphia.

He was Captain commandant then Major commandant of the Somerset Place Volunteers in 1798, Lieut-Col. of the Prince of Wales's Loyal Middlesex Volunteers in 1803-08 and a member of the London and Westminster Light Horse in 1803–07.

He was a director of the Globe Insurance Co. and a junior partner in the bank of Hodsoll and Michel (later Hodsoll and Stirling) in the Strand. He was elected MP for Gatton, Surrey from 1799 to 1802 and St Ives, Cornwall from 1807 to 1820. He was created a baronet in 1800 and appointed High Sheriff of Kent for 1804–05.

He was a fellow of the Society of Antiquaries and elected a Fellow of the Royal Society in 1801.

In 1794, he married Susannah, the daughter and heiress of George Trenchard Goodenough, FRS of Borwood, Isle of Wight: they had a son and 4 daughters. Lady Stirling died in 1806, and is buried in St Mary's Church, Harmondsworth.

He died in 1832 and was succeeded in the baronetcy by his son Sir Walter George Stirling, 2nd Baronet.

Parliament of Great Britain
| Preceded by John Petrie; John Heathcote | Member of Parliament for Gatton; 1799–1800; With: John Petrie to 1800; James Du Pre from 1800 | Succeeded by Parliament of the United Kingdom |
Parliament of the United Kingdom
| Preceded by Parliament of Great Britain | Member of Parliament for Gatton; 1801–1802; With: James Du Pré | Succeeded by James Dashwood; Sir Mark Wood, Bt |
| Preceded by Francis Horner; Samuel Stephens | Member of Parliament for St Ives; 1807–1820; With: Samuel Stephens to 1812; William Pole-Tylney-Long-Wellesley 1812–18; Samuel Stephens from 1818 | Succeeded by Lyndon Evelyn; James Graham |
Baronetage of Great Britain
| New creation | Baronet (of Faskine); 1800–1832 | Succeeded by Walter George Stirling |
