= Samuel Stephens (junior) =

Samuel Stephens (c. 1768 – 25 February 1834) was a politician in Cornwall. He sat in the House of Commons of the United Kingdom in two periods between 1806 and 1820.

He served as High Sheriff of Cornwall for 1805 and then at the 1806 general election was elected as a Member of Parliament (MP) for St Ives, where he was re-elected in 1807 and held the seat until the 1812 general election, when he did not contest St Ives.

He was re-elected for St Ives at the 1818 general election, and held the seat until the next election, in 1820.

He was the son of a previous MP for St Ives, Samuel Stephens.

On 29 November 1796 he married Betty Wallis, the daughter of Samuel Wallis and daughter of John Hearle of Penryn.

They had five children:

1. Samuel Wallis, his heir.
2. John Augustus.
3. Francis Hearle, a cavalry officer.
4. Henry Lewis, of Oriel College, Oxford, to whom he left Tregenna Castle.
5. Ferdinand Thomas.
6. Sarah-Maria (5 October 1800 – 16 June 1878). She married (6 March 1827) the Reverend Charles William Davy.

Parliament of the United Kingdom
Preceded by William Praed; Jonathan Raine	Member of Parliament for St Ives; 1806–1812; With: Francis Horner 1806–1807; Sir Walter Stirling, Bt 1807–1820	Succeeded by William Pole-Tylney-Long-Wellesley; Sir Walter Stirling, Bt
Preceded by William Pole-Tylney-Long-Wellesley; Sir Walter Stirling, Bt	Member of Parliament for St Ives; 1818–1820; With: Sir Walter Stirling, Bt	Succeeded by Lyndon Evelyn; James Graham
