= List of United Kingdom by-elections (1806–1818) =

This is a list of parliamentary by-elections in the United Kingdom held between 1806 and 1818, with the names of the previous incumbent and the victor in the by-election.

In the absence of a comprehensive and reliable source, for party and factional alignments in this period, no attempt is made to define them in this article. The House of Commons: 1790-1820 provides some guidance to the complex and shifting political relationships, but it is significant that the compilers of that work make no attempt to produce a definitive list of each member's allegiances.

== Resignations ==
Where the cause of by-election is given as "resignation", this indicates that the incumbent was appointed on his own request to an "office of profit under the Crown". Offices used, in this period, were the Stewards of the Chiltern Hundreds or the Manor of East Hendred and the Escheators of Munster or Ulster. These appointments are made as a constitutional device for leaving the House of Commons, whose Members are not permitted to resign. If the vacancy was caused by appointment to another office then this office is noted in brackets.

== By-elections ==
The c/u column denotes whether the by-election was a contested poll or an unopposed return. If the winner was re-elected, at the next general election and any intermediate by-elections, this is indicated by an * following the c or u. In a few cases the winner was elected at the next general election but had not been re-elected in a by-election after the one noted. In those cases no * symbol is used.

=== 3rd Parliament (1806–1807) ===
Date	Constituency	c/u	Former incumbent	Winner	Cause
10 January 1807	Haslemere	u*	Viscount Garlies	Robert Plumer Ward	Succession to a peerage
10 January 1807	Stockbridge	u	Joseph Foster Barham	Sir John Fleming Leicester	Chose to sit for Okehampton
12 January 1807	Eye	u	William Cornwallis	James Cornwallis	Resignation
14 January 1807	Enniskillen	u	Nathaniel Sneyd	Richard Henry Alexander Bennet	Chose to sit for County Cavan
14 January 1807	Minehead	u*	Sir John Lethbridge	John Fownes Luttrell	Resignation
15 January 1807	Mitchell	u	Sir Christopher Hawkins	Sir Arthur Wellesley	Chose to sit for Grampound
15 January 1807	Mitchell	u	Frederick William Trench	Henry Conyngham Montgomery	Resignation
16 January 1807	Helston	u	Nicholas Vansittart	Thomas Brand	Chose to sit for Old Sarum
17 January 1807	Cockermouth	u	John Lowther	Lord Binning	Chose to sit for Cumberland
17 January 1807	Tralee	u	Maurice Fitzgerald	Samuel Boddington	Chose to sit for County Kerry
20 January 1807	Dundalk	u*	John Metge	Josias Porcher	Resignation
21 January 1807	Bletchingley	u	Josias Porcher	John Alexander Bannerman	Resignation to contest Dundalk
21 January 1807	St Mawes	u*	Sir John Newport	William Shipley	Chose to sit for Waterford City
24 January 1807	Lostwithiel	u	William Dickinson	Charles Cockerell	Chose to sit for Somerset
26 January 1807	Midhurst	u	John Smith	Henry Watkin Williams Wynn	Chose to sit for Nottingham
26 January 1807	Midhurst	u	William Wickham	William Conyngham Plunket	Chose to sit for Callington
27 January 1807	Arundel	u	Francis John Wilder	The Lord Lecale	Chose to sit for Horsham
27 January 1807	Heytesbury	u*	Charles Abbot	Charles Moore	Chose to sit for Oxford University
27 January 1807	Heytesbury	u	Sir William Pierce Ashe A'Court	Michael Symes	Resignation
29 January 1807	Sussex	u*	Charles Lennox	Charles William Wyndham	Succession to a peerage
31 January 1807	Dungannon	u	George Knox	Viscount Hamilton	Chose to sit for Dublin University
2 February 1807	Canterbury	u	James Simmons	Samuel Elias Sawbridge	Death
4 February 1807	Coleraine	u*	Sir George Fitzgerald Hill	Walter Jones	Chose to sit for Londonderry City
7 February 1807	Plympton Erle	u	Sir Stephen Lushington	William Assheton Harbord	Death
17 February 1807	Worcester	c*	Henry Bromley	William Gordon	Resignation
26 February 1807	Derby	u	Edward Coke	Thomas William Coke	Resignation to contest Norfolk
4 March 1807	Norfolk	u*	Thomas William Coke	Sir Jacob Henry Astley	Void Election
4 March 1807	Norfolk	u	William Windham	Edward Coke	Void Election
9 March 1807	Harwich	u	William Henry Fremantle	James Adams	Chose to sit for Saltash
13 March 1807	County Armagh	u*	Lord Acheson	William Brownlow	Succeeded to an Irish peerage
23 March 1807	Buckingham	u	Sir William Young	Sir John Borlase Warren	Resignation (Governor of Tobago)
31 March 1807	Carrickfergus	c*	Lord Spencer Stanley Chichester	James Craig	Resignation
1 April 1807	Newtown	u	George Canning	George Canning	Foreign Secretary
1 April 1807	Northampton	u*	Spencer Perceval	Spencer Perceval	Chancellor of the Exchequer
2 April 1807	Calne	u*	Osborne Markham	Henry Smith	Resignation (Commissioner of Barrack Master General)
3 April 1807	Haslemere	u*	Charles Long	Charles Long	Joint Paymaster of the Forces
3 April 1807	Plympton Erle	u*	Viscount Castlereagh	Viscount Castlereagh	Secretary of State for War and the Colonies
4 April 1807	Bere Alston	u*	Lord Lovaine	Lord Lovaine	Commissioner of the Board of Control
6 April 1807	Monmouth Boroughs	u*	Lord Charles Henry Somerset	Lord Charles Henry Somerset	Joint Paymaster of the Forces
9 April 1807	Buckinghamshire	u*	Marquess of Titchfield	Marquess of Titchfield	Junior Lord of the Treasury
13 April 1807	Edinburghshire	u*	Robert Saunders Dundas	Robert Saunders Dundas	President of the Board of Control
13 April 1807	Queen's County	u*	William Wellesley Pole	William Wellesley Pole	Clerk of the Ordnance
14 April 1807	Dorchester	u*	Cropley Ashley	Cropley Ashley	Clerk of the Deliveries of the Ordnance
15 April 1807	Haslemere	u*	Robert Plumer Ward	Robert Plumer Ward	Lord of the Admiralty
15 April 1807	Liskeard	u*	William Eliot	William Eliot	Junior Lord of the Treasury
16 Apr 1807	Weymouth & Melcombe Regis	u*	Sir James Pulteney	Sir James Pulteney	Secretary at War
17 April 1807	Christchurch	u*	George Rose	George Rose	Treasurer of the Navy
17 April 1807	Christchurch	u*	William Sturges Bourne	William Sturges Bourne	Junior Lord of the Treasury
17 April 1807	West Looe	u*	James Buller	James Buller	Lord of the Admiralty
18 April 1807	Great Bedwyn	u	Viscount Stopford	Sir Vicary Gibbs	Treasurer of the Household
20 April 1807	Eye	u*	Marquess of Huntly	Henry Wellesley	Elevated to the House of Lords through a Writ of acceleration
20 April 1807	Marlborough	u*	Earl of Dalkeith	Viscount Stopford	Elevated to the House of Lords through a Writ of acceleration
21 April 1807	Mitchell	u	Sir Arthur Wellesley	Sir Arthur Wellesley	Chief Secretary for Ireland
1 May 1807	Dumfriesshire	u*	William Johnstone Hope	William Johnstone Hope	Naval Lord

=== 4th Parliament (1807–1812) ===
Date	Constituency	c/u	Former incumbent	Winner	Cause
17 July 1807	Launceston	u	Earl Percy	Richard Henry Alexander Bennet	Chose to sit for Northumberland
20 July 1807	Dorchester	u	Cropley Ashley Cooper	Cropley Ashley Cooper	Clerk of the Ordnance
20 July 1807	Grantham	u	Thomas Thoroton	Thomas Thoroton	Clerk of the Deliveries of the Ordnance
20 July 1807	Tavistock	u	Richard Fitzpatrick	Viscount Howick	Chose to sit for Bedfordshire
20 July 1807	Wendover	u	Viscount Mahon	Francis Horner	Chose to sit for Kingston-upon-Hull
20 July 1807	Westbury	u	Edward Lascelles	Henry Lascelles	Chose to sit for Northallerton
21 July 1807	Cockermouth	u	James Lowther	John Osborn	Chose to sit for Cumberland
21 July 1807	Rye	u	Sir John Nicholl	Sir William Elford	Chose to sit for Great Bedwyn
21 July 1807	Rye	u	The Earl of Clancarty	Stephen Rumbold Lushington	Resignation (Joint Postmaster General in Ireland)
22 July 1807	Midhurst	u*	Samuel Smith	Thomas Thompson	Chose to sit for Leicester
22 July 1807	St Mawes	u	William Shipley	Viscount Ebrington	Chose to sit for the Flint Boroughs
24 July 1807	Mitchell	u	Edward Leveson Gower	Sir James Hall	Resignation
27 July 1807	Orford	u	Lord Robert Seymour	William Sloane	Chose to sit for Carmarthenshire
27 July 1807	Tralee	u	Sir Arthur Wellesley	Evan Foulkes	Chose to sit for Newport I.o.W.
27 July 1807	Winchelsea	u	Sir Frederick Fletcher Vane	Sir Oswald Mosley	Resignation
28 July 1807	Youghal	u*	Viscount Boyle	Sir John Keane	Succession to a peerage
29 July 1807	Helston	u	Richard Richards	The Lord Dufferin and Claneboye	Resignation
30 July 1807	Appleby	u	Viscount Howick	Nicholas William Ridley Colborne	Resignation to contest Tavistock
31 July 1807	Athlone	u	Henry Wellesley	John Frewen Turner	Chose to sit for Eye
3 August 1807	Bandon Bridge	u	Viscount Boyle	George Tierney	Succession to a peerage
4 August 1807	Dundalk	u	Josias Porcher	Patrick Crawford Bruce	Chose to sit for Old Sarum
14 August 1807	Yarmouth	u	William Powlett Orde Powlett	Sir John Orde	Succession to a peerage
17 August 1807	Kinross-shire	u	William Adam	David Clephane	Chose to sit for Kincardineshire
21 August 1807	Heytesbury	u	Viscount FitzHarris	Viscount FitzHarris	Governor of the Isle of Wight
18 November 1807	County Monaghan	u	Richard Dawson	Thomas Charles Stewart Corry	Death
10 December 1807	Beaumaris	u	The Lord Newborough	Sir Edward Pryce Lloyd	Death
13 January 1808	Lincoln	c	William Monson	The Earl of Mexborough	Death
19 January 1808	Tavistock	u	Viscount Howick	George Ponsonby	Succeeded to a peerage
27 January 1808	Clitheroe	u	John Cust	James Gordon	Succeeded to a peerage
28 January 1808	Whitchurch	u*	William Brodrick	William Brodrick	Junior Lord of the Treasury
29 January 1808	Castle Rising	u*	Charles Bagot	Fulk Greville Howard	Resignation
29 January 1808	Tiverton	u*	Richard Ryder	Richard Ryder	Junior Lord of the Treasury
30 January 1808	Stamford	u*	John Leland	Evan Foulkes	Death
30 January 1808	Tregony	u	Geoffrey Wentworth Wentworth	William Gore Langton	Resignation
30 January 1808	Yarmouth	u	Jervoise Clarke Jervoise	Benjamin Cooke Griffinhoofe	Death
1 February 1808	Mitchell	u	George Galway Mills	Charles Trelawny-Brereton	Resignation
2 February 1808	Bath	u*	John Palmer	Charles Palmer	Resignation
2 February 1808	Wootton Bassett	u	John Cheesment Severn	Benjamin Walsh	Resignation
4 February 1808	County Donegal	c	Henry Vaughan Brooke	Henry Conyngham Montgomery	Death
16 February 1808	Banbury	c	William Praed	Dudley Long North	Election voided due to double return
16 February 1808	Banbury	c	Dudley Long North	Dudley Long North	Election voided due to double return
22 February 1808	Orford	u	Lord Henry Moore	Lord Henry Moore	Joint Muster Master General of the Forces in Ireland
23 February 1808	Newtown	u*	Dudley Long North	George Anderson-Pelham	Resignation to contest Banbury
24 February 1808	Poole	c	Vacant	Sir Richard Bickerton	No return made due to tie
25 February 1808	Ennis	u	James Fitzgerald	William Fitzgerald	Resignation
25 February 1808	Tralee	u	Evan Foulkes	James Stephen	Resignation to contest Stamford
27 February 1808	County Westmeath	u*	William Smyth	Hercules Robert Pakenham	Resignation
29 February 1808	Boroughbridge	u*	Henry Dawkins	Henry Clinton	Resignation
5 March 1808	Truro	u	Edward Boscawen	Charles Frederick Powlett Townshend	Succeeded to a peerage
17 March 1808	Grampound	c	Andrew Cochrane-Johnstone	Robert Williams	Void Election
17 March 1808	Grampound	c	Robert Williams	William Holmes	By-election result reversed on petition
17 March 1808	Grampound	c	George Augustus Frederick Cochrane	John Teed	Void Election
17 March 1808	Grampound	c*	John Teed	George Augustus Frederick Cochrane	By-election result reversed on petition
24 March 1808	Malton	u	The Lord Headley	Bryan Cooke	Void Election
20 April 1808	Wareham	u	Granby Thomas Calcraft	Samuel Romilly	Resignation
22 April 1808	Sandwich	c	Peter Rainier	John Spratt Rainier	Death
22 April 1808	St Mawes	u	Scrope Bernard	Earl Gower	Resignation
26 April 1808	Yarmouth	u	Benjamin Cooke Griffinhoofe	John Delgarno	Resignation
2 May 1808	Sutherland	u	William Dundas	John Randoll Mackenzie	Resignation
7 May 1808	Tain Burghs	u	John Randoll Mackenzie	William Henry Fremantle	Resignation to contest Sutherland
19 May 1808	Rutland	u*	Gerard Noel Noel	Charles Noel Noel	Resignation
28 May 1808	Reigate	u*	Viscount Royston	James Cocks	Death
13 June 1808	Yarmouth	u	John Delgarno	Viscount Valentia	Resignation
25 June 1808	Great Yarmouth	u	Stephen Lushington	Giffin Wilson	Resignation
11 July 1808	Cockermouth	u*	John Osborn	Viscount Lowther	Resignation
13 July 1808	Richmond	u	Arthur Shakespeare	Lawrence Dundas	Resignation
15 July 1808	Rye	u	Sir William Elford	William Jacob	Resignation
27 July 1808	Dundalk	u	Patrick Craufurd Bruce	Thomas Hughan	Resignation
9 August 1808	County Clare	c*	Francis Nathaniel Burton	Augustine Fitzgerald	Resignation
13 December 1808	Bossiney	u*	The Lord Rendlesham	The Earl of Desart	Death
19 December 1808	Hampshire	c*	Sir Henry Paulet St. John Mildmay	Thomas Freeman Heathcote	Death
25 January 1809	Bletchingley	u	Thomas Freeman Heathcote	Charles Cockrell	Resignation to contest Hampshire
25 January 1809	St Albans	c	James Walter Grimston	Daniel Giles	Succeeded to a peerage
27 January 1809	Westbury	u	Glynn Wynn	Francis Whittle	Resignation
4 February 1809	Kilkenny City	u	Charles Harward Butler	Robert Williams	Resignation
9 February 1809	Pembroke Boroughs	u	Hugh Barlow	Sir Hugh Owen	Death
14 February 1809	Aylesbury	u*	George Henry Compton Cavendish	Thomas Hussey	Death
14 February 1809	Poole	c*	John Jeffery	Benjamin Lester Lester	Resignation (Consul General in Portugal)
21 February 1809	Mitchell	u*	Charles Trelawny Brereton	John Bruce	Resignation
27 February 1809	Stamford	c	Albemarle Bertie	Charles Chaplin	Resignation pending Elevation to the House of Lords having succeeded to a peerage
27 February 1809	Wigtown Burghs	u	Edward Richard Stewart	Lyndon Evelyn	Resignation (Victualling Commissioner)
28 February 1809	St Mawes	u*	Viscount Ebrington	Scrope Bernard	Resignation (Commission in the Army)
8 March 1809	Dungannon	u	Lord Claude Hamilton	Claude Scott	Death
9 March 1809	King's Lynn	u*	Lord Walpole	Lord Walpole	Succeeded to a peerage
14 March 1809	Peterborough	u	French Laurence	Marquess of Tavistock	Death
3 April 1809	Huntingdon	u*	William Meeke Farmer	Samuel Farmer	Resignation
7 April 1809	Newport	u*	Sir Arthur Wellesley	Leonard Worsley-Holmes	Resignation
15 April 1809	Cashel	u	Quintin Dick	Robert Peel	Resignation
18 April 1809	Eye	u	Henry Wellesley	Charles Arbuthnot	Resignation
19 April 1809	Saltash	u*	John Pedley	Michael George Prendergast	Resignation
1 May 1809	Edinburghshire	u	Robert Saunders Dundas	Robert Saunders Dundas	Chief Secretary for Ireland
11 May 1809	Ayr Burghs	u*	John Campbell	Duncan Campbell	Death
26 June 1809	Coleraine	u	Walter Jones	John Poo Beresford	Resignation
30 June 1809	Glasgow Burghs	c	Archibald Campbell	Alexander Houstoun	Resignation
7 July 1809	Staffordshire	u*	Lord Granville Leveson Gower	Lord Granville Leveson Gower	Secretary at War
13 September 1809	Pembroke Boroughs	u*	Sir Hugh Owen	John Owen	Death
29 September 1809	Sutherland	u	John Randoll Mackenzie	George Macpherson Grant	Death
28 November 1809	Ross-shire	c	Alexander Mackenzie Fraser	Hugh Innes	Death
12 December 1809	Abingdon	u	George Knapp	Henry Bowyer	Death
3 January 1810	Buckinghamshire	u*	Marquess of Titchfield	William Selby Lowndes	Succeeded to a peerage
29 January 1810	Dunwich	u	Snowdon Barne	Snowdon Barne	Junior Lord of the Treasury
29 January 1810	Newport	u	The Viscount Palmerston	The Viscount Palmerston	Secretary at War
30 January 1810	Buckingham	u	Thomas Grenville	Lord George Grenville	Resignation
30 January 1810	Malmesbury	u	Sir George Bowyer	Abel Smith	Resignation (Intended to stand for Abingdon)
30 January 1810	Tiverton	u*	Richard Ryder	Richard Ryder	Home Secretary
31 January 1810	Cockermouth	u*	Viscount Lowther	Viscount Lowther	Lord of the Admiralty
31 January 1810	Milborne Port	u	Lord Paget	Viscount Lewisham	Resignation
1 February 1810	Bossiney	u*	The Earl of Desart	The Earl of Desart	Junior Lord of the Treasury
2 February 1810	Camelford	u	Lord Henry Petty	Henry Peter Brougham	Succeeded to a peerage
2 February 1810	Scarborough	u*	Charles Manners Sutton	Charles Manners Sutton	Judge Advocate General
5 February 1810	Edinburghshire	u	Robert Saunders Dundas	Robert Saunders Dundas	President of the Board of Control
5 February 1810	Ennis	u	William Fitzgerald	William Fitzgerald	Lord of the Irish Treasury
9 February 1810	Queen's County	u*	William Wellesley Pole	William Wellesley Pole	Chief Secretary for Ireland
10 February 1810	County Louth	u*	John Jocelyn	Viscount Jocelyn	Resignation (Commissioner of Customs in Ireland)
12 February 1810	Limerick City	u	Charles Vereker	Charles Vereker	Constable of Limerick Castle
16 February 1810	Essex	c*	John Bullock	John Archer Houblon	Death
16 February 1810	Richmond	u*	Charles Lawrence Dundas	Robert Chaloner	Death
27 February 1810	Ludgershall	u	Thomas Everett	Joseph Hague Everett	Death
3 March 1810	Plympton Erle	u	William Assheton Harbord	Henry Drummond	Succeeded to a peerage
3 March 1810	Wexford	u	Richard Nevill	Peter Parker	Resignation
10 March 1810	New Woodstock	u	William Frederick Elliot Eden	George Eden	Death
14 March 1810	New Windsor	u*	Richard Ramsbottom	John Ramsbottom	Resignation
16 March 1810	Cambridgeshire	u*	Charles Philip Yorke	Lord Francis Godolphin Osborne	Teller of the Exchequer
19 March 1810	Hythe	c*	Thomas Godfrey	Sir John Perring	Death
24 March 1810	Westbury	u	Francis Whittle	John De Ponthieu	Resignation
10 April 1810	Marlborough	u*	Viscount Stopford	Edward Stopford	Succeeded to a peerage
16 April 1810	Callington	u*	Thomas Carter	William Stephen Poyntz	Resignation
27 April 1810	St Germans	u	Joseph Sydney Yorke	Charles Philip Yorke	Resignation to provide a seat for his brother
2 May 1810	Renfrewshire	c*	William McDowall	Archibald Speirs	Death
18 May 1810	Gloucestershire	u	George Cranfield Berkeley	Viscount Dursley	Resignation
25 May 1810	St Germans	u	Charles Philip Yorke	Charles Philip Yorke	First Lord of the Admiralty
1 June 1810	Queenborough	c	Joseph Hunt	Richard Wellesley	Expelled for embezzling public funds
15 June 1810	Higham Ferrers	u	William Windham	Viscount Duncannon	Death
28 Jun 1810	Bletchingley	u	William Kenrick	William Kenrick	Master of the Household
29 June 1810	Weymouth and Melcombe Regis	u	Gabriel Tucker Steward	Sir John Lowther Johnstone	Resignation
30 June 1810	Ripon	u*	Frederick John Robinson	Frederick John Robinson	Lord of the Admiralty
2 July 1810	Truro	u	Charles Frederick Powlett Townshend	William John Bankes	Succeeded to a peerage
6 July 1810	Anglesey	u*	Berkeley Paget	Berkeley Paget	Junior Lord of the Treasury
13 July 1810	Dunbartonshire	u*	Henry Glassford	Archibald Campbell-Colquhoun	Resignation
13 July 1810	Elgin Burghs	u	Archibald Campbell-Colquhoun	William Dundas	Resignation to contest Dunbartonshire
8 October 1810	Northampton	u*	Edward Bouverie	William Hanbury	Death
21 November 1810	Amersham	u*	Thomas Drake Tyrwhitt-Drake	William Tyrwhitt-Drake	Death
5 December 1810	Milborne Port	u*	Viscount Lewisham	Edward Paget	Succeeded to a peerage
7 December 1810	Yarmouth	u	Viscount Valentia	Thomas Myers	Resignation
28 December 1810	Brackley	u*	Anthony Henderson	Henry Wrottesley	Death
16 January 1811	County Limerick	c*	William Odell	William Odell	Lord of the Irish Treasury
7 February 1811	Gloucestershire	c*	Viscount Dursley	Sir Berkeley William Guise	Vacated seat to claim peerage
14 February 1811	Ashburton	u*	Walter Palk	John Sullivan	Resignation
22 March 1811	Ayrshire	c*	David Boyle	Sir Hew Dalrymple Hamilton	Resignation (Lord of Session and Justiciary in Scotland)
27 March 1811	Cambridge University	c*	Earl of Euston	The Viscount Palmerston	Succeeded to a peerage
28 March 1811	Galway Borough	u*	James Daly	Frederick Ponsonby	Resignation
10 April 1811	Newport	u	The Viscount Palmerston	Cecil Bisshopp	Resignation to contest Cambridge University
19 April 1811	Ludgershall	u	Joseph Hague Everett	The Lord Headley	Resignation
1 May 1811	Taunton	u*	John Hammet	Henry Powell Collins	Death
10 May 1811	Lewes	u*	Thomas Kemp	Thomas Read Kemp	Death
11 May 1811	Weymouth and Melcombe Regis	u*	Sir James Pulteney	Sir John Murray	Death
14 May 1811	Wootton Bassett	c	Sir John Murray	Robert Knight	Resignation to contest Weymouth
15 May 1811	County Antrim	u*	John Bruce Richard O'Neill	John Bruce Richard O'Neill	Constable of Dublin Castle
29 May 1811	Dorchester	u*	Cropley Ashley Cooper	Charles Henry Bouverie	Succeeded to a peerage
1 June 1811	Haslemere	u*	Robert Ward	Robert Ward	Clerk of the Ordnance
17 June 1811	King's Lynn	u*	Lord Walpole	Lord Walpole	Lord of the Admiralty
22 June 1811	Cricklade	u	Lord Porchester	William Herbert	Succeeded to a peerage
24 June 1811	Abingdon	u*	Henry Bowyer	Sir George Bowyer	Resignation
25 June 1811	Kinross-shire	u	David Clephane	Thomas Graham	Resignation (Commissioner of Excise in Scotland)
28 June 1811	County Waterford	u*	John Claudius Beresford	Sir William Carr Beresford	Resignation
1 July 1811	Wexford	u*	Peter Parker	Richard Nevill	Resignation
6 July 1811	Edinburghshire	u*	Robert Saunders Dundas	Sir George Clerk	Succeeded to a peerage
12 July 1811	Queen's County	u*	William Wellesley Pole	William Wellesley Pole	Chancellor of the Irish Exchequer
20 August 1811	Anstruther Easter Burghs	u*	Sir John Anstruther	Sir John Anstruther	Death
26 August 1811	Caithness	u	Sir John Sinclair	George Sinclair	Resignation (Cashier of Excise in Scotland)
14 October 1811	York	u*	Sir William Mordaunt Milner	Lawrence Dundas	Death
23 October 1811	Totnes	u*	William Adams	Thomas Peregrine Courtenay	Death
4 November 1811	Inverness Burghs	u*	Peter Baillie	Charles Grant	Death
23 December 1811	Shrewsbury	u*	Thomas Jones	Henry Grey Bennet	Death
11 January 1812	East Grinstead	u	Sir Nathaniel Holland	Richard Wellesley	Death
13 January 1812	Lewes	u*	Henry Shelley	George Shiffner	Death
15 January 1812	Aldeburgh	u	John McMahon	John McMahon	Receiver and Paymaster of the Royal Bounty to Officers' Widows
15 January 1812	Queenborough	u*	Richard Wellesley	Robert Moorsom	Junior Lord of the Treasury
15 January 1812	Weobley	u	Lord Guernsey	Lord Apsley	Resignation (Commission in the Army)
16 January 1812	Barnstaple	c	George Woodford Thellusson	William Busk	Death
17 January 1812	West Looe	u	James Buller	Joseph Sydney Yorke	Resignation (Clerk of the Privy Council)
18 January 1812	Weymouth and Melcombe Regis	u	Sir John Lowther Johnstone	Joseph Hume	Death
21 January 1812	Richmond	u	Lawrence Dundas	George Heneage Lawrence Dundas	Resignation to contest York
8 February 1812	Derby	u*	William Cavendish	Henry Frederick Compton Cavendish	Death
21 February 1812	Dundalk	u	Thomas Hughan	Frederick William Trench	Death
26 February 1812	Kincardineshire	u*	William Adam	George Harley Drummond	Resignation
7 March 1812	Plympton Erle	u	Viscount Castlereagh	Viscount Castlereagh	Foreign Secretary
9 March 1812	East Grinstead	u	Richard Wellesley	George William Gunning	Resignation
14 March 1812	Wootton Bassett	u*	Benjamin Walsh	John Attersoll	Expelled for Fraud
19 March 1812	Perthshire	c*	Lord James Murray	James Andrew John Lawrence Charles Drummond	Resignation
26 March 1812	Edinburgh	u*	Sir Patrick Murray	William Dundas	Resignation
1 April 1812	Lisburn	u	Earl of Yarmouth	Earl of Yarmouth	Vice-Chamberlain of the Household
13 April 1812	Aldeburgh	u	John McMahon	Sandford Graham	Resignation (Keeper of the Privy Purse)
13 April 1812	Boston	c*	Thomas Fydell	Peter Robert Drummond Burrell	Death
13 April 1812	Elgin Burghs	u	William Dundas	Archibald Campbell	Resignation to contest Edinburgh
13 April 1812	Northumberland	u*	Earl Percy	Sir Charles Monck	Elevated to the House of Lords through a Writ of acceleration
20 April 1812	County Louth	u*	Viscount Jocelyn	Viscount Jocelyn	Treasurer of the Household
21 April 1812	Hastings	u*	Sir Abraham Hume	Sir Abraham Hume	Resignation to contest Boston
8 May 1812	Launceston	u	Richard Henry Alexander Bennet	Jonathan Raine	Resignation
9 May 1812	County Antrim	u*	John Bruce Richard O'Neill	John Bruce Richard O'Neill	Voted before taking the oath
26 May 1812	Northampton	u*	Spencer Perceval	Lord Compton	Death (assassinated)
30 May 1812	County Down	u	Francis Savage	Robert Ward	Resignation
30 May 1812	Old Sarum	u*	Nicholas Vansittart	James Alexander	Chancellor of the Exchequer
6 June 1812	Staffordshire	u*	Sir Edward Littleton	Edward John Walhouse	Death
8 June 1812	East Grinstead	u	George William Gunning	Nicholas Vansittart	Resignation to provide a seat for Vansittart
9 June 1812	Cambridge University	u*	Sir Vicary Gibbs	John Henry Smyth	Resignation (Puisne Judge in the Court of Common Pleas)
22 June 1812	Plymouth	u*	Thomas Tyrwhitt	Benjamin Bloomfield	Resignation (Gentleman Usher of the Black Rod)
30 Jun 1812	Colchester	u*	Richard Hart Davis	Hart Davis	Resignation to contest Bristol
1 July 1812	Bodmin	u*	Sir William Oglander	Charles Bragge Bathurst	Resignation
3 July 1812	Downton	u*	Sir Thomas Plumer	Sir Thomas Plumer	Attorney General for England and Wales
7 July 1812	Grampound	u*	George Augustus Frederick Cochrane	Andrew James Cochrane Johnstone	Resignation
15 Jul 1812	Bristol	c*	Charles Bragge Bathurst	Richard Hart Davis	Chancellor of the Duchy of Lancaster
6 August 1812	Ashburton	u	Lord Charles Bentinck	Lord Charles Bentinck	Treasurer of the Household
6 August 1812	Ashburton	u*	John Sullivan	John Sullivan	Commissioner of the Board of Control

=== 5th Parliament (1812–1818) ===
Date	Constituency	c/u	Former incumbent	Winner	Cause
21 December 1812	Arundel	u	Henry Thomas Howard Molyneux	Samuel Romilly	Chose to sit for Gloucester
21 December 1812	Midhurst	u	George Smith	Viscount Mahon	Chose to sit for Wendover
21 December 1812	Rye	u	Sir Henry Sullivan	Charles Wetherell	Chose to sit for Lincoln
22 December 1812	Ludgershall	u	Magens Dorrien Magens	Sandford Graham	Resignation
22 December 1812	Ludgershall	u	Joseph Hague Everett	Joseph Birch	Resignation
22 December 1812	Pontefract	c*	Henry Lascelles	Viscount Pollington	Chose to sit for Yorkshire
23 December 1812	Cockermouth	u	John Lowther	Augustus John Foster	Chose to sit for Cumberland
24 December 1812	Petersfield	u*	George Canning	George Canning II	Chose to sit for Liverpool
26 December 1812	Plympton Erle	u	George Duckett	William Douglas	Resignation
28 December 1812	Bletchingley	u	Sir Charles Talbot	Robert William Newman	Death
28 December 1812	Dorchester	u	Charles Henry Bouverie	William A'court	Chose to sit for Downton
29 December 1812	Appleby	u	John Courtenay	George Tierney	Resignation to provide a seat for Tierney
30 December 1812	Clitheroe	u	Viscount Castlereagh	Edward Bootle Wilbraham	Chose to sit for County Down
2 January 1813	Dundalk	u	John Metge	Lyndon Evelyn	Resignation
2 January 1813	Malmesbury	u	Sir Charles Saxton	Peter Patten	Chose to sit for Cashel
4 January 1813	Ennis	u	James Fitzgerald	William Fitzgerald	Resignation
12 February 1813	New Romney	u	Sir John Thomas Duckworth	Sir John Thomas Duckworth	Seeks re-election due an irregularity in his return
13 February 1813	Mitchell	u	George Robert Hobart	Edward Law	Resignation
13 February 1813	Wexford	u	Richard Nevill	John Fish	Resignation (ill health)
17 February 1813	Salisbury	c	William Hussey	George Purefoy-Jervoise	Death
4 March 1813	Callington	u	Sir John Leman Rogers	Charles Rodolph Trefusis	Resignation
6 March 1813	Buckinghamshire	u	Earl Temple	Thomas Grenville	Succeeded to a peerage
11 March 1813	Wootton Bassett	u*	James Kibblewhite	Richard Ellison	Resignation
19 March 1813	Pembroke Boroughs	u	John Owen	Sir Thomas Picton	Chose to sit for Pembrokeshire
29 March 1813	Rye	u	Charles Wetherell	Richard Arkwright	Chose to sit for Shaftesbury
5 April 1813	Sligo	u	George Canning II	Joshua Spencer	Chose to sit for Petersfield
6 April 1813	Wootton Bassett	u	John Attersoll	Robert Rickards	Resignation
10 April 1813	County Monaghan	u	Richard Thomas Dawson	Thomas Charles Stewart Corry	Became an Irish Peer
17 April 1813	St Mawes	u	William Shipley	Francis Horner	Resignation
24 April 1813	Orford	u*	Edmond Alexander MacNaghten	Edmond Alexander MacNaghten	Lord of the Irish Treasury
26 April 1813	Downton	u	Sir Thomas Plumer	Sir Thomas Brooke Pechell	Resignation (Vice Chancellor)
27 April 1813	Downton	u	Charles Henry Bouverie	Edward Golding	Resignation
4 May 1813	Tavistock	u	Richard Fitzpatrick	Lord John Russell	Death
10 May 1813	Eye	u	Sir William Garrow	Sir William Garrow	Attorney General for England and Wales
9 June 1813	Weymouth and Melcombe Regis	c*	Thomas Wallace	Masterton Ure	Void Election
9 June 1813	Weymouth and Melcombe Regis	c	John Broadhurst	Christopher Idle	Void Election
9 June 1813	Weymouth and Melcombe Regis	c	Henry Trail	Viscount Cranborne	Void Election
17 June 1813	Tralee	u	Henry Arthur Herbert	James Evan Baillie	Resignation
22 June 1813	Weobley	u	Viscount St. Asaph	James Lenox William Naper	Death
25 June 1813	Nairnshire	u	Hugh Rose	Sir James Mackintosh	Resignation
16 July 1813	Haddington Burghs	u	Thomas Maitland	Anthony Maitland	Resignation (Governor of Malta)
21 July 1813	Okehampton	u	The Lord Graves	The Lord Graves	Lord of the Bedchamber
20 September 1813	County Durham	u*	Sir Henry Vane Tempest	John George Lambton	Death
10 November 1813	New Woodstock	u	William Thornton	George Eden	Resignation
12 November 1813	Ripon	u*	Frederick John Robinson	Frederick John Robinson	Joint Paymaster of the Forces
22 November 1813	Surrey	c	Sir Thomas Sutton	Samuel Thornton	Death
22 November 1813	Westmorland	u*	The Lord Muncaster	Viscount Lowther	Death
27 November 1813	Cockermouth	u	Viscount Lowther	Thomas Wallace	Junior Lord of the Treasury
4 December 1813	Hedon	u	George Johnstone	John Broadhurst	Death
10 December 1813	Durham City	c	Richard John Lambton	George Allan	Resignation
20 December 1813	Carmarthen	u*	George Campbell	John Frederick Campbell	Resignation
30 December 1813	Monmouth Boroughs	u*	Lord Charles Henry Somerset	Marquess of Worcester	Resignation (Governor of the Cape Colony)
19 January 1814	Inverness Burghs	u	Charles Grant	Charles Grant	Junior Lord of the Treasury
5 March 1814	County Mayo	c*	Henry Augustus Dillon Lee	Dominick Browne	Became an Irish Peer
11 March 1814	Eye	u	Sir William Garrow	Sir William Garrow	Chief Justice of Chester
23 March 1814	County Kildare	u*	Lord Henry Fitzgerald	Lord William Charles O'Brien Fitzgerald	Resignation
11 April 1814	Dorchester	u*	William A'court	Samuel Shepherd	Resignation
11 April 1814	Nottinghamshire	u	Lord William Henry Cavendish Bentinck	Frank Frank	Resignation
16 April 1814	Newton	u*	Peter Heron	Thomas Legh	Resignation
21 April 1814	Inverness Burghs	u	Charles Grant	Charles Grant	Voted before taking the oath
25 April 1814	County Waterford	u*	Richard Power	Richard Power	Death
28 April 1814	Truro	u	John Lemon	George Dashwood	Death
9 May 1814	Marlborough	u	Lord Bruce	William Hill	Succeeded to a peerage
9 May 1814	Rutland	u*	Charles Noel Noel	Sir Gerard Noel Noel	Resignation
19 May 1814	Newark	u	Sir Stapleton Cotton	George Hay Dawkins Pennant	Elevated to the peerage
21 May 1814	Lincoln	u*	Sir Henry Sullivan	Coningsby Waldo Sibthorp	Death
25 May 1814	County Waterford	u*	Sir William Carr Beresford	Lord George Thomas Beresford	Elevated to the peerage
27 May 1814	Kilkenny City	u*	Overington Blunden	Charles Harward Blunden	Resignation
27 May 1814	Shrewsbury	c*	Sir Rowland Hill	Richard Lyster	Elevated to the peerage
10 June 1814	Coleraine	u*	Lord George Thomas Beresford	Sir John Poo Beresford	Resignation to contest County Waterford
14 June 1814	New Woodstock	u	George Eden	William Thornton	Succeeded to a peerage
22 June 1814	Huntingdonshire	u	Viscount Hinchingbrooke	Lord Proby	Succeeded to a peerage
24 June 1814	Northallerton	u	Viscount Lascelles	John Bacon Sawrey Morritt	Death
13 July 1814	Grampound	c	Andrew James Cochrane Johnstone	Ebenezer John Collett	Expelled for conspiracy
16 July 1814	Westminster	u	Lord Cochrane	Lord Cochrane	Expelled for conspiracy
19 July 1814	County Londonderry	u	Charles William Stewart	Alexander Stewart	Elevated to the peerage
25 July 1814	Roxburghshire	u*	Viscount Melgund	Alexander Don	Succeeded to a peerage
2 August 1814	Mitchell	u	John Bruce	Charles Trelawny Brereton	Resignation
3 August 1814	Bewdley	u	Miles Peter Andrews	Charles Edward Wilsonn	Death
4 August 1814	Lymington	u	John Kingston	John Taylor	Resignation
8 August 1814	Chichester	u*	William Huskisson	William Huskisson	First Commissioner of Woods and Forests
9 August 1814	Wexford	u*	John Fish	Richard Nevill	Resignation
10 August 1814	Edinburgh	u*	William Dundas	William Dundas	Keeper of the Signet
12 August 1814	Aldborough	u	Henry Dawkins	Henry Gally Knight	Resignation
12 August 1814	Queen's County	u*	William Wellesley Pole	William Wellesley Pole	Master of the Mint
16 September 1814	Belfast	u	Sir Edward May	Stephen Edward May	Death
25 October 1814	Ross-shire	u	William Frederick Mackenzie	Charles Mackenzie Fraser	Death
7 November 1814	Cardiff Boroughs	u	Lord William Stuart	Lord Evelyn James Stuart	Death
18 November 1814	Newtown	u	Barrington Pope Blachford	Barrington Pope Blachford	Lord of the Admiralty
22 November 1814	Newport	u	Richard Worsley-Holmes	John Delgarno	Death
24 November 1814	Aylesbury	u	Thomas Hussey	Charles Compton Cavendish	Resignation
24 November 1814	Bletchingley	u	William Kenrick	John Bolland	Resignation
28 November 1814	Glamorganshire	u	Thomas Wyndham	Benjamin Hall	Death
5 December 1814	Mitchell	u	Charles Trelawny Brereton	Lord Binning	Resignation
5 December 1814	Westbury	u*	Benjamin Hall	Ralph Franco	Resignation to contest Glamorganshire
17 February 1815	Southwark	c	Henry Thornton	Charles Barclay	Death
9 March 1815	Downpatrick	c*	Charles Stewart Hawthorne	Viscount Glerawly	Resignation (Commissioner of Excise in Ireland)
24 March 1815	Bandon Bridge	u	Richard Boyle Bernard	William Sturges Bourne	Resignation
27 March 1815	Sligo	u	Joshua Spencer	Sir Brent Spencer	Resignation
31 March 1815	Thirsk	u*	William Frankland	Robert Frankland	Resignation
14 April 1815	East Grinstead	u	James Stephen	Sir George Johnstone Hope	Resignation
4 May 1815	Aldborough	u*	Henry Gally Knight	Granville Venables Vernon	Resignation
26 June 1815	Ludgershall	u	Sandford Graham	Charles Nicholas Pallmer	Resignation
3 July 1815	Pembroke Boroughs	u	Sir Thomas Picton	John Jones	Death (Killed in Action)
17 July 1815	Bedford	u	Samuel Whitbread	William Waldegrave	Death
19 July 1815	Wells	u*	Clement Tudway	John Paine Tudway	Death
21 July 1815	Winchelsea	u*	William John Frederick Vane Powlett	Henry Peter Brougham	Resignation to contest Durham
22 July 1815	Newcastle-under-Lyme	c	Earl Gower	Sir John Chetwode	Resignation to contest Staffordshire
31 July 1815	Staffordshire	u*	Lord Granville Leveson Gower	Earl Gower	Resignation pending elevation to the peerage
1 August 1815	County Durham	u*	Viscount Barnard	William John Frederick Vane Powlett	Resignation (Commission in the Army)
7 August 1815	Clackmannanshire	u	George Abercromby	Sir John Abercromby	Resignation
7 August 1815	County Londonderry	u*	William Ponsonby	George Robert Dawson	Death
23 September 1815	County Armagh	u	William Brownlow	Henry Caulfeild	Death
12 October 1815	Oxfordshire	u*	Lord Francis Almeric Spencer	William Henry Ashhurst	Elevation to the peerage
12 February 1816	Winchelsea	u	Calverley Bewicke	Viscount Barnard	Death
13 February 1816	County Wicklow	u*	William Hoare Hume	Granville Leveson Proby	Death
13 February 1816	Corfe Castle	u*	Peter William Baker	George Bankes	Death
14 February 1816	Seaford	u	John Leach	Sir Charles Cockerell	Resignation
20 February 1816	Weobley	u*	William Lennox Bathurst	Lord Frederick Cavendish Bentinck	Resignation (Deputy Teller of the Exchequer)
23 February 1816	Calne	u*	Joseph Jekyll	James Macdonald	Resignation
29 February 1816	Staffordshire	u*	Earl Gower	Earl Gower	Voted before taking oath
1 March 1816	Cockermouth	u*	Augustus John Foster	John Henry Lowther	Resignation
1 March 1816	Portarlington	u*	Arthur Shakespeare	Richard Sharp	Resignation
4 March 1816	Yarmouth	u	Sir Henry Conyngham Montgomery	John Leslie Foster	Resignation
6 March 1816	Sutherland	u*	James Macdonald	George Macpherson Grant	Resignation to contest Calne
8 March 1816	Carlisle	c*	Henry Fawcett	John Christian Curwen	Death
11 March 1816	West Looe	u	Charles Buller	Henry William Fitzgerald De Ros	Resignation
11 March 1816	West Looe	u*	Anthony Buller	Charles Hulse	Resignation (Puisne Judge at Madras)
12 March 1816	Minehead	u*	John Fownes Luttrell	Henry Fownes Luttrell	Death
13 March 1816	Lewes	c*	Thomas Read Kemp	Sir John Shelley	Resignation
19 March 1816	Newport (Cornwall)	u*	Jonathan Raine	Jonathan Raine	King's Counsel
21 March 1816	Haddingtonshire	u*	Charles Hope	Sir James Suttie	Resignation
26 March 1816	Lostwithiel	u	Reginald Pole Carew	Viscount Valletort	Resignation
29 March 1816	Lyme Regis	u*	Lord Burghersh	John Thomas Fane	Resignation
2 April 1816	Droitwich	u*	Sir Thomas Edward Winnington	The Earl of Sefton	Resignation
15 April 1816	East Looe	u*	David Vanderheyden	Thomas Potter MacQueen	Resignation
15 April 1816	Newport	u	John Delgarno	George Watson-Taylor	Resignation
16 April 1816	Peterborough	u*	George Ponsonby	William Lamb	Resignation to contest Wicklow
18 April 1816	County Carlow	u	David Latouche	Robert Anthony Latouche	Death
19 April 1816	County Wicklow	u	William Tighe	George Ponsonby	Death
3 May 1816	Belfast	u	Stephen Edward May	John Michel	Resignation (Collector of Customs at Belfast)
8 May 1816	Armagh City	u	Patrick Duigenan	Daniel Webb Webber	Death
9 May 1816	Dartmouth	u*	Edmund Pollexfen Bastard	John Bastard	Resignation to contest Devon
10 May 1816	Rye	u	Thomas Phillipps Lamb	John Maberly	Resignation
13 May 1816	Devon	c*	John Pollexfen Bastard	Edmund Pollexfen Bastard	Death
17 May 1816	Warwick	u*	Lord Brooke	Sir Charles John Greville	Succeeded to a peerage
20 May 1816	Monmouthshire	u*	Lord Arthur John Henry Somerset	Lord Granville Somerset	Death
27 May 1816	Cardiganshire	u*	Thomas Johnes	William Edward Powell	Death
29 May 1816	Monmouth Boroughs	u*	Marquess of Worcester	Marquess of Worcester	Lord of the Admiralty
3 June 1816	Newtown	u*	Barrington Pope Blachford	Hudson Gurney	Death
5 June 1816	Buckingham	u	Viscount Ebrington	Viscount Ebrington	Resignation to contest Devon
7 June 1816	Mitchell	u	Lord Binning	Lord Binning	Commissioner of the Board of Control
12 June 1816	Liverpool	c*	George Canning	George Canning	President of the Board of Control
12 June 1816	Milborne Port	u*	Sir Edward Paget	Sir Edward Paget	Groom of the Bedchamber
15 June 1816	Gatton	u	Sir William Congreve	Mark Wood	Resignation
27 June 1816	Rochester	c*	Sir James Boulden Thompson	James Barnett	Resignation (Treasurer and Receiver General of Greenwich Hospital)
3 July 1816	Yarmouth	u	John Leslie Foster	John Leslie Foster	Advocate General for Ireland
8 July 1816	Nottinghamshire	u*	Viscount Newark	Lord William Henry Cavendish Bentinck	Succeeded to a peerage
8 July 1816	Wootton Bassett	c*	Robert Rickards	William Taylor Money	Resignation (ill-health)
12 July 1816	Plympton Erle	u*	William Douglas	Alexander Boswell	Resignation
19 July 1816	Dunbartonshire	u*	Archibald Campbell Colquhoun	Archibald Campbell Colquhoun	Lord Clerk Register
2 August 1816	Wigtownshire	u	William Stewart	James Hunter Blair	Resignation
13 August 1816	Whitchurch	u*	William Augustus Townshend	Horatio George Powys Townshend	Death
1 October 1816	Gloucester	c*	Robert Morris	Edward Webb	Death
5 October 1816	Lincolnshire	c	Charles Chaplin	William Cust	Death
7 October 1816	Dunwich	u*	The Lord Huntingfield	The Lord Huntingfield	Death
9 October 1816	Portsmouth	u*	Sir Thomas Miller	John Carter	Death
11 November 1816	Wilton	u*	Charles Herbert	Viscount FitzHarris	Death
5 December 1816	Worcestershire	u*	Viscount Elmley	Henry Beauchamp Lygon	Succeeded to a peerage
23 December 1816	Worcester	u*	Abraham Robarts	Viscount Deerhurst	Death
3 February 1817	Midhurst	u	Viscount Mahon	Sir Oswald Mosley	Succeeded to a peerage
6 February 1817	Hertford	u*	Edward Spencer Cowper	Viscount Cranborne	Resignation
8 February 1817	Malmesbury	u	William Hicks Beach	Sir William Abdy	Resignation
10 February 1817	Londonderry City	u*	Sir George Fitzgerald Hill	Sir George Fitzgerald Hill	Vice-Treasurer of Ireland
18 February 1817	Yarmouth	u	Richard Wellesley	Alexander Maconochie	Resignation
21 February 1817	Castle Rising	u*	Augustus Cavendish Bradshaw	Earl of Rocksavage	Resignation
26 February 1817	County Down	u*	John Meade	Lord Arthur Moyses William Hill	Resignation (Consul-General in Spain)
6 March 1817	Rochester	u*	James Barnett	James Barnett	Void Election
12 March 1817	St Mawes	u*	Francis Horner	Joseph Phillimore	Death
12 March 1817	Tavistock	u	Lord John Russell	Lord Robert Spencer	Resignation
17 March 1817	Colchester	u	Robert Thornton	Sir William Burroughs	Resignation
28 March 1817	Bridport	u*	William Draper Best	Henry Charles Sturt	Resignation (Puisne Justice of Chester)
11 April 1817	Clackmannanshire	u	Sir John Abercromby	Alexander Abercromby	Death
14 April 1817	Weymouth and Melcombe Regis	u	Viscount Cranborne	Adolphus John Dalrymple	Resignation to contest Hertford
14 May 1817	Dorchester	u*	Sir Samuel Shepherd	Sir Samuel Shepherd	Attorney General for England and Wales
16 May 1817	Eye	u*	Sir William Garrow	Robert Gifford	Resignation (Baron of the Exchequer)
24 May 1817	Norfolk	c*	Sir Jacob Henry Astley	Edmund Wodehouse	Death
10 June 1817	London	u*	Harvey Christian Combe	Matthew Wood	Resignation
10 June 1817	Oxford University	u*	Charles Abbot	Robert Peel	Elevation to the peerage
12 June 1817	Bossiney	u	The Earl of Desart	William Yates Peel	Resignation
19 June 1817	Chippenham	u	Robert Peel	John Maitland	Resignation to contest Oxford University
23 June 1817	Buckingham	u	Viscount Ebrington	James Hamilton Stanhope	Resignation
28 June 1817	Ludgershall	u*	Charles Nicholas Pallmer	The Earl of Carhampton	Resignation
22 July 1817	Harwich	u*	Nicholas Vansittart	Nicholas Vansittart	Chancellor of the Exchequer of Ireland
25 July 1817	Limerick City	c*	Charles Vereker	John Prendergast Vereker	Became an Irish Peer
12 August 1817	County Wicklow	u*	George Ponsonby	William Parnell Hayes	Death
6 September 1817	Glamorganshire	u	Benjamin Hall	Sir Christopher Cole	Death
5 November 1817	New Romney	u	Sir John Thomas Duckworth	Cholmeley Dering	Death
3 February 1818	Ripon	u*	Frederick John Robinson	Frederick John Robinson	Treasurer of the Navy
6 February 1818	Cockermouth	u	Thomas Wallace	Thomas Wallace	Vice-President of the Board of Trade
14 February 1818	Plymouth	u*	Benjamin Bloomfield	Sir William Congreve	Resignation (Keeper of the Privy Purse)
18 February 1818	Yarmouth	u	Alexander Maconochie	John Singleton Copley	Resignation to contest Anstruther
19 February 1818	Colchester	c*	Hart Davis	James Beckford Wildman	Resignation (Ill health)
26 February 1818	St Albans	c*	Joseph Thompson Halsey	William Tierney Robarts	Death
6 March 1818	Christchurch	u*	George Rose	George Henry Rose	Death
7 March 1818	Southampton	u*	George Henry Rose	William Chamberlayne	Clerk of the Parliaments
14 March 1818	Anstruther Easter Burghs	u*	Sir John Carmichael Anstruther	Alexander Maconochie	Death
18 March 1818	Winchester	u*	Richard Meyler	James Henry Leigh	Death
21 March 1818	Great Bedwyn	u*	James Henry Leigh	John Jacob Buxton	Resignation to contest Winchester
1 May 1818	Yarmouth	u	John Leslie Foster	John Leslie Foster	Second Counsel to the Commissioners of Revenue in Ireland
13 May 1818	East Grinstead	u*	Sir George Johnstone Hope	Lord Strathavon	Death
