= List of MPs elected in the 1812 United Kingdom general election =

1812–1818 Parliament of the United Kingdom
←	1807–1812 Parliament	1818–1820 Parliament	→
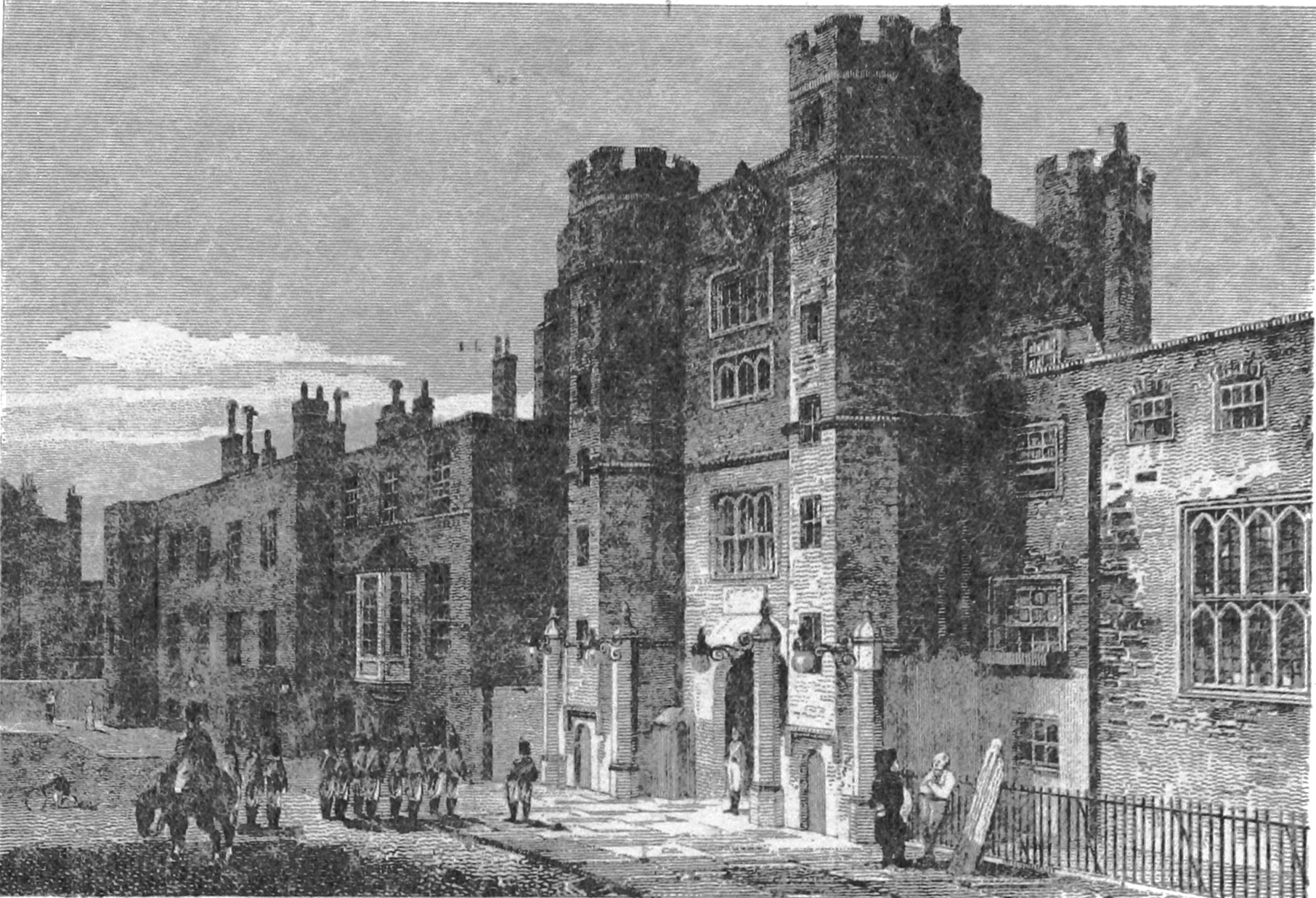
- The Palace of Westminster in 1820

Overview
- Legislative body: Parliament of the United Kingdom
- Jurisdiction: United Kingdom
- Meeting place: Palace of Westminster
- Election: 1812 United Kingdom general election
- Government: Liverpool ministry

House of Commons
- Speaker: Charles Abbot (until 1817); Charles Manners-Sutton (from 1817)
- Leader: Robert Stewart, Viscount Castlereagh
- Prime Minister: Robert Jenkinson, 2nd Earl of Liverpool
- Leader of the Opposition: George Ponsonby

House of Lords
- Lord Chancellor: John Scott, 1st Earl of Eldon
- Leader: 2nd Earl of Liverpool
- Leader of the Opposition: William Grenville, 1st Baron Grenville (until 1817); Charles Grey, 2nd Earl Grey (from 1817)

Crown-in-Parliament George III

Sessions
- 1st: 24 November 1812 – 22 July 1813
- 2nd: 4 November 1813 – 30 July 1814
- 3rd: 8 November 1814 – 12 July 1815
- 4th: 1 February 1816 – 2 July 1816
- 5th: 28 January 1817 – 12 July 1817
- 6th: 27 January 1818 – 10 June 1818

This is a list of the MPs or members of Parliament elected to the House of Commons for the constituencies of the Parliament of the United Kingdom in the 1812 United Kingdom general election, the 5th Parliament of the United Kingdom, and their replacements returned at subsequent by-elections, arranged by constituency.

Table of contents:

A B C D E F G H I J K L M N O P Q R S T U V W X Y Z By-elections Changes

== A ==
Aberdeen Burghs (seat 1/1)	James Farquhar	
Aberdeenshire (seat 1/1)	James Ferguson	Tory
Abingdon (seat 1/1)	Sir George Bowyer	Whig
Aldborough (seat 1/2)	Henry Fynes	Tory
Aldborough (seat 2/2)	Henry Dawkins – resigned Replaced by Henry Gally Knight 1814 – resigned Replaced Granville Venables Vernon 1815	Tory
Aldeburgh (seat 1/2)	The Lord Dufferin & Claneboye	Tory
Aldeburgh (seat 2/2)	Andrew Strahan	Tory
Amersham (seat 1/2)	William Tyrwhitt-Drake	Tory
Amersham (seat 2/2)	Thomas Tyrwhitt-Drake	Tory
Andover (seat 1/2)	Thomas Assheton Smith I	Tory
Andover (seat 2/2)	Newton Fellowes	Whig
Anglesey (seat 1/1)	Berkeley Paget	Whig
Anstruther Easter Burghs (seat 1/1)	Sir John Anstruther – died Replaced by Alexander Maconochie 1818	
County Antrim(seat 1/2)	Hon. John Bruce Richard O'Neill	Tory
County Antrim (seat 2/2)	Earl of Yarmouth	Tory
Appleby (seat 1/2)	James Lowther	Tory
Appleby (seat 2/2)	John Courtenay – resigned Replaced by George Tierney 1812	Whig; Whig
Argyllshire (seat 1/1)	Lord John Campbell	
Armagh (seat 1/1)	Patrick Duigenan – died Replaced by Daniel Webb Webber 1816	Tory; Tory
County Armagh (seat 1/2)	William Brownlow – died Replaced by Henry Caulfeild 1815	Tory; Whig
County Armagh (seat 2/2)	William Richardson	Tory
Arundel (seat 1/2)	Henry Thomas Howard Molyneux – sat for Gloucester; Replaced by Samuel Romilly 1812	
Arundel (seat 2/2)	Francis Wilder	
Ashburton (seat 1/2)	John Sullivan	
Ashburton (seat 2/2)	Richard Preston	
Athlone (seat 1/1)	John Wilson Croker	Tory
Aylesbury (seat 1/2)	George Nugent, 1st Bt.	
Aylesbury (seat 2/2)	Thomas Hussey – resigned Replaced by Charles Compton Cavendish 1814	
Ayr Burghs (seat 1/1)	Duncan Campbell	
Ayrshire (seat 1/1)	Sir Hew Dalrymple-Hamilton	
== B ==
Banbury (seat 1/1)	Frederick Sylvester North Douglas	
Bandon	Richard Boyle Bernard – resigned Replaced by William Sturges Bourne 1815	Tory; Tory
Banffshire (seat 1/1)	Robert Abercromby	
Barnstaple (seat 1/2)	Sir Manasseh Masseh Lopes	Tory
Barnstaple (seat 2/2)	Sir Eyre Coote	
Bath (seat 1/2)	Lord John Thynne	
Bath (seat 2/2)	Charles Palmer	
Beaumaris (seat 1/1)	Thomas Lewis	
Bedford (seat 1/2)	Lord George Russell	Whig
Bedford (seat 2/2)	Samuel Whitbread – died Replaced by Hon. William Waldegrave 1815	Whig; Whig
Bedfordshire (seat 1/2)	Marquess of Tavistock	Whig
Bedfordshire (seat 2/2)	Francis Pym	Whig
Belfast	James Edward May– died Replaced by Stephen Edward May 1814 – took office Replaced by John Michel 1816	Tory; Tory; Tory
Bere Alston (seat 1/2)	Hon. Josceline Percy	
Bere Alston (seat 2/2)	Lord Lovaine	
Berkshire (seat 1/2)	Hon. Richard Neville	Whig
Berkshire (seat 2/2)	Charles Dundas	Whig
Berwickshire (seat 1/1)	George Baillie	
Berwick-upon-Tweed (seat 1/2)	Alexander Allan	
Berwick-upon-Tweed (seat 2/2)	Henry Heneage St Paul	
Beverley (seat 1/2)	John Wharton	Whig
Beverley (seat 2/2)	Charles Forbes	Tory
Bewdley (seat 1/1)	Miles Peter Andrews – died Replaced by Charles Edward Wilsonn 1814	
Bishops Castle (seat 1/2)	William Clive	
Bishops Castle (seat 2/2)	John Robinson	
Bletchingley (seat 1/2)	Charles Cockrell Sir Charles Talbot – died Replaced by Robert William Newman 1812	
Bletchingley (seat 2/2)	William Kenrick – resigned Replaced by John Bolland 1814	
Bodmin (seat 1/2)	Charles Bragge Bathurst	
Bodmin (seat 2/2)	Davies Giddy	
Boroughbridge (seat 1/2)	William Henry Clinton	Tory
Boroughbridge (seat 2/2)	Henry Clinton	Tory
Bossiney (seat 1/2)	Hon. James Stuart-Wortley	Tory
Bossiney (seat 2/2)	The Earl of Desart – resigned Replaced by William Yates Peel 1817	Tory; Tory
Boston (seat 1/2)	William Alexander Madocks	
Boston (seat 2/2)	Peter Robert Drummond Burrell	
Brackley (seat 1/2)	Henry Wrottesley	Tory
Brackley (seat 2/2)	Robert Haldane Bradshaw	Tory
Bramber (seat 1/2)	John Irving	
Bramber (seat 2/2)	William Wilberforce	Independent
Brecon (seat 1/1)	Charles Morgan Robinson Morgan	Whig
Breconshire (seat 1/1)	Thomas Wood	Tory
Bridgnorth (seat 1/2)	Hon. Charles Jenkinson	
Bridgnorth (seat 2/2)	Thomas Whitmore	
Bridgwater (seat 1/2)	William Astell	
Bridgwater (seat 2/2)	George Pocock	
Bridport (seat 1/2)	William Draper Best – took office Replaced by Henry Charles Sturt 1817	Tory
Bridport (seat 2/2)	Sir Horace St Paul, Bt	
Bristol (seat 1/2)	Richard Hart Davis	Tory
Bristol (seat 2/2)	Edward Protheroe	Whig
Buckingham (seat 1/2)	Viscount Ebrington– resigned Replaced by James Hamilton Stanhope	
Buckingham (seat 2/2)	William Henry Fremantle	
Buckinghamshire (seat 1/2)	Earl Temple – succeeded to peerage Replaced by Thomas Grenville 1813	
Buckinghamshire (seat 2/2)	William Selby Lowndes	
Bury St Edmunds (seat 1/2)	Lord Charles FitzRoy	
Bury St Edmunds (seat 2/2)	Frederick Thomas Hervey Foster	
Buteshire (seat 0/0)	John Marjoribanks	
== C ==
Caernarvon Boroughs (seat 1/1)	Hon. Sir Charles Paget	
Caernarvonshire (seat 1/1)	Robert Williams	
Caithness (seat 0/0)	Alternated with Buteshire. No representation in 1812	
Callington (seat 1/2)	Sir John Leman Rogers – resigned Replaced by Charles Rodolph Trefusis 1813	Tory
Callington (seat 2/2)	William Stephen Poyntz	Whig
Calne (seat 1/2)	Joseph Jekyll – resigned Replaced by James Macdonald 1816	
Calne (seat 2/2)	Hon. James Abercromby	Whig
Cambridge (seat 1/2)	Edward Finch	Tory
Cambridge (seat 2/2)	Robert Manners	Tory
Cambridgeshire (seat 1/2)	Lord Charles Manners	
Cambridgeshire (seat 2/2)	Lord Francis Godolphin Osborne	Tory
Cambridge University (seat 1/2)	John Henry Smyth	Whig
Cambridge University (seat 2/2)	The Viscount Palmerston	Tory
Camelford (seat 1/2)	William Leader	Whig
Camelford (seat 2/2)	Samuel Scott	
Canterbury (seat 1/2)	John Baker	Whig
Canterbury (seat 2/2)	Stephen Rumbold Lushington	Tory
Cardiff Boroughs (seat 1/1)	Lord William Stuart – died Replaced by Lord Evelyn James Stuart 1814	Tory; Tory
Cardigan Boroughs (seat 1/1)	Hon. John Vaughan	
Cardiganshire (seat 1/1)	Thomas Johnes – died Replaced by William Edward Powell 1816	Tory
Carlisle (seat 1/2)	Sir James Graham, 1st Bt	Tory
Carlisle (seat 2/2)	Henry Fawcett – died Replaced by John Christian Curwen 1816	Whig
Carlow (seat 1/1)	Frederick John Falkiner	
County Carlow (seat 1/2)	David Latouche – died Replaced by Robert Anthony Latouche 1816	Whig; Whig
County Carlow (seat 2/2)	Henry Bruen	Tory
Carmarthen (seat 1/1)	Vice-Admiral George Campbell – resigned Replaced by John Frederick Campbell 1813	
Carmarthenshire (seat 1/1)	Lord Robert Seymour	Tory
Carrickfergus (seat 1/1)	Arthur Chichester	Tory
Cashel (seat 1/1)	Sir Charles Saxton, Bt	Tory
Castle Rising (seat 1/2)	Augustus Cavendish Bradshaw – resigned Replaced by Earl of Rocksavage 1817	Tory; Tory
Castle Rising (seat 2/2)	Fulk Greville Howard	Tory
County Cavan (seat 1/2)	John Maxwell-Barry	Tory
County Cavan (seat 2/2)	Nathaniel Sneyd	Tory
Cheshire (seat 1/2)	Davies Davenport	
Cheshire (seat 2/2)	Wilbraham Egerton	Tory
Chester (seat 1/2)	John Grey Egerton	
Chester (seat 2/2)	Thomas Grosvenor	
Chichester (seat 1/2)	Charles Gordon-Lennox	Tory
Chichester (seat 2/2)	William Huskisson	
Chippenham (seat 1/2)	Charles Brooke	
Chippenham (seat 2/2)	Robert Peel – resigned Replaced by John Maitland 1817	
Christchurch (seat 1/2)	William Edward Tomline	
Christchurch (seat 2/2)	George Rose – died Replaced by George Henry Rose 1818	
Cirencester (seat 1/2)	Michael Hicks-Beach	
Cirencester (seat 2/2)	Henry Bathurst	Tory
Clackmannanshire (seat 1/1)	George Abercromby – resigned Replaced by Sir John Abercromby 1815– died Replaced by Alexander Abercromby 1817	
County Clare (seat 1/2)	Augustine Fitzgerald	Tory
County Clare (seat 2/2)	Sir Edward O'Brien, 4th Baronet	Whig
Clitheroe (seat 1/2)	Viscount Castlereagh – sat for County Down; Replaced by Edward Bootle Wilbraham 1812	Tory; Tory
Clitheroe (seat 2/2)	Hon. Robert Curzon	Tory
Clonmel (seat 1/1)	Rt Hon. William Bagwell	Tory
Cockermouth (seat 1/2)	Viscount Lowther – took office Replaced by John Henry Lowther 1816	Tory; Tory
Cockermouth (seat 2/2)	John Lowther – sat for Cumberland; Replaced by Augustus John Foster 1812 – resigned Replaced by Thomas Wallace 1813	Tory; Tory; Tory
Colchester (seat 1/2)	Robert Thornton – resigned Replaced by Sir William Burroughs 1817	Tory; Tory
Colchester (seat 2/2)	Hart Davis – resigned Replaced by James Beckford Wildman 1818	Tory
Coleraine (seat 1/1)	Lord George Thomas Beresford – resigned Replaced by John Poo Beresford 1814	Tory; Tory
Corfe Castle (seat 1/2)	Peter William Baker; Replaced by George Bankes	Tory; Tory
Corfe Castle (seat 2/2)	Henry Bankes	Tory
Cork (seat 1/2)	Sir Nicholas Colthurst, Bt	Tory
Cork (seat 2/2)	Mountifort Longfield	Tory
County Cork (seat 1/2)	Viscount Bernard	
County Cork (seat 2/2)	Viscount Ennismore	
Cornwall (seat 1/2)	John Hearle Tremayne	Tory
Cornwall (seat 2/2)	Sir William Lemon, Bt	Whig
Coventry (seat 1/2)	Joseph Butterworth	
Coventry (seat 2/2)	Peter Moore	
Cricklade (seat 1/2)	Joseph Pitt	
Cricklade (seat 2/2)	Thomas Calley	Whig
Cromartyshire (seat 0/0)	Alternated with Nairnshire. No representation in 1812	
Cumberland (seat 1/2)	Viscount Morpeth	Tory
Cumberland (seat 2/2)	John Lowther	Tory
== D ==
Dartmouth (seat 1/2)	Edmund Pollexfen Bastard – resigned Replaced by John Bastard 1816	Tory -
Dartmouth (seat 2/2)	Arthur Howe Holdsworth	–
Denbigh Boroughs (seat 1/1)	Viscount Kirkwall	Tory
Denbighshire (seat 1/1)	Sir Watkin Williams-Wynn, 5th Baronet	
Derby (seat 1/2)	Henry Cavendish	
Derby (seat 2/2)	Edward Coke	
Derbyshire (seat 1/2)	Lord George Cavendish	Whig
Derbyshire (seat 2/2)	Edward Miller Mundy	Tory
Devizes (seat 1/2)	Joshua Smith	
Devizes (seat 2/2)	Thomas Grimston Estcourt	
Devon (seat 1/2)	John Pollexfen Bastard – died Replaced by Edmund Pollexfen Bastard 1816	Tory -
Devon (seat 2/2)	Sir Thomas Dyke-Acland, Bt	
County Donegal (seat 1/2)	Sir James Stewart, Bt	Tory
County Donegal (seat 2/2)	George Vaughan Hart	–
Dorchester (seat 1/2)	Charles Henry Bouverie – sat for Downton; Replaced by William A'court 1812 – resigned Replaced by Samuel Shepherd 1814	
Dorchester (seat 2/2)	Robert Williams	
Dorset (seat 1/2)	Edward Berkeley Portman	
Dorset (seat 2/2)	William Morton Pitt	
Dover (seat 1/2)	John Jackson	
Dover (seat 2/2)	Charles Jenkinson	
County Down (seat 1/2)	Hon. John Meade – took office Replaced by Lord Arthur Moyses William Hill 1817	- Whig
County Down (seat 2/2)	Robert Stewart, Viscount Castlereagh	Tory
Downpatrick	Charles Stewart Hawthorne – took office Replaced by Viscount Glerawly 1815	Whig; Tory
Downton (seat 1/2)	Charles Henry Bouverie – resigned Replaced by Sir Thomas Brooke Pechell 1813	Whig –
Downton (seat 2/2)	Sir Thomas Plumer –– took office Replaced by Edward Golding 1813	Tory -
Drogheda	Henry Meade Ogle	Tory
Droitwich (seat 1/2)	Sir Thomas Winnington, Bt – resigned Replaced by The Earl of Sefton 1816	Whig
Droitwich (seat 2/2)	Andrew Foley	Whig
Dublin (seat 1/2)	Robert Shaw	Tory
Dublin (seat 2/2)	Rt Hon. Henry Grattan	Whig
County Dublin (seat 1/2)	Hans Hamilton	Tory
County Dublin (seat 2/2)	Richard Talbot	Whig
Dublin University	William Plunket	Whig
Dumfries Burghs (seat 1/1)	Lord William Douglas	
Dumfriesshire (seat 1/1)	Sir William Johnstone Hope	
Dunbartonshire (seat 1/1)	Archibald Campbell Colquhoun	
Dundalk	John Metge – resigned Replaced by Lyndon Evelyn 1813	Tory; Tory
Dungannon	George Peter Holford	
Dungarvan	Hon. George Walpole	Whig
Dunwich (seat 1/2)	Michael Barne	
Dunwich (seat 2/2)	The Lord Huntingfield I– died Replaced by The Lord Huntingfield II 1816	
Durham (City of) (seat 1/2)	Richard Wharton	Tory
Durham (City of) (seat 2/2)	Ralph John Lambton – resigned Replaced by George Allan 1813	
Durham (County) (seat 1/2)	Sir Henry Vane-Tempest, Bt – died Replaced by John George Lambton 1813	Tory; Radical
Durham (County) (seat 2/2)	Viscount Barnard – took office Replaced by William John Frederick Vane Powlett 1815	Whig
Dysart Burghs (seat 1/1)	Sir Ronald Crauford Ferguson	Whig
== E ==
East Grinstead (seat 1/2)	George Gunning	
East Grinstead (seat 2/2)	James Stephen – resigned Replaced by Sir George Johnstone Hope 1815 – died Replaced by Lord Strathavon 1818	
East Looe (seat 1/2)	Sir Edward Buller	Tory
East Looe (seat 2/2)	David Vanderheyden – resigned Replaced by Thomas Potter MacQueen 1816	Tory; Tory
East Retford (seat 1/2)	George Osbaldeston	
East Retford (seat 2/2)	Charles Marsh	
Edinburgh (seat 1/1)	William Dundas	
Edinburghshire (seat 1/1)	Sir George Clerk	
Elgin Burghs (seat 1/1)	Patrick Milne	
Elginshire (seat 1/1)	Francis William Grant	Tory
Ennis	James Fitzgerald – resigned Replaced by William Fitzgerald 1813	Tory
Enniskillen	Richard Magenis	Tory
Essex (seat 1/2)	John Archer Houblon	
Essex (seat 2/2)	Charles Callis Western	
Evesham (seat 1/2)	William Manning	
Evesham (seat 2/2)	Humphrey Howorth	Whig
Exeter (seat 1/2)	William Courtenay	
Exeter (seat 2/2)	James Buller	
Eye (seat 1/2)	Sir William Garrow – took office Replaced by Robert Gifford 1817	
Eye (seat 2/2)	Mark Singleton	
== F ==
County Fermanagh (seat 1/2)	Mervyn Archdall	Tory
County Fermanagh (seat 2/2)	Hon. Galbraith Lowry Cole	Tory
Fife (seat 1/1)	William Wemyss	
Flint Boroughs (seat 1/1)	William Shipley	
Flintshire (seat 1/1)	Sir Thomas Mostyn	
Forfarshire (seat 1/1)	William Maule	
Fowey (seat 1/2)	William Rashleigh	Tory
Fowey (seat 2/2)	Robert Wigram (junior)	Tory
== G ==
Galway	Frederick Ponsonby – unseated on petition Replaced by Valentine Blake 1813	Tory
County Galway (seat 1/2)	James Daly	Tory
County Galway (seat 2/2)	Denis Bowes Daly	Tory
Gatton (seat 1/2)	Sir Mark Wood, Bt	
Gatton (seat 2/2)	Sir William Congreve – resigned Replaced by Mark Wood 1816	
Glamorganshire (seat 1/1)	Thomas Wyndham – died Replaced by Benjamin Hall 1814 – died Replaced by Sir Christopher Cole1817	
Glasgow Burghs (seat 1/1)	Kirkman Finlay	Tory
Gloucester (seat 1/2)	Henry Thomas Howard	Whig
Gloucester (seat 2/2)	Robert Morris – died Replaced by Edward Webb 1816	Whig
Gloucestershire (seat 1/2)	Lord Edward Somerset	Tory
Gloucestershire (seat 2/2)	Sir Berkeley Guise, Bt	Whig
Grampound (seat 1/2)	John Teed	Whig
Grampound (seat 2/2)	Andrew James Cochrane Johnstone – expelled Replaced by Ebenezer John Collett 1814	
Grantham (seat 1/2)	Robert Percy Smith	
Grantham (seat 2/2)	Sir William Earle Welby, Bt	
Great Bedwyn (seat 1/2)	John Jacob Buxton	Tory
Great Bedwyn (seat 2/2)	James Henry Leigh – resigned Replaced by John Jacob Buxton 1818	Tory
Great Grimsby (seat 1/2)	John Peter Grant	
Great Grimsby (seat 2/2)	Sir Robert Heron, Bt	
Great Marlow (seat 1/2)	Pascoe Grenfell	Whig
Great Marlow (seat 2/2)	Owen Williams	Whig
Great Yarmouth (seat 1/2)	William Loftus	
Great Yarmouth (seat 2/2)	Edmund Knowles Lacon	
Guildford (seat 1/2)	Thomas Cranley Onslow	Tory
Guildford (seat 2/2)	Arthur Onslow	Tory
== H ==
Haddington Burghs (seat 1/1)	Thomas Maitland – took office Replaced by Anthony Maitland 1813	
Haddingtonshire (seat 1/1)	Charles Hope – resigned Replaced by Sir James Suttie 1816	
Hampshire (seat 1/2)	Thomas Freeman Heathcote	
Hampshire (seat 2/2)	William John Chute	
Harwich (seat 1/2)	Nicholas Vansittart	Tory
Harwich (seat 2/2)	John Hiley Addington	
Haslemere (seat 1/2)	Robert Ward	Tory
Haslemere (seat 2/2)	Charles Long	Tory
Hastings (seat 1/2)	James Dawkins	
Hastings (seat 2/2)	Sir Abraham Hume	
Haverfordwest (seat 1/1)	The 2nd Baron Kensington	
Hedon (seat 1/2)	George Johnstone – died Replaced by John Broadhurst 1813	
Hedon (seat 2/2)	Anthony Browne	
Helston (seat 1/2)	William Horne	Whig
Helston (seat 2/2)	Hugh Hammersley	
Hereford (seat 1/2)	Thomas Powell Symonds	
Hereford (seat 2/2)	Richard Philip Scudamore	
Herefordshire (seat 1/2)	Thomas Foley	Whig
Herefordshire (seat 2/2)	Sir John Cotterell, Bt	Tory
Hertford (seat 1/2)	Edward Spencer Cowper – resigned Replaced by Viscount Cranborne 1817	Whig; Tory
Hertford (seat 2/2)	Nicolson Calvert	Whig
Hertfordshire (seat 1/2)	Hon. Thomas Brand	Whig
Hertfordshire (seat 2/2)	Sir John Sebright, Bt	Whig
Heytesbury (seat 1/2)	Samuel Hood	
Heytesbury (seat 2/2)	Charles Duncombe	
Higham Ferrers (seat 1/1)	William Plumer	Whig; Whig
Hindon (seat 1/2)	William Beckford	Whig
Hindon (seat 2/2)	Benjamin Hobhouse	Whig
Honiton (seat 1/2)	Richard Howard-Vyse	
Honiton (seat 2/2)	George Robinson	
Horsham (seat 1/2)	Arthur Piggott	
Horsham (seat 2/2)	Robert Hurst	Whig
Huntingdon (seat 1/2)	Samuel Farmer	
Huntingdon (seat 2/2)	John Calvert	
Huntingdonshire (seat 1/2)	Viscount Hinchingbrooke – succeeded to peerage Replaced by Lord Proby 1814	
Huntingdonshire (seat 2/2)	William Henry Fellowes	
Hythe (seat 1/2)	Matthew White	
Hythe (seat 2/2)	Sir John Perring	
== I ==
Ilchester (seat 1/2)	Hon. John Ward	Tory
Ilchester (seat 2/2)	George Philips	Whig
Inverness Burghs (seat 1/1)	Charles Grant	
Inverness-shire (seat 1/1)	Charles Grant (senior)	Pittite/Tory
Ipswich (seat 1/2)	John Round	
Ipswich (seat 2/2)	Robert Alexander Crickitt	
== K ==
Kent (seat 1/2)	Sir Edward Knatchbull, Bt	Tory
Kent (seat 2/2)	Sir William Geary, Bt	Tory
County Kerry (seat 1/2)	James Crosbie	
County Kerry (seat 2/2)	Rt Hon. Maurice Fitzgerald	Whig
County Kildare (seat 1/2)	Lord Henry Fitzgerald – resigned Replaced by Lord William Charles O'Brien Fitzgerald 1814	Whig
County Kildare (seat 2/2)	Robert La Touche	Whig
Kilkenny (seat 1/1)	Overington Blunden – resigned Replaced by Charles Harward Blunden 1814	
County Kilkenny (seat 1/2)	Hon. Frederick Ponsonby	Whig
County Kilkenny (seat 2/2)	Hon. James Butler	Whig
Kincardineshire (seat 1/1)	George Harley Drummond	
King's County (seat 1/2)	Hardress Lloyd	Tory
King's County (seat 2/2)	Thomas Bernard (senior)	Tory
King's Lynn (seat 1/2)	Lord Walpole	
King's Lynn (seat 2/2)	Sir Martin ffolkes, Bt	
Kingston upon Hull (seat 1/2)	George William Denys	Whig
Kingston upon Hull (seat 2/2)	John Staniforth	Tory
Kinross-shire (seat 0/0)	Alternated with Clackmannanshire. Unrepresented in this Parliament	
Kinsale (seat 1/1)	Henry Martin	Whig
Kirkcudbright Stewartry (seat 1/1)	James Dunlop	
Knaresborough (seat 1/2)	Viscount Ossulston	Whig
Knaresborough (seat 2/2)	Lord John Townshend	Whig
== L ==
Lanarkshire (seat 1/1)	Lord Archibald Hamilton	Whig
Lancashire (seat 1/2)	Lord Stanley	
Lancashire (seat 2/2)	John Blackburne	
Lancaster (seat 1/2)	John Fenton-Cawthorne	Tory
Lancaster (seat 2/2)	Gabriel Doveton	Whig
Launceston (seat 1/2)	Pownoll Bastard Pellew	Tory
Launceston (seat 2/2)	James Brogden	Tory
Leicester (seat 1/2)	Thomas Babington	
Leicester (seat 2/2)	Samuel Smith	
Leicestershire (seat 1/2)	Lord Robert William Manners	
Leicestershire (seat 2/2)	George Anthony Legh Keck	
County Leitrim (seat 1/2)	Henry John Clements	Tory
County Leitrim (seat 2/2)	John La Touche	
Leominster (seat 1/2)	John Lubbock	
Leominster (seat 2/2)	John Harcourt	
Lewes (seat 1/2)	George Shiffner	
Lewes (seat 2/2)	Thomas Read Kemp – resigned Replaced by Sir John Shelley 1816	
Lichfield (seat 1/2)	George Granville Venables Vernon	Whig
Lichfield (seat 2/2)	Sir George Anson	Whig
Limerick	Charles Vereker– ennobled Replaced by John Prendergast Vereker 1817	Tory
County Limerick (seat 1/2)	Hon. Windham Henry Quin	
County Limerick (seat 2/2)	William Odell	
Lincoln (seat 1/2)	John Nicholas Fazakerley	
Lincoln (seat 2/2)	Sir Henry Sullivan – died Replaced by Coningsby Waldo Sibthorp 1814	
Lincolnshire (seat 1/2)	Charles Anderson-Pelham	
Lincolnshire (seat 2/2)	Charles Chaplin – died Replaced by William Cust 1816	
Linlithgow Burghs (seat 1/1)	Sir John Buchanan Riddell, Bt	
Linlithgowshire (seat 1/1)	Sir Alexander Hope	
Lisburn	Lord Henry Seymour Moore	Tory
Liskeard (seat 1/2)	William Eliot	Tory
Liskeard (seat 2/2)	Charles Philip Yorke	Tory
Liverpool (seat 1/2)	Isaac Gascoyne	Tory
Liverpool (seat 2/2)	George Canning	Tory
London (City of) (seat 1/4)	William Curtis	Tory
London (City of) (seat 2/4)	Sir James Shaw, Bt	Tory
London (City of) (seat 3/4)	John Atkins	Tory
London (City of) (seat 4/4)	Harvey Christian Combe – resigned Replaced by Matthew Wood 1817	Whig
Londonderry	Sir George Hill, Bt	Tory
County Londonderry (seat 1/2)	Hon. Charles William Stewart – ennobled Replaced by Alexander Stewart 1814	Tory
County Londonderry (seat 2/2)	William Ponsonby – died Replaced by George Robert Dawson 1815	Tory
County Longford (seat 1/2)	Sir Thomas Fetherston, Bt	Tory
County Longford (seat 2/2)	Viscount Forbes	Tory
Lostwithiel (seat 1/2)	Reginald Pole Carew – resigned Replaced by Viscount Valletort 1816	
Lostwithiel (seat 2/2)	John Ashley Warre	
County Louth (seat 1/2)	John Foster	Tory
County Louth (seat 2/2)	Viscount Jocelyn	Tory
Ludgershall (seat 1/2)	Magens Dorrien Magens – resigned Replaced by Sandford Graham 1812 – resigned Replaced by Charles Nicholas Pallmer 1815 – resigned Replaced by The Earl of Carhampton 1817	Tory; Whig; Whig; Tory
Ludgershall (seat 2/2)	Joseph Hague Everett – resigned Replaced by Joseph Birch	Tory; Whig
Ludlow (seat 1/2)	Viscount Clive	Tory
Ludlow (seat 2/2)	Henry Clive	
Lyme Regis (seat 1/2)	Henry Fane	Tory
Lyme Regis (seat 2/2)	Lord Burghersh – resigned Replaced by John Thomas Fane 1816	Tory
Lymington (seat 1/2)	Sir Harry Burrard-Neale, Bt	
Lymington (seat 2/2)	John Kingston – resigned Replaced by John Taylor 1814	
== M ==
Maidstone (seat 1/2)	George Simson	
Maidstone (seat 2/2)	Samuel Egerton Brydges	
Maldon (seat 1/2)	Joseph Holden Strutt	Tory
Maldon (seat 2/2)	Benjamin Gaskell	Whig
Mallow	Sir James Cotter, Bt	
Malmesbury (seat 1/2)	William Hicks Beach – resigned Replaced by Sir William Abdy 1817	Tory –
Malmesbury (seat 2/2)	Sir Charles Saxton – sat for Cashel; Replaced by Peter Patten 1813	Tory; Tory
Malton (seat 1/2)	John Ramsden	Whig
Malton (seat 2/2)	Viscount Duncannon	Whig
Marlborough (seat 1/2)	Lord Bruce – succeeded to peerage Replaced by William Hill 1814	- Tory
Marlborough (seat 2/2)	Edward Stopford	
County Mayo (seat 1/2)	Rt Hon. Denis Browne	Tory
County Mayo (seat 2/2)	Hon. Henry Augustus Dillon – ennobled Replaced by Dominick Browne 1814	Whig
County Meath (seat 1/2)	Thomas Taylour, Earl of Bective	
County Meath (seat 2/2)	Sir Marcus Somerville, Bt	Whig
Merionethshire (seat 1/1)	Sir Robert Williames Vaughan	Tory
Middlesex (seat 1/2)	George Byng	Whig
Middlesex (seat 2/2)	William Mellish	Tory
Midhurst (seat 1/2)	Thomas Thompson	
Midhurst (seat 2/2)	George Smith – sat for Wendover; Replaced by Viscount Mahon 1812 – succeeded to peerage Replaced by Sir Oswald Mosley 1817	
Milborne Port (seat 1/2)	Edward Paget	Tory
Milborne Port (seat 2/2)	Robert Matthew Casberd	Tory
Minehead (seat 1/2)	John Fownes Luttrell, junior	Tory
Minehead (seat 2/2)	John Fownes Luttrell – died Replaced by Henry Fownes Luttrell 1816	Tory
Mitchell (seat 1/2)	George Robert Hobart – resigned Replaced by Edward Law 1813	Tory
Mitchell (seat 2/2)	John Bruce – resigned Replaced by Charles Trelawny Brereton 1814 – resigned Replaced by Lord Binning 1814	Tory
County Monaghan (seat 1/2)	Richard Thomas Dawson – ennobled Replaced by Thomas Charles Stewart Corry 1813	
County Monaghan (seat 2/2)	Charles Powell Leslie II	
Monmouth Boroughs (seat 1/1)	Lord Charles Henry Somerset – took office Replaced by Marquess of Worcester 1813	
Monmouthshire (seat 1/2)	Lt Col. Sir Charles Morgan	
Monmouthshire (seat 2/2)	Lord Arthur John Henry Somerset – died Replaced by Lord Granville Somerset 1816	
Montgomery (seat 1/1)	Whitshed Keene	
Montgomeryshire (seat 1/1)	Charles Williams-Wynn	Tory
Morpeth (seat 1/2)	William Ord	Whig
Morpeth (seat 2/2)	Hon. William Howard	
== N ==
Nairnshire (seat 1/1)	Hugh Rose – resigned Replaced by Sir James Mackintosh 1813	
New Romney (seat 1/2)	Sir John Thomas Duckworth – died Replaced by Cholmeley Dering 1817	Tory; Tory
New Romney (seat 2/2)	William Mitford	Tory
New Ross	Charles Leigh	
New Shoreham (seat 1/2)	Sir Charles Merrik Burrell, Bt	Tory
New Shoreham (seat 2/2)	Timothy Shelley	
Newark (seat 1/2)	Henry Willoughby	Tory
Newark (seat 2/2)	Sir Stapleton Cotton – ennobled Replaced by George Hay Dawkins Pennant 1814	
Newcastle-under-Lyme (seat 1/2)	Earl Gower – resigned Replaced by Sir John Chetwode 1815	Whig
Newcastle-under-Lyme (seat 2/2)	Sir John Boughey, Bt	
Newcastle-upon-Tyne (seat 1/2)	Sir Matthew Ridley, Bt	Whig
Newcastle-upon-Tyne (seat 2/2)	Cuthbert Ellison	Whig
Newport (Cornwall) (seat 1/2)	William Northey	Tory
Newport (Cornwall) (seat 2/2)	Jonathan Raine	Tory
Newport (Isle of Wight) (seat 1/2)	Richard Worsley-Holmes – died Replaced by John Delgarno 1814 – resigned Replaced by George Watson-Taylor 1816	
Newport (Isle of Wight) (seat 2/2)	Leonard Worsley-Holmes	
Newry	Hon. Francis Needham	Tory
Newton (Lancashire) (seat 1/2)	Peter Heron – resigned Replaced by Thomas Legh 1814	
Newton (Lancashire) (seat 2/2)	John Ireland Blackburne	
Newtown (Isle of Wight) (seat 1/2)	Barrington Pope Blachford – died Replaced by Hudson Gurney 1816	Tory; Whig
Newtown (Isle of Wight) (seat 2/2)	George Anderson-Pelham	Whig; Whig
Norfolk (seat 1/2)	Thomas Coke	Whig
Norfolk (seat 2/2)	Sir Jacob Henry Astley – died Replaced by Edmund Wodehouse 1817	Whig; Tory
Northallerton (seat 1/2)	Viscount Lascelles – died Replaced by John Bacon Sawrey Morritt 1814	Tory; Tory
Northallerton (seat 2/2)	Henry Peirse (younger)	Whig
Northampton (seat 1/2)	Lord Compton	
Northampton (seat 2/2)	William Hanbury	
Northamptonshire (seat 1/2)	Viscount Althorp	Whig
Northamptonshire (seat 2/2)	William Ralph Cartwright	Tory
Northumberland (seat 1/2)	Sir Charles Monck	
Northumberland (seat 2/2)	Thomas Richard Beaumont	
Norwich (seat 1/2)	William Smith	Radical
Norwich (seat 2/2)	Charles Harvey	
Nottingham (seat 1/2)	The Lord Rancliffe	
Nottingham (seat 2/2)	John Smith	Tory
Nottinghamshire (seat 1/2)	Lord William Henry Cavendish Bentinck – resigned Replaced by Frank Frank 1814	
Nottinghamshire (seat 2/2)	Viscount Newark – succeeded to peerage Replaced by Lord William Bentinck 1816	
== O ==
Okehampton (seat 1/2)	The Lord Graves	Tory
Okehampton (seat 2/2)	Albany Savile	Tory
Old Sarum (seat 1/2)	James Alexander	Tory
Old Sarum (seat 2/2)	Josias Porcher	Tory
Orford (seat 1/2)	Charles Arbuthnot	Tory
Orford (seat 2/2)	Edmond Alexander MacNaghten	Tory
Orkney and Shetland (seat 1/1)	Richard Honyman	
Oxford (seat 1/2)	John Atkyns-Wright	
Oxford (seat 2/2)	John Ingram Lockhart	
Oxfordshire (seat 1/2)	Lord Francis Spencer – ennobled Replaced by William Henry Ashhurst 1815	Whig; Tory
Oxfordshire (seat 2/2)	John Fane	Tory
Oxford University (seat 1/2)	Sir William Scott	Tory
Oxford University (seat 2/2)	Charles Abbot – ennobled Replaced by Robert Peel 1817	Tory; Tory
== P ==
Peeblesshire (seat 1/1)	James Montgomery	
Pembroke Boroughs (seat 1/1)	John Owen – sat for Pembrokeshire; Replaced by Sir Thomas Picton 1813 – killed in action Replaced by John Jones 1815	Tory
Pembrokeshire (seat 1/1)	John Owen	
Penryn (seat 1/2)	Henry Swann	Tory
Penryn (seat 2/2)	Philip Gell	Tory
Perth Burghs (seat 1/1)	Sir David Wedderburn, Bt	Tory
Perthshire (seat 1/1)	James Drummond	Tory
Peterborough (seat 1/2)	George Ponsonby – resigned Replaced by William Lamb 1816	Whig; Whig
Peterborough (seat 2/2)	William Elliot	Whig
Petersfield (seat 1/2)	Hylton Jolliffe	
Petersfield (seat 2/2)	George Canning – sat for Liverpool; Replaced by George Canning II 1812	
Plymouth (seat 1/2)	Benjamin Bloomfield – took office Replaced by Sir William Congreve 1818	
Plymouth (seat 2/2)	Admiral Sir Charles Pole	
Plympton Erle (seat 1/2)	Ranald George Macdonald	
Plympton Erle (seat 2/2)	George Duckett – resigned Replaced by William Douglas 1812 – resigned Replaced by Alexander Boswell 1816	
Pontefract (seat 1/2)	Robert Pemberton Milnes	
Pontefract (seat 2/2)	Henry Lascelles – sat for Yorkshire; Replaced by Viscount Pollington 1812	
Poole (seat 1/2)	Michael Angelo Taylor	Whig
Poole (seat 2/2)	Benjamin Lester Lester	Whig
Portarlington	Arthur Shakespeare – resigned Replaced by Richard Sharp 1816	
Portsmouth (seat 1/2)	John Markham	Whig
Portsmouth (seat 2/2)	Sir Thomas Miller – died Replaced by John Carter 1816	Whig; Whig
Preston (seat 1/2)	Edmund Hornby	Whig
Preston (seat 2/2)	Samuel Horrocks	Tory
== Q ==
Queenborough (seat 1/2)	Robert Moorsom	Tory
Queenborough (seat 2/2)	John Osborn	Tory
Queen's County (seat 1/2)	Hon. William Wellesley-Pole	Tory
Queen's County (seat 2/2)	Henry Brooke Parnell	Whig
== R ==
Radnor Boroughs (seat 1/1)	Richard Price	Tory
Radnorshire (seat 1/1)	Walter Wilkins	Whig
Reading (seat 1/2)	Charles Shaw-Lefevre	
Reading (seat 2/2)	John Simeon	
Reigate (seat 1/2)	John Somers-Cocks	Tory
Reigate (seat 2/2)	James Cocks	
Renfrewshire (seat 1/1)	Archibald Speirs	
Richmond (Yorkshire) (seat 1/2)	Dudley Long North	Whig
Richmond (Yorkshire) (seat 2/2)	Robert Chaloner	Whig
Ripon (seat 1/2)	Frederick John Robinson	Tory
Ripon (seat 2/2)	George Gipps	Tory
Rochester (seat 1/2)	John Calcraft	Whig
Rochester (seat 2/2)	Sir James Boulden Thompson – took office Replaced by James Barnett 1816	
County Roscommon (seat 1/2)	Arthur French	Whig
County Roscommon (seat 2/2)	Hon. Stephen Mahon	Whig
Ross-shire (seat 1/1)	William Frederick Mackenzie – died Replaced by Charles Mackenzie Fraser 1814	
Roxburghshire (seat 1/1)	Viscount Melgund – succeeded to peerage Replaced by Alexander Don 1814	
Rutland (seat 1/2)	Charles Noel Noel – resigned Replaced by Sir Gerard Noel Noel 1814	Tory
Rutland (seat 2/2)	Sir Gilbert Heathcote, Bt	Whig
Rye (seat 1/2)	Thomas Phillipps Lamb – resigned Replaced by John Maberly	
Rye (seat 2/2)	Sir Henry Sullivan – sat for Lincoln; Replaced by Charles Wetherell 1812 – sat for Shaftesbury; Replaced by Richard Arkwright 1813	
== S ==
St Albans (seat 1/2)	Joseph Thompson Halsey – died Replaced by William Tierney Robarts 1818	Whig; Whig
St Albans (seat 2/2)	Christopher Smith	Tory
St Germans (seat 1/2)	William Henry Pringle	Tory
St Germans (seat 2/2)	Henry Goulburn	Tory
St Ives (seat 1/2)	William Pole-Tylney-Long-Wellesley	Tory
St Ives (seat 2/2)	Sir Walter Stirling, 1st Baronet	
St Mawes (seat 1/2)	Scrope Bernard	Tory
St Mawes (seat 2/2)	William Shipley – resigned Replaced by Francis Horner 1813 – died Replaced by Joseph Phillimore 1817	Tory; Whig
Salisbury (seat 1/2)	Viscount Folkestone	
Salisbury (seat 2/2)	William Hussey – died Replaced by George Purefoy-Jervoise 1813	
Saltash (seat 1/2)	Matthew Russell	Whig
Saltash (seat 2/2)	Michael George Prendergast	
Sandwich (seat 1/2)	Joseph Marryat	
Sandwich (seat 2/2)	Sir Joseph Sydney Yorke	
Scarborough (seat 1/2)	Charles Manners Sutton	Tory
Scarborough (seat 2/2)	Hon. Edmund Phipps	Tory
Seaford (seat 1/2)	Charles Rose Ellis	Tory
Seaford (seat 2/2)	John Leach – resigned Replaced by Sir Charles Cockerell 1816	Tory; Whig
Selkirkshire (seat 1/1)	William Eliott-Lockhart	
Shaftesbury (seat 1/2)	Richard Bateman-Robson – unseated on petition Replaced by Charles Wetherell 1813	Whig; Tory
Shaftesbury (seat 2/2)	Hudson Gurney – unseated on petition Replaced by Edward Kerrison 1813	Whig; Tory
Shrewsbury (seat 1/2)	Henry Grey Bennet	Whig
Shrewsbury (seat 2/2)	Sir Rowland Hill – ennobled Replaced by Richard Lyster 1814	Tory; Tory
Shropshire (seat 1/2)	John Kynaston	
Shropshire (seat 2/2)	John Cotes	
Sligo	George Canning – sat for Petersfield; Replaced by Joshua Spencer 1813 – took office Replaced by Sir Brent Spencer 1815	Tory - -
County Sligo (seat 1/2)	Edward Synge Cooper	Tory
County Sligo (seat 2/2)	Charles O'Hara	Tory
Somerset (seat 1/2)	William Gore-Langton	Whig
Somerset (seat 2/2)	William Dickinson	Tory
Southampton (seat 1/2)	George Henry Rose – took office Replaced by William Chamberlayne 1818	
Southampton (seat 2/2)	Arthur Atherley	
Southwark (seat 1/2)	Henry Thornton – died Replaced by Charles Barclay 1815	Independent
Southwark (seat 2/2)	Charles Calvert	Whig
Stafford (seat 1/2)	Ralph Benson	
Stafford (seat 2/2)	Thomas Wilson	
Staffordshire (seat 1/2)	Edward Littleton	Tory
Staffordshire (seat 2/2)	Lord Granville Leveson Gower – ennobled Replaced by Earl Gower 1815	Whig
Stamford (seat 1/2)	The Lord Henniker	Tory
Stamford (seat 2/2)	Evan Foulkes	Tory
Steyning (seat 1/2)	James Lloyd	Whig
Steyning (seat 2/2)	Sir John Aubrey	Whig
Stirling Burghs (seat 1/1)	Alexander Campbell	
Stirlingshire (seat 1/1)	Sir Charles Edmonstone	
Stockbridge (seat 1/2)	Joseph Foster Barham	Whig
Stockbridge (seat 2/2)	George Porter	Whig
Sudbury (seat 1/2)	Sir John Coxe Hippisley	
Sudbury (seat 2/2)	Charles Wyatt	
Suffolk (seat 1/2)	Sir William Rowley, Bt	
Suffolk (seat 2/2)	Thomas Gooch	
Surrey (seat 1/2)	Sir Thomas Sutton – died Replaced by Samuel Thornton 1813	Tory; Tory
Surrey (seat 2/2)	George Holme Sumner	Tory
Sussex (seat 1/2)	Sir Godfrey Webster, Bt	Tory
Sussex (seat 2/2)	Walter Burrell	
Sutherland (seat 1/1)	James Macdonald – resigned Replaced by George Macpherson Grant 1816	Tory
== T ==
Tain Burghs (seat 1/1)	Sir Hugh Innes, Bt	
Tamworth (seat 1/2)	Lord Charles Townshend	
Tamworth (seat 2/2)	Sir Robert Peel	Tory
Taunton (seat 1/2)	Alexander Baring	
Taunton (seat 2/2)	Henry Powell Collins	
Tavistock (seat 1/2)	Lord William Russell	Whig
Tavistock (seat 2/2)	Richard Fitzpatrick – died Replaced by Lord John Russell 1813– resigned Replaced by Lord Robert Spencer 1817	Whig; Whig; Whig
Tewkesbury (seat 1/2)	John Edmund Dowdeswell	Tory
Tewkesbury (seat 2/2)	John Martin	Whig
Thetford (seat 1/2)	Lord John FitzRoy	
Thetford (seat 2/2)	Thomas Creevey	
Thirsk (seat 1/2)	William Frankland – resigned Replaced by Robert Frankland 1815	Whig; Whig
Thirsk (seat 2/2)	Robert Greenhill-Russell	Whig
County Tipperary (seat 1/2)	Hon. Montagu James Mathew	Whig
County Tipperary (seat 2/2)	Hon. Francis Aldborough Prittie	Whig
Tiverton (seat 1/2)	William Fitzhugh	Tory
Tiverton (seat 2/2)	Hon. Richard Ryder	Tory
Totnes (seat 1/2)	Ayshford Wise	
Totnes (seat 2/2)	Thomas Peregrine Courtenay	
Tralee	Henry Arthur Herbert – resigned Replaced by James Evan Baillie 1813	Whig; Whig
Tregony (seat 1/2)	Alexander Cray Grant	Tory
Tregony (seat 2/2)	William Holmes	Tory
Truro (seat 1/2)	Sir George Warrender, Bt	Tory
Truro (seat 2/2)	John Lemon – died Replaced by George Dashwood 1814	Whig; Tory
County Tyrone (seat 1/2)	John Stewart	Tory
County Tyrone (seat 2/2)	Hon. Thomas Knox	Tory
== W ==
Wallingford (seat 1/2)	William Hughes	Whig
Wallingford (seat 2/2)	Ebenezer Fuller Maitland	Tory
Wareham (seat 1/2)	Robert Gordon	
Wareham (seat 2/2)	Theodore Henry Broadhead	
Warwick (seat 1/2)	Charles Mills	
Warwick (seat 2/2)	Lord Brooke – succeeded to peerage Replaced by Sir Charles John Greville 1816	Tory; Tory
Warwickshire (seat 1/2)	Dugdale Stratford Dugdale	
Warwickshire (seat 2/2)	Charles Mordaunt	
Waterford	Sir John Newport, Bt	Tory
County Waterford (seat 1/2)	Sir William Beresford – ennobled Replaced by Lord George Thomas Beresford 1814	Tory; Tory
County Waterford (seat 2/2)	Richard Power I – died Replaced by Richard Power II 1814	- Whig
Wells (seat 1/2)	Charles William Taylor	Whig
Wells (seat 2/2)	Clement Tudway – died Replaced by John Paine Tudway 1815	Tory
Wendover (seat 1/2)	Abel Smith	Tory
Wendover (seat 2/2)	George Smith	Whig
Wenlock (seat 1/2)	John Simpson	
Wenlock (seat 2/2)	Cecil Forester	
Weobley (seat 1/2)	Viscount St. Asaph – died Replaced by James Lenox William Naper 1813	
Weobley (seat 2/2)	William Lennox Bathurst – took office Replaced by Lord Frederick Cavendish Bentinck 1816	
West Looe (seat 1/2)	Charles Buller – resigned Replaced by Henry William Fitzgerald De Ros 1816	
West Looe (seat 2/2)	Anthony Buller – took office Replaced by Charles Hulse 1816	
Westbury (seat 1/2)	Benjamin Hall – resigned Replaced by Ralph Franco 1814	Tory
Westbury (seat 2/2)	Benjamin Shaw	
County Westmeath (seat 1/2)	Hon. Hercules Robert Pakenham	Tory
County Westmeath	Gustavus Hume Rochfort	Tory
Westminster (seat 1/2)	Francis Burdett	Whig
Westminster (seat 2/2)	Lord Cochrane – expelled and re-elected 1814	Whig
Westmorland (seat 1/2)	Henry Cecil Lowther	Tory
Westmorland (seat 2/2)	The Lord Muncaster – died Replaced by Viscount Lowther 1813	Tory; Tory
Wexford	Richard Nevill – resigned Replaced by John Fish 1813 – resigned Replaced by Richard Nevill 1814	Tory; Tory; Tory
County Wexford (seat 1/2)	Robert Carew	Whig
County Wexford (seat 2/2)	Sir Frederick Flood, Bt	Whig
Weymouth and Melcombe Regis (seat 1/4)	Sir John Murray	Tory
Weymouth and Melcombe Regis (seat 2/4)	John Broadhurst – unseated on petition Replaced by Viscount Cranborne 1813; Replaced by Adolphus John Dalrymple 1817	
Weymouth and Melcombe Regis (seat 3/4)	Thomas Wallace – unseated on petition Replaced by Christopher Idle	- Tory
Weymouth and Melcombe Regis (seat 4/4)	Henry Trail – unseated on petition Replaced by Masterton Ure 1813	- Tory
Whitchurch (seat 1/2)	William Brodrick	
Whitchurch (seat 2/2)	William Augustus Townshend – died Replaced by Horatio George Powys Townshend 1816	- Tory
County Wicklow (seat 1/2)	William Hoare Hume – died Replaced by Granville Leveson Proby 1816	- Whig
County Wicklow (seat 2/2)	William Tighe – died Replaced by George Ponsonby 1816 – died Replaced by William Parnell Hayes 1817	- Whig -
Wigan (seat 1/2)	John Hodson	Tory
Wigan (seat 2/2)	Sir Robert Holt Leigh	Tory
Wigtown Burghs (seat 1/1)	James Henry Keith Stewart	Tory
Wigtownshire (seat 1/1)	Sir William Stewart – resigned Replaced by James Hunter Blair 1816	
Wilton (seat 1/2)	Ralph Sheldon	
Wilton (seat 2/2)	Charles Herbert – died Replaced by Viscount FitzHarris 1816	
Wiltshire (seat 1/2)	Paul Methuen	Whig
Wiltshire (seat 2/2)	Richard Godolphin Long	
Winchelsea (seat 1/2)	William John Frederick Vane Powlett – resigned Replaced by Henry Peter Brougham 1815	Whig; Whig
Winchelsea (seat 2/2)	Calverley Bewicke – died Replaced by Viscount Barnard 1816	Whig; Whig
Winchester (seat 1/2)	Sir Henry St John-Mildmay, Bt	
Winchester (seat 2/2)	Richard Meyler – died Replaced by James Henry Leigh 1818	
Windsor (seat 1/2)	Edward Disbrowe	Tory
Windsor (seat 2/2)	John Ramsbottom	Whig
Woodstock (seat 1/2)	Sir Henry Dashwood, Bt	Tory
Woodstock (seat 2/2)	William Thornton – resigned Replaced by George Eden 1813– succeeded to peerage Replaced by William Thornton 1814	
Wootton Bassett (seat 1/2)	James Kibblewhite – resigned Replaced by Richard Ellison 1813	Whig –
Wootton Bassett (seat 2/2)	John Attersoll – resigned Replaced by Robert Rickards 1813 – resigned Replaced by William Taylor Money 1816	Whig - -
Worcester (seat 1/2)	William Gordon	Tory
Worcester (seat 2/2)	Abraham Robarts – died Replaced by Viscount Deerhurst 1816	Whig; Tory
Worcestershire (seat 1/2)	William Lyttelton	
Worcestershire (seat 2/2)	Viscount Elmley – succeeded to peerage Replaced by Henry Beauchamp Lygon 1816	
Wycombe (seat 1/2)	Sir Thomas Baring, Bt	Tory
Wycombe (seat 2/2)	Sir John Dashwood-King, Bt	Tory
== Y ==
Yarmouth (Isle of Wight) (seat 1/2)	Richard Wellesley – resigned Replaced by Alexander Maconochie 1817	- Tory
Yarmouth (Isle of Wight) (seat 2/2)	Sir Henry Conyngham Montgomery – resigned Replaced by John Leslie Foster 1816	- Tory
York (seat 1/2)	Lawrence Dundas	Whig
York (seat 2/2)	Sir Mark Masterman-Sykes	Whig
Yorkshire (seat 1/2)	Viscount Milton	Whig
Yorkshire (seat 2/2)	Hon. Henry Lascelles	Tory
Youghal (seat 1/1)	Sir John Keane	Tory

== By-elections ==
- List of United Kingdom by-elections (1806–18)

== See also ==
- List of parliaments of the United Kingdom
- Unreformed House of Commons
