= Christopher Idle (politician) =

British politician (1771–1819)

Christopher Idle (1771 – 8 March 1819) was a British politician. He was a Member of Parliament for Weymouth and Melcombe Regis from 1813 to 1818.

Idle was born in Penrith, Cumbria, and was elected to parliament in a by-election on 9 June 1813, after the previous election in October 1812 had been declared void. He was granted leave of absence in 1817 for health reasons, and did not seek re-election in 1818.

Preceded by John Murray; Thomas Wallace; John Broadhurst; Henry Trail	Member of Parliament for Weymouth; 1813–1818; With: John Murray; Viscount Cranborne; Masterton Ure	Succeeded by Masterton Ure; Thomas Wallace; Fowell Buxton; John Gordon
