= James Gascoyne-Cecil, 2nd Marquess of Salisbury =

British politician

The Most Honourable The Marquess of Salisbury KG PC
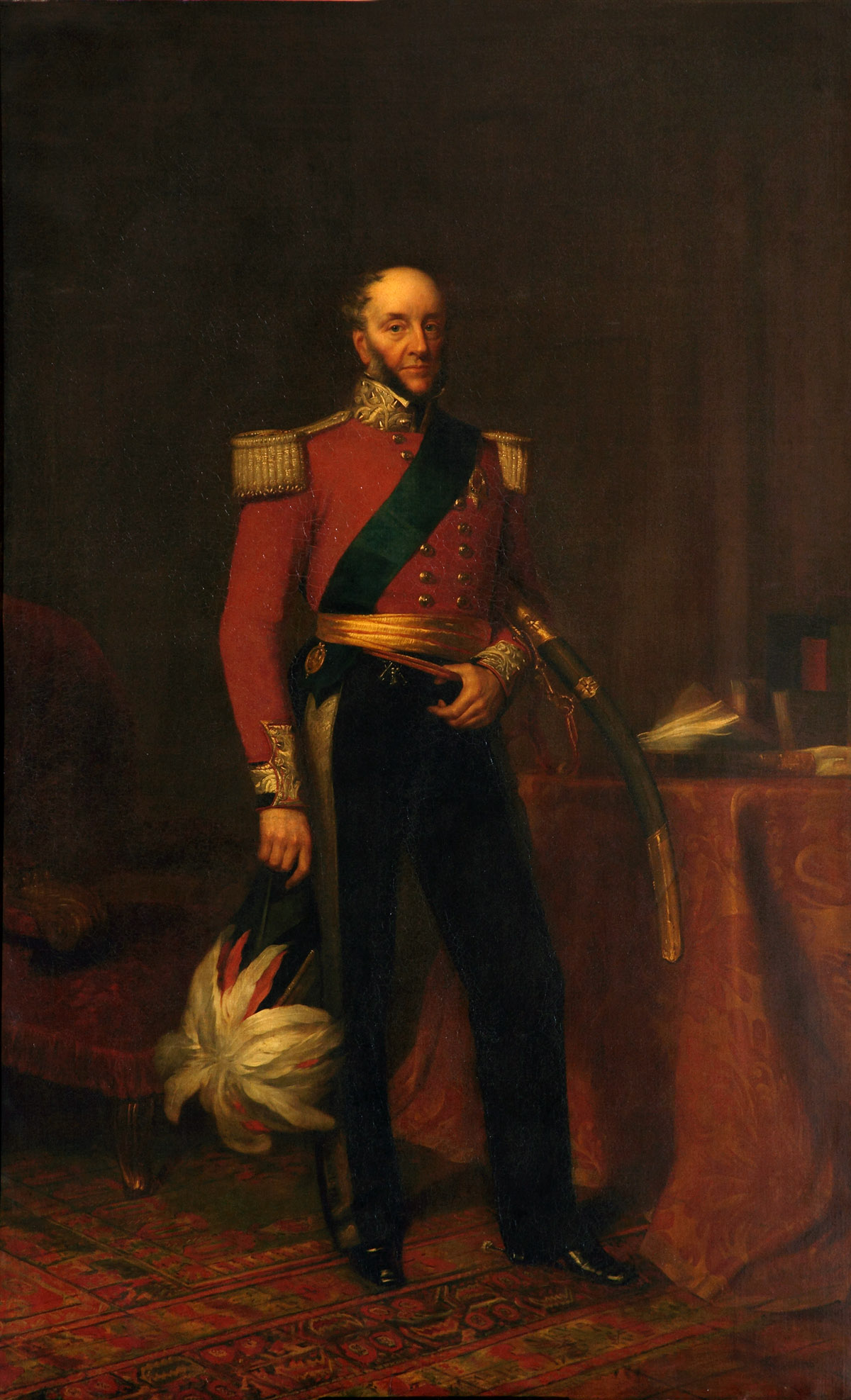

Lord President of the Council
- In office 26 February 1858 – 11 June 1859
- Monarch: Victoria
- Prime Minister: The Earl of Derby
- Preceded by: The Earl Granville
- Succeeded by: The Earl Granville

Lord Keeper of the Privy Seal
- In office 27 February 1852 – 17 December 1852
- Monarch: Victoria
- Prime Minister: The Earl of Derby
- Preceded by: The Earl of Minto
- Succeeded by: The Duke of Argyll

Member of the House of Lords Lord Temporal
- In office 13 June 1823 – 12 April 1868; Hereditary peerage
- Preceded by: The 1st Marquess of Salisbury
- Succeeded by: The 3rd Marquess of Salisbury

Member of Parliament for Hertford
- In office 1817–1823
- Preceded by: Hon. Edward Spencer Cowper
- Succeeded by: Thomas Byron

Member of Parliament for Weymouth and Melcombe Regis
- In office 1813–1817
- Preceded by: Hon. Edward Spencer Cowper
- Succeeded by: Adolphus Dalrymple

Personal details
- Born: James Brownlow William Cecil; 17 April 1791
- Died: 12 April 1868 (aged 76)
- Party: Conservative
- Spouses: Frances Gascoyne (m. 1821; died 1839) Lady Mary Sackville-West (m. 1847)
- Children: 11, including Robert, Eustace, and Mary Arabella
- Parents: James Cecil, 1st Marquess of Salisbury; Lady Emily Mary Hill

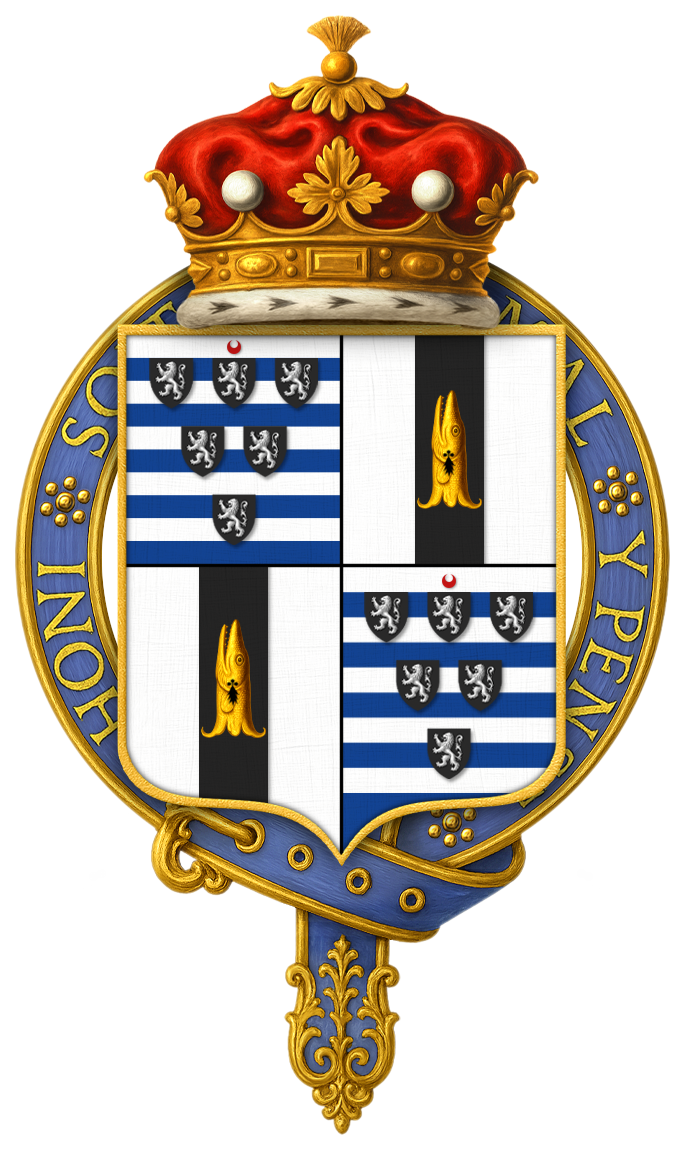
Quartered arms of James Gascoyne-Cecil, 2nd Marquess of Salisbury, KG, PC

James Brownlow William Gascoyne-Cecil, 2nd Marquess of Salisbury, KG, PC (born James Brownlow William Cecil, 17 April 1791 – 12 April 1868), styled Viscount Cranborne from birth until 1823, was a British Conservative politician. He held office under the Earl of Derby as Lord Privy Seal in 1852 and Lord President of the Council between 1858 and 1859. He was the father of Robert Gascoyne-Cecil, 3rd Marquess of Salisbury, who three times became Prime Minister of the United Kingdom, and grandfather of Arthur Balfour, who also served as Prime Minister.

== Background ==
Salisbury was the son of James Cecil, 1st Marquess of Salisbury, and Lady Emily Hill, daughter of Wills Hill, 1st Marquess of Downshire.

== Political career ==
Salisbury entered the House of Commons in 1813 as Member of Parliament for Weymouth and Melcombe Regis, a seat he held until 1817, and then sat for Hertford between 1817 and 1823.

In the latter year, he succeeded his father in the marquessate and entered the House of Lords. He served in the Earl of Derby's first two cabinets: as Lord Privy Seal in 1852 and as Lord President of the Council between 1858 and 1859. He was sworn of the Privy Council in 1826 and made a Knight of the Garter in 1842.

Apart from his political career he also served as titular Lord Lieutenant of Middlesex between 1841 and 1868, and followed his father as colonel of the Hertfordshire Militia. During a period of unrest in 1830 he raised the South Hertfordshire Yeomanry Cavalry and commanded it with the rank of major. He was promoted to lieutenant-colonel the following year when the regiment was expanded. In 1847, however, he exchanged with his second-in-command, James Grimston, 2nd Earl of Verulam, and reverted to the rank of major.

== Family ==
Lord Salisbury was married twice. His first marriage was on 2 February 1821 to Frances Mary Gascoyne (born 25 January 1802, died 15 October 1839), daughter of Bamber Gascoyne of Childwall Hall, Lancashire, and his wife Sarah Bridget Frances Price. A biography of her by Carola Oman appeared in 1966. Upon marrying Frances, he added her surname to his own; subsequent Marquesses of Salisbury have therefore all borne the surname Gascoyne-Cecil. The couple had six children, including:

- James Emilius William Evelyn Gascoyne-Cecil, Viscount Cranborne (29 October 1821 – 14 June 1865), died unmarried.
- Lady Mildred Arabella Charlotte Gascoyne-Cecil (21 October 1822 – 18 March 1881), married Alexander Beresford Hope and had children.
- Lord Arthur Gascoyne-Cecil (19 December 1823 – 25 April 1825), died in infancy.
- Lady Blanche Mary Harriet (5 March 1825 – 16 May 1872), married James Maitland Balfour; mother of Prime Minister Arthur Balfour.
- Robert Arthur Talbot Gascoyne-Cecil, 3rd Marquess of Salisbury (3 February 1830 – 22 August 1903), Prime Minister of the United Kingdom three times between 1885 and 1902, married Georgina Alderson and had children.
- Lieutenant-Colonel Lord Eustace Brownlow Henry Gascoyne-Cecil (24 April 1834 – 3 July 1921), married Lady Gertrude Louisa Scott and had children.

Lord Salisbury's second marriage, on 29 April 1847, was to Lady Mary Catherine Sackville-West, daughter of George Sackville-West, 5th Earl De La Warr, and Elizabeth Sackville-West, Countess De La Warr, with whom he had five children:

- Lord Sackville Arthur Cecil (16 March 1848 – 29 January 1898), died unmarried.
- Lady Mary Arabella Arthur Cecil (26 April 1850 – 18 August 1903), married Alan Stewart, 10th Earl of Galloway.
- Lady Margaret Elizabeth Cecil (1850 – 11 March 1919), died unmarried.
- Lord Arthur Cecil (3 July 1851– 16 July 1913), married Elizabeth Ann Wilson and had children; married secondly, in 1902, Frederica von Klenck, daughter of diplomat Baron Otto von Klenck, of Gmunden, and his British-born wife née Stewart.
- Lieutenant-Colonel Lord Lionel Cecil (21 March 1853 – 13 January 1901), died unmarried.

Lord Salisbury died in April 1868, aged 76, and was succeeded as marquess by his third, eldest surviving son, Robert. The Marchioness of Salisbury died in December 1900.

Parliament of the United Kingdom
Preceded by Sir John Murray; Thomas Wallace; John Broadhurst; Henry Trail	Member of Parliament for Weymouth and Melcombe Regis; 1813–1817; With: John Murray; Masterton Ure; Christopher Idle	Succeeded by John Murray; Masterton Ure; Christopher Idle; Adolphus Dalrymple
Preceded by Edward Cowper; Nicolson Calvert	Member of Parliament for Hertford; 1817–1823; With: Nicolson Calvert	Succeeded by Nicolson Calvert; Thomas Byron
Political offices
Preceded by The Earl of Minto	Lord Privy Seal; 1852	Succeeded by The Duke of Argyll
Preceded by The Earl Granville	Lord President of the Council; 1858–1859	Succeeded by The Earl Granville
Honorary titles
Preceded by The Duke of Portland	Lord Lieutenant of Middlesex; 1841–1868	Succeeded by The Duke of Wellington
Peerage of Great Britain
Preceded by James Cecil	Marquess of Salisbury; 1823–1868	Succeeded by Robert Gascoyne-Cecil
