= Thomas Wallace, 1st Baron Wallace =

English politician and peer

The Right Honourable The Lord Wallace PC DCL FRSE
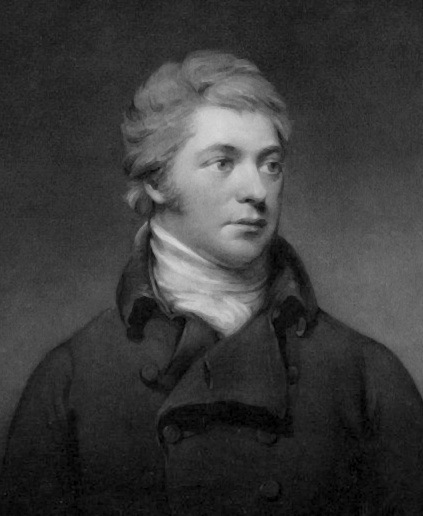

Vice-President of the Board of Trade
- In office 1818–1823
- Preceded by: F. J. Robinson
- Succeeded by: Charles Grant

Personal details
- Born: 1768
- Died: 23 February 1844 (aged 75–76)
- Party: Tory
- Parent: James Wallace (father)
- Education: Eton College
- Alma mater: Christ Church, Oxford

Thomas Wallace, 1st Baron Wallace, PC, FRSE (1768 – 23 February 1844) was an English politician and peer.

== Early life ==
Wallace was born at Brampton in 1768, the son of James Wallace (1729–1783), a barrister who served as Solicitor General for England and Wales and as Attorney General to George III, and his wife, Elizabeth Simpson, the only daughter and sole heiress of Thomas Simpson Esq., of Carleton Hall, Cumberland.

He was educated at Eton College from 1777 to 1784. He then studied at Christ Church at Oxford University, graduating MA in 1790.

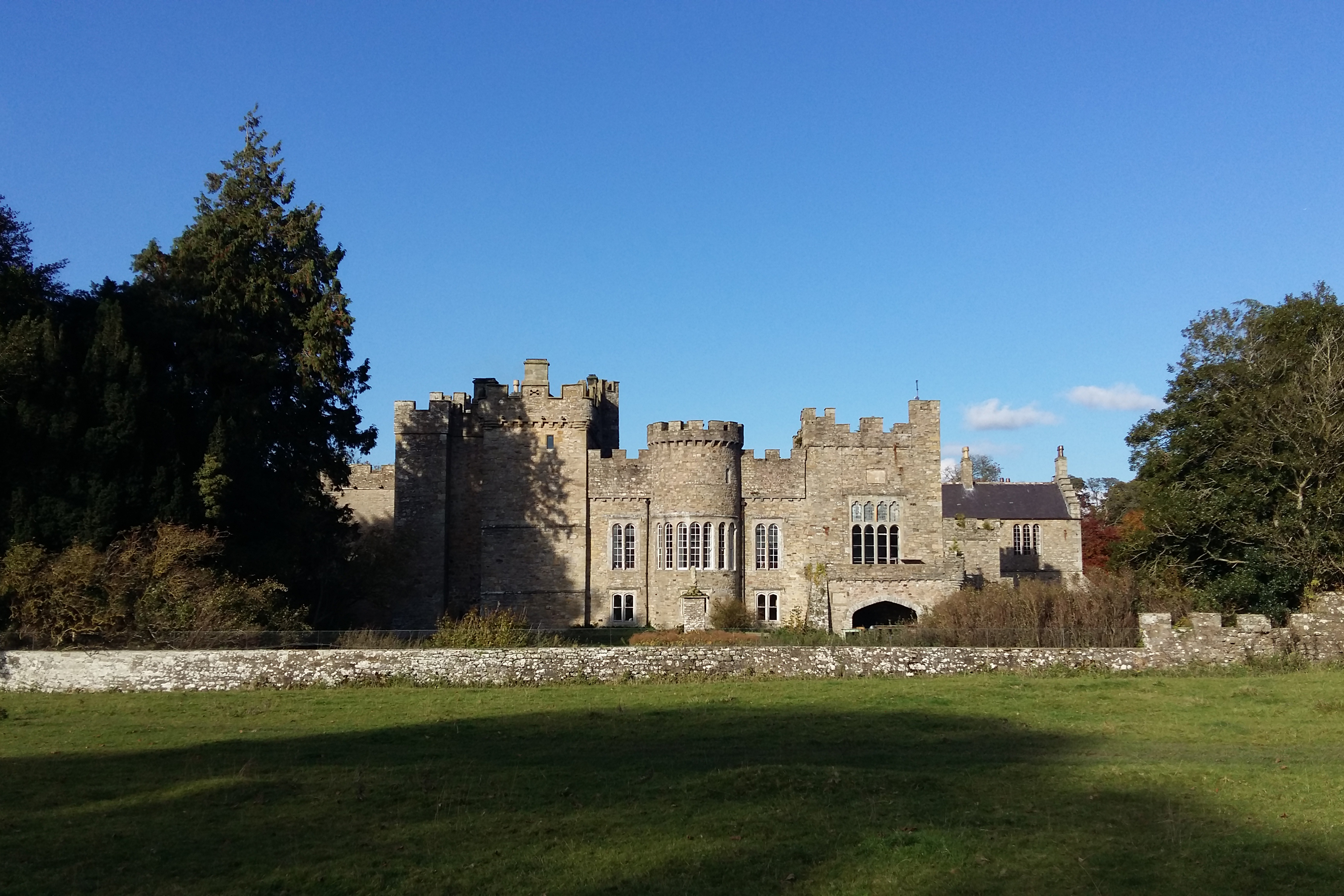
Featherstone Castle, Northumberland

Following the death of his father in 1783, he inherited (at age 15) Carleton Hall, which lies near Penrith, Cumbria.

In 1793 he was elected a Fellow of the Royal Society of Edinburgh. His proposers were Andrew Dalzell, Henry Brougham and Alexander Fraser Tytler.

He sold the Carleton estate in 1828 to John Cowper. He then acquired Featherstone Castle near Haltwhistle, Northumberland and remodelled it in the 1830s to a Gothic style.

== Political career ==
Wallace was a Member of Parliament (MP) for Grampound from 1790 to 1796, for Penryn from 1796 to 1802, for Hindon from 1802 to 1806, for Shaftesbury from 1807 to 1812, for Weymouth from 1812 to 1813, for Cockermouth from 1813 to 1818 and again for Weymouth from 1818 to 1828.

He was Lord of the Admiralty from 1797 to 1800.

He was appointed a Privy Counsellor in 1801 and ennobled as Baron Wallace, of Knaresdale in the County of Northumberland, on 2 February 1828.

He was a member of the Board of Control from 1807 to 1816 (responsible for overseeing the British East India Company), and Vice-President of the Board of Trade from 1818 to 1823. From 1823 to 1827 he was Master of the Mint.

== Personal life ==
In 1814 Baron Wallace, aged 46, married Lady Jane Hope (1766-1829), Viscountess Melville (widow of Henry Dundas, 1st Viscount Melville), daughter of John Hope, 2nd Earl of Hopetoun. Lady Jane died in June 1829. Lady Jane was then 48 and well beyond child-bearing years, even had she been able (she had no children by her first marriage).

Lord Wallace survived her by 15 years and died at Featherstone on 23 February 1844. Having no children, the barony died with him.

== Arms ==
Coat of arms of Thomas Wallace, 1st Baron Wallace
Crest Out of a ducal coronet Or an ostrich’s head and neck Proper holding a horseshoe in the beak. Escutcheon Gules a lion rampant Argent within a bordue compony of the second and Azure. Supporters Dexter a lion per bend dove-tailed sinister Sable and Or murally crowned and charged on the shoulder with a cross-flory Gold; sinister an antelope Proper ducally gorged and chained and charged on the shoulder as the dexter.

== Sources ==
- Leigh Rayment's Peerage Pages
- Leigh Rayment's Historical List of MPs

Parliament of Great Britain
Preceded by John Cocks; Francis Baring	Member of Parliament for Grampound; 1790–1796; With: Jeremiah Crutchley	Succeeded by Bryan Edwards; Robert Sewell
Preceded by Sir Francis Basset; Richard Glover	Member of Parliament for Penryn; 1796–1800; With: William Meeke	Succeeded by Parliament of the United Kingdom
Parliament of the United Kingdom
Preceded by Parliament of Great Britain	Member of Parliament for Penryn; 1801–1802; With: William Meeke	Succeeded by Sir Stephen Lushington; Sir John Nicholl
Preceded by James Wildman; Matthew Gregory Lewis	Member of Parliament for Hindon; 1802–1806; With: John Pedley	Succeeded by William Beckford; Benjamin Hobhouse
Preceded by Edward Loveden Loveden; Home Riggs Popham	Member of Parliament for Shaftesbury; 1807–1812; With: Edward Loveden Loveden	Succeeded by Richard Bateman-Robson; Hudson Gurney
Preceded by Sir John Murray, Bt; Richard Steward; Charles Adams; Joseph Hume	Member of Parliament for Weymouth; 1812–1813; With: Sir John Murray, Bt; John Broadhurst; Henry Trail	Succeeded by Sir John Murray, Bt; Viscount Cranborne; Christopher Idle; Masterton Ure
Preceded by Augustus Foster; Viscount Lowther	Member of Parliament for Cockermouth; 1813–1818; With: Viscount Lowther 1813–1816; John Lowther 1816–1818	Succeeded by Sir John Beckett, Bt; John Lowther
Preceded by Sir John Murray, Bt; Adolphus Dalrymple; Christopher Idle; Masterton Ure	Member of Parliament for Weymouth; 1818–1828; With: William Williams 1818–1826; John Gordon 1826–1828; Fowell Buxton 1818–1832; Masterton Ure 1813–1832	Succeeded by John Gordon; Fowell Buxton; Edward Sugden; Masterton Ure
Political offices
Preceded by Hon. F. J. Robinson	Vice-President of the Board of Trade; 1818–1823	Succeeded by Charles Grant
Peerage of the United Kingdom
New creation	Baron Wallace; 1828–1844	Extinct
