= John Broadhurst (MP) =

British Whig politician

Member of Parliament for Sudbury
- In office 19 June 1818 – 7 March 1820 Serving with William Heygate
- Preceded by: Charles Wyatt and Sir John Hippisley
- Succeeded by: Charles Augustus Tulk

Member of Parliament for Hedon
- In office 4 December 1813 – 18 June 1818 Serving with Anthony Browne
- Preceded by: George Johnstone
- Succeeded by: Edmund Turton and Robert Farrand

Member of Parliament for Weymouth and Melcombe Regis
- In office 27 October 1812 – 9 June 1813 Serving with Thomas Wallace; Henry Trail and General Sir John Murray
- Preceded by: Charles Adams, Richard Steward and Joseph Hume
- Succeeded by: Christopher Idle; Viscount Cranborne and Masterton Ure

Personal details
- Born: 1778
- Died: 15 September 1861 (aged 82–83)
- Party: Whig
- Education: Eton College

Military service
- Allegiance: United Kingdom
- Battles/wars: Peninsular War

John Broadhurst (1778 – 15 September 1861) was a Whig politician and the Member of Parliament (MP) for Weymouth and Melcombe Regis between October 1812 and June 1813, Hedon from December 1813 to June 1818 and Sudbury from June 1818 to March 1820.

== Early life ==
Broadhurst attended Eton College. He was a soldier, and fought in the Peninsular War and was present at the retreat of Corunna.

== Parliamentary career ==
Broadhurst's election as MP for Waymouth and Melcombe Regis was petitioned and overturned, with his election being declared void. Thomas Wallace, Henry Trail and Broadhurst was declared void after being found to have violated the Exemptions of Apothecaries Act 1694, and a by-election was held.

He was elected to Hedon in December 1813 in a by-election following the death of George Johnstone and then went on to stand for Sudbury in the 1818 general election, serving until the 1820 general election where he did not seek re-election.

Broadhurst never had a recorded speech in Parliament's Hansard during his time as an MP, however, The History of Parliament states that his only known speech was on 7 May 1818 where "he opposed a clause proposed for the Poor Law Amendment Bill which would take pauper children out of their parents’ care."
