= Lord William FitzGerald =

Irish politician

Member of Parliament for County Kildare
- In office 23 March 1814 – 1831

Personal details
- Born: 4 January 1793
- Died: 8 December 1864 (aged 71) Dublin
- Party: Whig
- Education: Eton College
- Alma mater: Christ Church, Oxford

Lord William Charles O'Brien FitzGerald (4 January 1793 – 8 December 1864) was an Irish politician. He was a long-serving Member of Parliament from County Kildare and was a member of the Whig opposition to the Liverpool ministry where he advocated for Catholic emancipation.

== See also ==
- List of MPs elected in the 1820 United Kingdom general election
- List of MPs elected in the 1812 United Kingdom general election
- List of MPs elected in the 1818 United Kingdom general election
