= John Bolland (MP) =

English MP (1742-1829)

Member of Parliament for Bletchingley
- In office 24 November 1814 – 15 June 1818

Personal details
- Born: 1742
- Died: 7 June 1829 (aged 86–87)
- Relations: William Reid (son-in-law)

John Bolland (1742 – 7 June 1829) was an English politician. He served as a Member of Parliament (MP) for Bletchingley.

== Family ==
Bolland married Elizabeth Gipps and had one daughter Sarah Bolland who went on to marry William Reid.

== See also ==
- List of MPs elected in the 1812 United Kingdom general election
