= Sir Thomas Freeman-Heathcote, 4th Baronet =

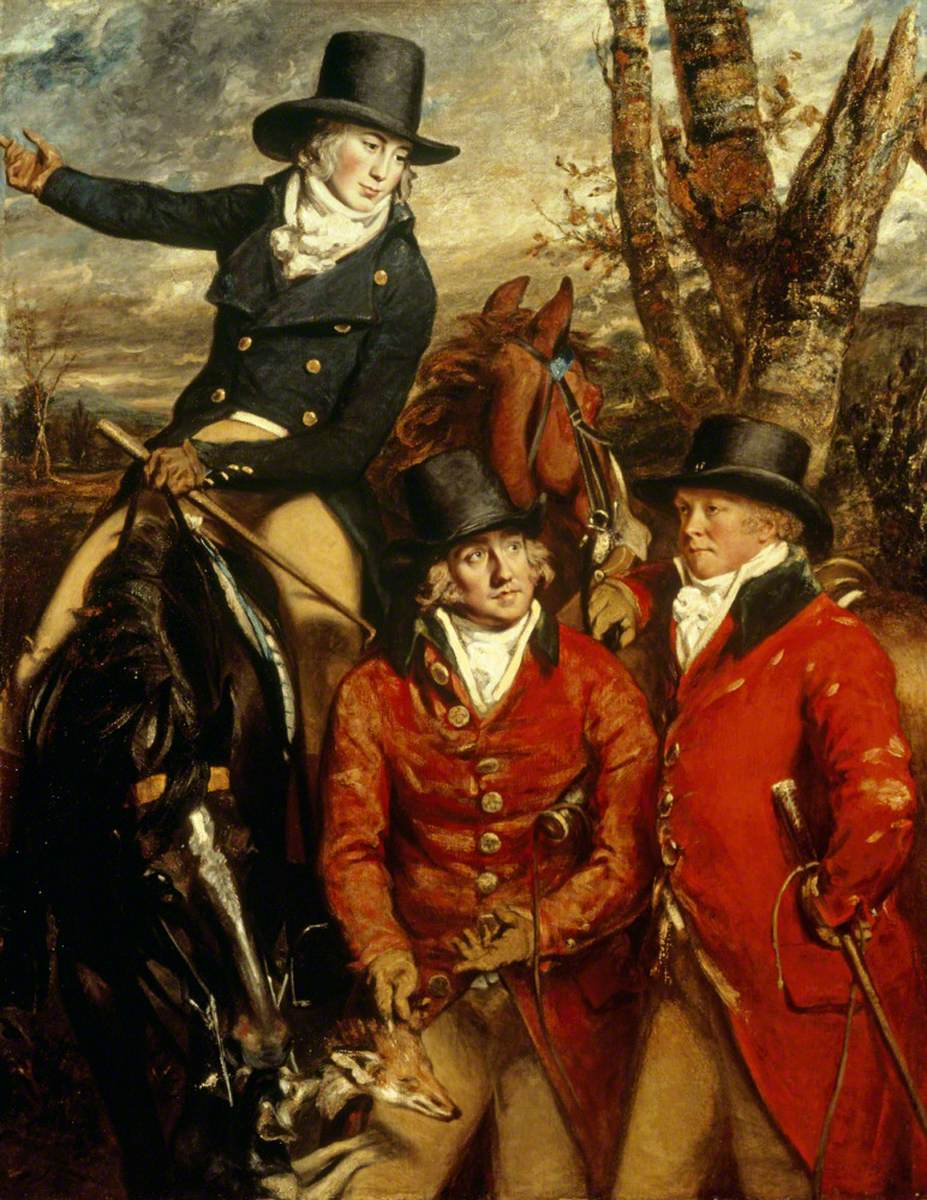

Member of Parliament for Bletchingley
- In office 1807 – December 1808

Member of Parliament for Hampshire
- In office 19 December 1808 – 1820

Personal details
- Born: 3 September 1769
- Died: 21 February 1825 (aged 55)
- Parent: Sir William Heathcote, 3rd Baronet

Sir Thomas Freeman-Heathcote, 4th Baronet (3 September 1769 – 21 February 1825) was an English politician. He served as a Member of Parliament (MP).

== Biography ==
Born into the Heathcote family, he was MP for Bletchingley and Hampshire.

== See also ==
- List of MPs elected in the 1807 United Kingdom general election
- List of MPs elected in the 1812 United Kingdom general election
- List of MPs elected in the 1818 United Kingdom general election
