= James Kibblewhite =

Member of the Parliament of the United Kingdom for Wootton Bassett
- In office 1811 – March 1812

Personal details
- Born: 10 June 1770 Lydiard Millicent, Wiltshire
- Died: 3 November 1845 (aged 75) West Hampstead, Middlesex (now Greater London)
- Party: Whig

James Kibblewhite (10 June 1770 – 3 November 1845) was an English politician.
