= James Cocks (1773–1854) =

James Cocks (14 August 1773 – January 1854) was the member of parliament for Reigate from 1808 to 1818, and from 1823 to 1831.
