= Benjamin Walsh (British politician) =

UK MP, stockbroker, and fraudster

Benjamin Walsh (c. 1775 – 1818) was an English stockbroker and member of parliament representing Wootton Bassett from 1808 to 1812.

In 1809 he was expelled from the London Stock Exchange for "gross and nefarious conduct". In 1812 he was convicted of defrauding Thomas Plumer of a considerable sum of money. Walsh was pardoned by the Prince Regent, but was expelled from the House of Commons. In 1813 Walsh purchased a Plymouth newspaper which subsequently failed in 1816.

One of his sons was Benjamin Dann Walsh who emigrated to the United States in 1838 and became a notable entomologist.
