= Thomas Hussey (Aylesbury MP) =

English politician

Thomas Hussey (1749–1824), of Rathkenny, County Meath and Fulmer, Buckinghamshire, was an English politician. He was the 19th Baron of Galtrim.

He married Mary Walpole, daughter of Horatio Walpole, 2nd Baron Walpole.

== Career ==
He was a Member (MP) of the Parliament of England for Aylesbury 14 February 1809 - November 1814.

Parliament of the United Kingdom
Preceded by George Cavendish; Sir George Nugent, Bt	Member of Parliament for Aylesbury; 1809–1814; With: Sir George Nugent, Bt to 1812; The Lord Nugent from 1812	Succeeded by The Lord Nugent; Charles Cavendish
