= Charles Adams (MP) =

English politician

- Born: 2 November 1753
- Died: 15 November 1821 (aged 68)
- Occupation: politician

Charles Adams (2 November 1753 – 15 November 1821) was a British politician who served as the Tory MP for Weymouth and Melcombe Regis between 1801 and 1812.

He voted against the Convention of Cintra.
