= Richard Augustus Tucker Steward =

English politician (1773–1842)

Member of Parliament for Weymouth and Melcombe Regis
- In office 26 April 1806 – 1812

Personal details
- Born: 1 February 1773 Nottington, Dorset
- Died: 25 March 1842 (aged 69)
- Party: Tory
- Relations: Gabriel Tucker Steward (brother)
- Parent: Gabriel Steward

Richard Augustus Tucker Steward (1 February 1773 – 25 March 1842) was an English politician who served as Member of Parliament for Weymouth and Melcombe Regis from 1806 to 1812.
