= Masterton Ure =

British politician and lawyer

Member of Parliament for Weymouth and Melcombe Regis
- In office 9 June 1813 – 3 December 1832
- Preceded by: Henry Trail
- Succeeded by: Sir Frederick Johnstone and Fowell Buxton

Personal details
- Born: 3 April 1777
- Died: 10 March 1863 (aged 85) Middlesex, London
- Party: Tory
- Education: University of Glasgow
- Occupation: Lawyer and politician

Masterton Ure (3 April 1777 – 10 March 1863) was a Scottish lawyer and Tory politician, serving as the Member of Parliament for Weymouth and Melcombe Regis.

== Early life ==
Ure was born to the Rev. Robert Ure, a minister in Airth, Stirling. He attended the University of Glasgow.

== Political career ==
Ure made his maiden speech on the topic of the West Indies on 9 March 1818.

Ure was opposed to Catholic emancipation, Jewish emancipation, parliamentary reform and was a supporter of slavery.

== Death ==
Ure died on 10 March 1863, aged 85, in Middlesex, London leaving his estate divided up between his nephews and nieces.

Parliament of the United Kingdom
Preceded by General Sir John Murray; John Broadhurst; Thomas Wallace; Henry Trail	Member of Parliament for Weymouth and Melcombe Regis; 1813-1832	Succeeded by Frederick Johnstone; Fowell Buxton
