= Henry Trail =

British politician

Member of Parliament for Weymouth and Melcombe Regis
- In office 27 October 1812 – 9 June 1813
- Preceded by: Joseph Hume
- Succeeded by: Masterton Ure

Personal details
- Born: 1775
- Died: 10 February 1835

Henry Trail (1755 - 10 February 1835) was the Member of Parliament for Weymouth and Melcombe Regis between October 1812 and June 1813.

== Parliamentary career ==
Trail's election was petitioned and overturned, with his election being declared void. Thomas Wallace, John Broadhurst and Trail was declared void after being found to have violated the Exemptions of Apothecaries Act 1694, and a by-election was held; Trail being the only one of the three never to return to Parliament.

Due to this, Trail made no speeches in the House of Commons during his time as an MP.

General Sir John Murray's election was not disturbed despite being of the same election.

== Personal life ==
His brother, James Trail, was the MP for Orford.
