= List of MPs elected in the 1806 United Kingdom general election =

1806–1807 Parliament of the United Kingdom
←	1802–1806 Parliament	1807–1812 Parliament	→
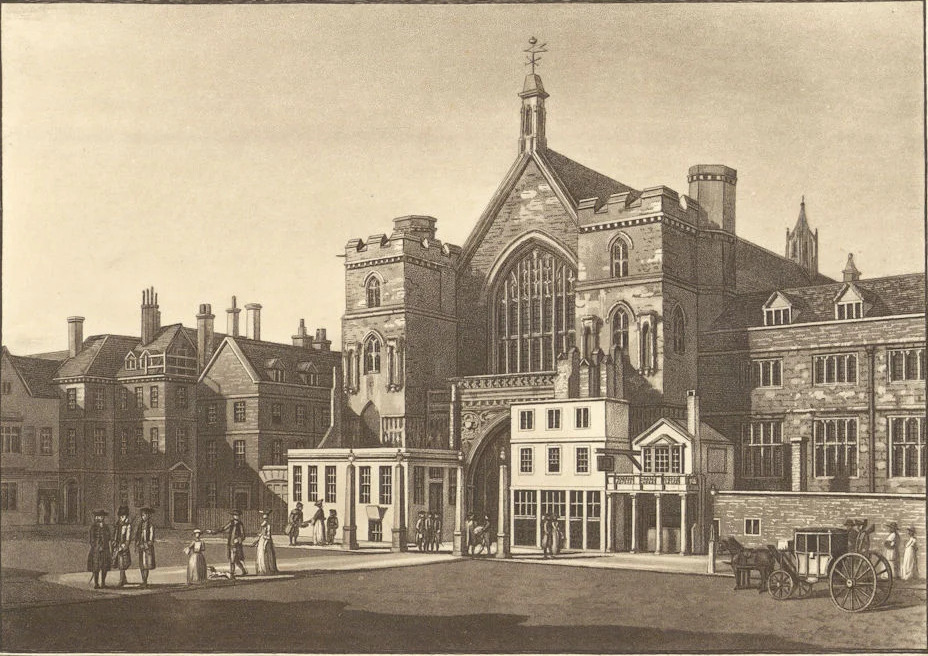
- The Palace of Westminster in 1808

Overview
- Legislative body: Parliament of the United Kingdom
- Jurisdiction: United Kingdom
- Meeting place: Palace of Westminster
- Term: 15 December 1806 – 27 April 1807
- Election: 1806 United Kingdom general election

Crown-in-Parliament George III

Sessions
- 1st: 15 December 1806 – 27 April 1807

This is a list of the MPs or members of Parliament elected to the House of Commons for the constituencies of the Parliament of the United Kingdom in the 1806 United Kingdom general election, the 3rd Parliament of the United Kingdom after the Union with Ireland. The 1806 general election ran from 29 October to 2 December. There were contests in 87 of the 380 constituencies. The parliamentary session ran from 15 December 1806 to 27 April 1807, lasting 138 days.

Table of contents:

A B C D E F G H I J K L M N O P Q R S T U V W X Y Z By-elections Changes

== A ==
Aberdeen Burghs (seat 1/1)	John Ramsay	
Aberdeenshire (seat 1/1)	James Ferguson	Tory
Abingdon (seat 1/1)	Thomas Metcalfe	Tory
Aldborough (seat 1/2)	Henry Fynes	Tory
Aldborough (seat 2/2)	Gilbert Jones	Tory
Aldeburgh (seat 1/2)	Sir John Aubrey, Bt.	Whig
Aldeburgh (seat 2/2)	John McMahon	Tory
Amersham (seat 1/2)	Thomas Drake Tyrwhitt-Drake	Tory
Amersham (seat 2/2)	Thomas Tyrwhitt-Drake	Tory
Andover (seat 1/2)	Thomas Assheton Smith I	Tory
Andover (seat 2/2)	Newton Fellowes	Whig
Anglesey (seat 1/1)	Sir Arthur Paget	Whig
Anstruther Easter Burghs (seat 1/1)	John Anstruther	Foxite Whig
County Antrim(seat 1/2)	Edmond Alexander MacNaghten	Tory
County Antrim (seat 2/2)	Hon. John Bruce Richard O'Neill	Tory
Appleby (seat 1/2)	Sir Philip Francis	Whig
Appleby (seat 2/2)	John Courtenay	
Argyllshire (seat 1/1)	Lord John Campbell	
Armagh (seat 1/1)	Patrick Duigenan	Tory
County Armagh (seat 1/2)	Hon. Archibald Acheson – Ennobled; Replaced by William Brownlow 1807	Tory; Tory
County Armagh (seat 2/2)	Hon. Henry Caulfeild	Whig
Arundel (seat 1/2)	Sir Arthur Piggott	
Arundel (seat 2/2)	Francis Wilder – Sat for Horsham; Replaced by Lord Lecale 1807	
Ashburton (seat 1/2)	Walter Palk	
Ashburton (seat 2/2)	Hon. Gilbert Elliot	Whig
Athlone (seat 1/1)	George Tierney	Whig
Aylesbury (seat 1/2)	George Nugent, 1st Bt.	
Aylesbury (seat 2/2)	George Henry Compton Cavendish	
Ayr Burghs (seat 1/1)	John Campbell II	
Ayrshire (seat 1/1)	Sir Hew Dalrymple-Hamilton	
== B ==
Banbury (seat 1/1)	William Praed	
Bandon	Hon. Courtenay Boyle	Tory
Banffshire (seat 1/1)	Sir William Grant	
Barnstaple (seat 1/2)	William Taylor	
Barnstaple (seat 2/2)	Viscount Ebrington	
Bath (seat 1/2)	Lord John Thynne	
Bath (seat 2/2)	John Palmer	
Beaumaris (seat 1/1)	The Lord Newborough	
Bedford (seat 1/2)	William Lee-Antonie	
Bedford (seat 2/2)	Samuel Whitbread	
Bedfordshire (seat 1/2)	John Osborn	Tory
Bedfordshire (seat 2/2)	Francis Pym	Whig
Belfast	James Edward May	Tory
Bere Alston (seat 1/2)	Hon. Josceline Percy	
Bere Alston (seat 2/2)	Lord Lovaine	
Berkshire (seat 1/2)	George Vansittart	Tory
Berkshire (seat 2/2)	Charles Dundas	Whig
Berwickshire (seat 1/1)	George Baillie	
Berwick-upon-Tweed (seat 1/2)	Sir John Callender, Bt	
Berwick-upon-Tweed (seat 2/2)	Alexander Tower	
Beverley (seat 1/2)	John Wharton	Whig
Beverley (seat 2/2)	Richard Vyse	
Bewdley (seat 1/1)	Miles Peter Andrews	
Bishops Castle (seat 1/2)	William Clive	
Bishops Castle (seat 2/2)	John Robinson	
Bletchingley (seat 1/2)	Josias Porcher – Sat for Dundalk; Replaced by John Alexander Bannerman 1807	
Bletchingley (seat 2/2)	William Kenrick	
Bodmin (seat 1/2)	William Wingfield	
Bodmin (seat 2/2)	Davies Giddy	
Boroughbridge (seat 1/2)	William Henry Clinton	Tory
Boroughbridge (seat 2/2)	Henry Dawkins	Tory
Bossiney (seat 1/2)	Hon. James Stuart-Wortley	
Bossiney (seat 2/2)	Henry Baring	
Boston (seat 1/2)	William Alexander Madocks	
Boston (seat 2/2)	Thomas Fydell I	
Brackley (seat 1/2)	Anthony Henderson	
Brackley (seat 2/2)	Robert Haldane Bradshaw	
Bramber (seat 1/2)	John Irving	
Bramber (seat 2/2)	Henry Jodrell	
Brecon (seat 1/1)	Sir Robert Salusbury, Bt	Tory
Breconshire (seat 1/1)	Thomas Wood	
Bridgnorth (seat 1/2)	Isaac Hawkins Browne	
Bridgnorth (seat 2/2)	Thomas Whitmore	
Bridgwater (seat 1/2)	Vere Poulett	
Bridgwater (seat 2/2)	John Langston	
Bridport (seat 1/2)	George Barclay	
Bridport (seat 2/2)	Sir Evan Nepean, Bt	
Bristol (seat 1/2)	The Lord Sheffield	
Bristol (seat 2/2)	Charles Bragge	
Buckingham (seat 1/2)	Sir William Young, 2nd Bt. – Resigned; Replaced by Sir John Borlase Warren 1807	
Buckingham (seat 2/2)	Thomas Grenville	
Buckinghamshire (seat 1/2)	Richard Temple Nugent Grenville, Earl Temple	
Buckinghamshire (seat 2/2)	Marquess of Titchfield	
Bury St Edmunds (seat 1/2)	Lord Charles FitzRoy	
Bury St Edmunds (seat 2/2)	The Lord Templetown	
Buteshire (seat 1/1)	James Stuart-Wortley-Mackenzie	
== C ==
Caernarvon Boroughs (seat 1/1)	Hon. Sir Charles Paget	
Caernarvonshire (seat 1/1)	Robert Williams	
Caithness (seat 0/0)	Alternated with Buteshire. No representation in 1806.	
Callington (seat 1/2)	William Wickham	
Callington (seat 2/2)	William Garrow	
Calne (seat 1/2)	Joseph Jekyll	
Calne (seat 2/2)	Osborne Markham	Whig
Cambridge (seat 1/2)	Edward Finch	Tory
Cambridge (seat 2/2)	Robert Manners	Tory
Cambridgeshire (seat 1/2)	Lord Charles Manners	
Cambridgeshire (seat 2/2)	Charles Philip Yorke	Tory
Cambridge University (seat 1/2)	Lord Henry Petty	Whig
Cambridge University (seat 2/2)	Earl of Euston	Whig
Camelford (seat 1/2)	Robert Adair	
Camelford (seat 2/2)	Viscount Maitland	
Canterbury (seat 1/2)	John Baker	Whig
Canterbury (seat 2/2)	James Simmons – Died; Replaced by Samuel Elias Sawbridge 1807	
Cardiff Boroughs (seat 1/1)	Lord William Stuart	Tory
Cardigan Boroughs (seat 1/1)	Hon. John Vaughan	
Cardiganshire (seat 1/1)	Thomas Johnes	
Carlisle (seat 1/2)	Walter Spencer Stanhope	Tory
Carlisle (seat 2/2)	John Christian Curwen	Whig
Carlow (seat 1/1)	Hon. Frederick John Robinson	
County Carlow (seat 1/2)	David Latouche	Whig
County Carlow (seat 2/2)	Walter Bagenal	Whig
Carmarthen (seat 1/1)	Vice-Admiral George Campbell	
Carmarthenshire (seat 1/1)	William Paxton	
Carrickfergus (seat 1/1)	Lord Spencer Stanley Chichester – Resigned; Replaced by James Craig 1807	Tory; Whig
Cashel (seat 1/1)	Viscount Primrose	Whig
Castle Rising (seat 1/2)	Richard Sharp	
Castle Rising (seat 2/2)	Charles Bagot-Chester	
County Cavan (seat 1/2)	Nathaniel Sneyd	Tory
County Cavan (seat 2/2)	John Maxwell-Barry	Tory
Cheshire (seat 1/2)	Davies Davenport	
Cheshire (seat 2/2)	Thomas Cholmondeley	
Chester (seat 1/2)	Richard Erle-Drax-Grosvenor	
Chester (seat 2/2)	Thomas Grosvenor	
Chichester (seat 1/2)	George White-Thomas	
Chichester (seat 2/2)	Thomas Steele	
Chippenham (seat 1/2)	Charles Brooke	
Chippenham (seat 2/2)	John Maitland	
Christchurch (seat 1/2)	William Sturges Bourne	Tory
Christchurch (seat 2/2)	George Rose	
Cirencester (seat 1/2)	Michael Hicks-Beach	
Cirencester (seat 2/2)	Joseph Cripps	
Clackmannanshire (seat 1/1)	George Abercromby	
County Clare (seat 1/2)	Hon. Francis Nathaniel Burton	
County Clare (seat 2/2)	Sir Edward O'Brien, Bt	
Clitheroe (seat 1/2)	Hon. John Cust	
Clitheroe (seat 2/2)	Hon. Robert Curzon	
Clonmel (seat 1/1)	Rt Hon. William Bagwell	Tory
Cockermouth (seat 1/2)	John Lowther – Sat for Cumberland; Replaced by Lord Binning 1807	Tory; Tory
Cockermouth (seat 2/2)	James Graham	Tory
Colchester (seat 1/2)	Robert Thornton	Tory
Colchester (seat 2/2)	William Tufnell	Whig
Coleraine (seat 1/1)	Sir George Fitzgerald Hill, Bt – Sat for Londonderry; Replaced by Walter Jones 1807	Tory; Tory
Corfe Castle (seat 1/2)	Nathaniel Bond	Whig
Corfe Castle (seat 2/2)	Henry Bankes	Tory
Cork (seat 1/2)	Hon. Christopher Hely-Hutchinson	Whig
Cork (seat 2/2)	Mountifort Longfield	Tory
County Cork (seat 1/2)	Viscount Boyle	Whig
County Cork (seat 2/2)	Hon. George Ponsonby	Whig
Cornwall (seat 1/2)	John Hearle Tremayne	
Cornwall (seat 2/2)	Sir William Lemon, Bt	
Coventry (seat 1/2)	William Mills	
Coventry (seat 2/2)	Peter Moore	
Cricklade (seat 1/2)	Lord Porchester	
Cricklade (seat 2/2)	Thomas Goddard	
Cromartyshire (seat 0/0)	Alternated with Nairnshire. No representation in 1806.	
Cumberland (seat 1/2)	Viscount Morpeth	
Cumberland (seat 2/2)	John Lowther	
== D ==
Dartmouth (seat 1/2)	Edmund Bastard	
Dartmouth (seat 2/2)	Arthur Howe Holdsworth	
Denbigh Boroughs (seat 1/1)	Robert Myddelton Biddulph	
Denbighshire (seat 1/1)	Sir Watkin Williams-Wynn, 5th Baronet	
Derby (seat 1/2)	William Cavendish	
Derby (seat 2/2)	Edward Coke – Resigned; Replaced by Thomas William Coke 1807	
Derbyshire (seat 1/2)	George Cavendish	Whig
Derbyshire (seat 2/2)	Edward Miller Mundy	Tory
Devizes (seat 1/2)	Joshua Smith	
Devizes (seat 2/2)	Thomas Grimston Estcourt	
Devon (seat 1/2)	John Pollexfen Bastard	Tory
Devon (seat 2/2)	Sir Lawrence Palk, Bt	
County Donegal (seat 1/2)	Henry Vaughan Brooke	Tory
County Donegal (seat 2/2)	Sir James Stewart, Bt	Tory
Dorchester (seat 1/2)	Hon. Cropley Ashley-Cooper	
Dorchester (seat 2/2)	Francis Fane	
Dorset (seat 1/2)	Edward Berkeley Portman	
Dorset (seat 2/2)	William Morton Pitt	
Dover (seat 1/2)	John Jackson	
Dover (seat 2/2)	Charles Jenkinson	
County Down (seat 1/2)	Hon. John Meade	
County Down (seat 2/2)	Francis Savage	
Downpatrick	Edward Southwell Ruthven	Whig
Downton (seat 1/2)	Hon. Bartholomew Bouverie	Whig
Downton (seat 2/2)	Hon. Duncombe Pleydell-Bouverie	Whig
Drogheda	Henry Meade Ogle	Tory
Droitwich (seat 1/2)	Thomas Foley	
Droitwich (seat 2/2)	Andrew Foley	
Dublin (seat 1/2)	Robert Shaw	Tory
Dublin (seat 2/2)	Rt Hon. Henry Grattan	Whig
County Dublin (seat 1/2)	Hans Hamilton	Tory
County Dublin (seat 2/2)	Frederick John Falkiner	Tory
Dublin University	Hon. George Knox	Tory
Dumfries Burghs (seat 1/1)	Henry Erskine	
Dumfriesshire (seat 1/1)	Sir William Johnstone Hope	
Dunbartonshire (seat 1/1)	Sir Charles Edmonstone, 2nd Bt	Tory
Dundalk	John Metge – Resigned; Replaced by Josias Porcher 1807	Tory; Tory
Dungannon	Hon. George Knox – Sat for Dublin University; Replaced by Viscount Hamilton 1807	Tory; Tory
Dungarvan	Hon. George Walpole	Whig
Dunwich (seat 1/2)	Snowdon Barne	
Dunwich (seat 2/2)	The Lord Huntingfield	
Durham (City of) (seat 1/2)	Richard Wharton	
Durham (City of) (seat 2/2)	Ralph John Lambton	
Durham (County) (seat 1/2)	Sir Thomas Liddell, Bt	
Durham (County) (seat 2/2)	Ralphe Milbanke	
Dysart Burghs (seat 1/1)	Sir Ronald Crauford Ferguson	Whig
== E ==
East Grinstead (seat 1/2)	Sir Henry Strachey	
East Grinstead (seat 2/2)	Daniel Giles	
East Looe (seat 1/2)	Sir Edward Buller	
East Looe (seat 2/2)	John Buller	
East Retford (seat 1/2)	Charles Craufurd	
East Retford (seat 2/2)	Thomas Hughan	
Edinburgh (seat 1/1)	Sir Patrick Murray	
Edinburghshire (seat 1/1)	Robert Saunders Dundas	
Elgin Burghs (seat 1/1)	George Skene	
Elginshire (seat 1/1)	James Brodie	
Ennis	Rt Hon. James Fitzgerald	Tory
Enniskillen	Nathaniel Sneyd – Sat for Co. Cavan; Replaced by Richard Henry Alexander Bennet 1807	Tory; Tory
Essex (seat 1/2)	Colonel John Bullock	
Essex (seat 2/2)	Eliab Harvey	
Evesham (seat 1/2)	William Manning	
Evesham (seat 2/2)	Humphrey Howorth	
Exeter (seat 1/2)	Sir Charles Warwick Bampfylde	
Exeter (seat 2/2)	James Buller	
Eye (seat 1/2)	Marquess of Huntly – Ennobled; Replaced by Henry Wellesley 1807	
Eye (seat 2/2)	Hon. William Cornwallis; Replaced by James Cornwallis 1807	
== F ==
County Fermanagh (seat 1/2)	Mervyn Archdall	Tory
County Fermanagh (seat 2/2)	Hon. Galbraith Lowry Cole	Tory
Fife (seat 1/1)	Robert Ferguson	
Flint Boroughs (seat 1/1)	Sir Edward Pryce Lloyd, Bt	
Flintshire (seat 1/1)	Sir Thomas Mostyn	
Forfarshire (seat 1/1)	William Maule	
Fowey (seat 1/2)	Reginald Pole Carew	Tory
Fowey (seat 2/2)	Robert Wigram (junior)	Tory
== G ==
Galway	James Daly	Tory
County Galway (seat 1/2)	Richard Martin	Tory
County Galway (seat 2/2)	Denis Bowes Daly	Tory
Gatton (seat 1/2)	Sir Mark Wood, Bt	
Gatton (seat 2/2)	James Athol Wood	
Glamorganshire (seat 1/1)	Thomas Wyndham	
Glasgow Burghs (seat 1/1)	Archibald Campbell	
Gloucester (seat 1/2)	Henry Thomas Howard	Whig
Gloucester (seat 2/2)	Robert Morris	Whig
Gloucestershire (seat 1/2)	Lord Edward Somerset	Tory
Gloucestershire (seat 2/2)	Hon. George Cranfield Berkeley	Tory
Grampound (seat 1/2)	Sir Christopher Hawkins, Bt	Whig
Grampound (seat 2/2)	Henry Fawcett	
Grantham (seat 1/2)	Thomas Thoroton	
Grantham (seat 2/2)	Russell Manners	
Great Bedwyn (seat 1/2)	Viscount Stopford; Replaced by Sir Vicary Gibbs 1807	Tory
Great Bedwyn (seat 2/2)	James Henry Leigh	Tory
Great Grimsby (seat 1/2)	Hon. Charles Anderson-Pelham	
Great Grimsby (seat 2/2)	Hon. George Anderson-Pelham	
Great Marlow (seat 1/2)	Pascoe Grenfell	Whig
Great Marlow (seat 2/2)	Owen Williams	Whig
Great Yarmouth (seat 1/2)	Hon. Edward Harbord	Whig
Great Yarmouth (seat 2/2)	Dr Stephen Lushington	Whig
Guildford (seat 1/2)	Thomas Cranley Onslow	Tory
Guildford (seat 2/2)	George Holme Sumner – unseated on petition Replaced by Chapple Norton 1807	Tory; Whig
== H ==
Haddington Burghs (seat 1/1)	William Lamb, 2nd Viscount Melbourne	Whig
Haddingtonshire (seat 1/1)	Charles Hope	
Hampshire (seat 1/2)	Thomas Thistlethwayte	
Hampshire (seat 2/2)	Hon. William Herbert	
Harwich (seat 1/2)	William Henry Fremantle – Sat for Saltash; Replaced by James Adams 1807	
Harwich (seat 2/2)	John Hiley Addington	
Haslemere (seat 1/2)	Viscount Garlies – Ennobled; Replaced by Robert Plumer Ward 1807	Tory; Tory
Haslemere (seat 2/2)	Charles Long	Tory
Hastings (seat 1/2)	Sir John Nicholl	
Hastings (seat 2/2)	Sir William Fowle Middleton	
Haverfordwest (seat 1/1)	The 2nd Baron Kensington	
Hedon (seat 1/2)	George Johnstone	
Hedon (seat 2/2)	Anthony Browne	
Helston (seat 1/2)	Nicholas Vansittart – Sat for Old Sarum; Replaced by Thomas Brand 1807	Tory; Whig
Helston (seat 2/2)	John Du Ponthieu	
Hereford (seat 1/2)	Thomas Powell Symonds	
Hereford (seat 2/2)	Richard Philip Scudamore	
Herefordshire (seat 1/2)	Sir George Cornewall, Bt	Tory
Herefordshire (seat 2/2)	Sir John Cotterell, Bt	Tory
Hertford (seat 1/2)	Edward Spencer Cowper	Whig
Hertford (seat 2/2)	Nicolson Calvert	Whig
Hertfordshire (seat 1/2)	William Plumer	
Hertfordshire (seat 2/2)	William Baker	
Heytesbury (seat 1/2)	Charles Abbot – Sat for Oxford University; Replaced by Dr Charles Moore 1807	
Heytesbury (seat 2/2)	Sir William Pierce Ashe A'Court – Resigned; Replaced by Michael Symes 1807	
Higham Ferrers (seat 1/1)	Francis Ferrand Foljambe	Whig
Hindon (seat 1/2)	William Beckford	Whig
Hindon (seat 2/2)	Benjamin Hobhouse	Whig
Honiton (seat 1/2)	Thomas Cochrane	
Honiton (seat 2/2)	Augustus Cavendish-Bradshaw	
Horsham (seat 1/2)	Francis John Wilder	
Horsham (seat 2/2)	Love Jones-Parry	
Huntingdon (seat 1/2)	William Henry Fellowes	
Huntingdon (seat 2/2)	John Calvert	
Huntingdonshire (seat 1/2)	Viscount Hinchingbrooke	
Huntingdonshire (seat 2/2)	Lord Proby	
Hythe (seat 1/2)	Viscount Marsham	
Hythe (seat 2/2)	Thomas Godfrey	
== I ==
Ilchester (seat 1/2)	Sir William Manners, Bt	
Ilchester (seat 2/2)	Nathaniel Saxon	
Inverness Burghs (seat 1/1)	Francis William Grant	
Inverness-shire (seat 1/1)	Charles Grant (senior)	Pittite/Tory
Ipswich (seat 1/2)	Richard Wilson	
Ipswich (seat 2/2)	Robert Stopford	
== K ==
Kent (seat 1/2)	Sir Edward Knatchbull, Bt	Tory
Kent (seat 2/2)	William Honeywood	Whig
County Kerry (seat 1/2)	Henry Arthur Herbert	Whig
County Kerry (seat 2/2)	Rt Hon. Maurice Fitzgerald	Whig
County Kildare (seat 1/2)	Lord Robert Stephen Fitzgerald	Whig
County Kildare (seat 2/2)	Robert La Touche	Whig
Kilkenny (seat 1/1)	Hon. Charles Harward Butler	Whig
County Kilkenny (seat 1/2)	Hon. James Butler	Whig
County Kilkenny (seat 2/2)	Hon. Frederick Ponsonby	Whig
Kincardineshire (seat 1/1)	William Adam	
King's County (seat 1/2)	Sir Lawrence Parsons, Bt	Tory
King's County (seat 2/2)	Thomas Bernard (senior)	Tory
King's Lynn (seat 1/2)	Hon. Horatio Walpole	
King's Lynn (seat 2/2)	Sir Martin ffolkes, Bt	
Kingston upon Hull (seat 1/2)	William Joseph Denison	Whig
Kingston upon Hull (seat 2/2)	John Staniforth	Tory
Kinross-shire (seat 0/0)	Alternated with Clackmannanshire. Unrepresented in this Parliament.	
Kinsale (seat 1/1)	Henry Martin	Whig
Kirkcudbright Stewartry (seat 1/1)	Montgomery Granville John Stewart	Tory
Knaresborough (seat 1/2)	Viscount Ossulston	Whig
Knaresborough (seat 2/2)	Lord John Townshend	Whig
== L ==
Lanarkshire (seat 1/1)	Lord Archibald Hamilton	Whig
Lancashire (seat 1/2)	Thomas Stanley	
Lancashire (seat 2/2)	John Blackburne	
Lancaster (seat 1/2)	John Fenton-Cawthorne	Tory
Lancaster (seat 2/2)	John Dent	
Launceston (seat 1/2)	Earl Percy	Tory
Launceston (seat 2/2)	James Brogden	Tory
Leicester (seat 1/2)	Thomas Babington	
Leicester (seat 2/2)	Samuel Smith	
Leicestershire (seat 1/2)	Lord Robert William Manners	
Leicestershire (seat 2/2)	George Anthony Legh Keck	
County Leitrim (seat 1/2)	Henry John Clements	Tory
County Leitrim (seat 2/2)	William Gore	Tory
Leominster (seat 1/2)	John Lubbock	
Leominster (seat 2/2)	Henry Bonham	
Lewes (seat 1/2)	Henry Shelley	
Lewes (seat 2/2)	Thomas Kemp	
Lichfield (seat 1/2)	George Granville Venables Vernon	Whig
Lichfield (seat 2/2)	Sir George Anson	Whig
Limerick	Charles Vereker	Tory
County Limerick (seat 1/2)	William Odell	
County Limerick (seat 2/2)	Hon. William Henry Quin	
Lincoln (seat 1/2)	William Monson	
Lincoln (seat 2/2)	Richard Ellison	
Lincolnshire (seat 1/2)	Sir Gilbert Heathcote, Bt	
Lincolnshire (seat 2/2)	Charles Chaplin	
Linlithgow Burghs (seat 1/1)	Sir Charles Lockhart-Ross, Bt	
Linlithgowshire (seat 1/1)	Sir Alexander Hope	
Lisburn	Earl of Yarmouth	Tory
Liskeard (seat 1/2)	William Eliot	Tory
Liskeard (seat 2/2)	William Huskisson	Tory
Liverpool (seat 1/2)	Isaac Gascoyne	Tory
Liverpool (seat 2/2)	William Roscoe	Whig
London (City of) (seat 1/4)	William Curtis	Tory
London (City of) (seat 2/4)	Sir James Shaw, Bt	Tory
London (City of) (seat 3/4)	Sir Charles Price	Tory
London (City of) (seat 4/4)	Harvey Christian Combe	Whig
Londonderry	Sir George Fitzgerald Hill, Bt	Tory
County Londonderry (seat 1/2)	Hon. Charles William Stewart	Tory
County Londonderry (seat 2/2)	Lord George Thomas Beresford	Tory
County Longford (seat 1/2)	Sir Thomas Fetherston, Bt	Tory
County Longford (seat 2/2)	Viscount Forbes	Tory
Lostwithiel (seat 1/2)	The Viscount Lismore	
Lostwithiel (seat 2/2)	William Dickinson – Sat for Somerset; Replaced by Charles Cockerell 1807	
County Louth (seat 1/2)	John Foster	Tory
County Louth (seat 2/2)	Viscount Jocelyn	Tory
Ludgershall (seat 1/2)	Magens Dorrien-Magens	Tory
Ludgershall (seat 2/2)	Thomas Everett	Tory
Ludlow (seat 1/2)	Viscount Clive	Tory
Ludlow (seat 2/2)	Robert Clive	
Lyme Regis (seat 1/2)	Henry Fane	Tory
Lyme Regis (seat 2/2)	Lord Burghersh	Tory
Lymington (seat 1/2)	Sir Harry Burrard-Neale, Bt	
Lymington (seat 2/2)	John Kingston	
== M ==
Maidstone (seat 1/2)	George Simson	
Maidstone (seat 2/2)	George Longman	
Maldon (seat 1/2)	Joseph Holden Strutt	
Maldon (seat 2/2)	Benjamin Gaskell	
Mallow	Denham Jephson	Whig
Malmesbury (seat 1/2)	Robert Ladbroke	
Malmesbury (seat 2/2)	Nicholas Ridley-Colborne	
Malton (seat 1/2)	Viscount Milton	
Malton (seat 2/2)	Bryan Cooke	
Marlborough (seat 1/2)	Lord Bruce	
Marlborough (seat 2/2)	Earl of Dalkeith – Ennobled; Replaced by Viscount Stopford 1807	
County Mayo (seat 1/2)	Rt Hon. Denis Browne	Tory
County Mayo (seat 2/2)	Hon. Henry Augustus Dillon	Whig
County Meath (seat 1/2)	Thomas Bligh	Whig
County Meath (seat 2/2)	Sir Marcus Somerville, Bt	Whig
Merionethshire (seat 1/1)	Sir Robert Williames Vaughan	
Middlesex (seat 1/2)	George Byng	Whig
Middlesex (seat 2/2)	William Mellish	Tory
Midhurst (seat 1/2)	John Smith – Sat for Nottingham; Replaced by Henry Watkin Williams-Wynn 1807	Tory
Midhurst (seat 2/2)	William Wickham – Sat for Callington; Replaced by William Conyngham Plunket 1807	Tory
Milborne Port (seat 1/2)	Lord Paget	
Milborne Port (seat 2/2)	Hugh Leycester	
Minehead (seat 1/2)	The Lord Rancliffe	Whig
Minehead (seat 2/2)	Sir John Lethbridge, 1st Baronet – Resigned; Replaced by John Fownes Luttrell 1807	Tory; Tory
Mitchell (seat 1/2)	Sir Christopher Hawkins – Sat for Grampound; Replaced by Hon. Sir Arthur Wellesley 1807	Tory; Tory
Mitchell (seat 2/2)	Frederick Trench – Resigned; Replaced by Henry Conyngham Montgomery 1807	Tory
County Monaghan (seat 1/2)	Richard Dawson	
County Monaghan (seat 2/2)	Charles Powell Leslie II	
Monmouth Boroughs (seat 1/1)	Lord Charles Somerset	
Monmouthshire (seat 1/2)	Lt Col. Sir Charles Morgan	
Monmouthshire (seat 2/2)	Capt Lord Arthur John Henry Somerset	
Montgomery (seat 1/1)	Whitshed Keene	
Montgomeryshire (seat 1/1)	Charles Williams-Wynn	Tory
Morpeth (seat 1/2)	William Ord	Whig
Morpeth (seat 2/2)	Hon. William Howard	
== N ==
Nairnshire (seat 0/0)	Henry Frederick Campbell	
New Romney (seat 1/2)	William Windham	Whig
New Romney (seat 2/2)	Sir John Perring, Bt	Whig
New Ross	Charles Leigh	
New Shoreham (seat 1/2)	Sir Charles Merrik Burrell, Bt	Tory
New Shoreham (seat 2/2)	Timothy Shelley	
Newark (seat 1/2)	Henry Willoughby	Tory
Newark (seat 2/2)	Sir Stapleton Cotton, Bt	
Newcastle-under-Lyme (seat 1/2)	James Macdonald	
Newcastle-under-Lyme (seat 2/2)	Edward Bootle-Wilbraham	
Newcastle-upon-Tyne (seat 1/2)	Charles John Brandling	
Newcastle-upon-Tyne (seat 2/2)	Sir Matthew White Ridley, 2nd Baronet	
Newport (Cornwall) (seat 1/2)	William Northey	Tory
Newport (Cornwall) (seat 2/2)	Edward Morris	Whig
Newport (Isle of Wight) (seat 1/2)	Isaac Corry	
Newport (Isle of Wight) (seat 2/2)	Major General Sir John Doyle	
Newry	Hon. Francis Needham	Tory
Newton (Lancashire) (seat 1/2)	Colonel Peter Heron	
Newton (Lancashire) (seat 2/2)	Thomas Brooke	
Newtown (Isle of Wight) (seat 1/2)	Sir Robert Barclay	Whig
Newtown (Isle of Wight) (seat 2/2)	George Canning	Tory
Norfolk (seat 1/2)	Thomas Coke – Election void Replaced by Sir Jacob Astley, Bt 1807	Whig; Whig
Norfolk (seat 2/2)	William Windham – Sat for New Romney; Replaced by Edward Coke 1807	Whig; Whig
Northallerton (seat 1/2)	Hon. Edward Lascelles	Tory
Northallerton (seat 2/2)	Henry Peirse (younger)	Whig
Northampton (seat 1/2)	Hon. Spencer Perceval	
Northampton (seat 2/2)	Hon. Edward Bouverie	
Northamptonshire (seat 1/2)	Viscount Althorp	
Northamptonshire (seat 2/2)	William Ralph Cartwright	
Northumberland (seat 1/2)	Charles Grey	
Northumberland (seat 2/2)	Thomas Richard Beaumont	
Norwich (seat 1/2)	Robert Fellowes	
Norwich (seat 2/2)	John Patteson	Tory
Nottingham (seat 1/2)	Daniel Parker Coke	
Nottingham (seat 2/2)	John Smith	Tory
Nottinghamshire (seat 1/2)	Anthony Hardolph Eyre	
Nottinghamshire (seat 2/2)	Charles Pierrepoint	
== O ==
Okehampton (seat 1/2)	Richard Bateman-Robson	Whig
Okehampton (seat 2/2)	Joseph Foster-Barham	Whig
Old Sarum (seat 1/2)	Nicholas Vansittart	Tory
Old Sarum (seat 2/2)	The Lord Blayney	
Orford (seat 1/2)	Lord Robert Seymour	Tory
Orford (seat 2/2)	Lord Henry Moore	Tory
Orkney and Shetland (seat 1/1)	Robert Honyman	
Oxford (seat 1/2)	Francis Burton	
Oxford (seat 2/2)	John Atkyns-Wright	
Oxfordshire (seat 1/2)	Lord Francis Spencer	
Oxfordshire (seat 2/2)	John Fane	
Oxford University (seat 1/2)	Sir William Scott	Tory
Oxford University (seat 2/2)	Charles Abbot	Tory
== P ==
Peeblesshire (seat 1/1)	James Montgomery	
Pembroke Boroughs (seat 1/1)	Hugh Barlow	Whig
Pembrokeshire (seat 1/1)	Lord Milford	
Penryn (seat 1/2)	Henry Swann	Tory
Penryn (seat 2/2)	Sir Christopher Hawkins; Replaced by John Bettesworth-Trevanion 1807	Tory; Tory
Perth Burghs (seat 1/1)	Sir David Wedderburn, Bt	Tory
Perthshire (seat 1/1)	Thomas Graham	
Peterborough (seat 1/2)	French Laurence	Whig
Peterborough (seat 2/2)	William Elliot	Whig
Petersfield (seat 1/2)	Hylton Jolliffe	
Petersfield (seat 2/2)	Hon. John Ward	
Plymouth (seat 1/2)	Thomas Tyrwhitt	
Plymouth (seat 2/2)	Admiral Sir Charles Pole	
Plympton Erle (seat 1/2)	Viscount Castlereagh	
Plympton Erle (seat 2/2)	Sir Stephen Lushington – Died; Replaced by William Assheton Harbord 1807	
Pontefract (seat 1/2)	Robert Pemberton Milnes	
Pontefract (seat 2/2)	John Smyth	
Poole (seat 1/2)	George Garland	
Poole (seat 2/2)	John Jeffery	
Portarlington	Sir Oswald Mosley, Bt	
Portsmouth (seat 1/2)	John Markham	Whig
Portsmouth (seat 2/2)	Sir Thomas Miller, Bt	Whig
Preston (seat 1/2)	Lord Stanley	Whig
Preston (seat 2/2)	Samuel Horrocks	Tory
== Q ==
Queenborough (seat 1/2)	William Frankland	Whig
Queenborough (seat 2/2)	Sir Samuel Romilly	Whig
Queen's County (seat 1/2)	Hon. William Wellesley-Pole	Tory
Queen's County (seat 2/2)	Henry Brooke Parnell	Whig
== R ==
Radnor Boroughs (seat 1/1)	Richard Price	
Radnorshire (seat 1/1)	Walter Wilkins	
Reading (seat 1/2)	Charles Shaw-Lefevre	
Reading (seat 2/2)	John Simeon	
Reigate (seat 1/2)	Edward Charles Cocks	
Reigate (seat 2/2)	Viscount Royston	
Renfrewshire (seat 1/1)	Boyd Alexander	
Richmond (Yorkshire) (seat 1/2)	Arthur Shakespeare	Whig
Richmond (Yorkshire) (seat 2/2)	Charles Lawrence Dundas	Whig
Ripon (seat 1/2)	Sir James Graham, Bt	Tory
Ripon (seat 2/2)	The Lord Headley	Tory
Rochester (seat 1/2)	John Calcraft	Whig
Rochester (seat 2/2)	James Barnett	
County Roscommon (seat 1/2)	Arthur French	Whig
County Roscommon (seat 2/2)	Hon. Stephen Mahon	Whig
Ross-shire (seat 1/1)	Alexander Mackenzie-Fraser	
Roxburghshire (seat 1/1)	John Rutherford	
Rutland (seat 1/2)	Gerard Noel Edwardes	Whig
Rutland (seat 2/2)	The Lord Henniker	
Rye (seat 1/2)	Patrick Craufurd Bruce	
Rye (seat 2/2)	Michael Angelo Taylor	
== S ==
St Albans (seat 1/2)	William Stephen Poyntz	
St Albans (seat 2/2)	Hon. James Grimston	Tory
St Germans (seat 1/2)	Sir Joseph Yorke	Tory
St Germans (seat 2/2)	Matthew Montagu	Tory
St Ives (seat 1/2)	Samuel Stephens	
St Ives (seat 2/2)	Francis Horner	Whig
St Mawes (seat 1/2)	Sir John Newport – Sat for Waterford; Replaced by William Shipley 1807	Whig
St Mawes (seat 2/2)	Scrope Bernard	Tory
Salisbury (seat 1/2)	Viscount Folkestone	
Salisbury (seat 2/2)	William Hussey	
Saltash (seat 1/2)	Matthew Russell; Replaced by Hon. Richard Griffin 1807	Whig
Saltash (seat 2/2)	Arthur Champernowne; Replaced by William Henry Fremantle 1807	
Sandwich (seat 1/2)	Captain Thomas Fremantle	
Sandwich (seat 2/2)	Sir Horatio Mann, Bt	
Scarborough (seat 1/2)	Charles Manners Sutton	Tory
Scarborough (seat 2/2)	Hon. Edmund Phipps	Tory
Seaford (seat 1/2)	George Hibbert	Tory
Seaford (seat 2/2)	John Leach	Tory
Selkirkshire (seat 1/1)	William Eliott-Lockhart	
Shaftesbury (seat 1/2)	Edward Loveden Loveden	Whig
Shaftesbury (seat 2/2)	Captain Sir Home Riggs Popham	
Shrewsbury (seat 1/2)	Henry Grey Bennet	Whig
Shrewsbury (seat 2/2)	Hon. William Hill	Tory
Shropshire (seat 1/2)	John Kynaston	
Shropshire (seat 2/2)	John Cotes	
Sligo	George Canning	Tory
County Sligo (seat 1/2)	Edward Synge Cooper	Tory
County Sligo (seat 2/2)	Charles O'Hara	Whig
Somerset (seat 1/2)	Thomas Lethbridge	Tory
Somerset (seat 2/2)	William Dickinson	Tory
Southampton (seat 1/2)	George Henry Rose	
Southampton (seat 2/2)	Arthur Atherley	
Southwark (seat 1/2)	Henry Thornton	Independent
Southwark (seat 2/2)	Sir Thomas Turton, Bt	
Stafford (seat 1/2)	Edward Monckton	Tory
Stafford (seat 2/2)	Richard Mansel-Philipps	Tory
Staffordshire (seat 1/2)	Sir Edward Littleton, Bt	Whig
Staffordshire (seat 2/2)	Earl Gower	Whig
Stamford (seat 1/2)	Albemarle Bertie	Tory
Stamford (seat 2/2)	John Leland	Tory
Steyning (seat 1/2)	James Lloyd	Whig
Steyning (seat 2/2)	Robert Hurst	Whig
Stirling Burghs (seat 1/1)	Sir John Henderson, Bt	
Stirlingshire (seat 1/1)	Charles Elphinstone Fleeming	
Stockbridge (seat 1/2)	John Foster Barham – Sat for Okehampton; Replaced by Sir John Fleming Leicester 1807	Whig; Whig
Stockbridge (seat 2/2)	George Porter	Whig
Sudbury (seat 1/2)	Sir John Coxe Hippisley	
Sudbury (seat 2/2)	John Pytches	
Suffolk (seat 1/2)	Sir Charles Bunbury, Bt	
Suffolk (seat 2/2)	Thomas Gooch	
Surrey (seat 1/2)	Lord William Russell	Whig
Surrey (seat 2/2)	Sir John Frederick, Bt	Tory
Sussex (seat 1/2)	John Fuller	
Sussex (seat 2/2)	Charles Lennox – Ennobled; Replaced by Charles William Wyndham 1807	
Sutherland (seat 1/1)	William Dundas	Tory
== T ==
Tain Burghs (seat 1/1)	John Randoll Mackenzie	
Tamworth (seat 1/2)	William Loftus	
Tamworth (seat 2/2)	Sir Robert Peel	Tory
Taunton (seat 1/2)	Alexander Baring	
Taunton (seat 2/2)	John Hammet	
Tavistock (seat 1/2)	Lord Robert Spencer	Whig
Tavistock (seat 2/2)	Hon. Richard FitzPatrick	Whig
Tewkesbury (seat 1/2)	James Martin	Whig
Tewkesbury (seat 2/2)	Christopher Bethell Codrington	Tory
Thetford (seat 1/2)	Lord William FitzRoy	
Thetford (seat 2/2)	James Mingay; Replaced by Thomas Creevey 1807	
Thirsk (seat 1/2)	James Topping	
Thirsk (seat 2/2)	Robert Greenhill-Russell	Whig
County Tipperary (seat 1/2)	Hon. Montagu James Mathew	Whig
County Tipperary (seat 2/2)	Hon. Francis Aldborough Prittie	Whig
Tiverton (seat 1/2)	William Fitzhugh	Tory
Tiverton (seat 2/2)	Hon. Richard Ryder	Tory
Totnes (seat 1/2)	Benjamin Hall	
Totnes (seat 2/2)	William Adams	
Tralee	Rt Hon. Maurice FitzGerald – Sat for Co. Kerry; Replaced by Samuel Boddington 1807	Whig; Tory
Tregony (seat 1/2)	Godfrey Wentworth Wentworth	Whig
Tregony (seat 2/2)	James O'Callaghan	Whig
Truro (seat 1/2)	Edward Leveson-Gower	Tory
Truro (seat 2/2)	John Lemon	Whig
County Tyrone (seat 1/2)	Hon. Thomas Knox	
County Tyrone (seat 2/2)	James Stewart	
== W ==
Wallingford (seat 1/2)	William Hughes	Whig
Wallingford (seat 2/2)	Richard Benyon	Tory
Wareham (seat 1/2)	Jonathan Raine	
Wareham (seat 2/2)	Andrew Strahan	
Warwick (seat 1/2)	Charles Mills	
Warwick (seat 2/2)	Lord Brooke	Tory
Warwickshire (seat 1/2)	Dugdale Stratford Dugdale	
Warwickshire (seat 2/2)	Charles Mordaunt	
Waterford	Sir John Newport, Bt	Tory
County Waterford (seat 1/2)	John Claudius Beresford	Tory
County Waterford (seat 2/2)	Richard Power	Whig
Wells (seat 1/2)	Charles William Taylor	Whig
Wells (seat 2/2)	Clement Tudway	
Wendover (seat 1/2)	Viscount Mahon – Sat for Hull; Replaced by Francis Horner 1807	Whig; Whig
Wendover (seat 2/2)	George Smith	Whig
Wenlock (seat 1/2)	John Simpson	
Wenlock (seat 2/2)	Cecil Forester	
Weobley (seat 1/2)	Lord George Thynne	
Weobley (seat 2/2)	Robert Steele	
West Looe (seat 1/2)	Ralph Allen Daniell	
West Looe (seat 2/2)	James Buller	
Westbury (seat 1/2)	William Jacob	
Westbury (seat 2/2)	John Woolmore	
County Westmeath (seat 1/2)	William Smyth	
County Westmeath	Gustavus Hume-Rochfort	
Westminster (seat 1/2)	Sir Samuel Hood	Tory
Westminster (seat 2/2)	Richard Brinsley Sheridan	Whig
Westmorland (seat 1/2)	James Lowther	Tory
Westmorland (seat 2/2)	The Lord Muncaster	Tory
Wexford	Sir Robert Wigram, Bt	Tory
County Wexford (seat 1/2)	John Colclough	Whig
County Wexford (seat 2/2)	Robert Shapland Carew	Whig
Weymouth and Melcombe Regis (seat 1/4)	Sir James Murray-Pulteney	Tory
Weymouth and Melcombe Regis (seat 2/4)	Richard Augustus Tucker Steward	
Weymouth and Melcombe Regis (seat 3/4)	Charles Adams	Tory
Weymouth and Melcombe Regis (seat 4/4)	Gabriel Tucker Steward	Tory
Whitchurch (seat 1/2)	William Brodrick	
Whitchurch (seat 2/2)	Hon. William Augustus Townshend	
County Wicklow (seat 1/2)	William Hoare Hume	Whig
County Wicklow (seat 2/2)	William Tighe	Whig
Wigan (seat 1/2)	John Hodson	Tory
Wigan (seat 2/2)	Sir Robert Holt Leigh	Tory
Wigtown Burghs (seat 1/1)	Edward Richard Stewart	
Wigtownshire (seat 1/1)	William Maxwell	
Wilton (seat 1/2)	Ralph Sheldon	
Wilton (seat 2/2)	Captain the Hon. Charles Herbert	
Wiltshire (seat 1/2)	Henry Penruddocke Wyndham	Whig
Wiltshire (seat 2/2)	Richard Godolphin Long	Tory
Winchelsea (seat 1/2)	Sir Frederick Fletcher-Vane	Whig
Winchelsea (seat 2/2)	Calverley Bewicke	Whig
Winchester (seat 1/2)	Sir Henry St John-Mildmay, Bt	
Winchester (seat 2/2)	Richard Grace Gamon	
Windsor (seat 1/2)	Edward Disbrowe	Tory
Windsor (seat 2/2)	Richard Ramsbottom	Tory
Woodstock (seat 1/2)	Sir Henry Dashwood, Bt	
Woodstock (seat 2/2)	Hon. William Eden	
Wootton Bassett (seat 1/2)	Robert Knight	Whig
Wootton Bassett (seat 2/2)	Robert Williams	
Worcester (seat 1/2)	Henry Bromley – Resigned; Replaced by William Gordon 1807	Whig
Worcester (seat 2/2)	Abraham Robarts	Whig
Worcestershire (seat 1/2)	William Lyttelton	
Worcestershire (seat 2/2)	William Lygon	
Wycombe (seat 1/2)	Sir Thomas Baring, Bt	
Wycombe (seat 2/2)	Sir John Dashwood-King, Bt	Tory
== Y ==
Yarmouth (Isle of Wight) (seat 1/2)	Jervoise Clarke Jervoise	Whig
Yarmouth (Isle of Wight) (seat 2/2)	Thomas William Plummer	
York (seat 1/2)	Sir William Mordaunt Milner, Bt.	Whig
York (seat 2/2)	Lawrence Dundas	Whig
Yorkshire (seat 1/2)	Walter Fawkes	Tory
Yorkshire (seat 2/2)	William Wilberforce	Tory
Youghal (seat 1/1)	Viscount Bernard	Tory

== By-elections ==
- List of United Kingdom by-elections (1801–06)

== See also ==
- List of parliaments of the United Kingdom
- Members of the 3rd UK Parliament from Ireland
- Unreformed House of Commons
