= List of MPs elected in the 1802 United Kingdom general election =

1802–1806 Parliament of the United Kingdom
←	1801–1802 Parliament	1806–1807 Parliament	→
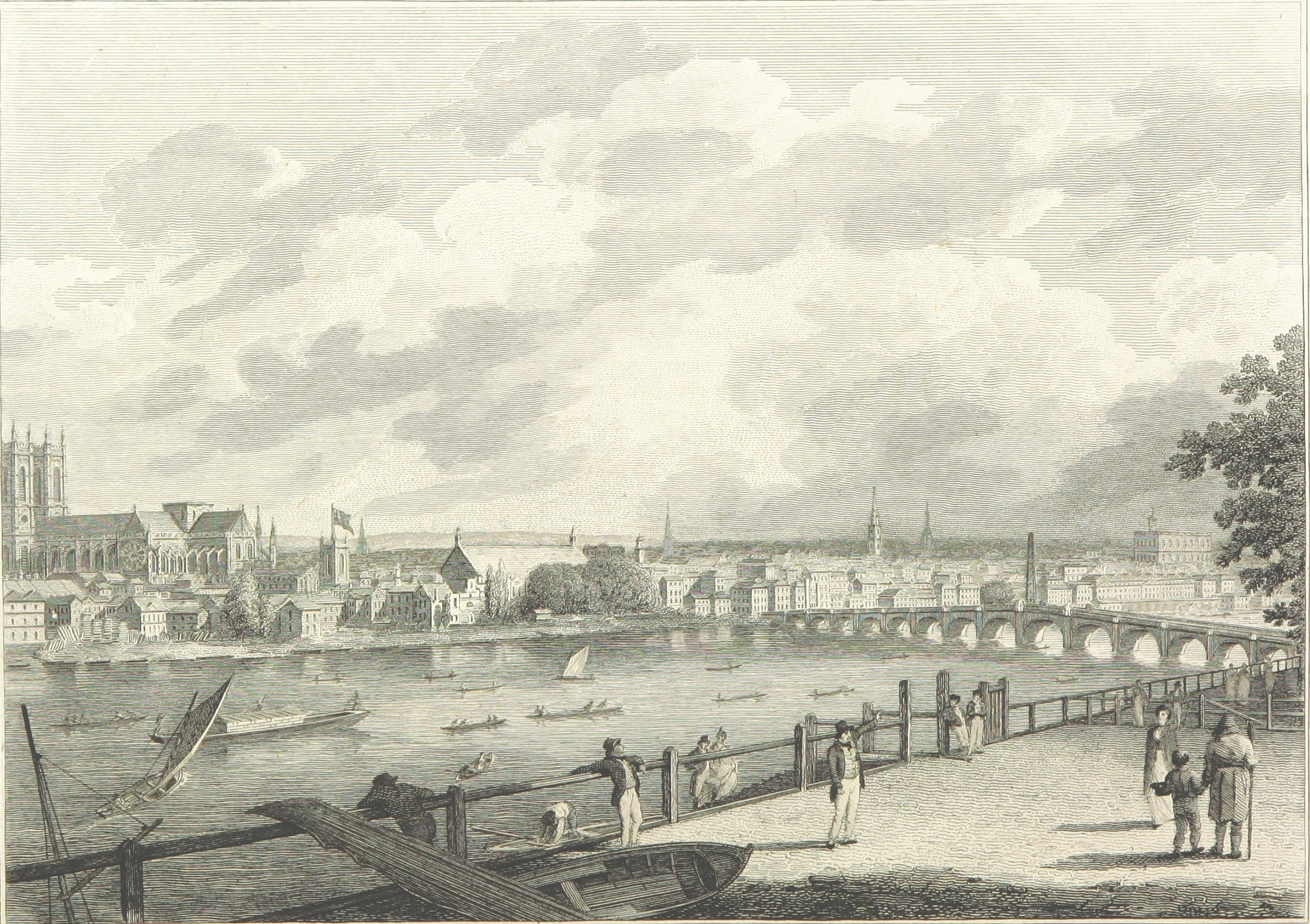
- The Palace of Westminster in 1804

Overview
- Legislative body: Parliament of the United Kingdom
- Jurisdiction: United Kingdom
- Meeting place: Palace of Westminster
- Term: 31 August 1802 – 24 October 1806
- Election: 1802 United Kingdom general election
- Government: Addington ministry (until 1804); Second Pitt ministry

House of Commons
- Members: 658
- Speaker: Charles Abbot
- Leader: Henry Addington (until 1804); William Pitt the Younger
- Prime Minister: Henry Addington (until 1804); William Pitt the Younger
- Leader of the Opposition: Charles James Fox

House of Lords
- Lord Chancellor: John Scott, 1st Earl of Eldon
- Leader: Thomas Pelham, 2nd Earl of Chichester (until 1803); Robert Jenkinson, 2nd Earl of Liverpool
- Leader of the Opposition: William Grenville, 1st Baron Grenville

Crown-in-Parliament King George III

Sessions
- 1st: 16 November 1802 – 12 August 1803
- 2nd: 22 November 1803 – 31 July 1804
- 3rd: 15 January 1805 – 12 July 1805
- 4th: 21 January 1806 – 23 July 1806

This is a list of MPs elected in the 1802 United Kingdom general election and their replacements returned at subsequent by-elections, arranged by constituency. The second United Kingdom Parliament was summoned to meet on 31 August 1802 and was dissolved on 24 October 1806. This Parliament was the first elected by a UK-wide election following the 1801 Union between Great Britain and Ireland and the creation of the first Parliament of the United Kingdom, whose members were co-opted from the previous House of Commons of Great Britain and Irish House of Commons.

Table of contents:

A B C D E F G H I J K L M N O P Q R S T U V W X Y Z By-elections Changes

== A ==
Aberdeen Burghs (seat 1/1)	James Farquhar	
Aberdeenshire (seat 1/1)	James Ferguson	Tory
Abingdon (seat 1/1)	Thomas Metcalfe	Tory
Aldborough (seat 1/2)	John Sullivan	
Aldborough (seat 2/2)	Charles Duncombe	
Aldeburgh (seat 1/2)	Sir John Aubrey, Bt.	Whig
Aldeburgh (seat 2/2)	John McMahon	Tory
Amersham (seat 1/2)	Thomas Drake Tyrwhitt-Drake	Tory
Amersham (seat 2/2)	Charles Drake Garrard – resigned Replaced by Thomas Tyrwhitt-Drake 1805	Tory; Tory
Andover (seat 1/2)	Thomas Assheton Smith I	Tory
Andover (seat 2/2)	Hon. Newton Fellowes	Whig
Anglesey (seat 1/1)	Sir Arthur Paget	Whig
Anstruther Easter Burghs (seat 1/1)	Alexander Campbell	
County Antrim(seat 1/2)	John Bruce Richard O'Neill	Tory
County Antrim (seat 2/2)	Edmond Alexander MacNaghten	Tory
Appleby (seat 1/2)	Sir Philip Francis	Whig
Appleby (seat 2/2)	John Courtenay	
Armagh	Patrick Duigenan	Tory
County Armagh (seat 1/2)	Hon. Archibald Acheson	Tory
County Armagh (seat 2/2)	Henry Caulfeild	Whig
Argyllshire (seat 1/1)	Lord John Campbell	
Arundel (seat 1/2)	Viscount Andover	
Arundel (seat 2/2)	John Atkins	
Ashburton (seat 1/2)	Walter Palk	
Ashburton (seat 2/2)	Sir Hugh Inglis	
Athlone	William Handcock – resigned Replaced by Thomas Tyrwhitt Jones 1803	
Aylesbury (seat 1/2)	James Du Pre	
Aylesbury (seat 2/2)	Robert Bent – election void Replaced by William Cavendish 1804	
Ayr Burghs (seat 1/1)	John Campbell II	
Ayrshire (seat 1/1)	William Fullarton – appointed to office Replaced by Sir Hew Dalrymple-Hamilton 1803	
== B ==
Banbury (seat 1/1)	Dudley Long North	
Bandon	Sir Broderick Chinnery, Bt	Whig
Banffshire (seat 1/1)	Sir William Grant	
Barnstaple (seat 1/2)	William Devaynes	
Barnstaple (seat 2/2)	Captain Sir Edward Pellew resigned Replaced by Viscount Ebrington 1804	
Bath (seat 1/2)	Lord John Thynne	
Bath (seat 2/2)	John Palmer	
Beaumaris (seat 1/1)	The Lord Newborough	
Bedford (seat 1/2)	William Lee-Antonie	Whig
Bedford (seat 2/2)	Samuel Whitbread	Whig
Bedfordshire (seat 1/2)	John Osborn	Tory
Bedfordshire (seat 2/2)	Hon. St Andrew St John – ennobled Replaced by Francis Pym 1806	Whig
Bedwyn	See Great Bedwyn	
Belfast	James Edward May	Tory
Bere Alston (seat 1/2)	William Mitford	
Bere Alston (seat 2/2)	Lord Lovaine	
Berkshire (seat 1/2)	George Vansittart	Tory
Berkshire (seat 2/2)	Charles Dundas	Whig
Berwickshire (seat 1/1)	George Baillie	
Berwick-upon-Tweed (seat 1/2)	Thomas Hall – unseated on petition Replaced by Francis Sitwell 1803	
Berwick-upon-Tweed (seat 2/2) 1803	John Fordyce – unseated on petition Replaced by Alexander Allan 1803	
Beverley (seat 1/2)	John Wharton	Whig
Beverley (seat 2/2)	Napier Christie Burton	
Bewdley (seat 1/1)	Miles Peter Andrews	
Bishops Castle (seat 1/2)	William Clive	
Bishops Castle (seat 2/2)	John Robinson	
Bletchingley (seat 1/2)	James Milnes – died Replaced by Nicholas Ridley-Colborne 1805	
Bletchingley (seat 2/2)	John Benn Walsh	
Bodmin (seat 1/2)	Sir John Morshead, Bt; Replaced by Josias Porcher 1802	
Bodmin (seat 2/2)	Charles Shaw-Lefevre – sat for Reading; Replaced by John Sargent 1802 – resigned Replaced by James Topping 1806	
Boroughbridge (seat 1/2)	Edward Berkeley Portman	Whig
Boroughbridge (seat 2/2)	Hon. John Scott – died Replaced by Viscount Castlereagh 1806	Tory; Tory
Bossiney (seat 1/2)	Hon. James Stuart-Wortley	Tory
Bossiney (seat 2/2)	John Hiley Addington – resigned Replaced by George Peter Holford 1803	Tory
Boston (seat 1/2)	William Alexander Madocks	
Boston (seat 2/2)	Thomas Fydell I – election void Replaced by Thomas Fydell 2	
Brackley (seat 1/2)	John William Egerton – ennobled Replaced by Anthony Henderson 1803	Tory; Tory
Brackley (seat 2/2)	Samuel Haynes – resigned Replaced by Robert Haldane Bradshaw 1802	Tory
Bramber (seat 1/2)	George Manners-Sutton – died Replaced by Richard Norman 1804	
Bramber (seat 2/2)	Henry Jodrell	
Brecon (seat 1/1)	Sir Robert Salusbury, Bt	
Breconshire (seat 1/1)	Sir Charles Morgan, Bt	
Bridgnorth (seat 1/2)	Isaac Hawkins Browne	
Bridgnorth (seat 2/2)	John Whitmore	
Bridgwater (seat 1/2)	George Pocock	
Bridgwater (seat 2/2)	Jeffreys Allen appointed to office Replaced by John Huddleston 1804	
Bridport (seat 1/2)	George Barclay	
Bridport (seat 2/2)	Sir Evan Nepean, Bt	
Bristol (seat 1/2)	Charles Bragge	
Bristol (seat 2/2)	Evan Baillie	
Buckingham (seat 1/2)	Lord Proby – died Replaced by Lord Proby 1805 – resigned Replaced by Earl Percy 1806	
Buckingham (seat 2/2)	Thomas Grenville	
Buckinghamshire (seat 1/2)	Richard Temple Nugent Grenville, Earl Temple	
Buckinghamshire (seat 2/2)	Marquess of Titchfield	Tory
Bury St Edmunds (seat 1/2)	Lord Charles FitzRoy	
Bury St Edmunds (seat 2/2)	Lord Hervey – ennobled Replaced by The Lord Templetown 1803	
Buteshire (seat 0/0)	Alternated with Caithness. No representation in this Parliament.	
== C ==
Caernarvon Boroughs (seat 1/1)	Hon. Edward Paget	
Caernarvonshire (seat 1/1)	Robert Williams	
Caithness (seat 1/1)	John Sinclair	Whig
Callington (seat 1/2)	John Inglett-Fortescue resigned Replaced by Ambrose St John 1803	
Callington (seat 2/2)	Paul Orchard	
Calne (seat 1/2)	Joseph Jekyll	
Calne (seat 2/2)	Lord Henry Petty – resigned Replaced by Osborne Markham 1806	Whig
Cambridge (seat 1/2)	Edward Finch	Tory
Cambridge (seat 2/2)	Robert Manners	Tory
Cambridgeshire (seat 1/2)	Lord Charles Manners	
Cambridgeshire (seat 2/2)	Charles Philip Yorke	Tory
Cambridge University (seat 1/2)	William Pitt the Younger – died Replaced by Lord Henry Petty	Whig
Cambridge University (seat 2/2)	Earl of Euston	Whig
Camelford (seat 1/2)	Robert Adair	Whig
Camelford (seat 2/2)	John Fonblanque	Whig
Canterbury (seat 1/2)	John Baker	Whig
Canterbury (seat 2/2)	George Watson	
Cardiff Boroughs (seat 1/1)	Lord William Stuart	Tory
Cardigan Boroughs (seat 1/1)	Hon. John Vaughan	
Cardiganshire (seat 1/1)	Thomas Johnes	
Carlisle (seat 1/2)	Walter Spencer-Stanhope	Tory
Carlisle (seat 2/2)	John Christian Curwen Bt	Whig
Carlow (seat 1/1)	Charles Montagu Ormsby – appointed to office Replaced by Michael Symes 1806	
County Carlow (seat 1/2)	David Latouche	Whig
County Carlow (seat 2/2)	Walter Bagenal	Whig
Carmarthen (seat 1/1)	John George Philipps resigned Replaced by Sir William Paxton 1803	
Carmarthenshire (seat 1/1)	James Hamlyn Williams	
Carrickfergus (seat 1/1)	Lord Spencer Chichester	
Cashel (seat 1/1)	Rt Hon. William Wickham	Whig
Castle Rising (seat 1/2)	Peter Isaac Thellusson	
Castle Rising (seat 2/2)	Charles Bagot-Chester	
County Cavan (seat 1/2)	Francis Saunderson	Whig
County Cavan (seat 2/2)	Nathaniel Sneyd	Tory
Cheshire (seat 1/2)	William Egerton – died Replaced by Davies Davenport 1806	
Cheshire (seat 2/2)	Thomas Cholmondeley	
Chester (seat 1/2)	Viscount Belgrave – ennobled Replaced by Richard Erle-Drax-Grosvenor 1802	
Chester (seat 2/2)	Thomas Grosvenor	
Chichester (seat 1/2)	George White-Thomas	
Chichester (seat 2/2)	Thomas Steele	
Chippenham (seat 1/2)	James Dawkins	
Chippenham (seat 2/2)	Charles Brooke – unseated on petition Replaced by John Maitland 1803	
Chipping Wycombe (seat 1/2)	Sir Francis Baring, Bt	
Chipping Wycombe (seat 2/2)	Sir John Dashwood-King, Bt	
Christchurch (seat 1/2)	William Sturges Bourne	Tory
Christchurch (seat 2/2)	George Rose	
Cirencester (seat 1/2)	Michael Hicks-Beach	
Cirencester (seat 2/2)	Sir Robert Preston, Bt	
Clackmannanshire (seat 0/0)	Alternated with Kinross-shire. Unrepresented in this Parliament	
County Clare (seat 1/2)	Hon. Francis Nathaniel Burton	
County Clare (seat 2/2)	Sir Edward O'Brien, 4th Baronet	Whig
Clitheroe (seat 1/2)	Hon. John Cust	Tory
Clitheroe (seat 2/2)	Hon. Robert Curzon	Tory
Clonmel (seat 1/1)	Rt Hon. William Bagwell 1801	
Cockermouth (seat 1/2)	James Graham – resigned Replaced by Viscount Garlies 1805	Tory; Tory
Cockermouth (seat 2/2)	Robert Plumer Ward	Tory
Colchester (seat 1/2)	Robert Thornton	
Colchester (seat 2/2)	John Denison	
Coleraine	Walter Jones	Tory
Corfe Castle (seat 1/2)	Nathaniel Bond	
Corfe Castle (seat 2/2)	Henry Bankes	
Cork (seat 1/2)	Hon. Christopher Hely-Hutchinson	
Cork (seat 2/2)	Mountifort Longfield	Tory
County Cork (seat 1/2)	Viscount Boyle	
County Cork (seat 2/2)	Robert Uniacke Fitzgerald	
Cornwall (seat 1/2)	Francis Gregor	Tory
Cornwall (seat 2/2)	Sir William Lemon, Bt	Whig
Coventry (seat 1/2)	Francis William Barlow – died Replaced by William Mills 1805	
Coventry (seat 2/2)	Nathaniel Jefferys – election void Replaced by Peter Moore 1803	
Cricklade (seat 1/2)	Lord Portchester	
Cricklade (seat 2/2)	Thomas Estcourt	
Cromartyshire (seat 1/1)	Alexander Mackenzie Fraser	
Cumberland (seat 1/2)	Sir Henry Fletcher, Bt	Whig
Cumberland (seat 2/2)	John Lowther	Tory
== D ==
Dartmouth (seat 1/2)	Edmund Bastard	
Dartmouth (seat 2/2)	Arthur Howe Holdsworth	
Denbigh Boroughs (seat 1/1)	Hon. Frederick West	
Denbighshire (seat 1/1)	Sir Watkin Williams-Wynn, 5th Baronet	
Derby (seat 1/2)	George Walpole	
Derby (seat 2/2)	Edward Coke	
Derbyshire (seat 1/2)	George Cavendish	Whig
Derbyshire (seat 2/2)	Edward Miller Mundy	Tory
Devizes (seat 1/2)	Joshua Smith	
Devizes (seat 2/2)	Henry Addington – ennobled Replaced by Thomas Grimston Estcourt 1805	Tory
Devon (seat 1/2)	John Pollexfen Bastard	Tory
Devon (seat 2/2)	Sir Lawrence Palk, Bt	
County Donegal (seat 1/2)	Sir James Stewart, Bt	
County Donegal (seat 2/2)	Viscount Sudley	Tory
Dorchester (seat 1/2)	Hon. Cropley Ashley-Cooper	
Dorchester (seat 2/2)	Francis Fane	
Dorset (seat 1/2)	Francis John Browne	
Dorset (seat 2/2)	William Morton Pitt	
Dover (seat 1/2)	John Spencer Smith	
Dover (seat 2/2)	John Trevanion	
County Down (seat 1/2)	Viscount Castlereagh – appointed to office Replaced by John Meade	Tory
County Down (seat 2/2)	Francis Savage	
Downpatrick (seat 1/1)	Charles Stewart Hawthorne	
Downton (seat 1/2)	Hon. Edward Bouverie resigned Replaced by The Lord de Blaquiere 1803	Tory
Downton (seat 2/2)	Hon. John William Ward resigned Replaced by Viscount Marsham 1803	Tory; Tory
Drogheda (seat 1/1)	Edward Hardman	
Droitwich (seat 1/2)	Sir Edward Winnington, Bt – died Replaced by Thomas Foley 1805	Whig; Whig
Droitwich (seat 2/2)	Andrew Foley	Whig
Dublin (seat 1/2)	John Claudius Beresford – resigned Sir Robert Shaw, Bt 1804	Tory; Tory
Dublin (seat 2/2)	John La Touche	Whig
County Dublin (seat 1/2)	Hans Hamilton	Tory
County Dublin (seat 2/2)	Frederick John Falkiner	Tory
Dublin University (seat 1/1)	Hon. George Knox	Tory
Dumfries Burghs (seat 1/1)	Charles Hope – resigned Replaced by Viscount Stopford 1803	
Dumfriesshire (seat 1/1)	Sir Robert Laurie, Bt died Replaced by Sir William Johnstone Hope 1804	
Dunbartonshire (seat 1/1)	Sir James Colquhoun, 3rd Bt – resigned Replaced by Henry Glassford 1806	
Dundalk (seat 1/1)	Richard Archdall	Tory
Dungannon (seat 1/1)	Hon. George Knox – Sat for Dublin University; Replaced by Sir Charles Hamilton, Bt 1803	
Dungarvan (seat 1/1)	William Greene	Whig
Dunwich (seat 1/2)	Snowdon Barne	
Dunwich (seat 2/2)	The Lord Huntingfield	
Durham (City of) (seat 1/2)	Richard Wharton – election void Replaced by Robert Eden Duncombe Shafto 1804	Tory
Durham (City of) (seat 2/2)	Ralph John Lambton	Whig
Durham (County) (seat 1/2)	Rowland Burdon	Tory
Durham (County) (seat 2/2)	Ralphe Milbanke	Whig
Dysart Burghs (seat 1/1)	Sir James St Clair-Erskine – ennobled Replaced by Sir Robert Dallas 1805	
== E ==
East Grinstead (seat 1/2)	Sir Henry Strachey	
East Grinstead (seat 2/2)	Daniel Giles	
East Looe (seat 1/2)	Sir Edward Buller	Tory
East Looe (seat 2/2)	John Buller	Tory
East Retford (seat 1/2)	Lt Colonel Robert Craufurd	
East Retford (seat 2/2)	John Jaffray	
Edinburgh (seat 1/1)	Henry Dundas – ennobled Replaced by Charles Hope 1803 – appointed to office Replaced by George Abercromby 1805	Tory; Tory; Whig
Edinburghshire (seat 1/1)	Robert Saunders Dundas	Tory
Elgin Burghs (seat 1/1)	Francis Ogilvy-Grant	
Elginshire (seat 1/1)	James Brodie	
Ennis	Rt Hon. James Fitzgerald	Tory
Enniskillen	Rt Hon. John Beresford – sat for Waterford; Replaced by William Burroughs 1802 – appointed judge Replaced by John King 1806 – resigned Replaced by William Henry Fremantle 1806	Tory; Tory; Tory; Tory
Essex (seat 1/2)	Colonel John Bullock	Whig
Essex (seat 2/2)	Eliab Harvey	
Evesham (seat 1/2)	Patrick Craufurd Bruce	
Evesham (seat 2/2)	Charles Thellusson	
Exeter (seat 1/2)	Sir Charles Warwick Bampfylde	Whig
Exeter (seat 2/2)	James Buller	
Eye (seat 1/2)	James Cornwallis	Tory
Eye (seat 2/2)	Hon. William Cornwallis	
== F ==
County Fermanagh (seat 1/2)	Mervyn Archdall	Tory
County Fermanagh (seat 2/2)	Viscount Cole – ennobled Replaced by Hon. Lowry Cole 1803	Tory
Fife (seat 1/1)	Sir William Erskine, Bt.	
Flint Boroughs (seat 1/1)	Watkin Williams	
Flintshire (seat 1/1)	Sir Thomas Mostyn	
Forfarshire (seat 1/1)	Sir David Carnegie, Bt. – died Replaced by William Maule 1805	
Fowey (seat 1/2)	Reginald Pole Carew	Tory
Fowey (seat 2/2)	Edward Golding – sat elsewhere Replaced by Robert Wigram (senior) 1802	Tory; Tory
== G ==
Galway	Denis Bowes Daly – resigned Replaced by James Daly 1805	
County Galway (seat 1/2)	Richard Le Poer Trench – resigned Replaced by Denis Bowes Daly	Tory; Whig
County Galway (seat 2/2)	Richard Martin	Ind
Gatton (seat 1/2)	Sir Mark Wood, Bt	
Gatton (seat 2/2)	James Dashwood – resigned Replaced by Philip Dundas 1803 – resigned Replaced by William Garrow 1805	
Glamorganshire (seat 1/1)	Thomas Wyndham	
Glasgow Burghs (seat 1/1)	Alexander Houstoun; Replaced by Boyd Alexander 1803	
Gloucester (seat 1/2)	Henry Thomas Howard; Replaced by Robert Morris 1805	Whig
Gloucester (seat 2/2)	John Pitt – died Replaced by Robert Morris 1805	Tory; Whig
Gloucestershire (seat 1/2)	Marquess of Worcester – ennobled Replaced by Lord Edward Somerset 1803	Tory; Tory
Gloucestershire (seat 2/2)	Hon. George Cranfield Berkeley	Whig
Grampound (seat 1/2)	Sir Christopher Hawkins, Bt	Tory
Grampound (seat 2/2)	Benjamin Hobhouse	
Grantham (seat 1/2)	Thomas Thoroton	
Grantham (seat 2/2)	Sir William Earle Welby, Bt	
Great Bedwyn (seat 1/2)	Robert John Buxton	
Great Bedwyn (seat 2/2)	Sir Nathaniel Dance-Holland, Bt	
Great Grimsby (seat 1/2)	Ayscoghe Boucherett – resigned Replaced by Hon. Charles Anderson-Pelham 1803	
Great Grimsby (seat 2/2)	Colonel John Henry Loft; Replaced by William Mellish 1803	
Great Marlow (seat 1/2)	Thomas Williams – died Replaced by Pascoe Grenfell 1802	
Great Marlow (seat 2/2)	Owen Williams	
Great Yarmouth (seat 1/2)	Captain Sir Thomas Troubridge	
Great Yarmouth (seat 2/2)	Thomas Jervis	
Guildford (seat 1/2)	Viscount Cranley	Whig
Guildford (seat 2/2)	Chapple Norton	
== H ==
Haddington Burghs (seat 1/1)	Hon. Thomas Maitland – appointed to office Replaced by Sir John Hamilton-Dalrymple, 5th Baronet 1805 – resigned Replaced by Henry Erskine 1806	Whig
Haddingtonshire (seat 1/1)	Charles Hope	
Hampshire (seat 1/2)	Sir William Heathcote, Bt	
Hampshire (seat 2/2)	William John Chute	
Harwich (seat 1/2)	Thomas Myers; Replaced by James Adams 1803	
Harwich (seat 2/2)	John Robinson – died Replaced by John Hiley Addington 1803	
Haslemere (seat 1/2)	George Wood	
Haslemere (seat 2/2)	Richard Penn	
Hastings (seat 1/2)	The Lord Glenbervie	
Hastings (seat 2/2)	George William Gunning	
Haverfordwest (seat 1/1)	The 2nd Baron Kensington 1802	
Hedon (seat 1/2)	George Johnstone	
Hedon (seat 2/2)	Christopher Atkinson	
Helston (seat 1/2)	Viscount Fitzharris – appointed to office Replaced by Davies Giddy 1804 – resigned Replaced by Sir John Shelley, Bt 1806	Tory
Helston (seat 2/2)	John Penn resigned Replaced by Viscount Primrose 1805	
Hereford (seat 1/2)	Thomas Powell Symonds	
Hereford (seat 2/2)	John Scudamore jnr – died Replaced by Richard Philip Scudamore 1805	
Herefordshire (seat 1/2)	Sir George Cornewall, Bt	Tory
Herefordshire (seat 2/2)	John Cotterell – declared void Replaced by John Matthews 1803	
Hertford (seat 1/2)	Hon. Edward Spencer Cowper	Whig
Hertford (seat 2/2)	Nicolson Calvert	Whig
Hertfordshire (seat 1/2)	William Plumer	
Hertfordshire (seat 2/2)	Hon. Peniston Lamb – died Replaced by William Baker 1805	Tory
Heytesbury (seat 1/2)	Charles Abbot – sat for Woodstock; Replaced by Dr Charles Moore 1802	
Heytesbury (seat 2/2)	Viscount Kirkwall	
Higham Ferrers (seat 1/1)	Francis Ferrand Foljambe	
Hindon (seat 1/2)	Thomas Wallace	
Hindon (seat 2/2)	John Pedley	
Honiton (seat 1/2)	Sir John Honywood – died Replaced by Richard Bateman-Robson 1806	
Honiton (seat 2/2)	George Shum – died Replaced by Augustus Cavendish-Bradshaw 1805	
Horsham (seat 1/2)	Edward Hilliard	
Horsham (seat 2/2)	Patrick Ross – died Replaced by Viscount FitzHarris 1804	
Huntingdon (seat 1/2)	William Henry Fellowes	
Huntingdon (seat 2/2)	John Calvert	
Huntingdonshire (seat 1/2)	Viscount Hinchingbrooke	
Huntingdonshire (seat 2/2)	Lord Frederick Montagu	
Hythe (seat 1/2)	Matthew White	
Hythe (seat 2/2)	Thomas Godfrey	
== I ==
Ilchester (seat 1/2)	William Hunter – declared void Replaced by Charles Brooke 1803	
Ilchester (seat 2/2)	Thomas Plummer – declared void Replaced by Sir William Manners, Bt 1803 – declared void Replaced by John Manners 1804	Tory
Inverness Burghs (seat 1/1)	Alexander Penrose Cumming-Gordon; Replaced by George Cumming 1803	
Inverness-shire (seat 1/1)	Charles Grant (senior)	Pittite/Tory
Ipswich (seat 1/2)	Sir Andrew Hamond, Bt	
Ipswich (seat 2/2)	Charles Alexander Crickitt – died Replaced by William Middleton 1803	
== K ==
Kent (seat 1/2)	Filmer Honywood	Whig
Kent (seat 2/2)	Sir William Geary, Bt	Tory
County Kerry (seat 1/2)	James Crosbie	Tory
County Kerry (seat 2/2)	Rt Hon. Maurice Fitzgerald	Whig
County Kildare (seat 1/2)	Lord Robert Stephen FitzGerald	Whig
County Kildare (seat 2/2)	Robert La Touche	
Kilkenny	Hon. Charles Harward Butler	Whig
County Kilkenny (seat 1/2)	Rt Hon. William Brabazon Ponsonby – ennobled Replaced by George Ponsonby 1806	Whig
County Kilkenny (seat 2/2)	Hon. James Wandesford Butler	Whig
Kincardineshire (seat 1/1)	Sir John Wishart-Belsches, Bt	
King's County (seat 1/2)	Sir Lawrence Parsons, Bt	
King's County (seat 2/2)	Thomas Bernard	
King's Lynn (seat 1/2)	Hon. Horatio Walpole	
King's Lynn (seat 2/2)	Sir Martin ffolkes, Bt	
Kingston upon Hull (seat 1/2)	Samuel Thornton	
Kingston upon Hull (seat 2/2)	John Staniforth	
Kinross-shire (seat1/1)	William Douglas Maclean Clephane – appointed to office Replaced by David Clephane 1803	
Kinsale	Samuel Campbell Rowley – resigned Replaced by Henry Martin 1806	
Kirkcudbright Stewartry (seat 1/1)	Patrick Heron; Replaced by Montgomery Granville John Stewart 1803	Whig; Tory
Knaresborough (seat 1/2)	James Hare – died Replaced by William Cavendish 1804 resigned no return made due to riot 1804; Replaced by Viscount Duncannon 1805	Whig; Whig>br> Whig
Knaresborough (seat 2/2)	Lord John Townshend	Whig
== L ==
Lanarkshire (seat 1/1)	Lord Archibald Hamilton	Whig
Lancashire (seat 1/2)	Thomas Stanley	
Lancashire (seat 2/2)	John Blackburne	
Lancaster (seat 1/2)	Alexander Hamilton, 10th Duke of Hamilton	Whig
Lancaster (seat 2/2)	John Dent	
Launceston (seat 1/2)	Richard Bennet	Whig
Launceston (seat 2/2)	James Brogden	Tory
Leicester (seat 1/2)	Thomas Babington	
Leicester (seat 2/2)	Samuel Smith	
Leicestershire (seat 1/2)	Sir Edmund Cradock-Hartopp, Bt	
Leicestershire (seat 2/2)	George Anthony Legh Keck	
County Leitrim (seat 1/2)	Viscount Clements – ennobled Replaced by Henry John Clements 1805	Whig; Tory
County Leitrim (seat 2/2)	Peter La Touche	
Leominster (seat 1/2)	John Lubbock	
Leominster (seat 2/2)	Charles Kinnaird – ennobled Replaced by William Lamb 1806	Whig
Lewes (seat 1/2)	Henry Shelley	
Lewes (seat 2/2)	Lord Francis Osborne	
Lichfield (seat 1/2)	Sir John Wrottesley, Bt	Whig
Lichfield (seat 2/2)	Thomas Anson – ennobled Replaced by Sir George Anson 1806	Whig
Limerick	Charles Vereker	Tory
County Limerick (seat 1/2)	Charles Silver Oliver	
County Limerick (seat 2/2)	William Odell	
Lincoln (seat 1/2)	Humphrey Sibthorp	
Lincoln (seat 2/2)	Richard Ellison	
Lincolnshire (seat 1/2)	Sir Gilbert Heathcote, Bt	
Lincolnshire (seat 2/2)	Charles Chaplin	
Linlithgow Burghs (seat 1/1)	William Dickson	
Linlithgowshire (seat 1/1)	Sir Alexander Hope	
Lisburn	Earl of Yarmouth	Tory
Liskeard (seat 1/2)	William Eliot	Tory
Liskeard (seat 2/2)	Hon. Hon. John Eliot double return Replaced by William Huskisson 1804	Tory
Liverpool (seat 1/2)	Isaac Gascoyne	Tory
Liverpool (seat 2/2)	Banastre Tarleton	Tory
London (City of) (seat 1/4)	William Curtis	Tory
London (City of) (seat 2/4)	Sir John William Anderson, Bt	Tory
London (City of) (seat 3/4)	Sir Charles Price	Tory
London (City of) (seat 4/4)	Harvey Christian Combe	Whig
Londonderry	Sir George Hill, Bt	Tory
County Londonderry (seat 1/2)	Hon. Charles William Stewart	Tory
County Londonderry (seat 2/2)	Lord George Thomas Beresford	Tory
County Longford (seat 1/2)	Sir Thomas Fetherston, Bt	
County Longford (seat 2/2)	Hon. Thomas Gleadowe-Newcomen	
Lostwithiel (seat 1/2)	Hans Sloane	
Lostwithiel (seat 2/2)	William Dickinson	
County Louth (seat 1/2)	John Foster	
County Louth (seat 2/2)	William Charles Fortescue	
Ludgershall (seat 1/2)	Earl of Dalkieth – resigned Replaced by Magens Dorrien-Magens 1804	Tory; Tory
Ludgershall (seat 2/2)	Thomas Everett	Tory
Ludlow (seat 1/2)	Richard Payne Knight	
Ludlow (seat 2/2)	Robert Clive	
Lyme Regis (seat 1/2)	Henry Fane	Tory
Lyme Regis (seat 2/2)	Thomas Fane – resigned Replaced by Lord Burghersh 1806	Tory
Lymington (seat 1/2)	William Manning	
Lymington (seat 2/2)	Harry Burrard – resigned Replaced by John Kingston 1802	
== M ==
Maidstone (seat 1/2)	Sir Matthew Bloxham	
Maidstone (seat 2/2)	John Hodsdon Durand	
Maldon (seat 1/2)	Joseph Holden Strutt	
Maldon (seat 2/2)	Charles Callis Western	
Mallow	Denham Jephson	Whig
Malmesbury (seat 1/2)	Claude Scott	
Malmesbury (seat 2/2)	Samuel Scott, Bt	
Malton (seat 1/2)	Charles Lawrence Dundas resigned Replaced by Henry Grattan 1805	Whig; Whig
Malton (seat 2/2)	Bryan Cooke	Whig
Marlborough (seat 1/2)	Charles Bruce, Lord Bruce	
Marlborough (seat 2/2)	James Henry Leigh	
County Mayo (seat 1/2)	Rt Hon. Denis Browne	
County Mayo (seat 2/2)	Henry Dillon-Lee	
County Meath (seat 1/2)	Thomas Cherburgh Bligh	
County Meath (seat 2/2)	Sir Marcus Somerville, Bt	
Merionethshire (seat 1/1)	Sir Robert Williames Vaughan	Tory
Middlesex (seat 1/2)	George Byng	Tory
Middlesex (seat 2/2)	Sir Francis Burdett, Bt – void Replaced by George Boulton Mainwaring 1804 – void Replaced by Sir Francis Burdett, Bt 1805 – void Replaced by George Boulton Mainwaring 1806	Whig; Tory; Whig; Tory
Midhurst (seat 1/2)	George Smith	
Midhurst (seat 2/2)	Samuel Smith – sat for Leicester; Replaced by Edmund Turnor	
Milborne Port (seat 1/2)	Henry Paget, Lord Paget – resigned Replaced by Captain Charles Paget 1804	
Milborne Port (seat 2/2)	Hugh Leycester	
Minehead (seat 1/2)	John Patteson	Tory
Minehead (seat 2/2)	John Fownes Luttrell	Tory
Mitchell (seat 1/2)	Robert Dallas – appointed to office Replaced by Earl of Dalkeith 1805	Tory
Mitchell (seat 2/2)	Robert Sharpe Ainslie	
County Monaghan (seat 1/2)	Richard Dawson	
County Monaghan (seat 2/2)	Charles Powell Leslie II,	
Monmouth Boroughs (seat 1/1)	Lord Charles Somerset	
Monmouthshire (seat 1/2)	Charles Morgan (formerly Gould)	
Monmouthshire (seat 2/2)	James Rooke – died Replaced by Capt Lord Arthur John Henry Somerset 1805	
Montgomery (seat 1/1)	Whitshed Keene	
Montgomeryshire (seat 1/1)	Charles Williams-Wynn	Tory
Morpeth (seat 1/2)	William Ord	Whig
Morpeth (seat 2/2)	Viscount Morpeth	
== N ==
Nairnshire (seat 0/0)	Alternated with Cromartyshire. No representation in 1802	
Newark (seat 1/2)	Thomas Manners-Sutton – appointed to office Replaced by Henry Willoughby 1805	Tory; Tory
Newark (seat 2/2)	Charles Morice Pole	
Newcastle-under-Lyme (seat 1/2)	Sir Robert Lawley	
Newcastle-under-Lyme (seat 2/2)	Edward Bootle-Wilbraham	
Newcastle-upon-Tyne (seat 1/2)	Charles John Brandling	Tory
Newcastle-upon-Tyne (seat 2/2)	Sir Matthew White Ridley, 2nd Baronet	Whig
Newport (Cornwall) (seat 1/2)	William Northey	Tory
Newport (Cornwall) (seat 2/2)	Joseph Richardson – died Replaced by Edward Morris 1803	Whig
Newport (Isle of Wight) (seat 1/2)	John Blackburn	
Newport (Isle of Wight) (seat 2/2)	Richard Gervas Ker	
Newry	Rt Hon. Isaac Corry	Whig
New Radnor Boroughs (seat 1/1)	Richard Price	Tory
New Romney (seat 1/2)	Manasseh Lopes	
New Romney (seat 2/2)	John Willett Willett	
New Ross	Charles Tottenham (I) – resigned Replaced by Ponsonby Tottenham 1805	
New Shoreham (seat 1/2)	Sir Cecil Bisshopp, Bt	
New Shoreham (seat 2/2)	Timothy Shelley	
Newton (Lancashire) (seat 1/2)	Peter Patten	
Newton (Lancashire) (seat 2/2)	Thomas Brooke	
Newtown (Isle of Wight) (seat 1/2)	Sir Robert Barclay	Whig
Newtown (Isle of Wight) (seat 2/2)	Charles Chapman – resigned Replaced by James Paull 1803	Whig; Whig
New Windsor (seat 1/2)	Hon. Robert Fulke Greville	Tory
New Windsor (seat 2/2)	John Williams election void Arthur Vansittart 1804	Tory; Tory
New Woodstock (seat 1/2)	Sir Henry Dashwood, Bt	
New Woodstock (seat 2/2)	Charles Abbot	Speaker
Norfolk (seat 1/2)	Thomas Coke	Whig
Norfolk (seat 2/2)	Jacob Astley	
Northallerton (seat 1/2)	Hon. Edward Lascelles	Tory
Northallerton (seat 2/2)	Henry Peirse	Whig
Northampton (seat 1/2)	Hon. Spencer Perceval	
Northampton (seat 2/2)	Hon. Edward Bouverie	
Northamptonshire (seat 1/2)	Francis Dickins	
Northamptonshire (seat 2/2)	William Ralph Cartwright	
Northumberland (seat 1/2)	Charles Grey	
Northumberland (seat 2/2)	Thomas Richard Beaumont	
Norwich (seat 1/2)	Robert Fellowes	
Norwich (seat 2/2)	William Smith	Radical
Nottingham (seat 1/2)	Joseph Birch – unseated on petition Replaced by Daniel Parker Coke 1803	
Nottingham (seat 2/2)	Sir John Borlase Warren, Bt	
Nottinghamshire (seat 1/2)	Lord William Bentinck – appointed to office Replaced by Anthony Hardolph Eyre 1803	Whig
Nottinghamshire (seat 2/2)	Hon. Charles Pierrepont	
== O ==
Okehampton (seat 1/2)	Henry Holland, junior	Whig
Okehampton (seat 2/2)	James Charles Stuart Strange – resigned Replaced by Viscount Althorp 1804	Whig; Whig
Old Sarum (seat 1/2)	Nicholas Vansittart	Tory
Old Sarum (seat 2/2)	Henry Alexander	Tory
Orford (seat 1/2)	Lord Robert Seymour	Tory
Orford (seat 2/2)	James Trail	Tory
Orkney and Shetland (seat 1/1)	Robert Honyman	
Oxford (seat 1/2)	Francis Burton	
Oxford (seat 2/2)	John Atkyns-Wright	
Oxfordshire (seat 1/2)	Lord Francis Spencer	Whig
Oxfordshire (seat 2/2)	John Fane	Tory
Oxford University (seat 1/2)	Sir William Scott	Tory
Oxford University (seat 2/2)	Sir William Dolben, Bt	Tory
== P ==
Peeblesshire (seat 1/1)	James Montgomery	
Pembroke Boroughs (seat 1/1)	Hugh Barlow	Whig
Pembrokeshire (seat 1/1)	Richard Philipps, 1st Baron Milford	
Penryn (seat 1/2)	Sir Stephen Lushington, Bt	Tory
Penryn (seat 2/2)	Sir John Nicholl	Tory
Perth Burghs (seat 1/1)	David Scott – died Replaced by Sir David Wedderburn, Bt 1805	Tory
Perthshire (seat 1/1)	Thomas Graham	
Peterborough (seat 1/2)	French Laurence	Whig
Peterborough (seat 2/2)	William Elliot	Whig
Petersfield (seat 1/2)	Hylton Jolliffe	
Petersfield (seat 2/2)	Sir John Sinclair, 1st Baronet; Replaced by William Draper Best 1802	
Plymouth (seat 1/2)	Philip Langmead – resigned Replaced by Thomas Tyrwhitt 1806	
Plymouth (seat 2/2)	William Elford	
Plympton Erle (seat 1/2)	Edward Golding	Addingtonian
Plympton Erle (seat 2/2)	Philip Metcalfe	Addingtonian
Pontefract (seat 1/2)	Richard Benyon	
Pontefract (seat 2/2)	John Smyth	
Poole (seat 1/2)	George Garland	
Poole (seat 2/2)	John Jeffery	
Portarlington	Henry Brook Parnell – resigned Replaced by Thomas Tyrwhitt 1802 – resigned Replaced by John Langston 1806	Whig
Portsmouth (seat 1/2)	John Markham	Whig
Portsmouth (seat 2/2)	Hon. Thomas Erskine appointed to office Replaced by Hon. David Erskine 1806	Whig
Preston (seat 1/2)	Lord Stanley	Whig
Preston (seat 2/2)	John Horrocks died Replaced by Samuel Horrocks	Tory; Tory
== Q ==
Queenborough (seat 1/2)	John Prinsep	Whig
Queenborough (seat 2/2)	George Peter Moore – resigned Replaced by Sir Samuel Romilly 1806	Whig; Whig
Queen's County (seat 1/2)	by Hon. William Wellesley-Pole	
Queen's County (seat 2/2)	Sir Eyre Coote – appointed to office Replaced by Henry Brooke Parnell 1806	Whig
== R ==
Radnorshire (seat 1/1)	Walter Wilkins	Whig
Reading (seat 1/2)	Charles Shaw-Lefevre	
Reading (seat 2/2)	Francis Annesley	
Reigate (seat 1/2)	Hon. John Somers Cocks – ennobled Replaced by Philip James Cocks 1806	
Reigate (seat 2/2)	Joseph Sydney Yorke	Tory
Renfrewshire (seat 1/1)	Boyd Alexander	
Richmond (Yorkshire) (seat 1/2)	Arthur Shakespeare	Whig
Richmond (Yorkshire) (seat 2/2)	George Heneage Lawrence Dundas – resigned Replaced by Charles Lawrence Dundas 1806	Whig
Ripon (seat 1/2)	Sir James Graham, Bt	Tory
Ripon (seat 2/2)	John Heathcote	Tory
Rochester (seat 1/2)	Captain Sir Sidney Smith	
Rochester (seat 2/2)	James Hulkes	
County Roscommon (seat 1/2)	Arthur French	Whig
County Roscommon (seat 2/2)	Edward King	Whig
Ross-shire (seat 1/1)	Sir Charles Lockhart-Ross, Bt.	
Roxburghshire (seat 1/1)	Sir George Douglas	
Rutland (seat 1/2)	Gerard Noel Edwardes	Whig
Rutland (seat 2/2)	The Lord Carbery – died Replaced by The Lord Henniker 1805	
Rye (seat 1/2)	Thomas Davis Lamb – resigned Replaced by Major General the Hon. Sir Arthur Wellesley	Tory; Tory
Rye (seat 2/2)	Hon. Robert Banks Jenkinson ennobled Replaced by Sir Charles Talbot 1803	Tory
== S ==
St Albans (seat 1/2)	William Stephen Poyntz	Whig
St Albans (seat 2/2)	Hon. James Grimston	Tory
St Germans (seat 1/2)	Lord Binning	Tory
St Germans (seat 2/2)	James Langham	
St Ives (seat 1/2)	William Praed	
St Ives (seat 2/2)	Jonathan Raine	
St Mawes (seat 1/2)	Sir William Young, Bt	Tory
St Mawes (seat 2/2)	William Windham	Tory
Salisbury (seat 1/2)	Viscount Folkestone	
Salisbury (seat 2/2)	William Hussey	
Saltash (seat 1/2)	Matthew Russell	
Saltash (seat 2/2)	Robert Deverell	
Sandwich (seat 1/2)	Sir Philip Stephens, Bt	
Sandwich (seat 2/2)	Sir Horatio Mann, Bt	
Scarborough (seat 1/2)	Lord Robert Manners	Tory
Scarborough (seat 2/2)	Hon. Edmund Phipps	Tory
Seaford (seat 1/2)	Charles Rose Ellis	Tory
Seaford (seat 2/2)	Richard Joseph Sullivan – died Replaced by John Leach 1806	Tory
Selkirkshire (seat 1/1)	John Rutherford	
Shaftesbury (seat 1/2)	Edward Loveden Loveden	Whig
Shaftesbury (seat 2/2)	Robert Hurst	
Shrewsbury (seat 1/2)	Sir William Pulteney, Bt – died Replaced by John Hill 1805	Whig; Tory
Shrewsbury (seat 2/2)	Hon. William Hill	Tory
Shropshire (seat 1/2)	John Kynaston (later Powell)	
Shropshire (seat 2/2)	Sir Richard Hill, Bt	
Sligo	Owen Wynne – resigned Replaced by Col. George Canning 1806	Tory; Tory
County Sligo (seat 1/2)	Joshua Edward Cooper	Tory
County Sligo (seat 2/2)	Charles O'Hara	Tory
Somerset (seat 1/2)	William Dickinson – died Replaced by Thomas Lethbridge	Tory; Tory
Somerset (seat 2/2)	William Gore-Langton	Whig
Southampton (seat 1/2)	George Henry Rose	
Southampton (seat 2/2)	James Amyatt	
Southwark (seat 1/2)	Henry Thornton	Independent
Southwark (seat 2/2)	George Tierney	Whig
Stafford (seat 1/2)	Edward Monckton	Tory
Stafford (seat 2/2)	Richard Brinsley Sheridan	Whig
Staffordshire (seat 1/2)	Sir Edward Littleton, Bt	Whig
Staffordshire (seat 2/2)	Lord Granville Leveson-Gower	Whig
Stamford (seat 1/2)	Albemarle Bertie	Tory
Stamford (seat 2/2)	John Leland	Tory
Steyning (seat 1/2)	James Lloyd – resigned Replaced by Sir Arthur Leary Piggott 1806	Whig; Whig
Steyning (seat 2/2)	Robert Hurst – sat for Shaftesbury; Replaced by Lord Ossulston 1803	Whig; Whig
Stirling Burghs (seat 1/1)	Alexander Forrester Inglis Cochrane	
Stirlingshire (seat 1/1)	Charles Elphinstone Fleeming	
Stockbridge (seat 1/2)	Joseph Foster Barham	Whig
Stockbridge (seat 2/2)	George Porter	Whig
Sudbury (seat 1/2)	Sir John Coxe Hippisley	
Sudbury (seat 2/2)	John Pytches	
Suffolk (seat 1/2)	Sir Charles Bunbury, Bt	
Suffolk (seat 2/2)	Charles Cornwallis, Viscount Brome – ennobled Replaced by Thomas Gooch 1806	
Surrey (seat 1/2)	Lord William Russell	Whig
Surrey (seat 2/2)	Sir John Frederick, Bt	Tory
Sussex (seat 1/2)	John Fuller	
Sussex (seat 2/2)	Charles Lennox	
Sutherland (seat 1/1)	William Dundas	Tory
== T ==
Tain Burghs (seat 1/1)	John Villiers – resigned James MacDonald	
Tamworth (seat 1/2)	William Loftus	
Tamworth (seat 2/2)	Sir Robert Peel	Tory
Taunton (seat 1/2)	William Morland	
Taunton (seat 2/2)	John Hammet	
Tavistock (seat 1/2)	Lord Robert Spencer	Whig
Tavistock (seat 2/2)	Hon. Richard FitzPatrick	Whig
Tewkesbury (seat 1/2)	James Martin	Whig
Tewkesbury (seat 2/2)	Christopher Bethell Codrington	Tory
Thetford (seat 1/2)	John Harrison	
Thetford (seat 2/2)	Thomas Creevey	
Thirsk (seat 1/2)	William Frankland	
Thirsk (seat 2/2)	Sir Gregory Page-Turner, Bt – died Replaced by Hon. Richard Griffin 1805	
County Tipperary (seat 1/2)	Viscount Mathew	
County Tipperary (seat 2/2)	John Bagwell (1751-1816)	
Tiverton (seat 1/2)	Hon. Dudley Ryder ennobled Replaced by William Fitzhugh1803	Tory; Tory
Tiverton (seat 2/2)	Hon. Richard Ryder	Tory
Totnes (seat 1/2)	John Berkeley Burland died Vicary Gibbs 1804	
Totnes (seat 2/2)	William Adams	
Tralee	Rt Hon. George Canning	Tory
Tregony (seat 1/2)	Marquess of Blandford – appointed to office Replaced by George Woodford Thellusson 1804	Tory; Tory
Tregony (seat 2/2)	Charles Cockerell	
Truro (seat 1/2)	Captain Edward Leveson-Gower	Tory
Truro (seat 2/2)	John Lemon	Whig
County Tyrone (seat 1/2)	Rt Hon. John Stewart	Tory
County Tyrone (seat 2/2)	James Stewart	
== W ==
Wallingford (seat 1/2)	William Hughes	Whig
Wallingford (seat 2/2)	Sir Francis Sykes, Bt – died Replaced by George Galway Mills 1804	Tory; Tory
Wareham (seat 1/2)	John Calcraft	Whig
Wareham (seat 2/2)	Andrew Strahan	
Warwick (seat 1/2)	Charles Mills	
Warwick (seat 2/2)	Lord Brooke	
Warwickshire (seat 1/2)	Dugdale Stratford Dugdale	
Warwickshire (seat 2/2)	Sir George Augustus William Shuckburgh-Evelyn, Bt died Replaced by Charles Mordaunt 1804	
Waterford	William Congreve Alcock – unseated on petition Replaced by Sir John Newport, Bt. 1803	Tory; Whig
County Waterford (seat 1/2)	Rt Hon. John Beresford – died Replaced by John Claudius Beresford 1806	Tory
County Waterford (seat 2/2)	Edward Lee	Whig
Wells (seat 1/2)	Charles William Taylor	Whig
Wells (seat 2/2)	Clement Tudway	
Wendover (seat 1/2)	Charles Long	Tory
Wendover (seat 2/2)	John Smith	Tory
Wenlock (seat 1/2)	John Simpson	
Wenlock (seat 2/2)	Cecil Forester	
Weobley (seat 1/2)	Lord George Thynne	
Weobley (seat 2/2)	Robert Steele	
Westbury (seat 1/2)	William Baldwin	
Westbury (seat 2/2)	Charles Smith	
County Westmeath (seat 1/2)	William Smyth	
County Westmeath	Gustavus Hume-Rochfort	
West Looe (seat 1/2)	James Buller resigned Replaced by Ralph Allen Daniell 1805	
West Looe (seat 2/2)	Thomas Smith – resigned Replaced by Quintin Dick 1803	
Westminster (seat 1/2)	Hon. Charles James Fox – died Replaced by Earl Percy 1806	Foxite Whig
Westminster (seat 2/2)	Sir Alan Gardner, Bt	Tory
Westmorland (seat 1/2)	James Lowther	Tory
Westmorland (seat 2/2)	Sir Michael le Fleming, Bt – died Replaced by The Lord Muncaster 1806	Tory; Tory
Wexford	Richard Nevill	Tory
County Wexford (seat 1/2)	Viscount Loftus ennobled Replaced by Caesar Colclough 1806	Tory
County Wexford (seat 2/2)	Abel Ram	Tory
Weymouth and Melcombe Regis (seat 1/4)	Sir James Pulteney, Bt (formerly Murray)	Tory
Weymouth and Melcombe Regis (seat 2/4)	William Garthshore – died Replaced by Richard Augustus Tucker Steward 1806	Tory
Weymouth and Melcombe Regis (seat 3/4)	Charles Adams	Tory
Weymouth and Melcombe Regis (seat 4/4)	Gabriel Tucker Steward	Tory
Whitchurch (seat 1/2)	Hon. William Augustus Townshend	
Whitchurch (seat 2/2)	William Brodrick	
County Wicklow (seat 1/2)	William Hoare Hume	Whig
County Wicklow (seat 2/2)	George Ponsonby – appointed to office Replaced by William Tighe	Whig
Wigan (seat 1/2)	John Hodson	Tory
Wigan (seat 2/2)	Sir Robert Holt Leigh	Tory
Wigtown Burghs (seat 1/1)	John Spalding resigned Replaced by William Stewart 1803 – resigned Replaced by James Graham 1805	
Wigtownshire (seat 1/1)	Andrew McDouall – resigned Replaced by William Maxwell 1805	
Wilton (seat 1/2)	John Spencer – appointed to office Replaced by Ralph Sheldon 1804	
Wilton (seat 2/2)	Viscount FitzWilliam – resigned Replaced by Charles Herbert 1806	
Wiltshire (seat 1/2)	Henry Penruddocke Wyndham	Whig
Wiltshire (seat 2/2)	Ambrose Goddard	
Winchelsea (seat 1/2)	Robert Ladbroke	Whig
Winchelsea (seat 2/2)	William Moffat	Whig
Winchester (seat 1/2)	Sir Henry St John-Mildmay, Bt	
Winchester (seat 2/2)	Richard Grace Gamon	
Wootton Bassett (seat 1/2)	General the Hon. Henry St John – resigned Replaced by Peter William Baker 1802	Tory
Wootton Bassett (seat 2/2)	Robert Williams	
Worcester (seat 1/2)	Joseph Scott	Whig
Worcester (seat 2/2)	Abraham Robarts	Whig
Worcestershire (seat 1/2)	Edward Foley – died Replaced by John Ward 1803	Tory
Worcestershire (seat 2/2)	William Lygon – ennobled Replaced by William Lygon 1806	
== Y ==
Yarmouth (Isle of Wight) (seat 1/2)	Jervoise Clarke Jervoise	Whig
Yarmouth (Isle of Wight) (seat 2/2)	James Patrick Murray – resigned Replaced by Colonel Charles Macdonnell 1803 – died Replaced by Henry Swann 1803 – resigned Replaced by John Delgarno 1804 – resigned Replaced by Captain Sir Home Riggs Popham 1804 – resigned Replaced by David Scott 1806	
York (seat 1/2)	Sir William Mordaunt Milner, Bt.	Whig
York (seat 2/2)	Lawrence Dundas	Whig
Yorkshire (seat 1/2)	Hon. Henry Lascelles	Tory
Yorkshire (seat 2/2)	William Wilberforce	Tory
Youghal	Sir John Keane, Bt	Tory

== By-elections ==
- List of United Kingdom by-elections (1801–1806)

== See also ==
- 1802 United Kingdom general election
- List of parliaments of the United Kingdom
- Members of the 2nd UK Parliament from Ireland
- Unreformed House of Commons
