= Earl Talbot (East Indiaman) =

Three vessels named Earl Talbot for one of the Earls Talbot served in the 18th and 19th centuries as East Indiamen for the British East India Company (EIC):

- Earl Talbot (1778 EIC ship) made six voyages to India for the EIC between 1778 and 1793.
- In 1795 the EIC sold the second Earl Talbot to the Royal Navy while she was still on the stocks. The Navy renamed her HMS Agincourt. She became the prison ship HMS Bristol in 1812, and was sold for immediate break-up in 1814.
- Earl Talbot (1797 EIC ship) was launched in 1797. She made one full voyage for the EIC but was lost near China on the outward bound leg of her second voyage with the loss of her entire crew and passengers.
