= James O'Callaghan =

Anglo-Irish politician

Member of Parliament for Tregony
- In office 1 November 1806 – 24 November 1812
- In office 19 June 1818 – 12 June 1826

Personal details
- Born: 17 October 1743
- Died: 14 February 1836 (aged 92)
- Party: Whig

James O'Callaghan (17 October 1743 – 14 February 1836) was an Anglo-Irish politician. He was member of parliament for Tregony from 1806 to 1812, and again from 1818 to 1826.

His nephew Cornelius O'Callaghan was MP in Ireland.

== See also ==
- List of MPs elected in the 1820 United Kingdom general election
- List of MPs elected in the 1818 United Kingdom general election
- List of MPs elected in the 1807 United Kingdom general election
- List of MPs elected in the 1806 United Kingdom general election
