= Joseph Huddart =

British rope maker

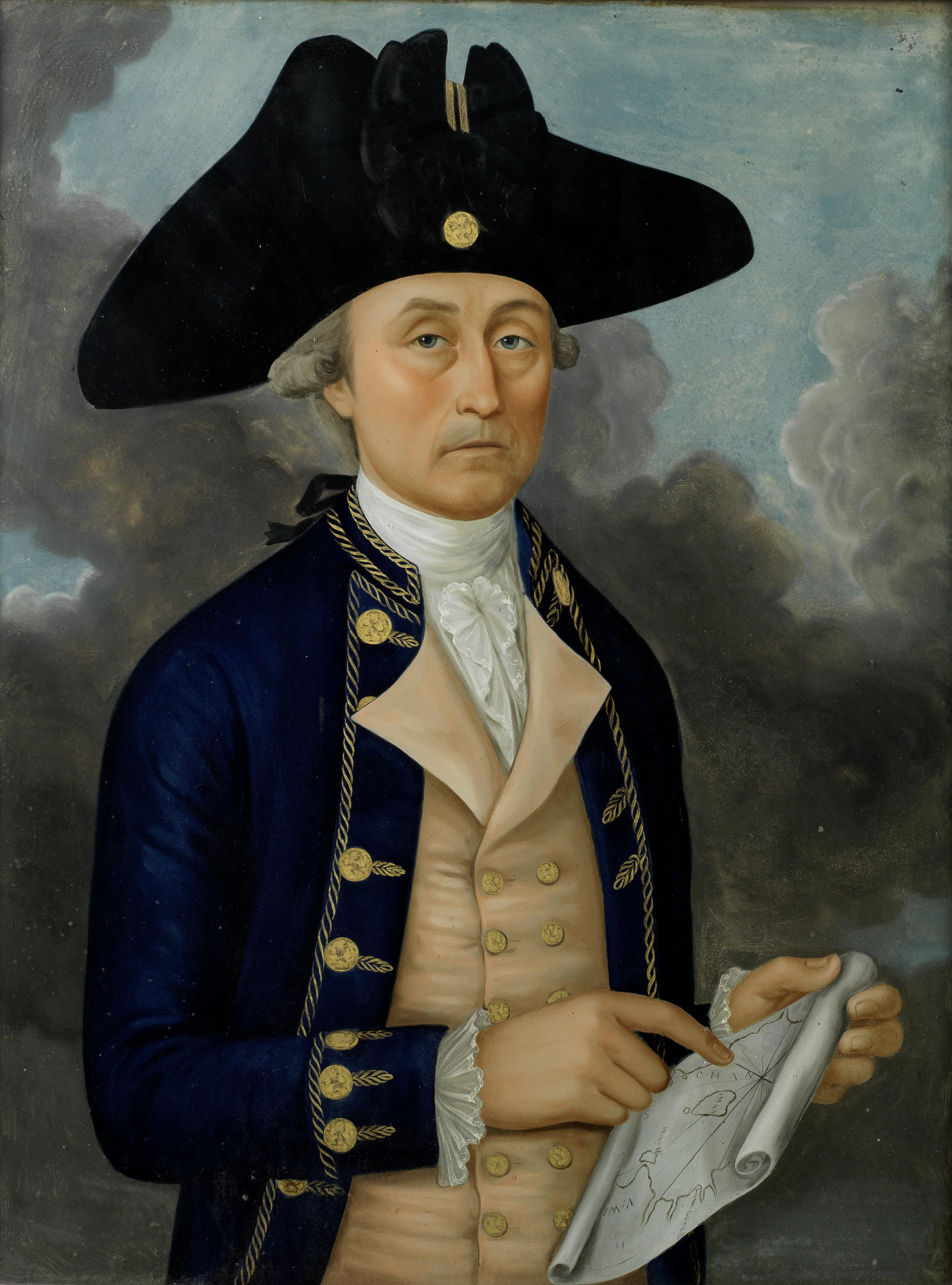
Capt. Joseph Huddart, in a Chinese reverse glass painting from c. 1785-9.

Joseph Huddart FRS (1741–1816) was a British hydrographer, engineer and inventor. He surveyed harbours and coasts but made a fortune from improving the design and manufacture of rope. He was highly regarded in his time, and his likeness featured in an engraving of distinguished men of science. Huddart was chosen to feature in the central group of the picture with M. I. Brunel, James Watt, Matthew Boulton and Thomas Telford.

== Biography ==
Huddart was born at Allonby near Maryport in Cumberland. Huddart's father was both a shoemaker, a farmer and a fish smoker. Huddart's natural talents were mathematics and mechanics. Huddart had built models of a mill and a ship of war merely from descriptions he had read about. He initially joined his father's fish processing business. His father had taken advantage of an unusual occurrence and joined with others to start the Herring Fishery Company. Shoals of fish had arrived in the Solway Firth and there was a profit for any who could preserve the fish for export. In 1762 his father died and Huddart inherited his father's share of the fish processing business.

The following year Huddart married Elizabeth Johnson. He took the role of captaining a brig which was used to trade along the Irish coast selling smoked fish for resale to the West Indies. Six years later he built an improved ship and studied the arts of surveying and navigation.

== Navigation ==
In 1771 he was introduced to Sir Richard Hotham, who had also come from humble beginnings. Hotham had influence with the East India Company and Huddart was related to Hotham by his marriage to one of Huddart's uncle's daughters.

In 1778 he started out on four voyages to the east, eventually in command of the East Indiaman Royal Admiral for her maiden and two subsequent voyages. He completed surveys of the coast of India and Sumatra. From 1788 he completed surveys of the Hebrides and in 1791 he became a fellow of the Royal Society and joined the management of Trinity House as an elder brother. He took charge of enquiries regarding light, lighthouses and charts and he supervised and directed the construction of the Hurst Point Lighthouse.

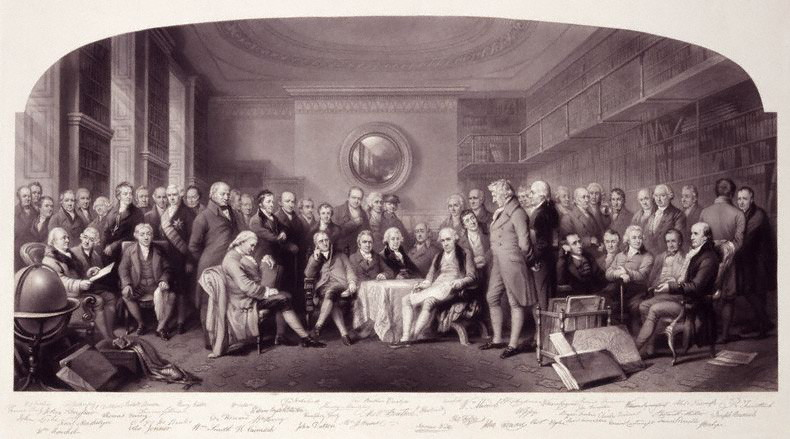
Distinguished Men of Science. Use the cursor to see who is who.

Huddart's guide to navigation to China and New Holland was published in 1801.

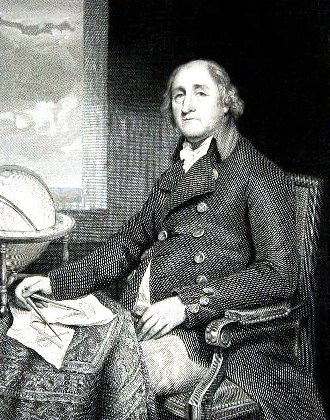
Joseph Huddart, 1802 engraving by James Stow after John Hoppner

== Rope manufacture ==
He spent some time studying and improving the techniques for manufacturing rope. He was able to improve the strength and reliability by improving the distribution of the stress equally amongst the fibres of the cable. He employed steam power to automate the production of rope. Huddart set up Huddart & Co. of Limehouse to manufacture rope, with Charles Hampden Turner, Sir Robert Wigram and John Woolmore as partners. He became rich from the sale of this improved rope, and in both 1809 and 1811 he purchased estates in Wales.

Huddart died in London in 1816 having fathered five sons. He was buried under St.Martin's-in-the-Fields in his uncle's vault. The institute of Civil Engineers had a copy of his portrait by John Hoppner. In 1865, William Walker published a book based around an engraving showing the "distinguished men" of 1807–8. The engraving included about fifty people and Huddart was chosen to feature in the central group with M. I. Brunel, James Watt, Matthew Boulton and Thomas Telford.

== Works ==
- The Oriental Navigator, or New directions for sailing to and from the East Indies, China, New Holland, (1801)
- Memoir of the late Captain Joseph Huddart, F. R. S., 1821 by his son

== See also ==
- Huddart (1803 EIC ship) - an East Indiaman that completed eight voyages for the British East India Company and that was wrecked in 1821
