= Glynn Wynn =

English politician

Glynn Wynn (1 September 1772 – 23 April 1809) was an English politician.

He was elected at the 1807 general election as a Member of Parliament (MP) for the rotten borough of Westbury in Wiltshire, but died in office two years later, aged 36.

Parliament of the United Kingdom
Preceded by John Woolmore; William Jacob	Member of Parliament for Westbury; 1807 – 1809; With: Edward Lascelles to July 1807; Henry Lascelles from July 1807	Succeeded by Henry Lascelles; Francis Whittle
