= Roselite =

Arsenate mineral

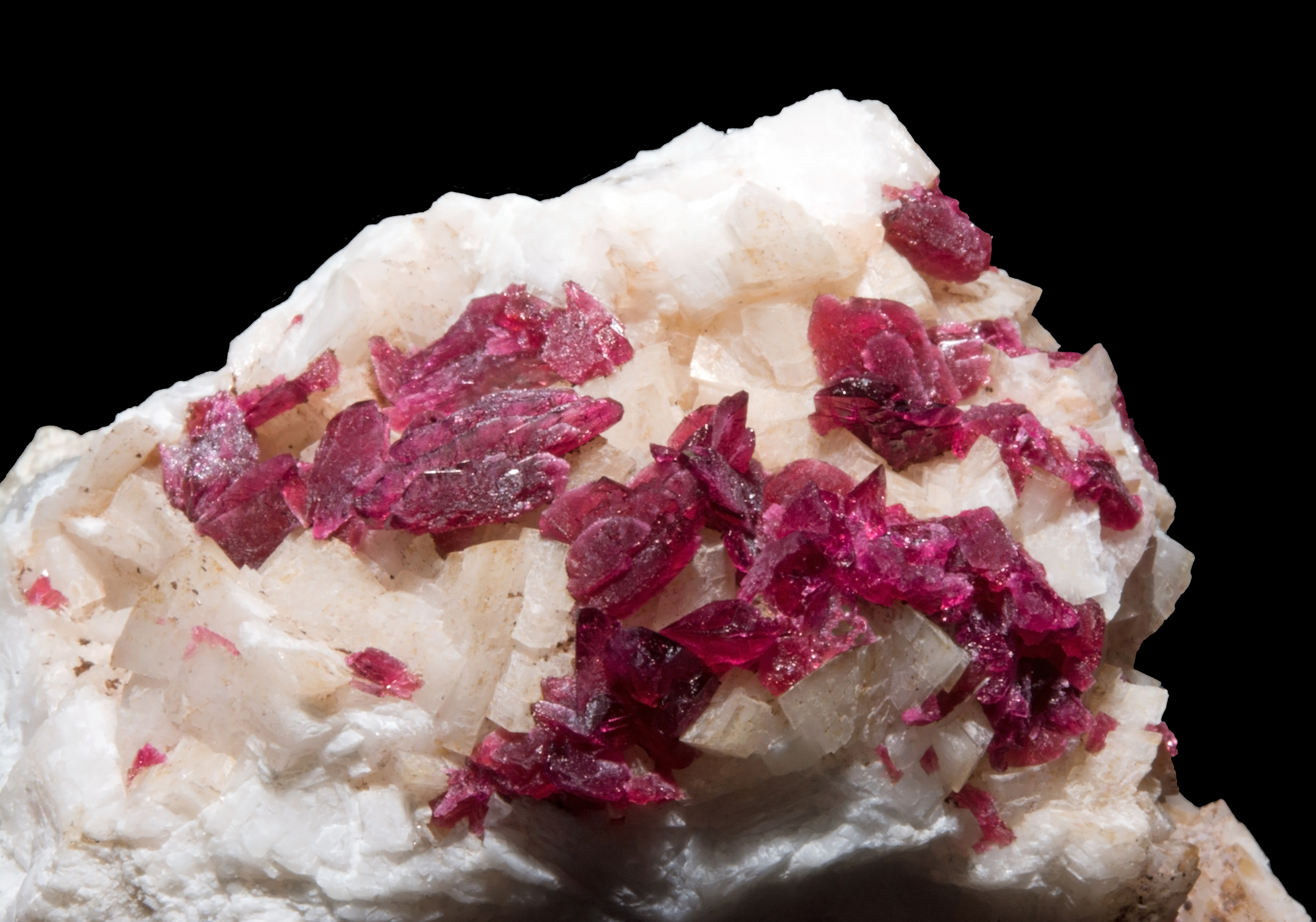

General
- Category: Arsenate minerals
- Formula: Ca_{2}(Co^{2+}, Mg)[AsO_{4}]_{2}·H_{2}O+
- IMA symbol: Rsl
- Strunz classification: 8.CG.10
- Crystal system: Monoclinic
- Crystal class: Prismatic (2/m) (same H-M symbol)
- Space group: P2_{1}/c
- Unit cell: a = 5.801 Å, b = 12.898 Å c = 5.617 Å; β = 107.42°; Z = 2

Identification
- Color: Dark rose red, pink
- Crystal habit: Elongated crystals and spherical aggregates and druses
- Twinning: Common as composition plane, contact twins and fourlings
- Cleavage: {010} Perfect
- Mohs scale hardness: 3.5
- Luster: Vitreous
- Streak: Light red
- Specific gravity: 3.69
- Optical properties: Biaxial (−)
- Refractive index: n_{α} = 1.725 n_{β} = 1.728 n_{γ} = 1.735
- Pleochroism: (Dark rose) X: Dark rose, Y: Pale rose, Z: Paler rose (Light rose) X: Pale rose, Y: Paler rose, Z: Palest rose
- 2V angle: Calculated: 68°

Roselite is a rare arsenate mineral with chemical formula: Ca_{2}(Co,Mg)[AsO_{4}]_{2}·H_{2}O. It was first described in 1825 for an occurrence in the Rappold mines of Schneeberg, Saxony, Germany and named by Armand Lévy after German mineralogist Gustav Rose. It occurs in cobalt-bearing hydrothermal environments and was associated with veins of quartz and chalcedony in the type locality. It has also been reported from Italy, Morocco, Chile, British Columbia and several locations in Germany.

The pleochroism of roselite depends on chemical composition with darker-rose-colored varieties higher in cobalt content and lighter-rose-colored varieties higher in calcium and magnesium content (Palache et al., 1960). This gives rise to two different pleochroism schemes, one for dark rose and one for light rose. Dark rose varieties have X: dark rose, Y: pale rose, Z: paler rose. Light rose varieties have X: pale rose, Y: paler rose, Z: palest rose.

== Bibliography ==
- Palache, P.; Berman H.; Frondel, C. (1960). "Dana's System of Mineralogy, Volume II: Halides, Nitrates, Borates, Carbonates, Sulfates, Phosphates, Arsenates, Tungstates, Molybdates, Etc. (Seventh Edition)" John Wiley and Sons, Inc., New York, pp. 723–725.
