= Charles Turner (merchant) =

British businessman; later gardener (1772–1856)

Charles Hampden Turner (1772–1856) was a British businessman, now known as a collector and gardener.

== Life ==
He was the son of John Turner of Narrow Street, Limehouse, a sailmaker and Dorothy Fowler. His sister Harriet married John Woolmore, the Member of Parliament.

He was educated at Merchant Taylors School, London.

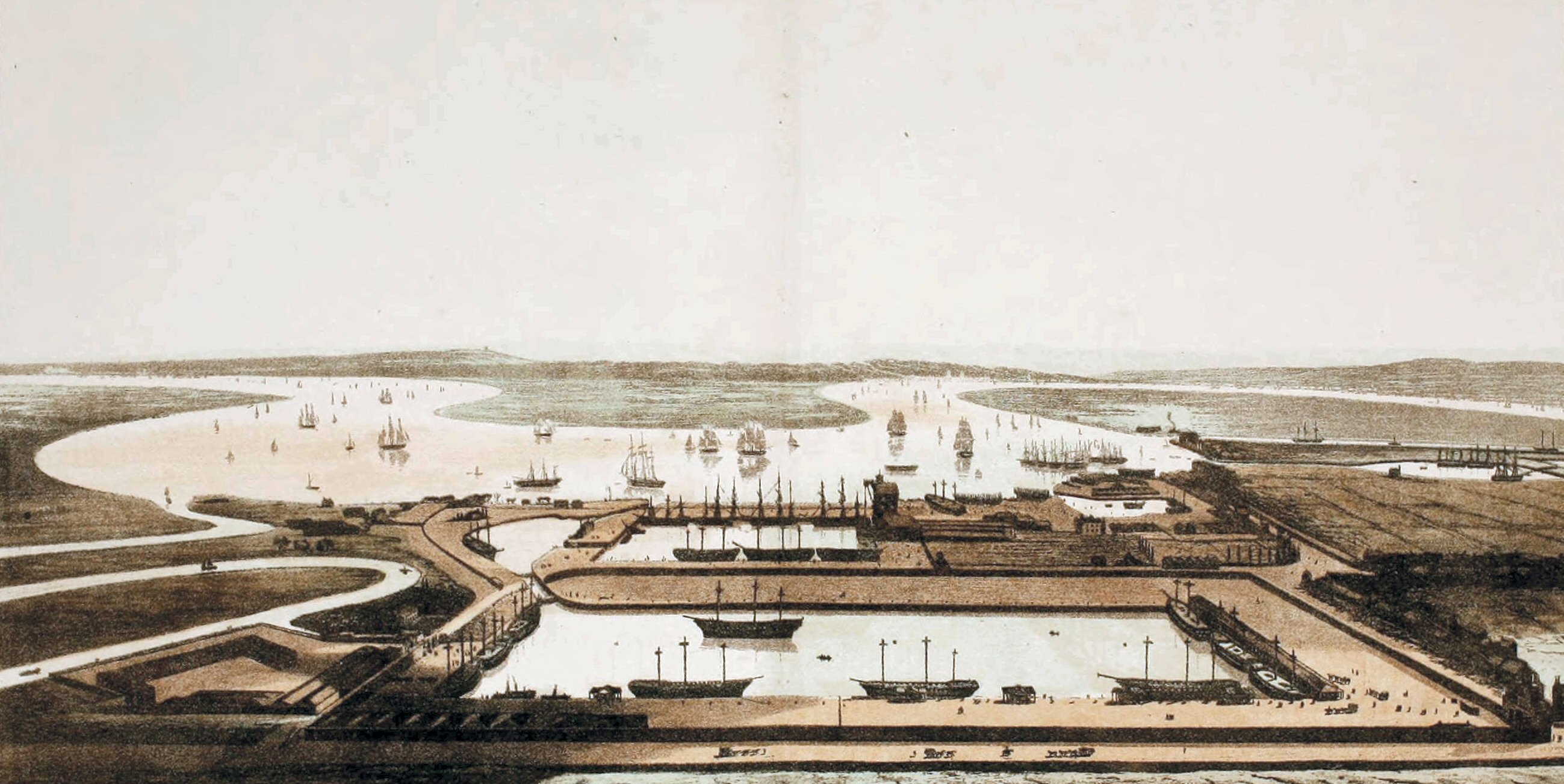
The East India Docks on the River Thomas, East London, in the year 1806; the year of their completion

Turner owned a sailmaking and canvas firm in Limehouse. He then in 1800 went into a local cordage business with Joseph Huddart, in partnership with Woolmore and Sir Robert Wigram, 1st Baronet. By 1809 he gave up government work for the Naval Board, as inspector of canvas, citing pressure of other business.

William Cotton joined Turner's counting-house at age 15, and in 1807 became a partner in Huddart & Co. His father Joseph Cotton was a business associate of Turner in the East India Dock Company, being chairman while Turner was deputy chairman. In 1814 Turner gave evidence to Parliament on the shipping of the East India Company. He chaired the trust that constructed the East India Dock Road, as an extension of Commercial Road, and was also a director of the Phoenix Fire Office.

James Walker in 1820 proposed a trial steam vessel voyage to Turner, from London to Edinburgh. It took place in June 1821 on the City of Edinburgh. After James Watt died in 1819, James Watt junior turned to friends to preserve his father's memory, among whom Turner was prominent. Turner went on to chair the committee of 1824 which financed Francis Chantrey's memorial to Watt. During Watt junior's campaign to assert his father's priority claim on the composition of water, Turner in 1839 acted as an intermediary with Robert Brown, to whom he gave some limited access to relevant correspondence (of Joseph Banks and Charles Blagden).

Turner was elected a member of the Geological Society in 1813, of the Linnean Society in 1819, and of the Royal Society in 1821. In 1823 he served as High Sheriff of Surrey. He was also a member of the Horticultural Society, the Royal Institution, and the Athenaeum Club, and a manager of the London Institution. In 1848 he became an honorary member of the Society of Civil Engineers. His portrait was painted by Martin Archer Shee.

He died at Rook's Nest, Godstone, Surrey on 17 March 1856 aged 83 and was buried at St Peter's, Tandridge, Surrey.

== House and garden ==
In 1817 Turner bought from Matthias Wilks "Rook's Nest", a house in 140 acres in Surrey. On the way from Tandridge to Godstone, it was described in 1873, when still in the Turner family, as a "stately semi-classical mansion with Ionic portico". In 1838 Thomas Streatfeild commented on the house's busts of James Watt and John Rennie the Elder, portrait of Huddart, and galleries.

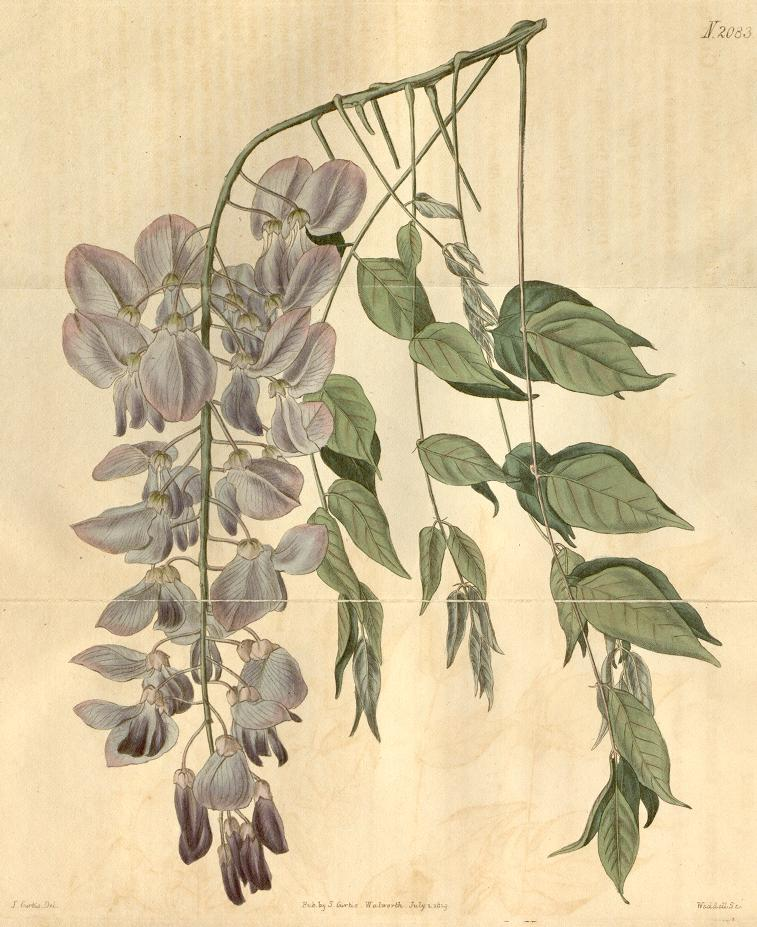
Wisteria sinensis, from Curtis's Botanical Magazine.

Captain Robert Welbank imported for Turner a variety of Camellia japonica, around 1810. It was through Turner's interest in gardening that the Chinese wisteria (Wisteria sinensis) was introduced to the United Kingdom. In May 1816 Welbank, as captain of the East Indiaman Cuffnells, brought a wisteria specimen to Turner as a gift. It may have been despatched by John Reeves, who was based in Guangzhou as a tea inspector for the East India Company; Reeves certainly sent another specimen in 1818, to Kew. It is known that Reeves had seen the plant in the garden of Consequa (his trading name: Pan Changyao 潘長耀), who was a leading hong merchant. The species came in fact from Zhangzhou in Fujian.

Another captain, Richard Rawes, brought wisteria from the same garden, arriving a matter of days later: this time destined for a rival gardener, Thomas Carey Palmer of Bromley. Turner initially kept the wisteria specimen in its pot. The Mechanics' Magazine in 1827 identified Turner as a pioneer in steam heating of conservatories, about eight years previously. In fact Turner subjected his wisteria to summer heat (84 °F) in a peach house, where red spider was a problem, and then relative cold in a shady greenhouse after his gardener had repotted it. The plant began to flower in March 1819.

Turner's success with wisteria was rewarded by a medal from the Horticultural Society, though his plant, in a pit, never thrived as the Society's one did. It is now regarded as a cultivar, and the name "Consequa" has been proposed. He had it propagated by the nurserymen Messrs. Loddiges; and switched to the water heating method of William Whale by the November 1827 issue of the Gardener's Magazine.

== Collections ==
Miniatures by Ozias Humphry, left by Humphry to William Upcott, came to Turner as a bequest from Upcott in 1845. He also collected the works of George Jones, a personal friend. In particular he accumulated the drawings of battles, and chalk and sepia sketches, that Jones made.

Turner borrowed letters of James Wolfe from the Warde family, around 1827, to help Robert Southey with a planned biography of Wolfe. They turned up 30 years later, in the estate of Dawson Turner.

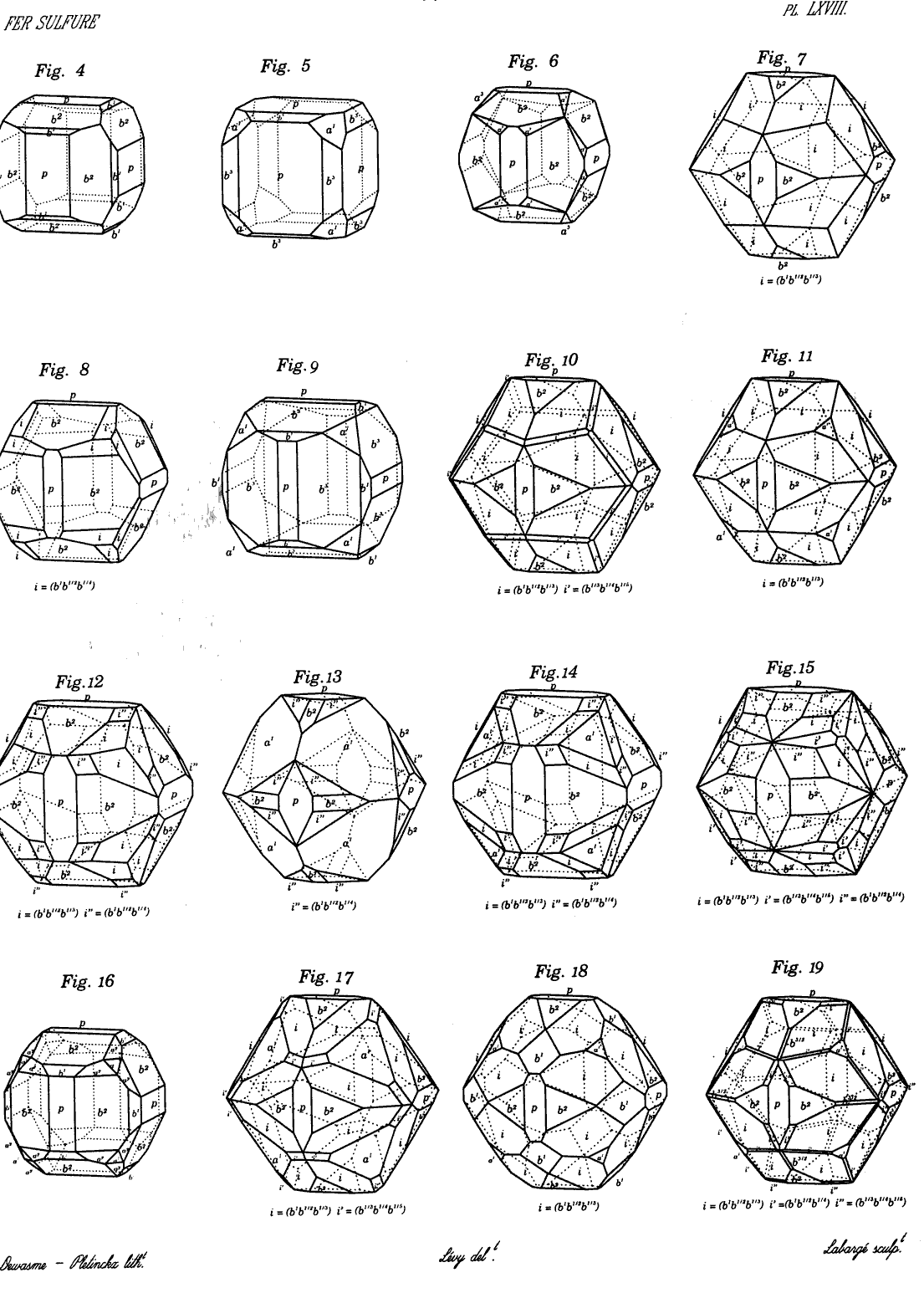
Plate from Description d'une collection de minéraux, formée par M. Henri Heuland, et appartenant a M. Ch. Hampden Turner, relating to iron pyrites

A noted mineral collection was owned by Turner, based on that of Henri Heuland. A catalogue was published in 1837, as Description d'une collection de minéraux, formée par M. Henri Heuland, et appartenant a M. Ch. Hampden Turner, by Armand Lévy (3 vols. and Atlas. London). According to the catalogue's introduction, the collection was founded by Jacob Forster. It was then built up by Heuland, in the period 1806 to 1820, when it was bought by Turner. Its later history saw the collection purchased by Henry Ludlam. It then went as part of a bequest to the Museum of Practical Geology. Humphry Davy wrote on a rock crystal he found in Turner's collection. As a compliment to Turner, Lévy named a rare mineral "turnerite", also called "pictite". Later, in 1866, James Dwight Dana identified this mineral as monazite.

== Family ==
Turner married Mary Rohde. Their only son was Charles Hampden, who graduated B.A. at Christ Church, Oxford in 1825, and married Henrietta-Fourness, daughter of Matthew Wilson of Eshton Hall. He died in 1842, leaving a son of the same name, known as a soldier, who died in 1867.

Their daughter Mary married Money Wigram (1790–1873). He was son of Sir Robert Wigram, Turner's business partner, by his second wife Eleanor. The second daughter Harriet in 1837 married Rev. Thomas Staniforth (1807–1887).
