= Armand Lévy (mineralogist) =

French mathematician and mineralogist

Serve-Dieu Abailard "Armand" Lévy (14 November 1795 – 29 July 1841) was a French mathematician and mineralogist. He is remembered for the Haüy-Lévy notation for describing mineral crystal structures.

== Life ==
Lévy was born in Paris where his Jewish businessman father had married Céline Mailfert, a Catholic. Although his birth and death records list his names as Serve-Dieu Abailard, he registered with the Geological Society of London under the name Armand. Armand Lévy studied mathematics and passed his agrégation in 1816 from the École Normale Supérieure. Due to his Jewish origin, he faced difficulties obtaining jobs in France and accepted a position at the Collège Royal on Reunion Island. However, while sailing to the Indian Ocean, his ship was wrecked off Plymouth. Subsequently, he settled in London, where he made a living by giving mathematics lessons. In 1820, he met mineral dealer Henry Heuland, who asked him to categorise his collection for sale to Charles Hampden Turner. During his time in London, Lévy interacted with Wollaston and became a member of the Geological Society of London in 1826. In 1827, He went to Belgium to supervise the printing of the Heuland mineral catalogue. He would later settle and become a professor at the University of Liège. After the 1830 revolution, he returned to France and taught mathematics at the École Normale Supérieure in Paris. Lévy worked on defining crystal structures based on parallelepipeds with truncations of the edges and vertices, using vowels for vertices and consonants for edges, with the bounded planes characterized by their slope. However, this system was later superseded by the Miller system.

Lévy married Harriet Drewet in 1822 in London. Following her death and move to Paris, he married Amélie, daughter of mathematician Olinde Rodriquez, in 1838. He died of an aneurysm in 1841.

== Legacy ==
Armand Lévy described many mineral species, such as babingtonite, beudantite, brochantite, brookite, forsterite, phillipsite, roselite and willemite. Lévyne was named after him.
