= William Fitzhugh (MP) =

Member of Parliament for Tiverton
- In office 8 July 1803 – June 1819

Personal details
- Born: 21 July 1757
- Died: 5 March 1842 (aged 84)
- Party: Tory
- Spouse: Charlotte (1767–1855)
- Relations: Anthony Hamilton (father-in-law)

William Fitzhugh (21 July 1757 – 5 March 1842) was an English politician. He was a Tory Member of Parliament from 1802 to 1819.

== See also ==
- List of MPs elected in the 1806 United Kingdom general election
- List of MPs elected in the 1802 United Kingdom general election
- List of MPs elected in the 1807 United Kingdom general election
- List of MPs elected in the 1812 United Kingdom general election
- List of MPs elected in the 1818 United Kingdom general election
