= William Jacob (MP, died 1851) =

William Jacob (c. 1761 – 17 December 1851) was an English merchant, shipowner, scientist, parliamentarian, public official and advocate for expanded British trade. In his later life he was a significant and effective advocate for the repeal of the Corn Laws.

== Early life ==
The early life of William Jacob is not known, though he seems to have received a good education, and a strong interest in statistics. He became a fellow of the Royal Society. Although it is sometimes assumed that the surname Jacob is Jewish, it is more likely that he was distantly related to the well known Somerset Jacob family from whence the Quakers and biscuit manufacturers came.

In February 1791 he married Martha Stuckey, daughter of the wealthy banking patriarch Samuel Stuckey of Langport, Somerset.

In the 1790s through to 1810 the firm of John and William Jacob traded from London variously as linen merchants and 'warehousemen'. In 1806 William Jacob was elected to the House of Commons as a Tory Member of Parliament (MP) for Westbury, with a subsequent election to Rye for the period 1808–11.

During 1806-7 Britain temporarily invaded the region of Rio de Plata, disrupting the Spanish control of its American colonies. At this time William Jacob was a key influencer in advocating Britain's attempt at invasion and overthrow of the weak Spanish control over its American empire. In encouraging this undertaking William Jacob introduced the act of Parliament that reduced the monopoly of the South Sea Company.

In anticipation of changes in South America the firm of J&W Jacob, of Newgate Street, London embarked upon an ambitious trade. In 1807 they sought investors for an expedition to the South Seas to trade contraband fabrics with the closed colonies of Spain's American empire. The Jacobs obtained sufficient investment for three ships to proceed to the Pacific coast, the ship's being the Hero, Pandour, and Memphis. These vessels were registered as whalers and he is listed as having a fourth whaling vessel, the Invention.

While each of the ships were commissioned with letter of marque their primary role was to trade British fabrics for silver, gold or copper ingots. The three vessels were captured off Lima and resulted in an insurance claim that saw Jacob charged with fraud. He spent six months in Spain and, by 1811, was bankrupt.

== Later life ==
He left London and took up residence at Chesham Lodge in Surrey where he became a farmer. He was later appointed comptroller of corn returns for the Board of Trade. He retired from that position in 1841 and died at his home, 31 Cadogen Place, Sloane Street, London, on 17 December 1851.

William Jacob outlived a son, the barrister and legal writer Edward Jacob (1795/6–1841),. An obituary in The Gentleman's Magazine gave William's age as 89. According to Joshua Wilson, Jacob had become by 1806, “a commercial man of considerable credit” and was “one of the few Englishmen who, in the present day had carried on a direct trade with South America.”

Parliament of the United Kingdom
Preceded by William Baldwin; Charles Smith	Member of Parliament for Westbury; 1806 – 1807; With: John Woolmore	Succeeded by Edward Lascelles; Glynn Wynn
Preceded by Sir William Elford; Stephen Rumbold Lushington	Member of Parliament for Rye; 1808 – 1812; With: Stephen Rumbold Lushington	Succeeded by Thomas Phillipps Lamb; Sir Henry Sullivan
