= Charles Smith (MP) =

British politician

Charles Smith (September 1756 – 9 May 1814) was a British politician. He sat in the House of Commons of Great Britain from 1796 until its abolition in 1800, and then in the House of Commons of the United Kingdom from 1801 to 1806.

He was the only son of Charles Smith of Stratford, Essex, who he succeeded in 1777.

He was elected at a by-election in November 1796 as one of the two Members of Parliament (MP) for the borough of Saltash in Cornwall, and held the seat until 1802. He was elected at the general election in 1802 as one of the two MPs for the borough of Westbury in Wiltshire, and held that seat until the 1806 general election. He was appointed High Sheriff of Essex for 1811–12.

He married twice: firstly Susanna, the daughter of John Devall of Marylebone, Middlesex and secondly Augusta, the daughter and coheiress of Joshua Smith of Erlestoke Park, Devizes, Wiltshire, with whom he had 3 sons and 6 daughters.

Parliament of Great Britain
Preceded by Edward Bearcroft; The Lord Macdonald	Member of Parliament for Saltash; 1796 – 1800; With: The Lord Macdonald	Succeeded by Parliament of the United Kingdom
Parliament of the United Kingdom
Preceded by Parliament of Great Britain	Member of Parliament for Saltash; 1801 – 1802; With: The Lord Macdonald	Succeeded by Matthew Russell; Robert Deverell
Preceded by Sir Henry St John-Mildmay, Bt; John Simon Harcourt	Member of Parliament for Westbury; 1802 – 1806; With: William Baldwin	Succeeded by William Jacob; John Woolmore
