= Earl Talbot (1778 EIC ship) =

History

British East India Company
- Name: Earl Talbot
- Namesake: Earl Talbot
- Owner: EIC voyages #1-4: Sir Charles Raymond, Bt.; EIC voyages #5-6:Donald Cameron
- Builder: Perry, Blackwall
- Launched: 10 August 1778
- Fate: Sold for breaking up in 1793

General characteristics
- Tons burthen: 758, or 767 (bm)
- Propulsion: Sail
- Complement: 90
- Armament: 12 × 9&4-pounder guns + 6 swivel guns

Earl Talbot was launched as an East Indiaman in 1778. She made six voyages for the British East India Company (EIC) between 1779 and 1793. She was sold for breaking up in 1793.

== Career ==
EIC voyage #1 (1779-1781): Captain Thomas Hindman sailed from Portsmouth on 7 March 1779, bound for St Helena, Bengal, and Madras. Earl Talbot reached Madeira on 12 April and St Helena on 30 July, before arriving at Kedgeree on 5 December. Homeward bound she was at Madras on 25 December, Madagascar on 16 June 1780, and the Cape of Good Hope on 25 August. She reached St Helena on 29 October and Crookhaven on 9 January 1781; she arrived at Long Reach on 24 February.

EIC voyage #2 (1782-1784): Captain Robert Taylor sailed from Portsmouth on 6 February 1782, bound for Bombay, Madras, and Bengal. Earl Talbot reached Rio de Janeiro on 29 August/April and Bombay on 7 September. She reached Madras on 19 October and Masulipatam on 27 November. She was again at Madras on 27 January 1783, and at Mangalore on 6 March. On 9 March 1783 Earl Talbot participated in the capture of Mangalore fort from French during the Second Anglo-Mysore War. From Mangalore Earl Talbot returned to Bombay on 25 April, then Madras on 12 August, and Masulipatam on 2 September. She arrived at Kedgeree on 6 October. Homeward bound, she reached St Helena on 1 June 1784 and arrived at the Downs on 28 August.

EIC voyage #3 (1785-1787): Captain Taylor sailed from Portsmouth on 16 October 1785, bound for Madras and Bengal. Earl Talbot was at Madeira on 29 October and the Cape of Good Hopeon 9 January 1786. She reached Madras on 6 April and arrived at Diamond Creek on 27 April. Homeward bound, she was at Saugor on 27 December, Madras on 4 February 1787, and the Cape on 23 April. She reached St Helena on 27 May and arrived at the Downs on 18 July.

EIC voyage #4 (1788-1789): Captain John Woolmore sailed from the Downs on 4 April 1788, bound for China. She arrived at Whampoa on 9 August. Homeward bound, she crossed the Second Bar on 26 November, reached St Helena on 21 February 1789, and arrived at Gravesend on 27 April.

EIC voyage #5 (1790-1791): Captain Woolmore sailed from the Downs on 13 May 1790, bound for China. Earl Talbot arrived at Whampoa on 29 September. Homeward bound, she crossed the Second Bar on 15 January 1791, reached St Helena on 6 July, and arrived at Long Reach on 31 August.

EIC voyage #6 (1792-1793): Captain Jeremiah Dawkins sailed from the Downs on 2 June 1792, bound for Bengal. Not long after Earl Talbot sprang a leak due to a gale and had to put into Santiago on 24 June. She left 10 days later. She arrived on 7 November at Diamond Point. Homeward bound, she was at Saugor on 18 February, and reached St Helena on 1 July. Dawkins was issued a letter of marque on 20 August, i.e., while Earl Talbot was sailing between St Helena and Long Reach, where she arrived on 3 October. After this voyage Dawkins went on to captain a second Earl Talbot but died on her on 10 July 1797.

== Fate ==
Earl Talbot was sold in 1793 for breaking up.
