= John Woolmore =

English mariner

Sir John Woolmore KCH FRS (1755 – 2 December 1837) was an English mariner. He served as chairman of the East India Dock Company, and was deputy master of Trinity House. He was also (briefly) a member of parliament.

== Mariner ==
Woolmore was born in Whitechapel. Little is known of his life before he went to India in 1768, aged 12, aboard the East India Company ship, the Granby, returning to England in 1770. He joined the Marine Service of the East India Company, and was a midshipman on the company's ships Duke of Richmond and Stormont, and then second mate on Earl of Chesterfield. He served as second mate on Harcourt, trading to America from 1774 to 1777, with a brother as third mate. He married his first wife, Margaret Wickham née Mason, in December 1778.

He was third mate on the East India Company ship Earl Talbot from 1779 to 1781, and was then second mate on Earl of Chesterfield from 1781.

== Shipowner ==
Woolmore remained in India in 1782 to become the captain of a "country ship", a privately owned merchant vessel, and then became part-owner and commander of a ship trading between India, Malaya, and China. He made two voyages between England and China as captain of Earl Talbot from 1788 to 1791.

His first wife died in December 1788, and Woolmore married his second wife in January 1790. Harriet Turner was the daughter of John Turner, and sister of Charles Hampden Turner.

Woolmore went on to own or part-own seven merchant vessels trading in the East Indies – Earl of Wycombe, Earl Howe, Admiral Gardner, Lord Duncan, Sir William Bensley, Harriett and Huddart. He was a partner of Sir Robert Wigram, 1st Baronet. He also became a partner with his brother-in-law Charles Hampden-Turner and Joseph Huddart in a business producing rope and cordage. He had given up his commercial interests in East India shipping and his stock in the East India Company before 1813.

== East India Dock Company and Trinity House ==
Woolmore was deputy chairman of the East India Dock Company from 1803 to 1819, 1822 to 1824, and 1827 to 1892, and acting chairman in 1826–7, 1830–1 and 1834–5. Roads near the docks are named after individuals connected with the company, and Woolmore Street in Poplar is named after him. He became an elder of Trinity House in 1803, and was deputy master of Trinity House from 1825 to 1834. He was a director of the Royal Exchange Assurance Corporation from 1811, and became a Fellow of the Royal Society in 1830.

== MP ==
With William Jacob, he served as one of two Members of Parliament for Westbury, Wiltshire, from 1806 to 1807, having purchased the seat from the trustees of Montagu Bertie, 5th Earl of Abingdon. He stood unsuccessfully for St Ives in the 1807 general election.

== Later life ==
He was a friend of William IV, and became a knight bachelor in March 1834 and a Knight Commander of the Royal Guelphic Order (KCH) later in 1834.

He died in London on 2 December 1837 and was buried at St. George the Martyr Cemetery, Brunswick Square, renamed St George's Gardens. He left most of his property to his wife Harriet (1762 - 1845) and her brother. No children are known. He is said to have been one of the last men in London society to wear a pigtail.

Parliament of the United Kingdom
Preceded by William Baldwin; Charles Smith	Member of Parliament for Westbury; 1806 – 1807; With: William Jacob	Succeeded by Edward Lascelles; Glynn Wynn
