= Robert Morris (MP) =

English politician

Robert Morris (died 1816), of Barnwood Court, near Gloucester, was an English politician.

He was a Member (MP) for Gloucester 7 August 1805 to 6 September 1816.
