= Patrick Craufurd Bruce =

Patrick Craufurd Bruce (24 January 1748 – 30 March 1820) was an East India Company merchant and Member of Parliament in the early 19th century. He represented three constituencies: Evesham, Rye and Dundalk.

== Life ==
In 1768, Bruce joined the service of the East India Company as a Writer in the Bombay Presidency, eventually returning to Britain in the mid-1790s. He planted vast forests in Berkshire, Dorset, Gloucestershire, Oxfordshire and Hampshire. Bruce's Wood was planted around the estuary of the River Bourne, which later became Bournemouth.

== Family ==
Bruce was the fifth son of Sir Michael Bruce of Stenhouse and Mary Bruce (nee. Agnew). In 1785, he married Jane Smith, daughter of the Lancashire industrialist Edmund Smith.

His son Michael Bruce was also an MP, and was known by contemporaries for his connection to Lady Hester Stanhope.

== See also ==
- Bruce baronets
