= List of United Kingdom by-elections (1801–1806) =

This is a list of parliamentary by-elections in the United Kingdom held between 1801 and 1806, with the names of the previous incumbent and the victor in the by-election.

In the absence of a comprehensive and reliable source for party and factional alignments in this period, no attempt is made to define them in this article. The House of Commons: 1790–1820 provides some guidance to the complex and shifting political relationships, but it is significant that the compilers of that work make no attempt to produce a definitive list of each member's allegiances.

== Resignations ==
Where the cause of by-election is given as "resigned", this indicates that the incumbent was appointed on his own request to an "office of profit under the Crown". Offices used, in this period, were the Stewards of the Chiltern Hundreds or the Manor of East Hendred and the Escheators of Munster or Ulster. These appointments are made as a constitutional device for leaving the House of Commons, whose Members are not permitted to resign.

== By-elections ==
The c/u column denotes whether the by-election was a contested poll or an unopposed return. If the winner was re-elected, at the next general election and any intermediate by-elections, this is indicated by an * following the c or u. In a few cases the winner was elected at the next general election but had not been re-elected in a by-election after the one noted. In those cases no * symbol is used.

An incumbent who vacated a seat in the Irish Parliament, before the United Kingdom of Great Britain and Ireland came into existence on 1 January 1801, has (IP) following their name. In two cases two member seats in the Parliament of Ireland were reduced to single member constituencies in the United Kingdom Parliament, with both old seats being vacant at the start of the union and a by-election having to be held to fill the vacancy for the new seat.

Where a seat was vacated, because the incumbent member inherited a peerage or was created a peer or was appointed to an office, click the highlighted cause for further details of the particular circumstances. If the by-election date is highlighted, this is a link to an article about the by-election.

=== 1st Parliament (1801–1802) ===
Date	Constituency	c/u	Former Incumbent	Winner	Cause
14 January 1801	Londonderry County	u	Earl of Tyrone (IP)	Sir George Hill, Bt	peerage
19 January 1801	Wicklow	c	Nicholas Westby (IP)	George Ponsonby	died
9 February 1801	Cambridge	u*	Robert Manners	Robert Manners	appointed
12 February 1801	Wilton	u*	Philip Goldsworthy	John Spencer	died
13 February 1801	Clonmel	u*	Stephen Moore (IP); John Dennis (IP)	William Bagwell	resigned
14 February 1801	Old Sarum	u	Sir George Yonge, Bt	John Horne Tooke	resigned
16 February 1801	Stamford	u*	The Earl of Carysfort	Albemarle Bertie	peerage
20 February 1801	Kinsale	u	William Rowley	William Rowley	appointed
20 February 1801	Wexford	u	Francis Leigh	Ponsonby Tottenham	resigned
21 February 1801	Northampton	u*	Spencer Perceval	Spencer Perceval	appointed
25 February 1801	Bramber	u	James Adams	James Adams	appointed
25 February 1801	Corfe Castle	u*	John Bond	Nathaniel Bond	resigned
25 February 1801	Devizes	u*	Henry Addington	Henry Addington	resigned
25 February 1801	Newtown	u	Sir Richard Worsley	Sir Edward Law	resigned
25 February 1801	Rye	u*	Lord Hawkesbury	Lord Hawkesbury	appointed
25 February 1801	Weymouth & Melcombe Regis	u*	William Garthshore	William Garthshore	appointed
27 February 1801	Totnes	u	The Lord Arden	The Lord Arden	appointed
28 February 1801	Dundalk	u	John Jocelyn (IP); John Stratton (IP)	Isaac Corry	resigned
2 March 1801	Armagh City	u*	Patrick Duigenan	Patrick Duigenan	appointed
2 March 1801	Kilkenny City	u	William Talbot	Richard Archdall	resigned
3 March 1801	Cambridgeshire	u*	Charles Philip Yorke	Charles Philip Yorke	appointed
4 March 1801	Rye	u	Robert Saunders-Dundas	The Lord de Blaquiere	resigned
5 March 1801	Kerry	u*	Maurice FitzGerald	Maurice FitzGerald	appointed
5 March 1801	Portarlington	u	Frederick Trench	William Elliot	peerage
6 March 1801	Oxfordshire	u*	Lord Charles Spencer	Lord Francis Almeric Spencer	appointed
10 March 1801	Banffshire	u*	Sir William Grant	Sir William Grant	resigned
10 March 1801	Galway Borough	u	St. George Daly	John Brabazon Ponsonby	appointed
21 March 1801	Carlow	u	Henry Sadleir Prittie	Francis Aldborough Prittie	peerage
21 March 1801	Devizes	u*	Henry Addington	Henry Addington	appointed
23 March 1801	Corfe Castle	u*	Nathaniel Bond	Nathaniel Bond	appointed
23 March 1801	Oxford University	u*	Francis Page	Sir William Scott	resigned
24 March 1801	Weobley	u*	Lord George Thynne	Lord George Thynne	appointed
25 March 1801	Downton	u	Sir William Scott	Viscount Folkestone	resigned
4 April 1801	Poole	u*	Charles Stuart	George Garland	died
9 April 1801	Callington	u*	Sir John Call	John Inglett-Fortescue	died
10 May 1801	Downpatrick	u	Clotworthy Rowley	Samuel Campbell Rowley	appointed
12 May 1801	Poole	u*	George Garland	George Garland	resigned
22 May 1801	Helston	u	Charles Abbot	Charles Abbot	appointed
30 May 1801	Weymouth & Melcombe Regis	u*	Andrew Stuart	Charles Adams	died
1 June 1801	Bath	c*	Sir Richard Pepper Arden	John Palmer	peerage
1 June 1801	Edinburghshire or Midlothian	u*	Robert Dundas	Robert Saunders-Dundas	appointed
9 June 1801	Lymington	u	Sir Harry Neale	Sir Harry Neale	appointed
15 June 1801	Banffshire	u*	Sir William Grant	Sir William Grant	appointed
6 July 1801	Plympton Erle	u	William Adams	The Lord Glenbervie	resigned
6 July 1801	Totnes	u*	Lord George Seymour	William Adams	resigned
16 July 1801	Sussex	u*	Thomas Pelham	John Fuller	peerage
30 July 1801	Carlow	u*	Francis Aldborough Prittie	Charles Montagu Ormsby	resigned
7 November 1801	Thirsk	u*	Sir Thomas Frankland	William Frankland	resigned
12 November 1801	Portsmouth	u*	Lord Hugh Seymour	John Markham	died
13 November 1801	Higham Ferrers	u*	Stephen Thurston Adey	Francis Ferrand Foljambe	died
19 November 1801	Nottinghamshire	u*	Evelyn Henry Frederick Pierrepont	Charles Herbert Pierrepont	died
21 November 1801	Dungannon	u	John Knox	Sir Charles Hamilton	died
23 November 1801	Bristol	u*	Charles Bragge	Charles Bragge	appointed
1 December 1801	Monaghan	u*	Warner William Westenra	Charles Powell Leslie II	peerage
9 December 1801	Cashel	u	Richard Bagwell	John Bagwell	resigned
28 December 1801	Queen's County	u*	Sir John Parnell	William Wellesley-Pole	died
5 January 1802	Aberdeen Burghs	u*	Alexander Allardyce	James Farquhar	died
8 January 1802	Cork City	u*	John Hely-Hutchinson	Christopher Hely-Hutchinson	peerage
12 January 1802	Haverfordwest	u*	The 1st Lord Kensington	The 2nd Lord Kensington	died
13 January 1802	Stirlingshire	u*	The Lord Keith	Charles Elphinstone Fleeming	peerage
22 February 1802	Heytesbury	u	The Viscount Clifden	William Wickham	peerage
26 February 1802	East Looe	u	Sir John Mitford	James Buller	peerage
1 March 1802	Tyrone	u*	Viscount Corry	John Stewart	peerage
10 March 1802	Haddington Burghs	u*	Robert Baird	Thomas Maitland	resigned
25 March 1802	Tavistock	u*	Lord John Russell	Lord Robert Spencer	peerage
29 March 1802	Petersfield	u*	William Jolliffe	Hylton Jolliffe	died
5 April 1802	Queen's County	u	Charles Henry Coote	Henry Brooke Parnell	peerage
19 April 1802	Northampton	u*	Spencer Perceval	Spencer Perceval	appointed
5 May 1802	Cambridgeshire	c	James Whorwood Adeane	Sir Henry Peyton	died
5 May 1802	Newtown	u	Sir Edward Law	Ewan Law	appointed
8 May 1802	Newark	u*	Thomas Manners-Sutton	Thomas Manners-Sutton	appointed

=== 2nd Parliament (1802–1806) ===
Date	Constituency	c/u	Former Incumbent	Winner	Cause
14 December 1802	Brackley	u*	Samuel Haynes	Robert Haldane Bradshaw	resigned
14 December 1802	Great Marlow	u*	Thomas Williams	Pascoe Grenfell	died
14 December 1802	Heytesbury	u	Charles Abbot	Charles Moore	sat elsewhere
15 December 1802	Chester	u*	Viscount Belgrave	Richard Erle-Drax-Grosvenor	peerage
16 December 1802	Fowey	u	Edward Golding	Robert Wigram	sat elsewhere
16 December 1802	Lymington	u*	Harry Burrard	John Kingston	resigned
17 December 1802	Bodmin	u	Charles Shaw-Lefevre	John Sargent	sat elsewhere
18 December 1802	Wootton Bassett	u	Henry St John	Peter William Baker	resigned
24 December 1802	Enniskillen	u	John Beresford	William Burroughs	sat elsewhere
24 December 1802	Midhurst	c	Samuel Smith	Edmund Turnor	sat elsewhere
30 December 1802	Portarlington	u	Henry Brooke Parnell	Thomas Tyrwhitt	resigned
4 January 1803	Edinburgh	u	Henry Dundas	Charles Hope	peerage
4 January 1803	Harwich	u*	John Robinson	John Hiley Addington	died
12 January 1803	Bossiney	u	John Hiley Addington	George Peter Holford	resigned
24 January 1803	Dumfries Burghs	u	Charles Hope	Viscount Stopford	resigned
24 January 1803	Gatton	c	James Dashwood	Philip Dundas	resigned
8 February 1803	Ipswich	u	Charles Alexander Crickitt	William Middleton	died
11 February 1803	Hastings	u	The Lord Glenbervie	The Lord Glenbervie	appointed
15 February 1803	Steyning	u	Robert Hurst	Lord Ossulston	sat elsewhere
25 February 1803	Yarmouth (I.o.W)	u	James Patrick Murray	Charles MacDonnell	resigned
29 March 1803	Brackley	u*	John William Egerton	Anthony Henderson	peerage
30 March 1803	Coventry	c*	Nathaniel Jefferys	Peter Moore	void election
31 March 1803	Herefordshire	u	John Geers Cotterell	John Matthews	void election
5 April 1803	Ayrshire	u*	William Fullarton	Sir Hew Dalrymple-Hamilton	appointed
5 April 1803	Ilchester	c	William Hunter	Charles Brooke	void election
5 April 1803	Ilchester	c	Thomas Plummer	Sir William Manners	void election
19 April 1803	Berwick-upon-Tweed	c	Thomas Hall	Francis Sitwell	void election
19 April 1803	Berwick-upon-Tweed	c	John Fordyce	Alexander Allan	void election
9 May 1803	Nottinghamshire	u*	Lord William Cavendish-Bentinck	Anthony Hardolph Eyre	appointed
17 May 1803	Boston	c	Thomas Fydell (senior)	Thomas Fydell (junior)	void election
19 May 1803	Callington	u	John Inglett-Fortescue	Ambrose St John	resigned
30 May 1803	Nottingham	c*	Joseph Birch	Daniel Parker Coke	void election
9 June 1803	Dungannon	u	George Knox	Sir Charles Hamilton	sat elsewhere
17 June 1803	Fermanagh	u*	Viscount Cole	Galbraith Lowry Cole	peerage
18 June 1803	Downton	u	Edward Bouverie	The Lord de Blaquiere	resigned
20 June 1803	Newport (Cornwall)	u*	Joseph Richardson	Edward Morris	died
29 June 1803	Southwark	c	George Tierney	George Tierney	appointed
8 July 1803	Tiverton	u*	Dudley Ryder	William Fitzhugh	peerage
18 July 1803	Great Grimsby	u*	Ayscoghe Boucherett	Charles Anderson-Pelham	resigned
18 July 1803	Worcestershire	u	Edward Foley	John William Ward	died
29 July 1803	Wigtown Burghs	u	John Spalding	William Stewart	resigned
13 August 1803	Downton	u	John William Ward	Viscount Marsham	resigned
15 August 1803	Bury St Edmunds	u*	Lord Hervey	The Lord Templetown	peerage
16 August 1803	Bristol	u*	Charles Bragge	Charles Bragge	resigned
19 August 1803	Whitchurch	u*	William Brodrick	William Brodrick	appointed
22 August 1803	Athlone	u	William Handcock	Thomas Jones	resigned
22 August 1803	Cambridgeshire	u*	Charles Philip Yorke	Charles Philip Yorke	resigned
23 August 1803	Kinross-shire	u	William Douglas MacLean-Clephane	David Clephane	appointed
10 September 1803	Haddington Burghs	u	Thomas Maitland	Thomas Maitland	appointed
1 October 1803	Yarmouth (I.o.W)	u	Charles MacDonnell	Henry Swann	died
14 November 1803	Gloucestershire	u*	Marquess of Worcester	Lord Robert Edward Henry Somerset	peerage
2 December 1803	Rye	u	Viscount Hawkesbury	Sir Charles Talbot	peerage
3 December 1803	Plympton Erle	c	Edward Golding	Edward Golding	appointed
21 December 1803	West Looe	u	Thomas Smith	Quintin Dick	resigned
26 December 1803	Inverness Burghs	u	Alexander Penrose Cumming-Gordon	George Cumming	resigned
27 December 1803	Carmarthen	u	John George Philipps	William Paxton	resigned
30 December 1803	Dorchester	u*	Cropley Ashley	Cropley Ashley	appointed
8 February 1804	Truro	u*	John Lemon	John Lemon	appointed
8 February 1804	Wallingford	c	Sir Francis Sykes	George Galway Mills	died
17 February 1804	Bridport	u*	Sir Evan Nepean	Sir Evan Nepean	appointed
22 February 1804	Windsor	c	John Williams	Arthur Vansittart	void election
27 February 1804	Bramber	u	George Manners-Sutton	Richard Norman	died
27 February 1804	Yarmouth (I.o.W)	u	Henry Swann	John Delgarno	resigned
5 March 1804	Durham City	c	Richard Wharton	Robert Eden Duncombe Shafto	void election
9 March 1804	Liskeard	c	John Eliot	double return – decided 16 May 1804	peerage
9 March 1804	Liskeard	c	John Eliot	William Huskisson	peerage
16 March 1804	Ilchester	c	Sir William Manners	John Manners	void election
17 March 1804	Preston	u*	John Horrocks	Samuel Horrocks	died
21 March 1804	Yarmouth (I.o.W)	u	John Delgarno	Sir Home Riggs Popham	resigned
31 March 1804	Dublin City	u*	John Claudius Beresford	Robert Shaw	resigned
9 April 1804	Knaresborough	u	James Hare	William Cavendish	died
27 April 1804	Okehampton	u	James Charles Stuart Strange	Viscount Althorp	resigned
7 May 1804	Ludgershall	u*	Earl of Dalkeith	Magens Dorrien Magens	resigned
17 May 1804	Cambridge University	u	William Pitt	William Pitt	appointed
19 May 1804	Wendover	u	Charles Long	Charles Long	appointed
22 May 1804	Bere Alston	u*	Lord Lovaine	Lord Lovaine	appointed
22 May 1804	Weobley	u*	Lord George Thynne	Lord George Thynne	appointed
24 May 1804	Wilton	u*	John Spencer	Ralph Sheldon	appointed
26 May 1804	Christchurch	u*	George Rose	George Rose	appointed
26 May 1804	Helston	u	Viscount FitzHarris	Davies Giddy	appointed
26 May 1804	Lostwithiel	u*	William Dickinson	William Dickinson	appointed
4 June 1804	County Galway	u	Viscount Dunlo	Viscount Dunlo	appointed
4 June 1804	Sutherland	u*	William Dundas	William Dundas	appointed
4 June 1804	Tralee	u	George Canning	George Canning	appointed
12 June 1804	Milborne Port	u	Lord Paget	Charles Paget	resigned
26 June 1804	Bridgwater	u	Jefferys Allen	John Hudleston	appointed
5 July 1804	Monmouth Boroughs	u*	Lord Charles Henry Somerset	Lord Charles Henry Somerset	appointed
16 July 1804	Aylesbury	c	Robert Bent	William Cavendish	void election
19 July 1804	Buckingham	u*	Thomas Grenville	Thomas Grenville	resigned
20 July 1804	Bath	u*	Lord John Thynne	Lord John Thynne	appointed
23 July 1804	Middlesex	c	Sir Francis Burdett	George Boulton Mainwaring	void 9 Jul 1804
23 July 1804	Middlesex	c	Sir Francis Burdett	Sir Francis Burdett	void 5 Mar 1805
23 July 1804	Middlesex	c	Sir Francis Burdett	George Boulton Mainwaring	void 10 Feb 1806
28 July 1804	Tain Burghs	u	John Charles Villiers	John Charles Villiers	appointed
30 July 1804	Knaresborough	–	William Cavendish	no return made due to riot	resigned
4 August 1804	Barnstaple	u*	Sir Edward Pellew	Viscount Ebrington	resigned
4 August 1804	Christchurch	u*	George Rose	George Rose	appointed
4 August 1804	Tiverton	u*	Richard Ryder	Richard Ryder	appointed
6 August 1804	Louth County	u*	John Foster	John Foster	appointed
14 August 1804	Bridport	u*	Sir Evan Nepean	Sir Evan Nepean	appointed
20 August 1804	Tregony	u	Marquess of Blandford	George Woodford Thellusson	appointed
1 October 1804	Warwickshire	u*	Sir George Shuckburgh-Evelyn	Charles Mordaunt	died
10 October 1804	Horsham	u	Patrick Ross	Viscount FitzHarris	died
8 November 1804	Dumfriesshire	u*	Sir Robert Laurie	William Johnstone Hope	died
14 December 1804	Totnes	u	John Berkeley Burland	Vicary Gibbs	died
23 January 1805	Buckingham	u	William, Lord Proby	John, Lord Proby	died
23 January 1805	Devizes	u*	Henry Addington	Thomas Grimston Estcourt	peerage
23 January 1805	West Looe	u*	James Buller	Ralph Allen Daniell	resigned
28 January 1805	Edinburgh	u	Charles Hope	George Abercromby	appointed
30 January 1805	Droitwich	u*	Sir Edward Winnington	Thomas Foley	died
31 January 1805	Amersham	u*	Charles Drake Garrard	Thomas Tyrwhitt-Drake	resigned
31 January 1805	Rutland	u*	The Lord Carbery	The Lord Henniker	died
4 February 1805	Peeblesshire	u*	Sir James Montgomery	Sir James Montgomery	appointed
5 February 1805	Leitrim	u*	Viscount Clements	Henry John Clements	peerage
6 February 1805	Thirsk	u	Sir Gregory Page-Turner	Richard Griffin	died
8 February 1805	Newark	u*	Sir Thomas Manners-Sutton	Henry Willoughby	appointed
8 February 1805	Totnes	u	Vicary Gibbs	Vicary Gibbs	appointed
11 February 1805	Hertfordshire	c*	Peniston Lamb	William Baker	died
11 February 1805	Mitchell	u	Robert Dallas	Earl of Dalkeith	appointed
14 February 1805	Haddington Burghs	u	Thomas Maitland	John Dalrymple	appointed
27 February 1805	Calne	u*	Joseph Jekyll	Joseph Jekyll	appointed
4 March 1805	Dysart Burghs	u	Sir James St Clair-Erskine	Robert Dallas	peerage
13 March 1805	Honiton	c*	George Shum	Augustus Cavendish-Bradshaw	died
25 March 1805	Knaresborough	c	William Cavendish	Viscount Duncannon	resigned
28 March 1805	Dublin University	c*	George Knox	George Knox	appointed
29 March 1805	Bath	u*	Lord John Thynne	Lord John Thynne	Voted before taking the Oath
1 April 1805	Old Sarum	u*	Nicholas Vansittart	Nicholas Vansittart	appointed
6 April 1805	King's County	u*	Sir Lawrence Parsons	Sir Lawrence Parsons	appointed
15 April 1805	Wigtownshire	u*	Andrew McDouall	William Maxwell	resigned
22 April 1805	Gatton	u	Philip Dundas	William Garrow	resigned
23 April 1805	Malton	u	Charles Lawrence Dundas	Henry Grattan	resigned
1 May 1805	Hereford	u*	John Scudamore	Richard Philip Scudamore	died
8 May 1805	Bletchingley	u	James Milnes	Nicholas Ridley-Colborne	died
10 May 1805	Helston	u	John Penn	Viscount Primrose	resigned
17 May 1805	Coventry	c*	Francis William Barlow	William Mills	died
5 June 1805	Newtown (I.o.W)	u	Charles Chapman	James Paull	resigned
8 June 1805	County Galway	u*	Viscount Dunlo	Denis Bowes Daly	peerage
10 June 1805	Shrewsbury	u	Sir William Pulteney	John Hill	died
24 June 1805	Forfarshire	u*	Sir David Carnegie	William Maule	died
26 June 1805	Tain Burghs	u	John Charles Villiers	James Macdonald	resigned
29 June 1805	Galway Borough	u*	Denis Bowes Daly	James Daly	resigned
22 July 1805	Cockermouth	u	James Graham	Viscount Garlies	resigned
26 July 1805	New Ross	u	Charles Tottenham	Ponsonby Tottenham	resigned
27 July 1805	Down	c*	Viscount Castlereagh	John Meade	appointed
7 August 1805	Gloucester	c*	John Pitt	Robert Morris	died
9 August 1805	Wigtown Burghs	u	William Stewart	James Graham	resigned
8 November 1805	Monmouthshire	u*	James Rooke	Lord Arthur John Henry Somerset	died
27 November 1805	Perth Burghs	c*	David Scott	Sir David Wedderburn	died
6 January 1806	County Waterford	u*	John Beresford	John Claudius Beresford	died
18 January 1806	Boroughbridge	u	John Scott	Viscount Castlereagh	died
27 January 1806	Dunwich	u*	Snowdon Barne	Snowdon Barne	appointed
29 January 1806	Yarmouth (I.o.W)	u	Sir Home Riggs Popham	David Scott	resigned
31 January 1806	Leominster	u	Charles Kinnaird	William Lamb	peerage
5 February 1806	Bedfordshire	u*	St Andrew St John	Francis Pym	peerage
7 February 1806	Cambridge University	c*	William Pitt	Lord Henry Petty	died
8 February 1806	Wendover	u	Charles Long	Charles Long	appointed
13 February 1806	Westminster	u	Charles James Fox	Charles James Fox	appointed
15 February 1806	Morpeth	u	Viscount Morpeth	Viscount Morpeth	appointed
15 February 1806	Okehampton	u	Viscount Althorp	Viscount Althorp	appointed
17 February 1806	Calne	u*	Lord Henry Petty	Osborne Markham	appointed
17 February 1806	Harwich	u*	John Hiley Addington	John Hiley Addington	appointed
17 February 1806	Newark	u	Sir Charles Morice Pole	Sir Charles Morice Pole	appointed
17 February 1806	Queen's County	u*	Sir Eyre Coote	Henry Brooke Parnell	appointed
17 February 1806	Reigate	u	John Somers Cocks	Philip James Cocks	peerage
17 February 1806	Tavistock	u*	Lord Robert Spencer	Lord Robert Spencer	resigned
17 February 1806	Tavistock	u*	Richard Fitzpatrick	Richard Fitzpatrick	appointed
18 February 1806	Buckinghamshire	u*	Earl Temple	Earl Temple	appointed
19 February 1806	Portsmouth	u	Thomas Erskine	David Montague Erskine	Appointed Lord Chancellor
19 February 1806	Portsmouth	u*	John Markham	John Markham	appointed
19 February 1806	St Mawes	u	William Windham	William Windham	appointed
20 February 1806	Suffolk	u*	Viscount Brome	Thomas Sherlock Gooch	peerage
20 February 1806	Wareham	u	John Calcraft	John Calcraft	appointed
21 February 1806	Northumberland	u*	Charles Grey	Charles Grey	appointed
21 February 1806	Steyning	u	Lord Ossulston	Lord Ossulston	appointed
21 February 1806	Steyning	u	James Martin Lloyd	Sir Arthur Leary Piggott	resigned
22 February 1806	Dunbartonshire	u	Sir James Colquhoun	Henry Glassford	resigned
22 February 1806	Surrey	u*	Lord William Russell	Lord William Russell	appointed
24 February 1806	Appleby	u*	John Courtenay	John Courtenay	appointed
24 February 1806	Haverfordwest	u*	The Lord Kensington	The Lord Kensington	appointed
24 February 1806	Lichfield	u*	Thomas Anson	George Anson	peerage
24 February 1806	Richmond	u*	George Dundas	Charles Lawrence Dundas	resigned
24 February 1806	Wilton	u*	The Viscount Fitzwilliam	Charles Herbert	resigned
25 February 1806	Aldeburgh	u*	John McMahon	John McMahon	appointed
25 February 1806	Knaresborough	u*	Lord John Townshend	Lord John Townshend	appointed
27 February 1806	Cashel	u	William Wickham	William Wickham	appointed
28 February 1806	Stafford	u	Richard Brinsley Sheridan	Richard Brinsley Sheridan	appointed
3 March 1806	Worcestershire	c*	William Lygon	William Beauchamp Lygon	peerage
6 March 1806	Plymouth	u*	Philip Langmead	Thomas Tyrwhitt	resigned
14 March 1806	Enniskillen	u	Sir William Burroughs	John King	appointed
14 March 1806	Waterford City	u*	Sir (Simon) John Newport	Sir (Simon) John Newport	resigned
15 March 1806	Corfe Castle	u*	Nathaniel Bond	Nathaniel Bond	appointed
15 March 1806	Portarlington	u	Thomas Tyrwhitt	John Langston	resigned
18 March 1806	Lyme Regis	u*	Thomas Fane	Lord Burghersh	resigned
21 March 1806	Queenborough	u*	George Peter Moore	Sir Samuel Romilly	resigned
1 April 1806	Rye	u	Thomas Davis Lamb	Sir Arthur Wellesley	resigned
11 April 1806	Honiton	u	Sir John Honywood	Richard Bateman-Robson	died
11 April 1806	Peterborough	u*	William Elliot	William Elliot	appointed
12 April 1806	County Kilkenny	u	William Brabazon Ponsonby	George Ponsonby	peerage
17 April 1806	County Sligo	u*	Charles O'Hara	Charles O'Hara	appointed
17 April 1806	Haddington Burghs	u	John Dalrymple	Henry Erskine	resigned
18 April 1806	Queen's County	u*	Henry Brooke Parnell	Henry Brooke Parnell	appointed
21 April 1806	Helston	u	Davies Giddy	Sir John Shelley	resigned
26 April 1806	Weymouth & Melcombe Regis	u*	William Garthshore	Richard Steward	died
29 April 1806	Kinsale	u*	Samuel Campbell Rowley	Henry Martin	resigned
10 May 1806	County Galway	u*	Denis Bowes Daly	Denis Bowes Daly	appointed
10 May 1806	Wicklow	u*	George Ponsonby	William Tighe	appointed
22 May 1806	Cheshire	u*	William Egerton	Davies Davenport	died
27 May 1806	County Wexford	c	Viscount Loftus	Caesar Colclough	peerage
2 June 1806	Westmorland	u*	Sir Michael le Fleming	The Lord Muncaster	died
9 June 1806	Carlow	u	Charles Montagu Ormsby	Michael Symes	appointed
16 June 1806	Somerset	u*	William Dickinson	Thomas Buckler Lethbridge	died
17 June 1806	Honiton	c*	Augustus Cavendish-Bradshaw	Augustus Cavendish-Bradshaw	appointed
14 July 1806	Buckingham	u*	Thomas Grenville	Thomas Grenville	appointed
16 July 1806	Sligo	u*	Owen Wynne	George Canning	resigned
28 July 1806	Seaford	c*	Sir Richard Joseph Sullivan	John Leach	died
31 July 1806	Enniskillen	u	John King	William Henry Fremantle	resigned
1 August 1806	Bodmin	u	John Sargent	James Topping	resigned
1 August 1806	Buckingham	u	Lord Proby	Earl Percy	resigned
7 October 1806	Westminster	u	Charles James Fox	Earl Percy	died

== See also ==
- Members of the 1st UK Parliament from Ireland
- Members of the 2nd UK Parliament from Ireland
