= List of lords commissioners of the Treasury =

This is a list of Lords Commissioners of the Treasury of Great Britain (1714–1801) and of the United Kingdom (1817–present).

In modern times, the Lords Commissioners of the Treasury are the Prime Minister (who is also the First Lord of the Treasury), the Chancellor of the Exchequer and some government whips. Although there is a small overlap, this list should not be confused with a list of ministers in HM Treasury.

In addition, for earlier officials, see the list of lord high treasurers of England and Great Britain .

== Commissioners of the Treasury of Great Britain (1714–1817) ==
=== Townshend ministry (1714–1717) ===
- 13 October 1714
  - Charles Montagu, 1st Earl of Halifax (First Lord)
  - Sir Richard Onslow (Chancellor of the Exchequer)
  - Sir William St Quintin, 3rd Baronet
  - Edward Wortley Montagu
  - Paul Methuen
- 23 May 1715
  - Charles Howard, 3rd Earl of Carlisle (First Lord)
  - Sir Richard Onslow (Chancellor of the Exchequer)
  - Sir William St Quintin, 3rd Baronet
  - Edward Wortley Montagu
  - Paul Methuen
- 11 October 1715
  - Robert Walpole (First Lord and Chancellor of the Exchequer)
  - Daniel Finch, Lord Finch
  - Sir William St Quintin, 3rd Baronet
  - Paul Methuen
  - Thomas Newport
- 25 June 1716
  - Robert Walpole (First Lord and Chancellor of the Exchequer)
  - Sir William St Quintin, 3rd Baronet
  - Paul Methuen
  - Thomas Newport, 1st Baron Torrington
  - Richard Edgcumbe

=== Stanhope–Sunderland ministry (1717–1718) ===
- 15 April 1717
  - James Stanhope (First Lord and Chancellor of the Exchequer)
  - Thomas Newport, 1st Baron Torrington
  - John Wallop
  - George Baillie
  - Thomas Micklethwaite

=== Stanhope–Sunderland ministry (1718–1721) ===
- 20 March 1718
  - Charles Spencer, 3rd Earl of Sunderland (First Lord)
  - John Aislabie (Chancellor of the Exchequer)
  - John Wallop
  - George Baillie
  - William Clayton
- 11 June 1720
  - Charles Spencer, 3rd Earl of Sunderland (First Lord)
  - John Aislabie
  - George Baillie
  - Sir Charles Turner
  - Richard Edgcumbe

=== Walpole–Townshend ministry (1721–1730) ===
- 3 April 1721
  - Robert Walpole (First Lord and Chancellor of the Exchequer)
  - George Baillie
  - Sir Charles Turner
  - Richard Edgcumbe
  - Henry Pelham
- 23 March 1724
  - Robert Walpole (First Lord and Chancellor of the Exchequer)
  - George Baillie
  - Sir Charles Turner
  - Henry Pelham
  - William Yonge
- 2 April 1724
  - Robert Walpole (First Lord and Chancellor of the Exchequer)
  - George Baillie
  - Sir Charles Turner
  - William Yonge
  - George Bubb Dodington
- 27 May 1725
  - Sir Robert Walpole (First Lord and Chancellor of the Exchequer)
  - Sir Charles Turner
  - Sir William Yonge
  - George Bubb Dodington
  - Sir William Strickland, 4th Baronet
- 28 July 1727
  - Sir Robert Walpole (First Lord and Chancellor of the Exchequer)
  - Sir Charles Turner, 1st Baronet
  - George Bubb Dodington
  - Sir George Oxenden, 5th Baronet
  - William Clayton

=== Walpole ministry (1730–1742) ===
- 11 May 1730
  - Sir Robert Walpole (First Lord and Chancellor of the Exchequer)
  - George Bubb Dodington
  - Sir George Oxenden, 5th Baronet
  - William Clayton, 1st Baron Sundon
  - Sir William Yonge, 4th Baronet
- 16 May 1735
  - Sir Robert Walpole (First Lord and Chancellor of the Exchequer)
  - George Bubb Dodington
  - Sir George Oxenden, 5th Baronet
  - William Clayton, 1st Baron Sundon
  - George Cholmondeley, 3rd Earl of Cholmondeley
- 20 May 1736
  - Sir Robert Walpole (First Lord and Chancellor of the Exchequer)
  - George Bubb Dodington
  - Sir George Oxenden, 5th Baronet
  - William Clayton, 1st Baron Sundon
  - Thomas Winnington
- 22 June 1737
  - Sir Robert Walpole (First Lord and Chancellor of the Exchequer)
  - George Bubb Dodington
  - William Clayton, 1st Baron Sundon
  - Thomas Winnington
  - Giles Earle
- 20 October 1740
  - Sir Robert Walpole (First Lord and Chancellor of the Exchequer)
  - William Clayton, 1st Baron Sundon
  - Thomas Winnington
  - Giles Earle
  - George Treby
- 28 April 1741
  - Sir Robert Walpole (First Lord and Chancellor of the Exchequer)
  - Thomas Winnington
  - Giles Earle
  - George Treby
  - Thomas Clutterbuck

=== Carteret ministry (1742–1744) ===
- 16 February 1742
  - Spencer Compton, 1st Earl of Wilmington (First Lord)
  - Samuel Sandys (Chancellor of the Exchequer)
  - George Compton
  - Sir John Rushout, 4th Baronet
  - Phillips Gybbon
- 25 August 1743
  - Henry Pelham (First Lord and Chancellor of the Exchequer)
  - George Compton
  - Phillips Gybbon
  - Charles Sackville, Earl of Middlesex
  - Henry Fox

=== Pelham ministry (1744–1746) ===
- 25 December 1744
  - Henry Pelham (First Lord and Chancellor of the Exchequer)
  - Charles Sackville, Earl of Middlesex
  - Henry Fox
  - Richard Arundell
  - George Lyttelton

=== Pelham ministry (1746–1754) ===
- 24 June 1746
  - Henry Pelham (First Lord and Chancellor of the Exchequer)
  - Charles Sackville, Earl of Middlesex
  - George Lyttelton
  - Henry Bilson Legge
  - John Campbell
- 23 June 1747
  - Henry Pelham (First Lord & Chancellor of the Exchequer)
  - George Lyttelton
  - Henry Bilson Legge
  - John Campbell
  - George Grenville
- 29 April 1749
  - Henry Pelham (First Lord & Chancellor of the Exchequer) (d. 18 March 1754)
  - George Lyttelton
  - John Campbell
  - George Grenville
  - Henry Vane

=== Newcastle ministry (1754–1756) ===
- 6 April 1754
  - Thomas Pelham-Holles, 1st Duke of Newcastle (First Lord)
  - Henry Vane, 1st Earl of Darlington
  - Henry Bilson Legge (Chancellor of the Exchequer)
  - Thomas Hay, Viscount Dupplin
  - Robert Nugent
- 22 November 1755
  - Thomas Pelham-Holles, 1st Duke of Newcastle (First Lord)
  - Henry Vane, 1st Earl of Darlington
  - Sir George Lyttelton, 5th Baronet (Chancellor of the Exchequer)
  - Thomas Hay, Viscount Dupplin
  - Robert Nugent
- 20 December 1755
  - Thomas Pelham-Holles, 1st Duke of Newcastle (First Lord)
  - Sir George Lyttelton, 5th Baronet (Chancellor of the Exchequer)
  - Robert Nugent
  - Percy Wyndham-O'Brien
  - Henry Furnese

=== Pitt–Devonshire ministry (1756–1757) ===
- 16 November 1756
  - William Cavendish, 4th Duke of Devonshire (First Lord)
  - Henry Bilson Legge (Chancellor of the Exchequer)
  - Robert Nugent
  - William Ponsonby, Viscount Duncannon
  - James Grenville

=== Pitt–Newcastle ministry (1757–1762) ===
- 2 July 1757
  - Thomas Pelham-Holles, 1st Duke of Newcastle (First Lord)
  - Henry Bilson Legge (Chancellor of the Exchequer)
  - Robert Nugent
  - James Grenville
  - Frederick North, Lord North
- 22 December 1759
  - Thomas Pelham-Holles, 1st Duke of Newcastle (First Lord)
  - Henry Bilson Legge (Chancellor of the Exchequer)
  - James Grenville
  - Frederick North, Lord North
  - James Oswald
- 12 March 1761
  - Thomas Pelham-Holles, 1st Duke of Newcastle (First Lord)
  - William Barrington-Shute, 2nd Viscount Barrington (Chancellor of the Exchequer)
  - Frederick North, Lord North
  - James Oswald
  - Gilbert Elliot

=== Bute ministry (1762–1763) ===
- 28 May 1762
  - John Stuart, 3rd Earl of Bute (First Lord)
  - Sir Francis Dashwood, 2nd Baronet (Chancellor of the Exchequer)
  - Frederick North, Lord North
  - James Oswald
  - Sir John Turner, 3rd Baronet

=== Grenville ministry (1763–1765) ===
- 15 April 1763
  - George Grenville (First Lord and Chancellor of the Exchequer)
  - Frederick North, Lord North
  - Sir John Turner, 3rd Baronet
  - Thomas Orby Hunter
  - James Harris

=== Rockingham ministry (1765–1766) ===
- 10 July 1765
  - Charles Watson-Wentworth, 2nd Marquess of Rockingham (First Lord)
  - William Dowdeswell (Chancellor of the Exchequer)
  - Lord John Cavendish
  - Thomas Townshend
  - George Onslow

=== Chatham ministry (1766–1768) ===
- 2 August 1766
  - Augustus Henry Fitzroy, 3rd Duke of Grafton (First Lord)
  - Charles Townshend (Chancellor of the Exchequer)
  - Thomas Townshend
  - George Onslow
  - Pryse Campbell
- 1 December 1767
  - Augustus Henry Fitzroy, 3rd Duke of Grafton (First Lord)
  - Frederick North, Lord North (Chancellor of the Exchequer)
  - George Onslow
  - Pryse Campbell
  - Charles Jenkinson

=== Grafton ministry (1768–1770) ===
- 31 December 1768
  - Augustus Henry Fitzroy, 3rd Duke of Grafton (First Lord)
  - Frederick North, Lord North (Chancellor of the Exchequer)
  - George Onslow
  - Charles Jenkinson
  - Jeremiah Dyson

=== North ministry (1770–1782) ===
- 6 February 1770
  - Frederick North, Lord North (First Lord and Chancellor of the Exchequer)
  - George Onslow
  - Charles Jenkinson
  - Jeremiah Dyson
  - Charles Townshend
- 9 January 1773
  - Frederick North, Lord North (First Lord and Chancellor of the Exchequer)
  - George Onslow
  - Jeremiah Dyson
  - Charles Townshend
  - Charles James Fox
- 12 March 1774
  - Frederick North, Lord North (First Lord and Chancellor of the Exchequer)
  - George Onslow
  - Charles Townshend
  - Francis Seymour-Conway, Viscount Beauchamp
  - Charles Wolfran Cornwall
- 5 June 1777
  - Frederick North, Lord North (First Lord and Chancellor of the Exchequer)
  - George Onslow, 4th Baron Onslow
  - Francis Seymour-Conway, Viscount Beauchamp
  - Charles Wolfran Cornwall
  - William Lyttelton, 1st Baron Westcote
- 14 December 1777
  - Frederick North, Lord North (First Lord and Chancellor of the Exchequer)
  - Francis Seymour-Conway, Viscount Beauchamp
  - Charles Wolfran Cornwall
  - William Lyttelton, 1st Baron Westcote
  - Henry Temple, 2nd Viscount Palmerston
- 6 September 1780
  - Frederick North, Lord North (First Lord and Chancellor of the Exchequer)
  - William Lyttelton, 1st Baron Westcote
  - Henry Temple, 2nd Viscount Palmerston
  - Sir Richard Sutton, 1st Baronet
  - John Buller

=== Rockingham ministry (1782) ===
- 27 March 1782
  - Charles Watson-Wentworth, 2nd Marquess of Rockingham (First Lord)
  - Lord John Cavendish (Chancellor of the Exchequer)
  - George John Spencer, Viscount Althorp
  - James Grenville
  - Frederick Montagu

=== Shelburne ministry (1782–1783) ===
- 13 July 1782
  - William Petty, 2nd Earl of Shelburne (First Lord)
  - William Pitt the Younger (Chancellor of the Exchequer)
  - James Grenville
  - Richard Jackson
  - Edward James Eliot

=== Fox–North coalition (1783) ===
- 4 April 1783
  - William Cavendish-Bentinck, 3rd Duke of Portland (First Lord)
  - Lord John Cavendish (Chancellor of the Exchequer)
  - Charles Howard, Earl of Surrey
  - Frederick Montagu
  - Sir Grey Cooper

=== Pitt ministry (1783–1801) ===
- 27 December 1783
  - William Pitt the Younger (First Lord and Chancellor of the Exchequer)
  - James Graham, Marquess of Graham
  - John Buller
  - Edward James Eliot
  - John Aubrey
- 19 September 1786
  - William Pitt the Younger (First Lord and Chancellor of the Exchequer)
  - James Graham, Marquess of Graham
  - Edward James Eliot
  - Sir John Aubrey, 6th Baronet
  - Richard Wellesley, 2nd Earl of Mornington
- 8 April 1789
  - William Pitt the Younger (First Lord and Chancellor of the Exchequer)
  - Edward James Eliot
  - Richard Wellesley, 2nd Earl of Mornington
  - John Pratt, Viscount Bayham
  - Henry Bathurst, Lord Apsley
- 20 June 1791
  - William Pitt the Younger (First Lord and Chancellor of the Exchequer)
  - Edward James Eliot
  - Richard Wellesley, 2nd Earl of Mornington
  - John Pratt, Viscount Bayham
  - Richard Hopkins
- 22 June 1793
  - William Pitt the Younger (First Lord and Chancellor of the Exchequer)
  - Richard Wellesley, 2nd Earl of Mornington
  - John Pratt, Viscount Bayham
  - Richard Hopkins
  - John Townshend
- 7 May 1794
  - William Pitt the Younger (First Lord and Chancellor of the Exchequer)
  - Richard Wellesley, 2nd Earl of Mornington
  - Richard Hopkins
  - John Townshend
  - John Smyth
- 3 February 1797
  - William Pitt the Younger (First Lord and Chancellor of the Exchequer)
  - Richard Wellesley, 2nd Earl of Mornington
  - John Townshend
  - John Smyth
  - Sylvester Douglas
- 3 August 1797
  - William Pitt the Younger (First Lord and Chancellor of the Exchequer)
  - John Townshend
  - John Smyth
  - Sylvester Douglas
  - Charles Small Pybus
- 28 July 1800
  - William Pitt the Younger (First Lord and Chancellor of the Exchequer)
  - John Smyth
  - Sylvester Douglas
  - Charles Small Pybus
  - Lord Granville Leveson-Gower
- 9 December 1800
  - William Pitt (First Lord and Chancellor of the Exchequer)
  - John Smyth
  - Charles Small Pybus
  - Lord Granville Leveson-Gower
  - John Hiley Addington

=== Addington ministry (1801–1804) ===
- 21 March 1801
  - Henry Addington (First Lord and Chancellor of the Exchequer)
  - John Smyth
  - Charles Small Pybus
  - Lord George Thynne
  - Nathaniel Bond
- 5 July 1802
  - Henry Addington (First Lord and Chancellor of the Exchequer)
  - Charles Small Pybus
  - Lord George Thynne
  - Nathaniel Bond
  - John Hiley Addington
- 13 November 1803
  - Henry Addington (First Lord and Chancellor of the Exchequer)
  - Charles Small Pybus
  - Lord George Thynne
  - Nathaniel Bond
  - William Brodrick
- 19 November 1803
  - Henry Addington (First Lord and Chancellor of the Exchequer)
  - Lord George Thynne
  - Nathaniel Bond
  - William Brodrick
  - Edward Golding

=== Pitt ministry (1804–1806) ===
- 16 May 1804
  - William Pitt the Younger (First Lord and Chancellor of the Exchequer)
  - George Percy, Lord Lovaine
  - James Edward Harris, Viscount FitzHarris
  - Charles Long
  - George Spencer, Marquess of Blandford

=== Grenville ministry (1806–1807) ===
- 10 February 1806
  - William Wyndham Grenville, 1st Lord Grenville (First Lord)
  - Lord Henry Petty (Chancellor of the Exchequer)
  - John Charles Spencer, Viscount Althorp
  - William Wickham
  - John Courtenay

=== Portland ministry (1807–1809) ===
- 31 March 1807
  - William Cavendish-Bentinck, 3rd Duke of Portland (First Lord)
  - Spencer Perceval (Chancellor of the Exchequer)
  - William Henry Cavendish-Bentinck, Marquess of Titchfield
  - William Eliot
  - William Sturges Bourne
- 16 September 1807
  - William Cavendish-Bentinck, 3rd Duke of Portland (First Lord)
  - Spencer Perceval (Chancellor of the Exchequer)
  - John Foster
  - William Eliot
  - Richard Ryder
- 2 December 1807
  - William Cavendish-Bentinck, 3rd Duke of Portland (First Lord)
  - Spencer Perceval (Chancellor of the Exchequer)
  - John Foster
  - William Brodrick
  - William Eliot
  - Snowdon Barne

=== Perceval ministry (1809–1812) ===
- 6 December 1809
  - Spencer Perceval (First Lord and Chancellor of the Exchequer)
  - John Foster
  - William Brodrick
  - William Eliot
  - John Cuffe, 2nd Earl of Desart
  - Snowdon Barne
- 23 June 1810
  - Spencer Perceval (First Lord and Chancellor of the Exchequer)
  - John Foster
  - William Brodrick
  - William Eliot
  - Snowdon Barne
  - Berkeley Paget
- 6 January 1812
  - Spencer Perceval (First Lord and Chancellor of the Exchequer)
  - William Wellesley-Pole
  - William Brodrick
  - Snowdon Barne
  - Berkeley Paget
  - Richard Wellesley

=== Liverpool ministry (1812–1827) ===
- 16 June 1812
  - Robert Banks Jenkinson, 2nd Earl of Liverpool (First Lord)
  - Nicholas Vansittart (Chancellor of the Exchequer)
  - William Vesey-FitzGerald
  - Berkeley Paget
  - Frederick John Robinson
  - James Brogden
- 25 November 1813
  - Robert Banks Jenkinson, 2nd Earl of Liverpool (First Lord)
  - Nicholas Vansittart (Chancellor of the Exchequer)
  - William Vesey-FitzGerald
  - Berkeley Paget
  - James Brogden
  - William Lowther, Viscount Lowther
- 20 December 1813
  - Robert Banks Jenkinson, 2nd Earl of Liverpool (First Lord)
  - Nicholas Vansittart (Chancellor of the Exchequer)
  - William Vesey-FitzGerald
  - Berkeley Paget
  - William Lowther, Viscount Lowther
  - Charles Grant

== Commissioners of the Treasury of the United Kingdom (since 1817) ==
Although the United Kingdom of Great Britain and Ireland was created in 1801, it was not until the Consolidated Fund Act 1816 when the separate offices of Lord High Treasurer of Great Britain and Lord High Treasurer of Ireland were united into one office as the Lord High Treasurer of the United Kingdom of Great Britain and Ireland on 5 January 1817. The office continued to remain vacant and the previous commissioners for exercising the office of Treasurer of the Exchequer were appointed to serve as commissioners for exercising the office of Treasurer of the Exchequer and Lord High Treasurer of Ireland.

=== Liverpool ministry cont. (1812–1827) ===
- 7 January 1817
  - Robert Banks Jenkinson, 2nd Earl of Liverpool (First Lord)
  - Nicholas Vansittart (Chancellor of the Exchequer)
  - Berkeley Paget
  - William Lowther, Viscount Lowther
  - Charles Grant
  - John Maxwell-Barry (formerly of the Exchequer of Ireland)
  - William Odell (formerly of the Exchequer of Ireland)
- 25 March 1819
  - Robert Banks Jenkinson, 2nd Earl of Liverpool (First Lord)
  - Nicholas Vansittart (Chancellor of the Exchequer)
  - Berkeley Paget
  - William Lowther, Viscount Lowther
  - Lord Granville Somerset
  - John Maxwell-Barry
  - Edmond Alexander Macnaghten
- 3 May 1823
  - Robert Banks Jenkinson, 2nd Earl of Liverpool (First Lord)
  - Frederick John Robinson (Chancellor of the Exchequer)
  - Berkeley Paget
  - William Lowther, Viscount Lowther
  - Lord Granville Somerset
  - Edmond Alexander Macnaghten
- 13 June 1826
  - Robert Banks Jenkinson, 2nd Earl of Liverpool (First Lord)
  - Frederick John Robinson (Chancellor of the Exchequer)
  - William Lowther, Viscount Lowther
  - Lord Granville Somerset
  - Francis Conyngham, Earl of Mount Charles
  - Edmond Alexander Macnaghten

=== Canning ministry (1827) ===
- 30 April 1827
  - George Canning (First Lord and Chancellor of the Exchequer)
  - Francis Conyngham, Earl of Mount Charles
  - Lord Francis Leveson Gower
  - Edward Granville, Lord Eliot
  - Edmond Alexander Macnaghten
- 31 July 1827
  - George Canning (First Lord and Chancellor of the Exchequer)
  - Francis Conyngham, Earl of Mount Charles
  - Lord Francis Leveson Gower
  - Edward Granville, Lord Eliot
  - Maurice FitzGerald
  - Edmond Alexander Macnaghten

=== Goderich ministry (1827–1828) ===
- 8 September 1827
  - Frederick John Robinson, 1st Viscount Goderich (First Lord)
  - John Charles Herries (Chancellor of the Exchequer)
  - Francis Conyngham, Earl of Mount Charles
  - Edward Granville, Lord Eliot
  - Edmond Alexander Macnaghten

=== Wellington–Peel ministry (1828–1830) ===
- 26 January 1828
  - Arthur Wellesley, 1st Duke of Wellington (First Lord)
  - Henry Goulburn (Chancellor of the Exchequer)
  - Lord Granville Somerset
  - Francis Conyngham, Earl of Mount Charles
  - Edward Granville, Lord Eliot
  - Edmond Alexander Macnaghten
- 24 April 1830
  - Arthur Wellesley, 1st Duke of Wellington (First Lord)
  - Henry Goulburn (Chancellor of the Exchequer)
  - Lord Granville Somerset
  - Edward Granville, Lord Eliot
  - George Bankes
  - Edmond Alexander Macnaghten
- 24 July 1830
  - Arthur Wellesley, 1st Duke of Wellington (First Lord)
  - Henry Goulburn (Chancellor of the Exchequer)
  - Lord Granville Somerset
  - Edward Granville, Lord Eliot
  - George Bankes
  - William Yates Peel

=== Grey ministry (1830–1834) ===
- 24 November 1830
  - Charles Grey, 2nd Earl Grey (First Lord)
  - Charles John Spencer, Viscount Althorp (Chancellor of the Exchequer)
  - George Nugent-Grenville, 2nd Baron Nugent
  - Robert Vernon Smith
  - Francis Thornhill Baring
  - George Ponsonby
- 22 November 1832
  - Charles Grey, 2nd Earl Grey (First Lord)
  - Charles John Spencer, Viscount Althorp (Chancellor of the Exchequer)
  - Robert Vernon Smith
  - Francis Thornhill Baring
  - George Ponsonby
  - Thomas Francis Kennedy
- 9 April 1834
  - Charles Grey, 2nd Earl Grey (First Lord)
  - Charles John Spencer, Viscount Althorp (Chancellor of the Exchequer)
  - Robert Vernon Smith
  - Francis Thornhill Baring
  - George Ponsonby
  - Robert Graham
- 20 June 1834
  - Charles Grey, 2nd Earl Grey (First Lord)
  - Charles John Spencer, Viscount Althorp (Chancellor of the Exchequer)
  - Robert Vernon Smith
  - George Ponsonby
  - Robert Graham
  - George Stevens Byng

=== Melbourne ministry (1834) ===
- 18 July 1834
  - William Lamb, 2nd Viscount Melbourne (First Lord)
  - Charles John Spencer, Viscount Althorp (Chancellor of the Exchequer)
  - Robert Vernon Smith
  - George Ponsonby
  - Robert Graham
  - George Stevens Byng

=== Wellington caretaker ministry (1834) ===
- 21 November 1834
  - Arthur Wellesley, 1st Duke of Wellington (First Lord)
  - James St Clair-Erskine, 2nd Earl of Rosslyn
  - Edward Law, 2nd Baron Ellenborough
  - William Wellesley, 1st Baron Maryborough
  - Sir John Beckett, 2nd Baronet
  - Joseph Planta

=== Peel ministry (1834–1835) ===
- 26 December 1834
  - Sir Robert Peel, 2nd Baronet (First Lord and Chancellor of the Exchequer)
  - William Yates Peel
  - Henry Pelham-Clinton, Earl of Lincoln
  - William David Murray, Viscount Stormont
  - Charles Ross
  - William Ewart Gladstone
- 14 March 1835
  - Sir Robert Peel, 2nd Baronet (First Lord and Chancellor of the Exchequer)
  - William Yates Peel
  - Henry Pelham-Clinton, Earl of Lincoln
  - William David Murray, Viscount Stormont
  - Charles Ross
  - John Iltyd Nicholl

=== Melbourne ministry (1835–1839) ===
- 18 April 1835
  - William Lamb, 2nd Viscount Melbourne (First Lord)
  - Thomas Spring Rice (Chancellor of the Exchequer)
  - Edward Adolphus Seymour, Lord Seymour
  - William Ord
  - Robert Steuart
- 16 May 1835
  - William Lamb, 2nd Viscount Melbourne (First Lord)
  - Thomas Spring Rice (Chancellor of the Exchequer)
  - Edward Adolphus Seymour, Lord Seymour
  - William Henry Ord
  - Robert Steuart
  - Richard More O'Ferrall
- 18 July 1837
  - William Lamb, 2nd Viscount Melbourne (First Lord)
  - Thomas Spring Rice (Chancellor of the Exchequer)
  - Edward Adolphus Seymour, Lord Seymour
  - Robert Steuart
  - Richard More O'Ferrall
  - John Parker
- 28 August 1839
  - William Lamb, 2nd Viscount Melbourne (First Lord)
  - Francis Thornhill Baring (Chancellor of the Exchequer)
  - Robert Steuart
  - John Parker
  - Thomas Wyse, Jr.
  - Henry Tufnell
- 26 May 1840
  - William Lamb, 2nd Viscount Melbourne (First Lord)
  - Francis Thornhill Baring (Chancellor of the Exchequer)
  - John Parker
  - Thomas Wyse, Jr.
  - Henry Tufnell
  - Edward Horsman
- 23 June 1841
  - William Lamb, 2nd Viscount Melbourne (First Lord)
  - Francis Thornhill Baring (Chancellor of the Exchequer)
  - Thomas Wyse, Jr.
  - Henry Tufnell
  - Edward Horsman
  - William Francis Cowper

=== Peel ministry (1841–1846) ===
- 6 September 1841
  - Sir Robert Peel, 2nd Baronet (First Lord)
  - Henry Goulburn (Chancellor of the Exchequer)
  - James Milnes Gaskell
  - Henry Bingham Baring
  - Alexander Pringle
  - John Young
- 21 May 1844
  - Sir Robert Peel, 2nd Baronet (First Lord)
  - Henry Goulburn (Chancellor of the Exchequer)
  - James Milnes Gaskell
  - Henry Bingham Baring
  - Alexander Pringle
  - Lord Arthur Lennox
- 26 April 1845
  - Sir Robert Peel, 2nd Baronet (First Lord)
  - Henry Goulburn (Chancellor of the Exchequer)
  - James Milnes Gaskell
  - Henry Bingham Baring
  - Lord Arthur Lennox
  - William Forbes Mackenzie
- 8 August 1845
  - Sir Robert Peel, 2nd Baronet (First Lord)
  - Henry Goulburn (Chancellor of the Exchequer)
  - James Milnes Gaskell
  - Henry Bingham Baring
  - William Forbes Mackenzie
  - William Cripps
- 11 March 1846
  - Sir Robert Peel, 2nd Baronet (First Lord)
  - Henry Goulburn (Chancellor of the Exchequer)
  - Henry Bingham Baring
  - William Cripps
  - Swynfen Thomas Carnegie
  - Ralph Neville-Grenville

=== Russell ministry (1846–1852) ===
- 6 July 1846
  - Lord John Russell (First Lord)
  - Sir Charles Wood, 3rd Baronet (Chancellor of the Exchequer)
  - Hugh Fortescue, Viscount Ebrington
  - Denis O'Conor
  - William Gibson Craig
  - Henry Rich
- 6 August 1847
  - Lord John Russell (First Lord)
  - Sir Charles Wood, 3rd Baronet (Chancellor of the Exchequer)
  - Hugh Fortescue, Viscount Ebrington
  - William Gibson Craig
  - Henry Rich
  - Richard Montesquieu Bellew
- 24 December 1847
  - Lord John Russell (First Lord)
  - Sir Charles Wood, 3rd Baronet (Chancellor of the Exchequer)
  - William Gibson Craig
  - Henry Rich
  - Richard Montesquieu Bellew
  - Henry Petty-FitzMaurice, Earl of Shelburne (to August 1848)

=== Derby–Disraeli ministry (1852) ===
- 28 February 1852
  - Edward Smith-Stanley, 14th Earl of Derby (First Lord)
  - Benjamin Disraeli (Chancellor of the Exchequer)
  - Richard Grenville, Marquess of Chandos
  - Lord Henry Lennox
  - Thomas Bateson

=== Aberdeen ministry (1852–1855) ===
- 1 January 1853
  - George Hamilton-Gordon, 4th Earl of Aberdeen (First Lord)
  - William Ewart Gladstone (Chancellor of the Exchequer)
  - Lord Alfred Hervey
  - Francis Charteris, Lord Elcho
  - John Sadleir
- 6 March 1854
  - George Hamilton-Gordon, 4th Earl of Aberdeen (First Lord)
  - William Ewart Gladstone (Chancellor of the Exchequer)
  - Lord Alfred Hervey
  - Francis Charteris, Lord Elcho
  - Chichester Fortescue

=== Palmerston ministry (1855–1858) ===
- 10 February 1855
  - Henry Temple, 3rd Viscount Palmerston (First Lord)
  - William Ewart Gladstone (Chancellor of the Exchequer)
  - Lord Alfred Hervey
  - Francis Charteris, Baron Elcho
  - Chichester Fortescue
- 7 March 1855
  - Henry Temple, 3rd Viscount Palmerston (First Lord)
  - Sir George Cornewall Lewis, 2nd Baronet (Chancellor of the Exchequer)
  - Charles Stanley Monck, 4th Viscount Monck
  - Adam Haldane-Duncan, Viscount Duncan
  - Chichester Fortescue
- 16 April 1855
  - Henry John Temple, 3rd Viscount Palmerston (First Lord)
  - Sir George Cornewall Lewis, 2nd Baronet (Chancellor of the Exchequer)
  - Charles Stanley Monck, 4th Viscount Monck
  - Adam Haldane-Duncan, Viscount Duncan
  - Henry Brand

=== Derby–Disraeli ministry (1858–1859) ===
- 1 March 1858
  - Edward Smith-Stanley, 14th Earl of Derby (First Lord)
  - Benjamin Disraeli (Chancellor of the Exchequer)
  - Lord Henry Gordon-Lennox
  - Thomas Edward Taylor
  - Henry Whitmore
- 15 March 1859
  - Edward Smith-Stanley, 14th Earl of Derby (First Lord)
  - Benjamin Disraeli (Chancellor of the Exchequer)
  - Thomas Edward Taylor
  - Henry Whitmore
  - Peter Blackburn

=== Palmerston ministry (1859–1865) ===
- 24 June 1859
  - Henry John Temple, 3rd Viscount Palmerston (First Lord)
  - William Ewart Gladstone (Chancellor of the Exchequer)
  - Edward Knatchbull-Hugessen
  - Sir William Dunbar, 7th Baronet
  - John Bagwell
- 25 March 1862
  - Henry John Temple, 3rd Viscount Palmerston (First Lord)
  - William Ewart Gladstone (Chancellor of the Exchequer)
  - Edward Knatchbull-Hugessen
  - Sir William Dunbar, 7th Baronet
  - Lt. Col. Luke White
- 21 April 1865
  - Henry John Temple, 3rd Viscount Palmerston (First Lord)
  - William Ewart Gladstone (Chancellor of the Exchequer)
  - Edward Knatchbull-Hugessen
  - William Patrick Adam
  - Lt. Col. Luke White

=== Russell ministry (1865–1866) ===
- 6 November 1865
  - John Russell, 1st Earl Russell (First Lord)
  - William Ewart Gladstone (Chancellor of the Exchequer)
  - Edward Knatchbull-Hugessen
  - Lt. Col. Luke White
  - William Patrick Adam
- 2 June 1866
  - John Russell, 1st Earl Russell (First Lord)
  - William Ewart Gladstone (Chancellor of the Exchequer)
  - John Bonham-Carter
  - William Patrick Adam
  - John Esmonde

=== Derby–Disraeli ministry (1866–1868) ===
- 12 July 1866
  - Edward Smith-Stanley, 14th Earl of Derby (First Lord)
  - Benjamin Disraeli (Chancellor of the Exchequer)
  - Hon. Gerard James Noel
  - Sir Graham Graham-Montgomery, 3rd Baronet
  - Henry Whitmore

=== Disraeli ministry (1868) ===
- 29 February 1868
  - Benjamin Disraeli (First Lord)
  - George Ward Hunt (Chancellor of the Exchequer)
  - Gerard James Noel
  - Sir Graham Graham-Montgomery, 3rd Baronet
  - Henry Whitmore
- 2 November 1868
  - Benjamin Disraeli (First Lord)
  - George Ward Hunt (Chancellor of the Exchequer)
  - Lord Claud John Hamilton
  - Sir Graham Graham-Montgomery, 3rd Baronet
  - Henry Whitmore

=== Gladstone ministry (1868–1874) ===
- 16 December 1868
  - William Ewart Gladstone (First Lord)
  - Robert Lowe (Chancellor of the Exchequer)
  - James Stansfeld, Jr.
  - Henry Charles Keith Petty-Fitzmaurice, 5th Marquess of Lansdowne
  - William Patrick Adam
  - John Cranch Walker Vivian
- 2 November 1869
  - William Ewart Gladstone (First Lord)
  - Robert Lowe (Chancellor of the Exchequer)
  - Henry Charles Keith Petty-Fitzmaurice, 5th Marquess of Lansdowne
  - William Patrick Adam
  - John Cranch Walker Vivian
  - William Henry Gladstone
- 8 August 1873
  - William Ewart Gladstone (First Lord and Chancellor of the Exchequer)
  - Lord Frederick Charles Cavendish
  - William Henry Gladstone
  - Algernon William Fulke Greville

=== Disraeli ministry (1874–1880) ===
- 4 March 1874
  - Benjamin Disraeli (First Lord)
  - Sir Stafford Northcote, 8th Baronet (Chancellor of the Exchequer)
  - Arthur Stanhope, Viscount Mahon
  - Rowland Winn
  - Sir James Dalrymple-Horn-Elphinstone, 2nd Baronet
- 16 February 1876
  - Benjamin Disraeli, 1st Earl of Beaconsfield (First Lord)
  - Sir Stafford Northcote, 8th Baronet (Chancellor of the Exchequer)
  - John Crichton, Viscount Crichton
  - Rowland Winn
  - Sir James Dalrymple-Horn-Elphinstone, 2nd Baronet

=== Gladstone ministry (1880–1885) ===
- 5 May 1880
  - William Ewart Gladstone (First Lord and Chancellor of the Exchequer)
  - Sir Arthur Divett Hayter, 2nd Baronet.
  - John Holms
  - Charles Cecil Cotes
- 24 August 1881
  - William Ewart Gladstone (First Lord and Chancellor of the Exchequer)
  - Sir Arthur Divett Hayter, 2nd Baronet.
  - John Holms
  - Charles Cecil Cotes
  - Herbert John Gladstone
- 26 June 1882
  - William Ewart Gladstone (First Lord and Chancellor of the Exchequer)
  - Charles Cecil Cotes
  - Herbert John Gladstone
  - Robert William Duff
- 1 January 1883
  - William Ewart Gladstone (First Lord)
  - Hugh Childers (Chancellor of the Exchequer)
  - Charles Cecil Cotes
  - Herbert John Gladstone
  - Robert William Duff

=== Salisbury ministry (1885–1886) ===
- 29 June 1885
  - Stafford Henry Northcote, 1st Earl of Iddesleigh (First Lord)
  - Sir Michael Hicks Beach, 9th Baronet. (Chancellor of the Exchequer)
  - Charles Dalrymple
  - Sidney Herbert
  - Lt. Col. William Hood Walrond

=== Gladstone ministry (1886) ===
- 13 February 1886
  - William Ewart Gladstone (First Lord)
  - Sir William Harcourt (Chancellor of the Exchequer)
  - Sir Edward James Reed
  - Cyril Flower
  - George Granville Leveson-Gower

=== Salisbury ministry (1886–1892) ===
- 9 August 1886
  - Robert Arthur Talbot Gascoyne-Cecil, 3rd Marquess of Salisbury (First Lord)
  - Lord Randolph Henry Spencer Churchill (Chancellor of the Exchequer)
  - Sidney Herbert
  - Col. William Hood Walrond
  - Sir Herbert Maxwell, 7th Baronet
- 17 January 1887
  - William Henry Smith (First Lord)
  - George Joachim Goschen (Chancellor of the Exchequer)
  - Sidney Herbert
  - Col. William Hood Walrond
  - Sir Herbert Maxwell, 7th Baronet
- 9 November 1891
  - Arthur Balfour (First Lord)
  - George Goschen (Chancellor of the Exchequer)
  - Sidney Herbert
  - Col. William Hood Walrond
  - Sir Herbert Maxwell, 7th Baronet

=== Gladstone ministry (1892–1894) ===
- 22 August 1892
  - William Ewart Gladstone (First Lord)
  - Sir William Harcourt (Chancellor of the Exchequer)
  - Thomas Edward Ellis
  - Richard Knight Causton
  - William Alexander McArthur

=== Rosebery ministry (1894–1895) ===
- 15 March 1894
  - Archibald Primrose, 5th Earl of Rosebery (First Lord)
  - Sir William Harcourt (Chancellor of the Exchequer)
  - Thomas Edward Ellis
  - Richard Knight Causton
  - William Alexander McArthur

=== Salisbury ministry (1895–1902) ===
- 6 July 1895
  - Arthur Balfour (First Lord)
  - Sir Michael Hicks Beach, 9th Baronet (Chancellor of the Exchequer)
  - Henry Torrens Anstruther
  - William Hayes Fisher
  - Edward Stanley, Lord Stanley
- November 1900
  - Arthur Balfour (First Lord)
  - Sir Michael Hicks Beach, 9th Baronet (Chancellor of the Exchequer)
  - Henry Torrens Anstruther
  - William Hayes Fisher
  - Ailwyn Fellowes

=== Balfour ministry (1902–1905) ===
- 15 August 1902
  - Arthur Balfour (First Lord)
  - Charles Thomson Ritchie (Chancellor of the Exchequer)
  - Henry Torrens Anstruther
  - Ailwyn Fellowes
  - Henry Forster
- 15 October 1903
  - Arthur Balfour (First Lord)
  - Austen Chamberlain (Chancellor of the Exchequer)
  - Ailwyn Fellowes
  - Henry Forster
  - David Lindsay, Lord Balcarres
- 17 June 1905
  - Arthur Balfour (First Lord)
  - Austen Chamberlain (Chancellor of the Exchequer)
  - Henry Forster
  - David Lindsay, Lord Balcarres
  - Lord Edmund Talbot

=== Campbell-Bannerman ministry (1905–1908) ===
- 22 December 1905
  - Sir Henry Campbell-Bannerman (First Lord)
  - H. H. Asquith (Chancellor of the Exchequer)
  - Jack Pease
  - Herbert Lewis
  - Freeman Freeman-Thomas
  - Cecil Norton
- 25 January 1906
  - Sir Henry Campbell-Bannerman (First Lord)
  - H. H. Asquith (Chancellor of the Exchequer)
  - Jack Pease
  - Herbert Lewis
  - Cecil Norton
  - John Fuller
- 27 February 1907
  - Sir Henry Campbell-Bannerman (First Lord)
  - H. H. Asquith (Chancellor of the Exchequer)
  - Jack Pease
  - Herbert Lewis
  - Cecil Norton
  - John Henry Whitley

=== Asquith ministry (1908–1916) ===
- 8 April 1908
  - H. H. Asquith (First Lord)
  - David Lloyd George (Chancellor of the Exchequer)
  - Jack Pease
  - Herbert Lewis
  - Cecil Norton
  - J. H. Whitley
- 1 June 1908
  - H. H. Asquith (First Lord)
  - David Lloyd George (Chancellor of the Exchequer)
  - Herbert Lewis
  - Cecil Norton
  - J. H. Whitley
- 8 July 1909
  - H. H. Asquith (First Lord)
  - David Lloyd George (Chancellor of the Exchequer)
  - Cecil Norton
  - J. H. Whitley
  - John Gulland
  - Oswald Partington
- 7 March 1910
  - H. H. Asquith (First Lord)
  - David Lloyd George (Chancellor of the Exchequer)
  - John Gulland
  - Oswald Partington
  - William Benn
  - Ernest Soares
  - Percy Illingworth
- 26 January 1911
  - H. H. Asquith (First Lord)
  - David Lloyd George (Chancellor of the Exchequer)
  - Percy Illingworth
  - John Gulland
  - William Benn
  - Ernest Soares
  - William Jones
- 1 May 1911
  - H. H. Asquith (First Lord)
  - David Lloyd George (Chancellor of the Exchequer)
  - Percy Illingworth
  - John Gulland
  - William Benn
  - William Jones
  - Freddie Guest
- 23 February 1912
  - H. H. Asquith (First Lord)
  - David Lloyd George (Chancellor of the Exchequer)
  - Percy Illingworth
  - John Gulland
  - William Benn
  - William Jones
  - Sir Arthur Haworth, 1st Baronet
- 16 August 1912
  - H. H. Asquith (First Lord)
  - David Lloyd George (Chancellor of the Exchequer)
  - John Gulland
  - William Benn
  - William Jones
  - Henry Webb
- 25 January 1915
  - H. H. Asquith (First Lord)
  - David Lloyd George (Chancellor of the Exchequer)
  - William Benn
  - William Jones
  - Henry Webb
- 4 February 1915
  - H. H. Asquith (First Lord)
  - David Lloyd George (Chancellor of the Exchequer)
  - William Benn
  - William Jones
  - Henry Webb
  - Cecil Beck
  - Walter Rea

=== Asquith coalition ministry (1915–1916) ===
- 27 May 1915
  - H. H. Asquith (First Lord)
  - Reginald McKenna (Chancellor of the Exchequer)
  - George Roberts
  - Geoffrey Howard
  - William Bridgeman
  - Walter Rea

=== Lloyd George ministry (1916–1922) ===
- 11 December 1916
  - David Lloyd George (First Lord)
  - Bonar Law (Chancellor of the Exchequer)
  - James Hope
  - John Pratt
- 26 January 1917
  - David Lloyd George (First Lord)
  - Bonar Law (Chancellor of the Exchequer)
  - James Hope
  - John Pratt
  - Stanley Baldwin
- 29 January 1917
  - David Lloyd George (First Lord)
  - Bonar Law (Chancellor of the Exchequer)
  - James Hope
  - John Pratt
  - Stanley Baldwin
  - James Parker
  - Towyn Jones
- 21 June 1917
  - David Lloyd George (First Lord)
  - Bonar Law (Chancellor of the Exchequer)
  - James Hope
  - John Pratt
  - James Parker
  - Towyn Jones
- 14 January 1919
  - David Lloyd George (First Lord)
  - Austen Chamberlain (Chancellor of the Exchequer)
  - James Hope
  - John Pratt
  - James Parker
  - Towyn Jones
- 14 January 1919
  - David Lloyd George (First Lord)
  - Austen Chamberlain (Chancellor of the Exchequer)
  - John Pratt
  - James Parker
  - Towyn Jones
- 5 February 1919
  - David Lloyd George (First Lord)
  - Austen Chamberlain (Chancellor of the Exchequer)
  - John Pratt
  - James Parker
  - Towyn Jones
  - Robert Sanders
- 14 August 1919
  - David Lloyd George (First Lord)
  - Austen Chamberlain (Chancellor of the Exchequer)
  - Robert Sanders
  - James Parker
  - Towyn Jones
  - Sir Godfrey Collins
- 14 February 1920
  - David Lloyd George (First Lord)
  - Austen Chamberlain (Chancellor of the Exchequer)
  - Sir Robert Sanders, 1st Baronet
  - James Parker
  - Towyn Jones
  - Sir Sir William Sutherland
- 26 March 1920
  - David Lloyd George (First Lord)
  - Austen Chamberlain (Chancellor of the Exchequer)
  - Sir Robert Sanders, 1st Baronet
  - James Parker
  - Towyn Jones
  - Sir William Sutherland
- 1 April 1921
  - David Lloyd George (First Lord)
  - Sir Robert Horne (Chancellor of the Exchequer)
  - James Parker
  - Towyn Jones
  - William Sutherland
  - Sir John Gilmour, 2nd Baronet
- July 1922
  - David Lloyd George (First Lord)
  - Sir Robert Horne (Chancellor of the Exchequer)
  - James Parker
  - Sir John Gilmour, 2nd Baronet
  - Thomas Arthur Lewis

=== Law ministry (1922–1923) ===
- October 1922
  - Bonar Law (First Lord)
  - Stanley Baldwin (Chancellor of the Exchequer)
  - Henry Douglas King
  - Albert Buckley
- 6 December 1922
  - Bonar Law (First Lord)
  - Stanley Baldwin (Chancellor of the Exchequer)
  - Henry Douglas King
  - Albert Buckley
  - George Hennessy
- 6 February 1923
  - Bonar Law (First Lord)
  - Stanley Baldwin (Chancellor of the Exchequer)
  - Henry Douglas King
  - Albert Buckley
  - George Hennessy
  - Frederick Thomson
- 22 March 1923
  - Bonar Law (First Lord)
  - Stanley Baldwin (Chancellor of the Exchequer)
  - Henry Douglas King
  - George Hennessy
  - Frederick Thomson
  - William Cope
- 10 April 1923
  - Bonar Law (First Lord)
  - Stanley Baldwin (Chancellor of the Exchequer)
  - Henry Douglas King
  - George Hennessy
  - William Cope
  - Patrick Johnston Ford

=== Baldwin ministry (1923–1924) ===
- 25 May 1923
  - Stanley Baldwin (First Lord and Chancellor of the Exchequer)
  - Henry Douglas King
  - George Hennessy
  - William Cope
  - Patrick Johnston Ford
- 18 July 1923
  - Stanley Baldwin (First Lord and Chancellor of the Exchequer)
  - Sir William Joynson-Hicks, 1st Baronet
  - Henry Douglas King
  - George Hennessy
  - William Cope
  - Patrick Johnston Ford
- 24 August 1923
  - Stanley Baldwin (First Lord)
  - Neville Chamberlain (Chancellor of the Exchequer)
  - Henry Douglas King
  - George Hennessy
  - William Cope
  - Patrick Johnston Ford
- December 1923
  - Stanley Baldwin (First Lord)
  - Neville Chamberlain (Chancellor of the Exchequer)
  - Henry Douglas King
  - George Hennessy
  - William Cope
  - Sir John Gilmour, 2nd Baronet

=== MacDonald ministry (1924) ===
- 20 February 1924
  - Ramsay MacDonald (First Lord)
  - Philip Snowden (Chancellor of the Exchequer)
  - William Graham
  - Frederick Hall
  - Tom Kennedy
  - John Robertson
  - George Henry Warne

=== Baldwin ministry (1924–1929) ===
- 7 November 1924
  - Stanley Baldwin (First Lord)
  - Winston Churchill (Chancellor of the Exchequer)
  - George Hennessy
  - William Cope
  - Frederick Thomson
  - Francis Curzon, Viscount Curzon
  - Edward Stanley, Lord Stanley
- 17 December 1925
  - Stanley Baldwin (First Lord)
  - Winston Churchill (Chancellor of the Exchequer)
  - William Cope
  - Frederick Thomson
  - Francis Curzon, Viscount Curzon
  - Edward Stanley, Lord Stanley
- 28 July 1926
  - Stanley Baldwin (First Lord)
  - Winston Churchill (Chancellor of the Exchequer)
  - William Cope
  - Frederick Thomson
  - Francis Curzon, Viscount Curzon
  - Edward Stanley, Lord Stanley
  - David Margesson
- 14 January 1928
  - Stanley Baldwin (First Lord)
  - Winston Churchill (Chancellor of the Exchequer)
  - Francis Curzon, Viscount Curzon
  - David Margesson
  - George Bowyer
  - Frederick Penny
  - William Cavendish-Bentinck, Marquess of Titchfield
- 15 January 1929
  - Stanley Baldwin (First Lord)
  - Winston Churchill (Chancellor of the Exchequer)
  - David Margesson
  - George Bowyer
  - Frederick Penny
  - Marquess of Titchfield
  - Euan Wallace

=== MacDonald ministry (1929–1931) ===
- 11 June 1929
  - Ramsay MacDonald (First Lord)
  - Philip Snowden (Chancellor of the Exchequer)
  - John Allen Parkinson
  - Charles Edwards
  - Alfred Barnes
- 24 June 1929
  - Ramsay MacDonald (First Lord)
  - Philip Snowden (Chancellor of the Exchequer)
  - John Allen Parkinson
  - Charles Edwards
  - Alfred Barnes
  - William Whiteley
  - Wilfred Paling
- 24 October 1930
  - Ramsay MacDonald (First Lord)
  - Philip Snowden (Chancellor of the Exchequer)
  - John Allen Parkinson
  - Charles Edwards
  - William Whiteley
  - Wilfred Paling
  - Ernest Thurtle
- 20 March 1931
  - Ramsay MacDonald (First Lord)
  - Philip Snowden (Chancellor of the Exchequer)
  - Charles Edwards
  - William Whiteley
  - Wilfred Paling
  - Ernest Thurtle
  - Henry Charles Charleton

=== MacDonald ministry (1931–1935) ===
- 26 August 1931
  - Ramsay MacDonald (First Lord)
  - Philip Snowden (Chancellor of the Exchequer)
- 28 August 1931
  - Ramsay MacDonald (First Lord)
  - Philip Snowden (Chancellor of the Exchequer)
  - David Margesson
- 3 September 1931
  - Ramsay MacDonald (First Lord)
  - Philip Snowden (Chancellor of the Exchequer)
  - David Margesson
  - Sir Frederick Penny
  - William Cavendish-Bentinck, Marquess of Titchfield
  - Euan Wallace
- 10 September 1931
  - Ramsay MacDonald (First Lord)
  - Philip Snowden (Chancellor of the Exchequer)
  - David Margesson
  - Sir Frederick Penny
  - Alec Glassey
  - William Cavendish-Bentinck, Marquess of Titchfield
  - Euan Wallace
- 12 November 1931
  - Ramsay MacDonald (First Lord)
  - Neville Chamberlain (Chancellor of the Exchequer)
  - Sir Victor Warrender, 8th Baronet
  - Geoffrey Shakespeare
  - Austin Hudson
  - Sir Lambert Ward, 1st Baronet
  - Walter Womersley
- 1 October 1932
  - Ramsay MacDonald (First Lord)
  - Neville Chamberlain (Chancellor of the Exchequer)
  - Austin Hudson
  - Sir Lambert Ward, 1st Baronet
  - James Blindell
  - Walter Womersley
  - George Davies
- 12 April 1935
  - Ramsay MacDonald (First Lord)
  - Neville Chamberlain (Chancellor of the Exchequer)
  - Sir Lambert Ward, 1st Baronet
  - James Blindell
  - Sir Walter Womersley
  - George Davies
  - Archibald Southby
- 7 May 1935
  - Ramsay MacDonald (First Lord)
  - Neville Chamberlain (Chancellor of the Exchequer)
  - James Blindell
  - Sir Walter Womersley
  - James Gray Stuart
  - George Davies
  - Archibald Southby

=== Baldwin ministry (1935–1937) ===
- 8 June 1935
  - Stanley Baldwin (First Lord)
  - Neville Chamberlain (Chancellor of the Exchequer)
  - James Blindell
  - Sir Walter Womersley
  - James Stuart
  - George Frederick Davies
  - Archibald Southby
- 7 December 1935
  - Stanley Baldwin (First Lord)
  - Neville Chamberlain (Chancellor of the Exchequer)
  - James Blindell
  - James Stuart
  - Archibald Southby
  - John Morris-Jones
  - Arthur Hope

=== Chamberlain ministry (1937–1940) ===
- 29 May 1937
  - Neville Chamberlain (First Lord)
  - Sir John Simon (Chancellor of the Exchequer)
  - James Stuart
  - Charles Kerr
  - Charles Waterhouse
  - Ronald Cross
  - Thomas Dugdale
- 19 October 1937
  - Neville Chamberlain (First Lord)
  - Sir John Simon (Chancellor of the Exchequer)
  - James Stuart
  - Charles Kerr
  - Thomas Dugdale
  - Patrick Munro
  - Robert Grimston
- 19 May 1938
  - Neville Chamberlain (First Lord)
  - Sir John Simon (Chancellor of the Exchequer)
  - James Stuart
  - Charles Kerr
  - Thomas Dugdale
  - Patrick Munro
  - Stephen Furness
- 5 April 1939
  - Neville Chamberlain (First Lord)
  - Sir John Simon (Chancellor of the Exchequer)
  - James Stuart
  - Thomas Dugdale
  - Patrick Munro
  - Stephen Furness
  - Sir James Edmondson
- 13 November 1939
  - Neville Chamberlain (First Lord)
  - Sir John Simon (Chancellor of the Exchequer)
  - James Stuart
  - Thomas Dugdale
  - Patrick Munro
  - Stephen Furness
  - Patrick Buchan-Hepburn
- 13 February 1940
  - Neville Chamberlain (First Lord)
  - Sir John Simon (Chancellor of the Exchequer)
  - James Stuart
  - Patrick Munro
  - Stephen Furness
  - Patrick Buchan-Hepburn
  - William Boulton

=== Churchill ministry (1940–1945) ===
- 13 May 1940
  - Winston Churchill (First Lord)
  - Sir Kingsley Wood (Chancellor of the Exchequer)
  - James Stuart
  - Patrick Munro
  - Stephen Furness
  - Patrick Buchan-Hepburn
  - William Boulton
- 18 May 1940
  - Winston Churchill (First Lord)
  - Sir Kingsley Wood (Chancellor of the Exchequer)
  - James Stuart
  - Patrick Munro
  - Patrick Buchan-Hepburn
  - Wilfred Paling
  - William Boulton
- 26 June 1940
  - Winston Churchill (First Lord)
  - Sir Kingsley Wood (Chancellor of the Exchequer)
  - James Stuart
  - Patrick Munro
  - Wilfred Paling
  - William Boulton
  - James Thomas
- 8 February 1941
  - Winston Churchill (First Lord)
  - Sir Kingsley Wood (Chancellor of the Exchequer)
  - Thomas Dugdale
  - Patrick Munro
  - William Boulton
  - James Thomas
- 1 March 1941
  - Winston Churchill (First Lord)
  - Sir Kingsley Wood (Chancellor of the Exchequer)
  - Thomas Dugdale
  - Patrick Munro
  - William Boulton
  - James Thomas
  - William Murdoch Adamson
- 23 February 1942
  - Winston Churchill (First Lord)
  - Sir Kingsley Wood (Chancellor of the Exchequer)
  - Patrick Munro
  - William Boulton
  - James Thomas
  - William Murdoch Adamson
  - Arthur Young
- 13 March 1942
  - Winston Churchill (First Lord)
  - Sir Kingsley Wood (Chancellor of the Exchequer)
  - James Thomas
  - William Murdoch Adamson
  - Arthur Young
  - John McEwen
  - Leslie Pym
- 28 September 1943
  - Winston Churchill (First Lord)
  - Sir John Anderson (Chancellor of the Exchequer)
  - William Murdoch Adamson
  - Arthur Young
  - John McEwen
  - Leslie Pym
  - Alec Beechman
- 7 July 1944
  - Winston Churchill (First Lord)
  - Sir John Anderson (Chancellor of the Exchequer)
  - William Murdoch Adamson
  - John McEwen
  - Leslie Pym
  - Alec Beechman
  - Cedric Drewe
- 2 October 1944
  - Winston Churchill (First Lord)
  - Sir John Anderson (Chancellor of the Exchequer)
  - John McEwen
  - William John
  - Leslie Pym
  - Alec Beechman
  - Cedric Drewe
- 6 December 1944
  - Winston Churchill (First Lord)
  - Sir John Anderson (Chancellor of the Exchequer)
  - William John
  - Leslie Pym
  - Alec Beechman
  - Cedric Drewe
  - Patrick Buchan-Hepburn
- 28 May 1945
  - Winston Churchill (First Lord)
  - Sir John Anderson (Chancellor of the Exchequer)
  - Alec Beechman
  - Cedric Drewe
  - Patrick Buchan-Hepburn
  - Robert Cary
  - Charles Mott-Radclyffe

=== Attlee ministry (1945–1951) ===
- 4 August 1945
  - Clement Attlee (First Lord)
  - Hugh Dalton (Chancellor of the Exchequer)
  - Robert Taylor
  - Joseph Henderson
- 10 August 1945
  - Clement Attlee (First Lord)
  - Hugh Dalton (Chancellor of the Exchequer)
  - Robert Taylor
  - Joseph Henderson
  - Frank Collindridge
  - Arthur Blenkinsop
  - Michael Stewart
- 1 April 1946
  - Clement Attlee (First Lord)
  - Hugh Dalton (Chancellor of the Exchequer)
  - Robert Taylor
  - Joseph Henderson
  - Frank Collindridge
  - Arthur Blenkinsop
  - Charles Simmons
- 10 May 1946
  - Clement Attlee (First Lord)
  - Hugh Dalton (Chancellor of the Exchequer)
  - Robert Taylor
  - Joseph Henderson
  - Frank Collindridge
  - Charles Simmons
  - William Hannan
- 9 December 1946
  - Clement Attlee (First Lord)
  - Hugh Dalton (Chancellor of the Exchequer)
  - Robert Taylor
  - Joseph Henderson
  - Charles Simmons
  - William Hannan
  - Julian Snow
- 17 November 1947
  - Clement Attlee (First Lord)
  - Sir Stafford Cripps (Chancellor of the Exchequer)
  - Robert Taylor
  - Joseph Henderson
  - Julian Snow
  - Charles Simmons
  - William Hannan
- 2 February 1949
  - Clement Attlee (First Lord)
  - Sir Stafford Cripps (Chancellor of the Exchequer)
  - Robert Taylor
  - Joseph Henderson
  - Julian Snow
  - William Hannan
  - Richard Adams
- 2 January 1950
  - Clement Attlee (First Lord)
  - Sir Stafford Cripps (Chancellor of the Exchequer)
  - Robert Taylor
  - Julian Snow
  - William Hannan
  - Richard Adams
  - William Wilkins
- 4 March 1950
  - Clement Attlee (First Lord)
  - Sir Stafford Cripps (Chancellor of the Exchequer)
  - Robert Taylor
  - William Hannan
  - Richard Adams
  - William Wilkins
  - Herbert Bowden
- 24 April 1950
  - Clement Attlee (First Lord)
  - Sir Stafford Cripps (Chancellor of the Exchequer)
  - Robert Taylor
  - William Hannan
  - William Wilkins
  - Herbert Bowden
  - Charles Royle
- 25 October 1950
  - Clement Attlee (First Lord)
  - Hugh Gaitskell (Chancellor of the Exchequer)
  - Robert Taylor
  - William Hannan
  - William Wilkins
  - Herbert Bowden
  - Charles Royle

=== Churchill ministry (1951–1955) ===
- 27 October 1951
  - Winston Churchill (First Lord)
  - Rab Butler (Chancellor of the Exchequer)
- 7 November 1951
  - Winston Churchill (First Lord)
  - Rab Butler (Chancellor of the Exchequer)
  - Harry Mackeson
  - Herbert Butcher
  - Tam Galbraith
  - Dennis Vosper
  - Edward Heath
- 28 May 1951
  - Winston Churchill (First Lord)
  - Rab Butler (Chancellor of the Exchequer)
  - Edward Heath
  - Herbert Butcher
  - Tam Galbraith
  - Dennis Vosper
  - Hendrie Oakshott
- 4 July 1953
  - Winston Churchill (First Lord)
  - Rab Butler (Chancellor of the Exchequer)
  - Edward Heath
  - Tam Galbraith
  - Dennis Vosper
  - Hendrie Oakshott
  - Martin Redmayne
- 29 July 1954
  - Winston Churchill (First Lord)
  - Rab Butler (Chancellor of the Exchequer)
  - Edward Heath
  - Dennis Vosper
  - Hendrie Oakshott
  - Martin Redmayne
  - Richard Thompson

=== Eden ministry (1955–1957) ===
- 12 April 1955
  - Sir Anthony Eden (First Lord)
  - Rab Butler (Chancellor of the Exchequer)
  - Edward Heath
  - Hendrie Oakshott
  - Martin Redmayne
  - Richard Thompson
  - Gerald Wills
- 14 June 1955
  - Sir Anthony Eden (First Lord)
  - Rab Butler (Chancellor of the Exchequer)
  - Edward Heath
  - Martin Redmayne
  - Richard Thompson
  - Gerald Wills
  - Peter Legh
- 22 December 1955
  - Sir Anthony Eden (First Lord)
  - Harold Macmillan (Chancellor of the Exchequer)
  - Martin Redmayne
  - Richard Thompson
  - Gerald Wills
  - Peter Legh
- 25 January 1956
  - Sir Anthony Eden (First Lord)
  - Harold Macmillan (Chancellor of the Exchequer)
  - Martin Redmayne
  - Richard Thompson
  - Gerald Wills
  - Peter Legh
  - Edward Wakefield
- 9 April 1956
  - Sir Anthony Eden (First Lord)
  - Harold Macmillan (Chancellor of the Exchequer)
  - Martin Redmayne
  - Gerald Wills
  - Peter Legh
  - Edward Wakefield
  - Harwood Harrison

=== Macmillan ministry (1957–1963) ===
- 14 January 1957
  - Harold Macmillan (First Lord)
  - Peter Thorneycroft (Chancellor of the Exchequer)
  - Martin Redmayne
  - Gerald Wills
  - Peter Legh
  - Edward Wakefield
  - Harwood Harrison
- 10 April 1957
  - Harold Macmillan (First Lord)
  - Peter Thorneycroft (Chancellor of the Exchequer)
  - Martin Redmayne
  - Peter Legh
  - Edward Wakefield
  - Harwood Harrison
  - Anthony Barber
- 29 October 1957
  - Harold Macmillan (First Lord)
  - Peter Thorneycroft (Chancellor of the Exchequer)
  - Martin Redmayne
  - Edward Wakefield
  - Harwood Harrison
  - Anthony Barber
  - Richard Brooman-White
- 7 January 1958
  - Harold Macmillan (First Lord)
  - Derick Heathcoat-Amory (Chancellor of the Exchequer)
  - Martin Redmayne
  - Edward Wakefield
  - Harwood Harrison
  - Anthony Barber
  - Richard Brooman-White
- 1 March 1958
  - Harold Macmillan (First Lord)
  - Derick Heathcoat-Amory (Chancellor of the Exchequer)
  - Martin Redmayne
  - Edward Wakefield
  - Harwood Harrison
  - Richard Brooman-White
  - Paul Bryan
- 30 October 1958
  - Harold Macmillan (First Lord)
  - Derick Heathcoat-Amory (Chancellor of the Exchequer)
  - Martin Redmayne
  - Harwood Harrison
  - Richard Brooman-White
  - Paul Bryan
  - Michael Hughes-Young
- 17 January 1959
  - Harold Macmillan (First Lord)
  - Derick Heathcoat-Amory (Chancellor of the Exchequer)
  - Martin Redmayne
  - Richard Brooman-White
  - Paul Bryan
  - Michael Hughes-Young
  - Graeme Finlay
- 22 October 1959
  - Harold Macmillan (First Lord)
  - Derick Heathcoat-Amory (Chancellor of the Exchequer)
  - Michael Hughes-Young
  - Richard Brooman-White
  - Paul Bryan
  - Graeme Finlay
  - David Gibson-Watt
- 22 June 1960
  - Harold Macmillan (First Lord)
  - Derick Heathcoat-Amory (Chancellor of the Exchequer)
  - Michael Hughes-Young
  - Paul Bryan
  - Graeme Finlay
  - David Gibson-Watt
  - Robin Chichester-Clark
- 28 July 1960
  - Harold Macmillan (First Lord)
  - Selwyn Lloyd (Chancellor of the Exchequer)
  - Michael Hughes-Young
  - Paul Bryan
  - Graeme Finlay
  - David Gibson-Watt
  - Robin Chichester-Clark
- 28 October 1960
  - Harold Macmillan (First Lord)
  - Selwyn Lloyd (Chancellor of the Exchequer)
  - Michael Hughes-Young
  - Paul Bryan
  - David Gibson-Watt
  - Robin Chichester-Clark
  - John Hill
- 6 March 1961
  - Harold Macmillan (First Lord)
  - Selwyn Lloyd (Chancellor of the Exchequer)
  - Michael Hughes-Young
  - David Gibson-Watt
  - Robin Chichester-Clark
  - John Hill
  - William Whitelaw
- 30 November 1961
  - Harold Macmillan (First Lord)
  - Selwyn Lloyd (Chancellor of the Exchequer)
  - Michael Hughes-Young
  - John Hill
  - William Whitelaw
  - John Peel
  - Michael Noble
- 7 March 1962
  - Harold Macmillan (First Lord)
  - Selwyn Lloyd (Chancellor of the Exchequer)
  - John Hill
  - William Whitelaw
  - John Peel
  - Michael Noble
  - Francis Pearson
- 16 July 1962
  - Harold Macmillan (First Lord)
  - Reginald Maudling (Chancellor of the Exchequer)
  - John Hill
  - William Whitelaw
  - John Peel
  - Michael Noble
  - Francis Pearson
- 7 September 1962
  - Harold Macmillan (First Lord)
  - Reginald Maudling (Chancellor of the Exchequer)
  - John Hill
  - John Peel
  - Francis Pearson
  - Gordon Campbell
  - Michael Hamilton
- 7 September 1962
  - Harold Macmillan (First Lord)
  - Reginald Maudling (Chancellor of the Exchequer)
  - John Hill
  - John Peel
  - Francis Pearson
  - Gordon Campbell
  - Michael Hamilton

=== Douglas-Home ministry (1963–1964) ===
- 21 October 1963
  - Sir Alec Douglas-Home (First Lord)
  - Reginald Maudling (Chancellor of the Exchequer)
  - John Hill
  - John Peel
  - Francis Pearson
  - Gordon Campbell
  - Michael Hamilton
- 21 November 1963
  - Sir Alec Douglas-Home (First Lord)
  - Reginald Maudling (Chancellor of the Exchequer)
  - John Hill
  - John Peel
  - Gordon Campbell
  - Michael Hamilton
  - Martin McLaren
- 12 December 1963
  - Sir Alec Douglas-Home (First Lord)
  - Reginald Maudling (Chancellor of the Exchequer)
  - John Hill
  - John Peel
  - Michael Hamilton
  - Martin McLaren
  - Ian MacArthur

=== Wilson ministry (1964–1970) ===
- 21 October 1964
  - Harold Wilson (First Lord)
  - James Callaghan (Chancellor of the Exchequer)
  - George Rogers
  - George Lawson
  - Jack McCann
  - Ifor Davies
  - Harriet Slater
- 11 January 1966
  - Harold Wilson (First Lord)
  - James Callaghan (Chancellor of the Exchequer)
  - John Silkin
  - George Lawson
  - Jack McCann
  - Ifor Davies
  - Harriet Slater
- 14 April 1966
  - Harold Wilson (First Lord)
  - James Callaghan (Chancellor of the Exchequer)
  - Alan Fitch
  - Joseph Harper
  - William Howie
  - George Lawson
  - William Whitlock
- 6 July 1966
  - Harold Wilson (First Lord)
  - James Callaghan (Chancellor of the Exchequer)
  - George Lawson
  - Alan Fitch
  - Joseph Harper
  - William Howie
  - Harry Gourlay
- 31 March 1967
  - Harold Wilson (First Lord)
  - James Callaghan (Chancellor of the Exchequer)
  - William Whitlock
  - Alan Fitch
  - Joseph Harper
  - Harry Gourlay
  - Brian O'Malley
- 28 July 1967
  - Harold Wilson (First Lord)
  - James Callaghan (Chancellor of the Exchequer)
  - Brian O'Malley
  - Alan Fitch
  - Joseph Harper
  - Harry Gourlay
  - Jack McCann
- 28 July 1967
  - Harold Wilson (First Lord)
  - James Callaghan (Chancellor of the Exchequer)
  - Brian O'Malley
  - Alan Fitch
  - Joseph Harper
  - Harry Gourlay
  - Jack McCann
- 29 November 1967
  - Harold Wilson (First Lord)
  - Roy Jenkins (Chancellor of the Exchequer)
  - Brian O'Malley
  - Alan Fitch
  - Joseph Harper
  - Harry Gourlay
  - Jack McCann
- 29 October 1968
  - Harold Wilson (First Lord)
  - Roy Jenkins (Chancellor of the Exchequer)
  - Brian O'Malley
  - Alan Fitch
  - Joseph Harper
  - Jack McCann
  - Walter Harrison
- 13 October 1969
  - Harold Wilson (First Lord)
  - Roy Jenkins (Chancellor of the Exchequer)
  - Walter Harrison
  - Joseph Harper
  - Neil McBride
  - Ernest Armstrong
  - Ernest Perry

=== Heath ministry (1970–1974) ===
- 22 June 1970
  - Edward Heath (First Lord)
  - Iain Macleod (Chancellor of the Exchequer)
- 28 July 1970
  - Edward Heath (First Lord)
  - Anthony Barber (Chancellor of the Exchequer)
  - Reginald Eyre
  - Hector Monro
  - Bernard Weatherill
  - Walter Clegg
  - David Howell
- September 1970
  - Edward Heath (First Lord)
  - Anthony Barber (Chancellor of the Exchequer)
  - Hector Monro
  - Bernard Weatherill
  - Walter Clegg
  - David Howell
- 21 October 1970
  - Edward Heath (First Lord)
  - Anthony Barber (Chancellor of the Exchequer)
  - Hector Monro
  - Bernard Weatherill
  - Walter Clegg
  - David Howell
  - Victor Goodhew
- January 1971
  - Edward Heath (First Lord)
  - Anthony Barber (Chancellor of the Exchequer)
  - Hector Monro
  - Bernard Weatherill
  - Walter Clegg
  - Victor Goodhew
  - Paul Hawkins
- July 1971
  - Edward Heath (First Lord)
  - Anthony Barber (Chancellor of the Exchequer)
  - Bernard Weatherill
  - Walter Clegg
  - Victor Goodhew
  - Paul Hawkins
- October 1971
  - Edward Heath (First Lord)
  - Anthony Barber (Chancellor of the Exchequer)
  - Walter Clegg
  - Victor Goodhew
  - Paul Hawkins
  - Tim Fortescue
  - Keith Speed
- April 1972
  - Edward Heath (First Lord)
  - Anthony Barber (Chancellor of the Exchequer)
  - Victor Goodhew
  - Paul Hawkins
  - Tim Fortescue
  - Hugh Rossi
  - Oscar Murton
- September 1973
  - Edward Heath (First Lord)
  - Anthony Barber (Chancellor of the Exchequer)
  - Victor Goodhew
  - Paul Hawkins
  - Hugh Rossi
  - Oscar Murton
- 9 October 1973
  - Edward Heath (First Lord)
  - Anthony Barber (Chancellor of the Exchequer)
  - Paul Hawkins
  - Hugh Rossi
  - Oscar Murton
- 30 October 1973
  - Edward Heath (First Lord)
  - Anthony Barber (Chancellor of the Exchequer)
  - Paul Hawkins
  - Hugh Rossi
  - Michael Jopling
  - John Stradling Thomas
  - Hamish Gray
- December 1973
  - Edward Heath (First Lord)
  - Anthony Barber (Chancellor of the Exchequer)
  - Hugh Rossi
  - Michael Jopling
  - John Stradling Thomas
  - Hamish Gray
  - Marcus Fox
- January 1974
  - Edward Heath (First Lord)
  - Anthony Barber (Chancellor of the Exchequer)
  - Michael Jopling
  - John Stradling Thomas
  - Hamish Gray
  - Marcus Fox
  - Kenneth Clarke

=== Wilson ministry (1974–1976) ===
- March 1974
  - Harold Wilson (First Lord)
  - Denis Healey (Chancellor of the Exchequer)
  - Donald Coleman
  - James Dunn
  - John Golding
  - James Hamilton
  - Thomas Pendry
- June 1974
  - Harold Wilson (First Lord)
  - Denis Healey (Chancellor of the Exchequer)
  - Donald Coleman
  - James Dunn
  - John Golding
  - Thomas Pendry
  - Michael Cocks
- October 1974
  - Harold Wilson (First Lord)
  - Denis Healey (Chancellor of the Exchequer)
  - Donald Coleman
  - James Dunn
  - Thomas Pendry
  - Michael Cocks
  - Jack Dormand

=== Callaghan ministry (1976–1979) ===
- April 1976
  - James Callaghan (First Lord)
  - Denis Healey (Chancellor of the Exchequer)
  - Donald Coleman
  - Thomas Pendry
  - Jack Dormand
  - Edward Graham
  - David Stoddart
- January 1977
  - James Callaghan (First Lord)
  - Denis Healey (Chancellor of the Exchequer)
  - Donald Coleman
  - Jack Dormand
  - Edward Graham
  - David Stoddart
  - Tom Cox
- November 1977
  - James Callaghan (First Lord)
  - Denis Healey (Chancellor of the Exchequer)
  - Donald Coleman
  - Jack Dormand
  - Edward Graham
  - Tom Cox
  - Peter Snape
- July 1978
  - James Callaghan (First Lord)
  - Denis Healey (Chancellor of the Exchequer)
  - Jack Dormand
  - Edward Graham
  - Tom Cox
  - Peter Snape
  - Albert Stallard
- January 1979
  - James Callaghan (First Lord)
  - Denis Healey (Chancellor of the Exchequer)
  - Jack Dormand
  - Edward Graham
  - Tom Cox
  - Peter Snape
  - Alfred Bates

=== Thatcher ministry (1979–1990) ===
- 8 May 1979
  - Margaret Thatcher (First Lord)
  - Sir Geoffrey Howe (Chancellor of the Exchequer)
- 15 May 1979
  - Margaret Thatcher (First Lord)
  - Sir Geoffrey Howe (Chancellor of the Exchequer)
  - Carol Mather
  - Peter Morrison
  - Lord James Douglas-Hamilton
  - John MacGregor
- 1 June 1979
  - Margaret Thatcher (First Lord)
  - Sir Geoffrey Howe (Chancellor of the Exchequer)
  - Carol Mather
  - Peter Morrison
  - Lord James Douglas-Hamilton
  - John MacGregor
  - David Waddington
- 19 January 1981
  - Margaret Thatcher (First Lord)
  - Sir Geoffrey Howe (Chancellor of the Exchequer)
  - Carol Mather
  - Lord James Douglas-Hamilton
  - Robert Boscawen
  - John Wakeham
  - John Cope
- 6 October 1981
  - Margaret Thatcher (First Lord)
  - Sir Geoffrey Howe (Chancellor of the Exchequer)
  - Robert Boscawen
  - John Cope
  - Anthony Newton
  - Peter Brooke
  - John Gummer
- 26 March 1982
  - Margaret Thatcher (First Lord)
  - Sir Geoffrey Howe (Chancellor of the Exchequer)
  - Robert Boscawen
  - John Cope
  - Peter Brooke
  - John Gummer
  - Alastair Goodlad
- 24 January 1983
  - Margaret Thatcher (First Lord)
  - Sir Geoffrey Howe (Chancellor of the Exchequer)
  - John Cope
  - Peter Brooke
  - Alastair Goodlad
  - Donald Thompson
- 4 March 1983
  - Margaret Thatcher (First Lord)
  - Sir Geoffrey Howe (Chancellor of the Exchequer)
  - John Cope
  - Peter Brooke
  - Alastair Goodlad
  - Donald Thompson
  - David Hunt
- 22 June 1983
  - Margaret Thatcher (First Lord)
  - Nigel Lawson (Chancellor of the Exchequer)
  - Alastair Goodlad
  - Donald Thompson
  - David Hunt
  - Ian Lang
  - Tristan Garel-Jones
- 12 October 1984
  - Margaret Thatcher (First Lord)
  - Nigel Lawson (Chancellor of the Exchequer)
  - Donald Thompson
  - Ian Lang
  - Tristan Garel-Jones
  - Archie Hamilton
  - John Major
- 17 October 1985
  - Margaret Thatcher (First Lord)
  - Nigel Lawson (Chancellor of the Exchequer)
  - Donald Thompson
  - Ian Lang
  - Tristan Garel-Jones
  - Archie Hamilton
  - Tim Sainsbury
- 21 February 1986
  - Margaret Thatcher (First Lord)
  - Nigel Lawson (Chancellor of the Exchequer)
  - Donald Thompson
  - Tristan Garel-Jones
  - Archie Hamilton
  - Tim Sainsbury
  - Michael Neubert
- 10 November 1986
  - Margaret Thatcher (First Lord)
  - Nigel Lawson (Chancellor of the Exchequer)
  - Tim Sainsbury
  - Michael Neubert
  - Tony Durant
  - Peter Lloyd
  - Mark Lennox-Boyd
- 17 July 1987
  - Margaret Thatcher (First Lord)
  - Nigel Lawson (Chancellor of the Exchequer)
  - Michael Neubert
  - Tony Durant
  - Peter Lloyd
  - Mark Lennox-Boyd
  - David Lightbown
- 26 August 1988
  - Margaret Thatcher (First Lord)
  - Nigel Lawson (Chancellor of the Exchequer)
  - Tony Durant
  - David Lightbown
  - Kenneth Carlisle
  - Alan Howarth
  - David Maclean
- 27 January 1989
  - Margaret Thatcher (First Lord)
  - Nigel Lawson (Chancellor of the Exchequer)
  - David Lightbown
  - Kenneth Carlisle
  - Alan Howarth
  - David Maclean
  - Stephen Dorrell
- 21 September 1989
  - Margaret Thatcher (First Lord)
  - Nigel Lawson (Chancellor of the Exchequer)
  - David Lightbown
  - Kenneth Carlisle
  - Stephen Dorrell
  - John Mark Taylor
  - David Heathcoat-Amory
- October 1989
  - Margaret Thatcher (First Lord)
  - John Major (Chancellor of the Exchequer)
  - David Lightbown
  - Kenneth Carlisle
  - Stephen Dorrell
  - John Mark Taylor
  - Tom Sackville
- 14 June 1990
  - Margaret Thatcher (First Lord)
  - John Major (Chancellor of the Exchequer)
  - David Lightbown
  - Kenneth Carlisle
  - John Mark Taylor
  - Tom Sackville
  - Michael Fallon
- 12 September 1990
  - Margaret Thatcher (First Lord)
  - John Major (Chancellor of the Exchequer)
  - John Mark Taylor
  - Tom Sackville
  - Sydney Chapman
  - Greg Knight
  - Irvine Patnick

=== Major ministry (1990–1997) ===
- November 1990
  - John Major (First Lord)
  - Norman Lamont (Chancellor of the Exchequer)
  - Tom Sackville
  - Sydney Chapman
  - Greg Knight
  - Irvine Patnick
  - Nicholas Baker
- April 1992
  - John Major (First Lord)
  - Norman Lamont (Chancellor of the Exchequer)
  - Greg Knight
  - Irvine Patnick
  - Nicholas Baker
  - Timothy Wood
  - Tim Boswell
- December 1992
  - John Major (First Lord)
  - Norman Lamont (Chancellor of the Exchequer)
  - Greg Knight
  - Irvine Patnick
  - Nicholas Baker
  - Timothy Wood
  - Timothy Kirkhope
- 1993
  - John Major (First Lord)
  - Kenneth Clarke (Chancellor of the Exchequer)
  - Irvine Patnick
  - Nicholas Baker
  - Timothy Wood
  - Timothy Kirkhope
  - Andrew MacKay
- 1994
  - John Major (First Lord)
  - Kenneth Clarke (Chancellor of the Exchequer)
  - Timothy Wood
  - Timothy Kirkhope
  - Andrew MacKay
  - Derek Conway
  - Andrew Mitchell
- July 1995
  - John Major (First Lord)
  - Kenneth Clarke (Chancellor of the Exchequer)
  - Andrew MacKay
  - Derek Conway
  - Bowen Wells
  - Simon Burns
  - David Willetts
- October 1995
  - John Major (First Lord)
  - Kenneth Clarke (Chancellor of the Exchequer)
  - Derek Conway
  - Bowen Wells
  - Simon Burns
  - David Willetts
  - Michael Bates
- November 1995
  - John Major (First Lord)
  - Kenneth Clarke (Chancellor of the Exchequer)
  - Derek Conway
  - Bowen Wells
  - Simon Burns
  - Michael Bates
  - Liam Fox
- July 1996
  - John Major (First Lord)
  - Kenneth Clarke (Chancellor of the Exchequer)
  - Bowen Wells
  - Michael Bates
  - Patrick McLoughlin
  - Roger Knapman
  - Richard Ottaway
- December 1996
  - John Major (First Lord)
  - Kenneth Clarke (Chancellor of the Exchequer)
  - Bowen Wells
  - Patrick McLoughlin
  - Roger Knapman
  - Richard Ottaway
  - Gyles Brandreth

=== Blair ministry (1997–2007) ===
- 2 May 1997
  - Tony Blair (First Lord)
  - Gordon Brown (Chancellor of the Exchequer)
  - Robert Ainsworth
  - Graham Allen
  - Jim Dowd
  - John McFall
  - Jon Owen Jones
- 28 July 1998
  - Tony Blair (First Lord)
  - Gordon Brown (Chancellor of the Exchequer)
  - Robert Ainsworth
  - Jim Dowd
  - Clive Betts
  - David Jamieson
  - Jane Kennedy
- 11 October 1999
  - Tony Blair (First Lord)
  - Gordon Brown (Chancellor of the Exchequer)
  - Robert Ainsworth
  - Jim Dowd
  - Clive Betts
  - David Jamieson
- 26 January 2001
  - Tony Blair (First Lord)
  - Gordon Brown (Chancellor of the Exchequer)
  - Jim Dowd
  - Clive Betts
  - David Jamieson
- 6 February 2001
  - Tony Blair (First Lord)
  - Gordon Brown (Chancellor of the Exchequer)
  - Jim Dowd
  - Clive Betts
  - David Jamieson
  - David Clelland
- 12 June 2001
  - Tony Blair (First Lord)
  - Gordon Brown (Chancellor of the Exchequer)
  - Nick Ainger
  - John Heppell
  - Anne McGuire
  - Tony McNulty
  - Graham Stringer
- 29 May 2002
  - Tony Blair (First Lord)
  - Gordon Brown (Chancellor of the Exchequer)
  - Nick Ainger
  - John Heppell
  - Jim Fitzpatrick
  - Jim Murphy
  - Ian Pearson
  - Joan Ryan
  - Derek Twigg
  - Phil Woolas
- 14 June 2002
  - Tony Blair (First Lord)
  - Gordon Brown (Chancellor of the Exchequer)
  - Nick Ainger
  - John Heppell
  - Jim Fitzpatrick
  - Jim Murphy
  - Ian Pearson
  - Joan Ryan
  - Derek Twigg
- 14 October 2002
  - Tony Blair (First Lord)
  - Gordon Brown (Chancellor of the Exchequer)
  - Nick Ainger
  - John Heppell
  - Jim Fitzpatrick
  - Jim Murphy
  - Joan Ryan
  - Derek Twigg
  - Bill Rammell
- 28 October 2002
  - Tony Blair (First Lord)
  - Gordon Brown (Chancellor of the Exchequer)
  - Nick Ainger
  - John Heppell
  - Jim Fitzpatrick
  - Jim Murphy
  - Joan Ryan
  - Derek Twigg
- 13 June 2003
  - Tony Blair (First Lord)
  - Gordon Brown (Chancellor of the Exchequer)
  - Nick Ainger
  - John Heppell
  - Jim Murphy
  - Joan Ryan
  - Derek Twigg
- December 2004
  - Tony Blair (First Lord)
  - Gordon Brown (Chancellor of the Exchequer)
  - Nick Ainger
  - John Heppell
  - Jim Murphy
  - Joan Ryan
  - Gillian Merron
- 11 May 2005
  - Tony Blair (First Lord)
  - Gordon Brown (Chancellor of the Exchequer)
  - Gillian Merron
  - Vernon Coaker
  - Tom Watson
  - David Watts
  - Joan Ryan
- 8 May 2006
  - Tony Blair (First Lord)
  - Gordon Brown (Chancellor of the Exchequer)
  - David Watts
  - Alan Campbell
  - Kevin Brennan
  - Frank Roy
  - Claire Ward

=== Brown ministry (2007–2010) ===
- 29 June 2007
  - Gordon Brown (First Lord)
  - Alistair Darling (Chancellor of the Exchequer)
  - David Watts
  - Alan Campbell
  - Frank Roy
  - Claire Ward
  - Steve McCabe
- 6 October 2008
  - Gordon Brown (First Lord)
  - Alistair Darling (Chancellor of the Exchequer)
  - David Watts
  - Frank Roy
  - Steve McCabe
  - Tony Cunningham
  - Bob Blizzard

=== Cameron–Clegg coalition (2010–2015) ===
- May 2010
  - David Cameron (First Lord)
  - George Osborne (Chancellor of the Exchequer)
  - Michael Fabricant
  - Angela Watkinson
  - Jeremy Wright
  - Brooks Newmark
  - James Duddridge
- September 2012
  - David Cameron (First Lord)
  - George Osborne (Chancellor of the Exchequer)
  - Desmond Swayne
  - Anne Milton
  - Mark Lancaster
  - David Evennett
  - Robert Goodwill
  - Stephen Crabb
- 7 October 2013
  - David Cameron (First Lord)
  - George Osborne (Chancellor of the Exchequer)
  - Sam Gyimah
  - Anne Milton
  - Mark Lancaster
  - David Evennett
  - Karen Bradley
  - Stephen Crabb
- 8 February 2014
  - David Cameron (First Lord)
  - George Osborne (Chancellor of the Exchequer)
  - Sam Gyimah
  - Anne Milton
  - Mark Lancaster
  - David Evennett
  - John Penrose
  - Stephen Crabb
- 15 July 2014
  - David Cameron (First Lord)
  - George Osborne (Chancellor of the Exchequer)
  - Gavin Barwell
  - Harriett Baldwin
  - Mark Lancaster
  - David Evennett
  - John Penrose
  - Alun Cairns

=== Cameron ministry (2015–2016) ===
- 13 May 2015
  - David Cameron (First Lord)
  - George Osborne (Chancellor of the Exchequer)
  - Mel Stride
  - Charlie Elphicke
  - George Hollingbery
  - David Evennett
  - John Penrose
  - Alun Cairns
- 19 March 2016
  - David Cameron (First Lord)
  - George Osborne (Chancellor of the Exchequer)
  - Mel Stride
  - Charlie Elphicke
  - George Hollingbery
  - David Evennett
  - John Penrose
  - Guto Bebb

=== May ministry (2016–2019) ===
- 17 July 2016
  - Theresa May (First Lord)
  - Philip Hammond (Chancellor of the Exchequer)
  - David Evennett
  - Guto Bebb
  - Steve Barclay
  - Guy Opperman
  - Robert Syms
  - Andrew Griffiths
- 15 June 2017
  - Theresa May (First Lord)
  - Philip Hammond (Chancellor of the Exchequer)
  - David Evennett
  - Guto Bebb
  - Mark Spencer
  - Heather Wheeler
  - David Rutley
  - Andrew Griffiths
- 9 January 2018
  - Theresa May (First Lord)
  - Philip Hammond (Chancellor of the Exchequer)
  - Andrew Stephenson
  - Paul Maynard
  - Craig Whittaker
  - Rebecca Harris
  - David Rutley
  - Nigel Adams

=== Johnson ministry (2019–2022) ===
- 3 September 2019
  - Boris Johnson (First Lord)
  - Sajid Javid (Chancellor of the Exchequer)
  - Rebecca Harris
  - David Rutley
  - Michael Freer
  - Michelle Donelan
  - Nus Ghani
  - Colin Clark
- 5 February 2020
  - Boris Johnson (First Lord)
  - Sajid Javid (Chancellor of the Exchequer)
  - Rebecca Harris
  - David Rutley
  - Michelle Donelan
  - Iain Stewart
  - Maggie Throup
  - Douglas Ross
- 13 March 2020
  - Boris Johnson (First Lord)
  - Rishi Sunak (Chancellor of the Exchequer)
  - Rebecca Harris
  - David Rutley
  - Iain Stewart
  - Maggie Throup
  - James Morris
  - Michael Tomlinson
- 23 July 2020
  - Boris Johnson (First Lord)
  - Rishi Sunak (Chancellor of the Exchequer)
  - Rebecca Harris
  - David Rutley
  - Maggie Throup
  - James Morris
  - Michael Tomlinson
  - David Duguid
- 11 March 2021
  - Boris Johnson (First Lord)
  - Rishi Sunak (Chancellor of the Exchequer)
  - David Rutley
  - Maggie Throup
  - Rebecca Harris
  - Michael Tomlinson
  - James Morris
  - Scott Mann
- 4 June 2021
  - Boris Johnson (First Lord)
  - Rishi Sunak (Chancellor of the Exchequer)
  - David Rutley
  - Maggie Throup
  - Rebecca Harris
  - Michael Tomlinson
  - James Morris
  - Alan Mak
- 16 November 2021
  - Boris Johnson (First Lord)
  - Rishi Sunak (Chancellor of the Exchequer)
  - Amanda Solloway
  - Lee Rowley
  - Michael Tomlinson
  - Alan Mak
  - Craig Whittaker
  - Rebecca Harris
- 18 March 2022
  - Boris Johnson (First Lord)
  - Rishi Sunak (Chancellor of the Exchequer)
  - Rebecca Harris
  - Michael Tomlinson
  - Alan Mak
  - Lee Rowley
  - Amanda Solloway
  - Gareth Johnson
- 25 July 2022
  - Boris Johnson (First Lord)
  - Nadhim Zahawi (Chancellor of the Exchequer)
  - Gareth Johnson
  - Scott Mann
  - Craig Whittaker
  - David TC Davies
  - James Duddridge

=== Truss ministry (2022) ===
- 18 October 2022
  - Liz Truss (First Lord)
  - Kwasi Kwarteng (Note: Kwasi Kwarteng left office as Chancellor of the Exchequer on 14 October 2022, but he was still appointed as Second Lord of the Treasury in the new letters patent.)
  - David Evennett
  - Amanda Solloway
  - Nigel Huddleston
  - Sarah Dines
  - Adam Holloway

=== Sunak ministry (2022–2024) ===
- 28 November 2022
  - Rishi Sunak (First Lord)
  - Jeremy Hunt (Chancellor of the Exchequer)
  - Andrew Stephenson
  - Amanda Solloway
  - Nigel Huddleston
  - Scott Mann
  - Stephen Double
- 3 May 2023
  - Rishi Sunak (First Lord)
  - Jeremy Hunt (Chancellor of the Exchequer)
  - Andrew Stephenson
  - Stephen Double
  - Scott Mann
  - Amanda Solloway
  - Stuart Anderson
- 15 December 2023
  - Rishi Sunak (First Lord)
  - Jeremy Hunt (Chancellor of the Exchequer)
  - Amanda Milling
  - Scott Mann
  - Amanda Solloway
  - Joy Morrissey
  - Mike Wood

=== Starmer ministry (2024–2026) ===
- 16 July 2024
  - Keir Starmer (First Lord of the Treasury)
  - Rachel Reeves (Chancellor of the Exchequer)
  - Nic Dakin (Vice-Chamberlain of the Household)
  - Vicky Foxcroft
  - Taiwo Owatemi
  - Jeff Smith
  - Anna Turley
- 9 October 2025
  - Keir Starmer (First Lord)
  - Rachel Reeves (Chancellor of the Exchequer)
  - Christian Wakeford
  - Gen Kitchen
  - Lilian Greenwood
  - Stephen Morgan
  - Taiwo Owatemi
- 16 June 2026
  - Keir Starmer (First Lord)
  - Rachel Reeves (Chancellor of the Exchequer)
  - Christian Wakeford
  - Lilian Greenwood
  - Stephen Morgan
  - Taiwo Owatemi
  - Deirdre Costigan

=== Burnham ministry (2026–present) ===
- 3 September 2026
  - Andy Burnham (First Lord)
  - John Healey (Chancellor of the Exchequer)
  - Christian Wakeford
  - Jade Botterill
  - Gregor Poynton
  - Claire Hughes
  - Shaun Davies
