= List of Escheators of Ulster =

This is a list of the Members of Parliament appointed as Escheator of Ulster, a notional 'office of profit under the crown' which was used at times to resign from the Irish House of Commons.

The escheator was originally responsible for the administration of escheat /ɪsˈtʃiːt/, a common law doctrine that transfers the real property of a person who has died without heirs to the crown or state.

The office was formerly substantive. It was founded in 1605, when the escheatorship for Ireland was divided among the provinces of Connaught, Leinster, Munster, and Ulster.

== Substantive holders ==
- bef. 1760: John King

== Members of the Irish House of Commons ==
- 1799: Luke Fox (Clonmines)
- 1799: Charles Ruxton (Ardee)
- 1799: Henry Stewart (Longford)
- 1799: George Sandford (Roscommon)
- March 1799: Hugh Howard (St Johnstown)
- 1800: Theophilus Blakeney (Athenry)
- 1800: Sir Richard St George, 2nd Baronet (Athlone)
- 1800: Thomas Lindsay (Castlebar)
- 1800: Henry Luttrell (Clonmines)
- 1800: William Thomas Monsell (Dingle)
- 1800: George Bunbury (Gowran)
- 1800: Robert Taylour (Kells)
- 1800: Charles Silver Oliver (Kilmallock)
- 1800: Robert Alexander (Newtownards)
- January 1800: Barry Boyle St Leger (Doneraile)
- February 1800: Robert Johnson (Hillsborough)
- April 1800: Thomas Staples (Knocktopher)
- May 1800: Charles William Stewart (Thomastown)

== Members of the United Kingdom House of Commons ==
- February 1801: William Talbot (Kilkenny City)
- March 1804: John Claudius Beresford (Dublin City)
- February 1819: Richard Nevill (Wexford)

The last holder died in 1822. In 1838, all of the Irish escheatorships were abolished by the Lord Lieutenant of Ireland.

== See also ==
- Escheator
- Resignation from the British House of Commons
