= First Lord of the Treasury =

Title granted to the UK Prime Minister

United Kingdom First Lord of the Treasury
- Royal Arms of His Majesty's Government

- Flag of the United Kingdom

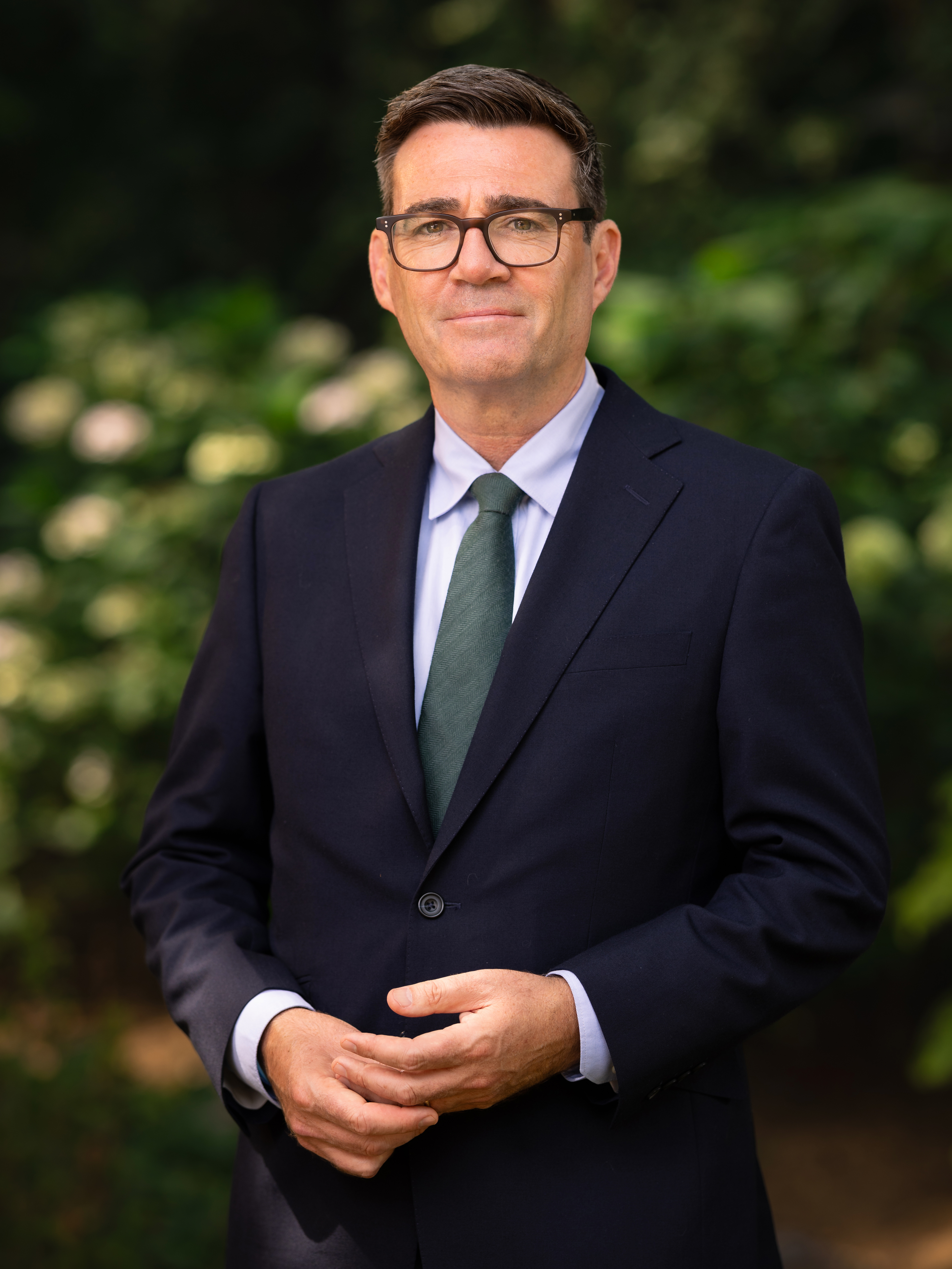
- Incumbent; Andy Burnham since 21 July 2026
- Residence: 10 Downing Street
- Seat: Westminster
- Appointer: The King; appoints ex officio the prime minister
- Term length: At His Majesty's pleasure
- Formation: 1126 (as Lord High Treasurer); 1612 (as First Lord of the Commission of the Treasury); 1714 (commission permanent since resignation of the 1st Duke of Shrewsbury)
- First holder: Nigel (bishop of Ely) (as Lord High Treasurer); 1st Earl of Northampton (as First Lord of the Commission); 1st Earl of Halifax (when the commission became permanent)
- Deputy: Second Lord of the Treasury
- Website: Gov.uk

The first lord of the treasury is a title held by the prime minister of the United Kingdom, as head of the lords commissioners of the treasury exercising the ancient office of Lord High Treasurer. When the ministry of Robert Walpole essentially created the position of prime minister in the 18th century, his primary official and formal title remained first lord of the treasury. 10 Downing Street is technically the official home of the first lord, although it is now entirely associated with the prime minister's office. The first lord is not the United Kingdom's finance minister; this role is instead held by the chancellor of the exchequer, who is the second lord of the treasury.

== Lords of the Treasury ==
As of the beginning of the 17th century, the running of the Treasury was frequently entrusted to a commission, rather than to a single individual. Since 1714, it has permanently been in commission. The commissioners have always since that date been referred to as Lords Commissioners of the Treasury, and adopted ordinal numbers to describe their seniority. Eventually in the middle of the same century, the first lord of the Treasury came to be seen as the natural head of the overall ministry running the country, and, as of the time of Robert Walpole (Whig), began to be known, unofficially, as the prime minister.

The term prime minister was initially, but decreasingly, used as a term of derogation; it was first used officially in a royal warrant only in 1905. William Pitt the Younger said the prime minister "ought to be the person at the head of the finances"—though Pitt also served as chancellor of the exchequer for the entirety of his time as prime minister, so his linkage of the finance portfolio to the premiership was wider than merely proposing the occupation of the first lordship by the prime minister.

Prior to 1841 the first lord of the Treasury also held the office of chancellor of the exchequer unless he was a peer and thus barred from that office; in this case, the second lord of the Treasury usually served as chancellor. Since 1841, the chancellor has always been second lord of the Treasury when he was not also prime minister. By convention, the other Lords Commissioners of the Treasury are also Government Whips in the House of Commons.

== Official residence ==
10 Downing Street is the official residence of the first lord of the Treasury, not the office of prime minister. Chequers, a country house in Buckinghamshire, is the official country residence of the prime minister, used as a weekend and holiday home, although the residence has also been used by other senior members of government.

== List of first lords (1714–1922) ==
Much of this list overlaps with the list of prime ministers of the United Kingdom, but there are some notable differences, principally concerning Lord Salisbury, who was prime minister but not first lord in 1885–1886, 1887–1892 and 1895–1902.

Those first lords who were simultaneously prime minister are indicated in bold.

Those who were considered prime minister only during part of their term are indicated in bold italic.

First Lord	Entered office	Left office	Party
Charles Montagu, Earl of Halifax	13 October 1714	19 May 1715	Whig
Charles Howard, Earl of Carlisle	23 May 1715	10 October 1715	Whig
Robert Walpole	10 October 1715	12 April 1717	Whig
James Stanhope, Earl Stanhope	12 April 1717	21 March 1718	Whig
Charles Spencer, Earl of Sunderland	21 March 1718	3 April 1721	Whig
**Robert Walpole**	3 April 1721	11 February 1742	Whig
**Spencer Compton, Earl of Wilmington**	16 February 1742	2 July 1743	Whig
**Henry Pelham**	27 August 1743	10 February 1746	Whig
William Pulteney, Earl of Bath	10 February 1746	12 February 1746	Whig
**Henry Pelham**	12 February 1746	6 March 1754	Whig
**Thomas Pelham-Holles, Duke of Newcastle**	16 March 1754	16 November 1756	Whig
**William Cavendish, Duke of Devonshire**	16 November 1756	8 June 1757	Whig
James Waldegrave, Earl Waldegrave	8 June 1757	12 June 1757	Whig
**William Cavendish, Duke of Devonshire**	12 June 1757	25 June 1757	Whig
**Thomas Pelham-Holles, Duke of Newcastle**	2 July 1757	26 May 1762	Whig
**John Stuart, Earl of Bute**	26 May 1762	16 April 1763	Tory
**George Grenville**	16 April 1763	13 July 1765	Whig
**Charles Watson-Wentworth, Marquess of Rockingham**	13 July 1765	30 July 1766	Whig
**Augustus FitzRoy, Duke of Grafton (Note: Grafton became Prime Minister on 14 October 1768.)**	30 July 1766	28 January 1770	Whig
**Frederick North, Lord North**	28 January 1770	22 March 1782	Tory
**Charles Watson-Wentworth, Marquess of Rockingham**	27 March 1782	1 July 1782	Whig
**William Petty, Earl of Shelburne**	4 July 1782	2 April 1783	Whig
**William Cavendish-Bentinck, Duke of Portland**	2 April 1783	19 December 1783	Whig
**William Pitt the Younger**	19 December 1783	14 March 1801	Tory
**Henry Addington**	17 March 1801	10 May 1804	Tory
**William Pitt the Younger**	10 May 1804	23 January 1806	Tory
**William Grenville, Lord Grenville**	11 February 1806	31 March 1807	Whig
**William Cavendish-Bentinck, Duke of Portland**	31 March 1807	4 October 1809	Whig
**Spencer Perceval**	4 October 1809	11 May 1812	Tory
**Robert Jenkinson, Earl of Liverpool**	9 June 1812	10 April 1827	Tory
**George Canning**	10 April 1827	8 August 1827	Tory
**F. J. Robinson, Viscount Goderich**	31 August 1827	22 January 1828	Tory
**Arthur Wellesley, Duke of Wellington**	22 January 1828	22 November 1830	Tory
**Charles Grey, Earl Grey**	22 November 1830	16 July 1834	Whig
**William Lamb, Viscount Melbourne**	16 July 1834	14 November 1834	Whig
**Arthur Wellesley, Duke of Wellington**	14 November 1834	10 December 1834	Tory
**Robert Peel**	10 December 1834	8 April 1835	Tory
**William Lamb, Viscount Melbourne**	18 April 1835	30 August 1841	Whig
**Robert Peel**	30 August 1841	29 June 1846	Conservative
**Lord John Russell**	30 June 1846	23 February 1852	Whig
**Edward Smith-Stanley, Earl of Derby**	23 February 1852	19 December 1852	Conservative
**George Hamilton-Gordon, Earl of Aberdeen**	19 December 1852	6 February 1855	Peelite
**Henry John Temple, Viscount Palmerston**	6 February 1855	20 February 1858	Liberal
**Edward Smith-Stanley, Earl of Derby**	20 February 1858	12 June 1859	Conservative
**Henry John Temple, Viscount Palmerston**	12 June 1859	18 October 1865	Liberal
**John Russell, Earl Russell**	29 October 1865	28 June 1866	Liberal
**Edward Smith-Stanley, Earl of Derby**	28 June 1866	27 February 1868	Conservative
**Benjamin Disraeli**	27 February 1868	3 December 1868	Conservative
**William Ewart Gladstone**	3 December 1868	20 February 1874	Liberal
**Benjamin Disraeli (Note: Disraeli became Earl of Beaconsfield in 1876.)**	20 February 1874	23 April 1880	Conservative
**William Ewart Gladstone**	23 April 1880	23 June 1885	Liberal
Stafford Northcote, Earl of Iddesleigh	29 June 1885	1 February 1886	Conservative
**William Ewart Gladstone**	1 February 1886	25 July 1886	Liberal
**Robert Gascoyne-Cecil, Marquess of Salisbury (Note: Salisbury continued to serve as Prime Minister until 11 August 1892.)**	3 August 1886	14 January 1887	Conservative
William Henry Smith	14 January 1887	6 October 1891	Conservative
Arthur Balfour	6 October 1891	15 August 1892	Conservative
**William Ewart Gladstone**	15 August 1892	5 March 1894	Liberal
**Archibald Primrose, Earl of Rosebery**	5 March 1894	25 June 1895	Liberal
**Arthur Balfour (Note: Balfour became Prime Minister on 11 July 1902.)**	25 June 1895	5 December 1905	Conservative
**Henry Campbell-Bannerman**	5 December 1905	3 April 1908	Liberal
**H. H. Asquith**	8 April 1908	5 December 1916	Liberal
**David Lloyd George**	6 December 1916	19 October 1922	Liberal

Thereafter the posts of first lord and prime minister have continually been held by the same person.

== See also ==
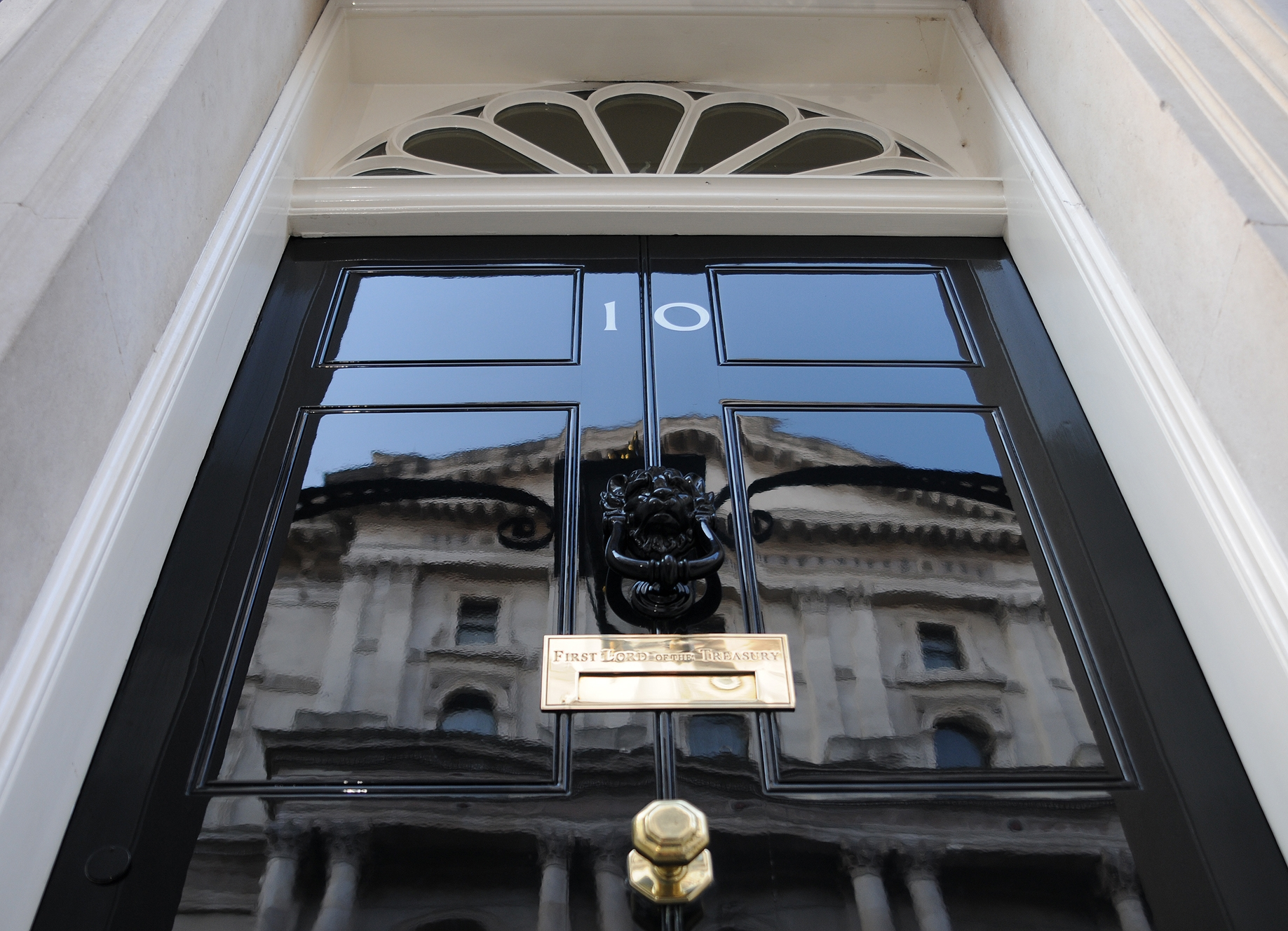
The front door of 10 Downing Street, showing the letter-box inscribed with "First Lord of the Treasury"

- Chief Baron of the Exchequer
- List of lords commissioners of the Treasury
- Minister for the Civil Service, by convention also the Prime Minister
- Secretary to the Treasury

== Notes ==
- Blick, Andrew; Jones, George (7 June 2010), "The power of the Prime Minister", History & Policy, United Kingdom
