= Charlotte Williams-Wynn (aristocrat) =

British aristocrat (d. 1830)

Lady Williams-Wynn
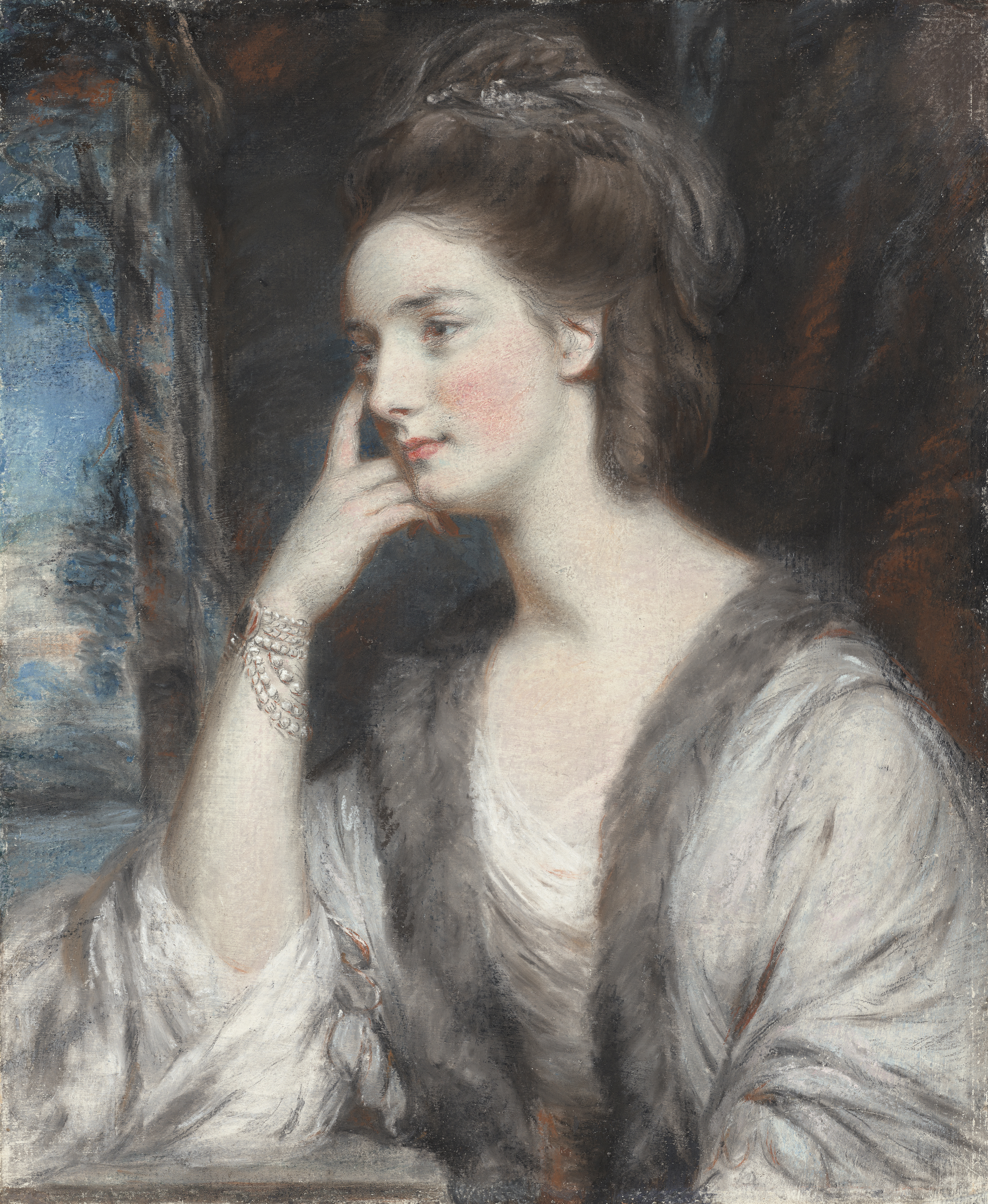
- Charlotte, Lady Watkin Williams-Wynn, by Daniel Gardner, c. 1775
- Born: Charlotte Grenville c. 1754; Llanforda, Oswestry, Shropshire, England
- Died: 29 September 1830
- Spouse: Sir Watkin Williams-Wynn, 4th Baronet (m. 1771; died 1789)
- Children: 8, including Watkin, Charles, and Henry
- Parents: George Grenville; Elizabeth Wyndham
- Relatives: George Nugent-Temple-Grenville, 1st Marquess of Buckingham (brother); Thomas Grenville (brother); William Grenville, 1st Baron Grenville (brother)

Charlotte, Lady Williams-Wynn (née Grenville; c. 1754 – 29 September 1830), was a British aristocrat.

== Early life ==
Williams-Wynn was born in Llanforda, Oswestry. She was the eldest child of the Prime Minister George Grenville and his wife, the former Elizabeth Wyndham, daughter of the Tory statesman Sir William Wyndham, 3rd Baronet. Lady Williams-Wynn was a first cousin of Prime Minister William Pitt through her paternal aunt Hester Grenville, who married William Pitt, 1st Earl of Chatham.

Her mother and father died in 1769 and 1770 respectively, and guardianship of their daughter Charlotte was assumed by George's elder brother, Richard Grenville-Temple, 2nd Earl Temple.

== Personal life ==
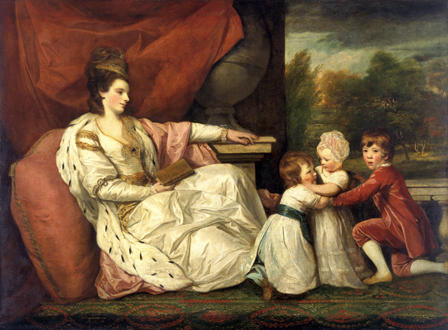
Portrait of Lady Williams-Wynn and her children in 1778, by Joshua Reynolds

On 21 December 1771, she married, as his second wife, Sir Watkin Williams-Wynn, 4th Baronet, and became known as Lady Williams-Wynn. Sir Watkin was the eldest son of Sir Watkin Williams-Wynn, 3rd Baronet, and his second wife, the former Frances Shackerley of Cheshire. The couple had eight children, six of whom survived to adulthood, including:

- Sir Watkin Williams-Wynn, 5th Baronet (1772–1840), who married Lady Henrietta Antonia Clive, eldest daughter of Edward Clive, 1st Earl of Powis and Henrietta Clive, Countess of Powis, in 1817.
- Frances Williams-Wynn (1773-1857), who remained unmarried, and whose political Diaries were published posthumously in 1864.
- Charlotte Williams-Wynn (1775–1819), who married Lt-Col William Shipley, MP for Flint Boroughs and St Mawes, and son of Very Rev. William Davies Shipley.
- Charles Williams-Wynn (1775–1850), who married Mary Cunliffe, daughter of Sir Foster Cunliffe, 3rd Baronet and Harriet Kinloch, in 1806.
- Henrietta Elizabeth Williams-Wynn (1780–1852), who married Thomas Cholmondeley, 1st Baron Delamere of Vale Royal.
- Sir Henry Williams-Wynn (1783–1856), who married Hon. Hester Frances Smith, daughter of Robert Smith, 1st Baron Carrington, in 1813.

Sir Watkin died on 24 July 1789. Upon her husband's death, Lady Williams-Wynn became the sole administrator of his Welsh estates under the terms of his will, and functioned as such until her eldest son reached the age of majority. She lived her final years in Upper Brook Street, Mayfair, with her youngest daughter, Lady Delamere.
