= Sir John Aubrey, 6th Baronet =

British politician

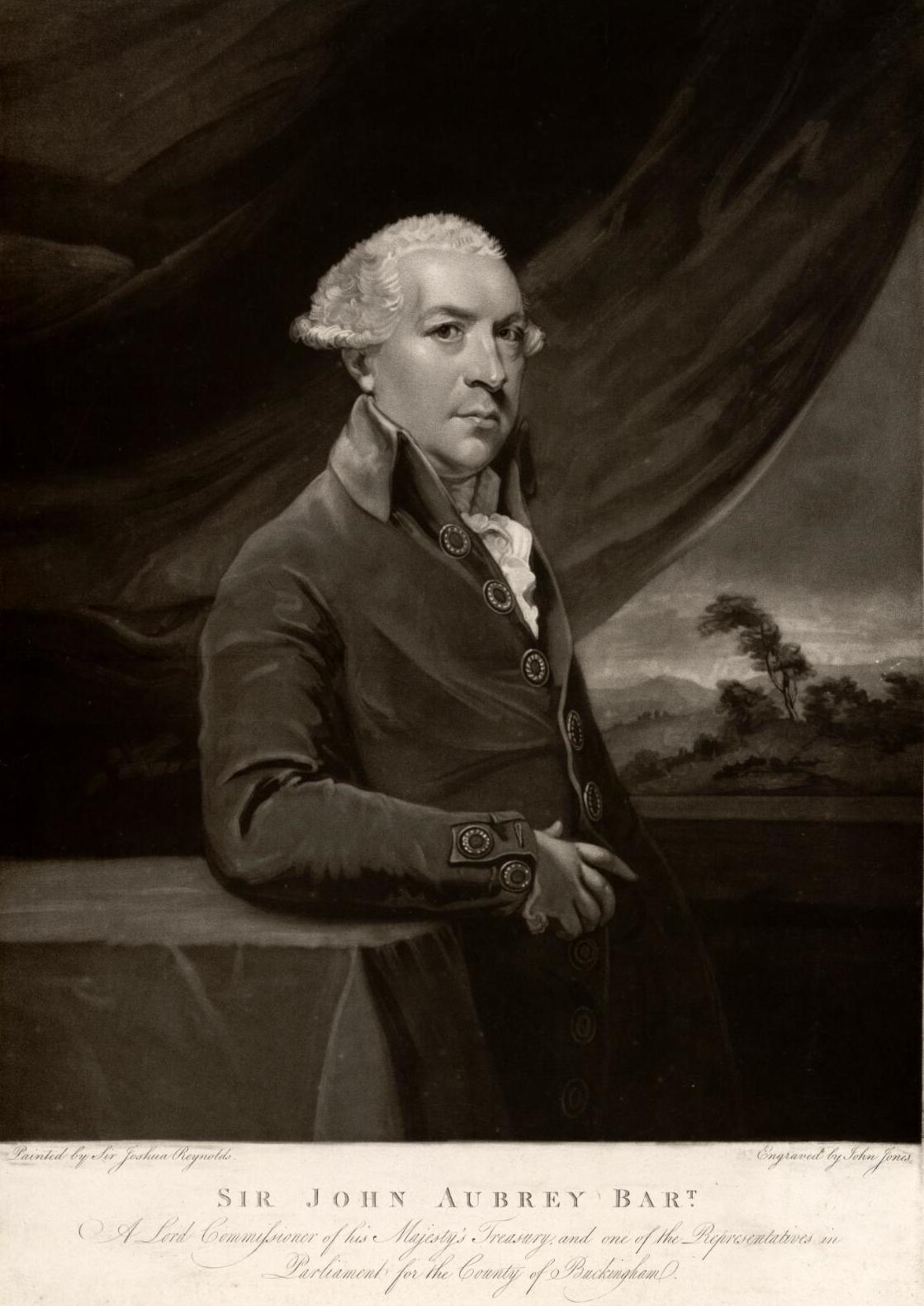
- Portrait of Sir John Aubrey

Member of Parliament for Horsham
- In office 1820–1826

Member of Parliament for Steyning
- In office 1812–1820

Member of Parliament for Aldeburgh
- In office 1796–1812

Member of Parliament for Clitheroe
- In office 1790–1796

Lord of the Treasury
- In office 1783–1789

Lord Commissioner of the Admiralty
- In office 1782–?

Member of Parliament for Buckinghamshire
- In office 1784–1790

Member of Parliament for Wallingford
- In office 1768-1774; 1780-1784

Member of Parliament for Aylesbury
- In office 1774–1780

Personal details
- Born: 4 June 1739 Buckinghamshire, England
- Died: 14 March 1826 (aged 86) Buckinghamshire, England
- Party: Tory
- Spouse(s): Mary Colebroke (m. 1771); Martha Catherine Carter
- Children: 2
- Education: Christ Church, Oxford

Sir John Aubrey, 6th Baronet (4 June 1739 – 14 March 1826) was a British Tory politician. In 1786, he succeeded to his father's baronetcy.

== Biography ==
Baptised in Boarstall in Buckinghamshire on 2 July 1739, he was the son of Sir Thomas Aubrey, 5th Baronet and Martha, daughter of Richard Carter, of Chilton, Buckinghamshire, Chief Justice of Glamorgan. Aubrey was educated at Westminster School and at Christ Church, Oxford, where he graduated as a Doctor of Civil Laws in 1763. Aubrey was Lord Commissioner of the Admiralty in 1782 and Lord of the Treasury from 1783 to 1789.

Between 1768 and 1774 and between 1780 and 1784, Aubrey was Member of Parliament (MP) for Wallingford. He was further MP for Aylesbury from 1774 to 1780, for Buckinghamshire from 1784 to 1790 and for Clitheroe from 1790 to 1796. Aubrey was also Member of Parliament for Aldeburgh from 1796 to 1812, for Steyning from 1812 to 1820 and for Horsham from 1820 to 1826, eventually becoming the Father of the House as the longest-serving member. He died in Dorton House in Buckinghamshire and was buried in Boarstall. He was succeeded by his nephew Thomas Aubrey.

On 9 March 1771, he married firstly Mary Colebrooke, daughter of Sir James Colebrooke, 1st Baronet and Mary Skynner, and on 26 May 1783 secondly his cousin Martha Catherine (d. 1815), daughter of George Richard Carter, of Chilton, Buckinghamshire, and a descendant, through her mother, Julia (née Spilman), of the Willys baronets. By his first wife, he had a son, John (1771-1777), who died of accidental poisoning; he also had an illegitimate daughter, Mary, who married Samuel Whitcombe, of Hempstead Court, Gloucestershire.

== Arms ==
Coat of arms of Sir John Aubrey, 6th Baronet
Crest An eagle's head erased or. Escutcheon Azure, a chevron between three eagles’ heads, erased, or. Motto Solem fero (I will bear the sun)

Parliament of Great Britain
Preceded by Sir George Pigot, Bt; Sir John Gibbons, Bt	Member of Parliament for Wallingford; 1768–1774; With: Robert Pigot 1768–1772; John Cator 1772–1774	Succeeded by John Cator; Sir Robert Barker
Preceded by John Durand; Anthony Bacon	Member of Parliament for Aylesbury; 1774–1780; With: Anthony Bacon	Succeeded by Anthony Bacon; Thomas Orde
Preceded by John Cator; Sir Robert Barker, Bt	Member of Parliament for Wallingford; 1780–1784; With: Chaloner Arcedeckne	Succeeded by Sir Francis Sykes, Bt; Chaloner Arcedeckne
Preceded by Thomas Grenville; The Earl Verney	Member of Parliament for Buckinghamshire; 1784–1790; With: William Grenville	Succeeded by William Grenville; The Earl Verney
Preceded by Thomas Lister; John Lee	Member of Parliament for Clitheroe; 1790–1796; With: Penn Curzon 1790–1792; Assheton Curzon 1792–1794; Richard Erle-Drax-Grosvenor 1794–1796	Succeeded by Lord Edward Bentinck; Hon. Robert Curzon
Preceded by George Grey; John Lee	Member of Parliament for Aldeburgh; 1796–1801; With: Michael Angelo Taylor 1796–1800; George Johnstone 1800–1801	Succeeded by Parliament of the United Kingdom
Parliament of the United Kingdom
Preceded by Parliament of Great Britain	Member of Parliament for Aldeburgh; 1801–1812; With: George Johnstone 1801–1802; John McMahon 1802–1812; Sandford Graham 1812	Succeeded by Andrew Strahan; James Blackwood
Preceded by James Martin Lloyd; Robert Hurst	Member of Parliament for Steyning; 1812–1820; With: James Martin Lloyd 1812–1818; George Philips 1818–1820	Succeeded by George Richard Philips; Lord Henry Howard-Molyneux-Howard
Preceded by George Richard Phillips; Robert Hurst	Member of Parliament for Horsham; 1820–1826; With: Robert Hurst	Succeeded by Henry Edward Fox; Robert Hurst
Preceded by Clement Tudway	Father of the House; 1815–1826	Succeeded by Samuel Smith
Baronetage of England
Preceded by Thomas Aubrey	Baronet (of Llantrithead); 1786–1826	Succeeded by Thomas Aubrey
