= Cobhamites =

18th-century British political faction

- Leader: Lord Cobham (1730s–1749); William Pitt & George Grenville (1749–1761)
- Founder: Lord Cobham
- Founded: 1730s
- Dissolved: 1761; 264 years ago
- Succeeded by: Pittites & Grenvillites
- Ideology: Whiggism
- National affiliation: Whigs

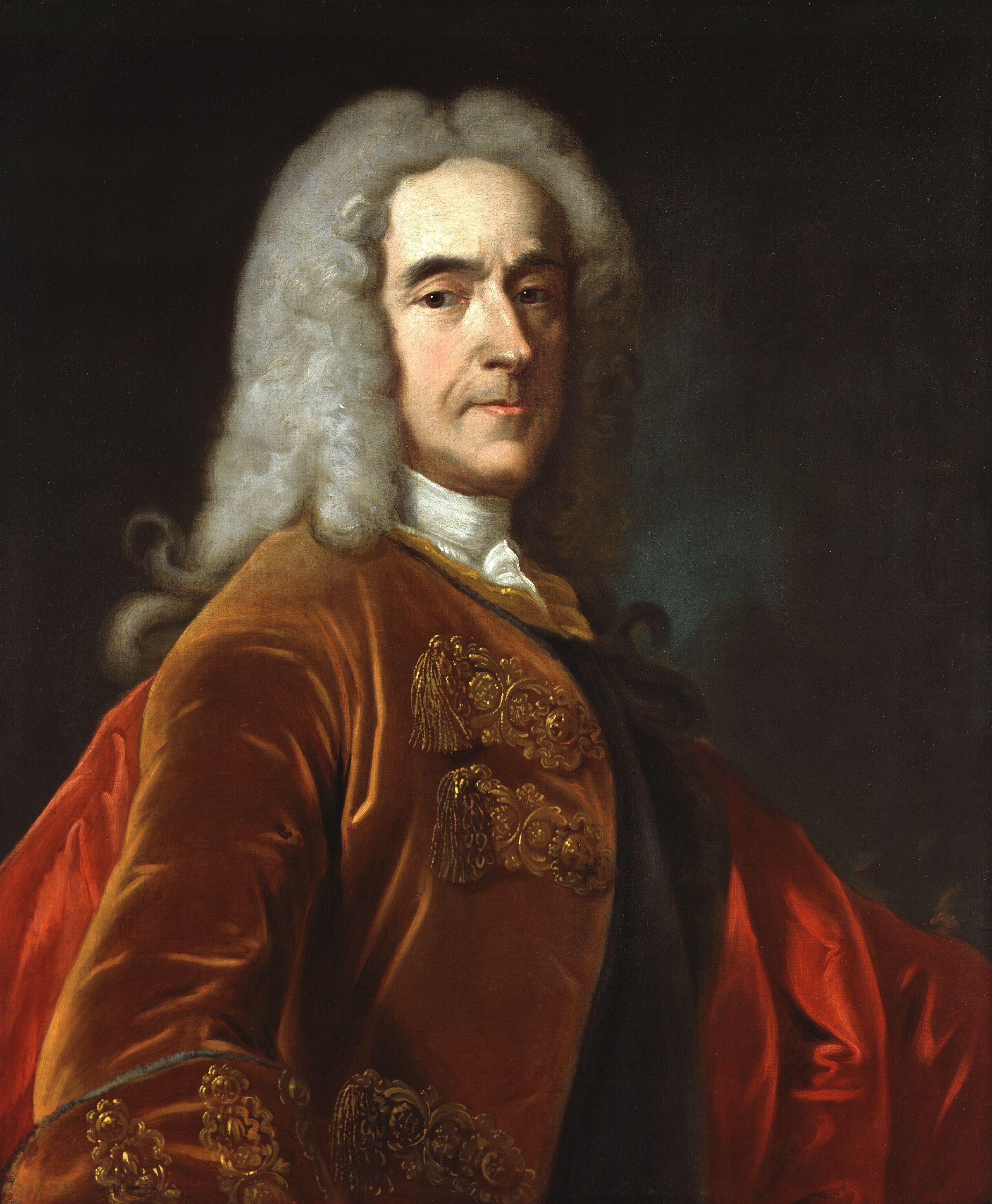
Lord Cobham, the founder and the patron of the group

The Cobhamite faction (often known as Cobham's Cubs) were an 18th-century British political faction built around Richard Temple, 1st Viscount Cobham and his supporters. Among its members, the group included the future Prime Ministers William Pitt and George Grenville. They had a general Whig philosophy and were at first supporters of Prime Minister Sir Robert Walpole but later became opponents of his administration.

== Background ==
The group emerged during the breakdown of the two-party system in Britain when the dominant Whig party had split into several factions - many of whom were in opposition to their fellow Whigs who were in government. Lord Cobham had originally been a supporter of Sir Robert Walpole when he became Prime Minister in 1721, voting with the government in the House of Lords.

== Emergence ==
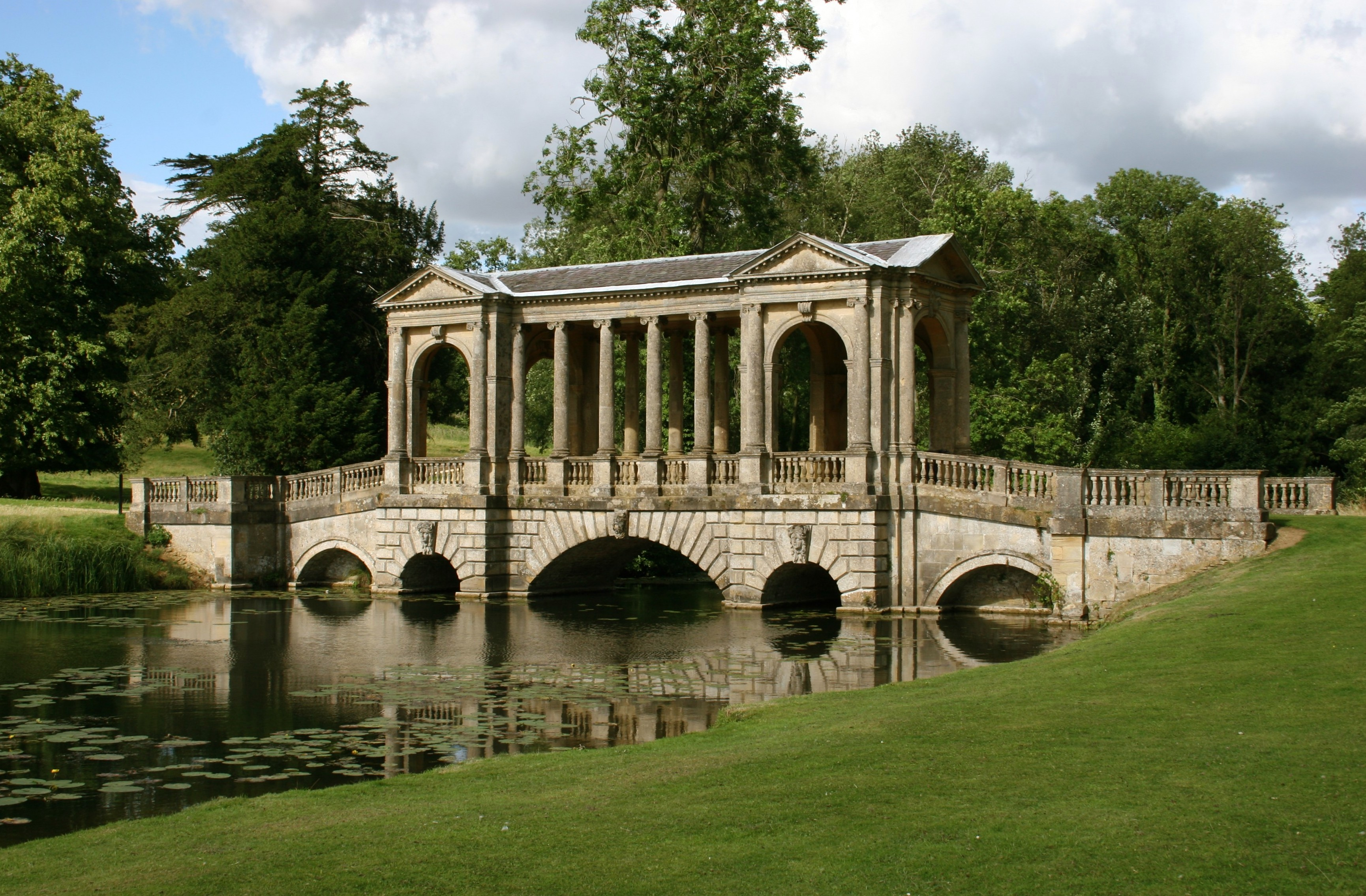
The members often met at Stowe House, Cobham's country estate.

In 1730s he had begun to grow gradually disenchanted with Walpole, coming to a head when he opposed a proposed Excise Bill in 1733 forcing Walpole to withdraw the Bill. Walpole punished him by removing Cobham's command of his regiment. This prompted Cobham to break entirely from his support of Walpole, and he now crossed to join the Opposition. He began to gather a group of supporters around him, often holding their meetings at Cobham's famous estate at Stowe House in Buckinghamshire. They were a mixture of MPs, Peers as well as some prospective politicians. The writer Alexander Pope was associated with the group.

Although almost exclusively made up of Whigs, the group worked closely with the Tories who made up the bulk of the Opposition, and shared Cobham's sharp dislike of the Walpole government. Cobham's supporters and the other Whigs refused to become Tories, and were soon styling themselves as the 'Patriot Party' or 'Patriot Whigs'. The group was at times associated with Frederick, Prince of Wales a noted opponent of Walpole and his father, the King. The Cobham members would often pay court to Frederick at Leicester House.

Walpole outraged them further by dismissing all those who held army commissions and had spoken out against him - which they considered an abuse of his powers. The group now set about attacking Walpole in an attempt to force him from office. They joined forces with the Tory leader Sir William Wyndham, known for his Jacobite sympathies. His daughter Elizabeth later married George Grenville.

== Membership ==
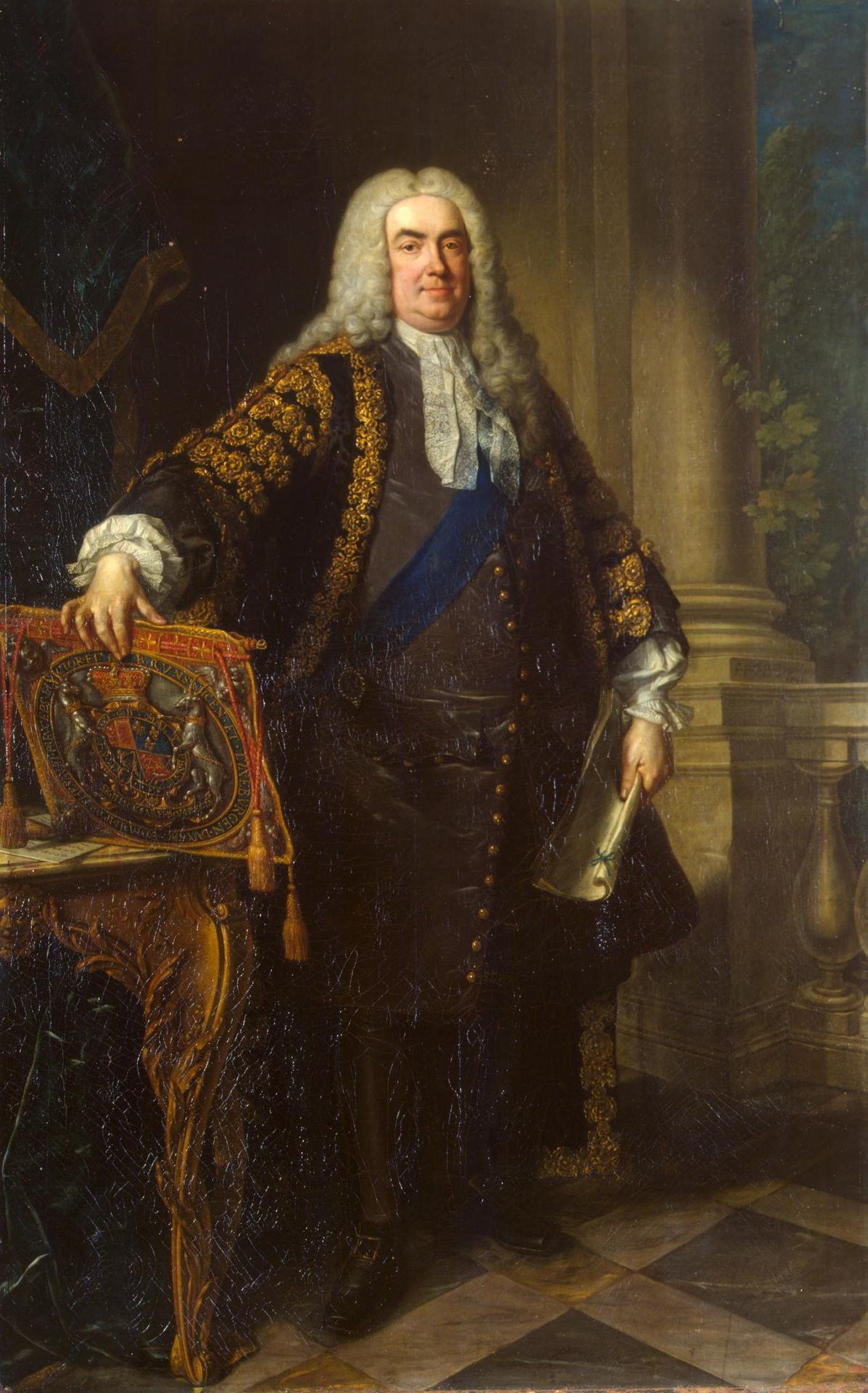
The group was built around its opposition to Sir Robert Walpole, Prime Minister from 1721 to 1742.

The first of the younger generation to gain notoriety was William Pitt who was elected to Parliament in 1735. His elder brother Thomas Pitt for a while also sat with the group, but later broke with them. Other prominent members included Richard Grenville, George Grenville, Robert Nedham and George Lyttelton- many of whom were related to each other either by blood or by marriage. Because of their youth they were popularly known as Cobham's Cubs.

== Opposition ==
Pitt made a series of attacks on Walpole in Parliament, which slowly helped to erode the Prime Minister's authority. Most distressing to the group was the Prime Minister's poor handling of the War of Jenkins' Ear which had broken out in 1739. Walpole was distinctly anti-war and had only reluctantly prosecuted the war - a fact that outraged the pro-war Patriot faction who pushed for his dismissal. Walpole was finally forced into resignation in the wake of the disastrous Siege of Cartagena and only winning a narrow majority in the 1741 general election.

Having helped to bring Walpole down in 1742 with their fierce attacks on his mishandling of the war with Spain, the group were equally opposed to the government that followed it, headed officially by Lord Wilmington but in fact led by Lord Carteret. They attacked him, also for his strategic control of the war which they felt placed too much emphasis on fighting in Germany and not enough in waging war with Spain in the Americas. In 1744 they played a part in the end of Carteret's government, to be replaced one led by Henry Pelham and his brother the Duke of Newcastle.

== Entry into Government ==
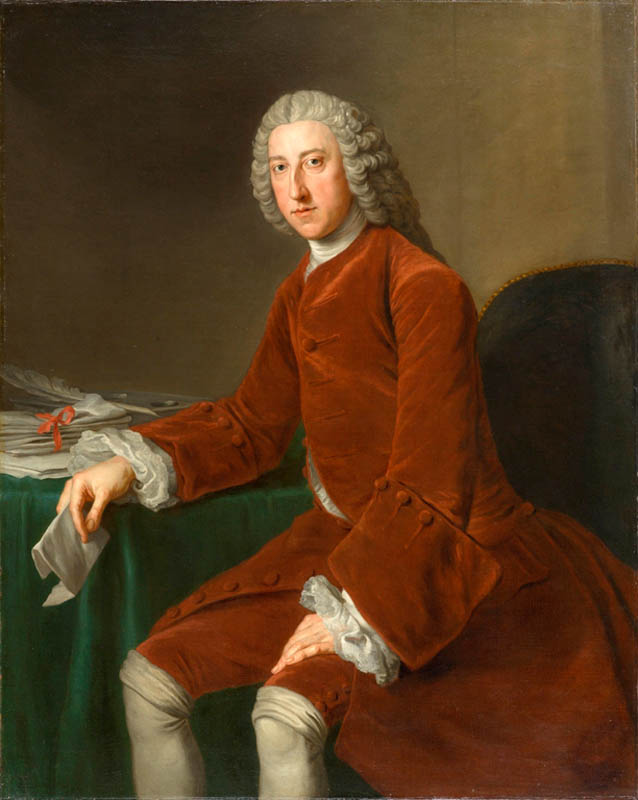
William Pitt was the best known member of the faction and he largely assumed its leadership after 1749.

A large number of Cobham's supporters then went to join the new government. Despite having orchestrated the deal, Pitt didn't take a post in the administration almost because King George II disliked him due to repeated criticisms Pitt had made of Hanover. Pitt and the remaining Cobhamites continued to give the government their support for the next few years, and Pitt was finally rewarded by being given the job of Paymaster of the Forces which did not require regular contact with the King.

By the 1750s the group became distinctly displeased with the policies pursued by the Pelhams, and in 1755 they opposed and attacked a government measure regarding a Treaty with Russia, leading to Grenville and Pitt being dismissed and returning to opposition where they continued to attack the Newcastle government.

In 1749 Cobham had died, and the cohesiveness of the group was threatened by the fact that some of his followers were still in government while others were in opposition. Pitt and George Grenville emerged as the effective leaders of the party - which continued to meet at Stowe. In 1756 Pitt led the group into government once more where they were known as the 'Ministry of Cousins' because so many were related. The group then participated in the Pitt–Newcastle ministry which guided Britain to victory in the Seven Years' War.

== Later Split ==
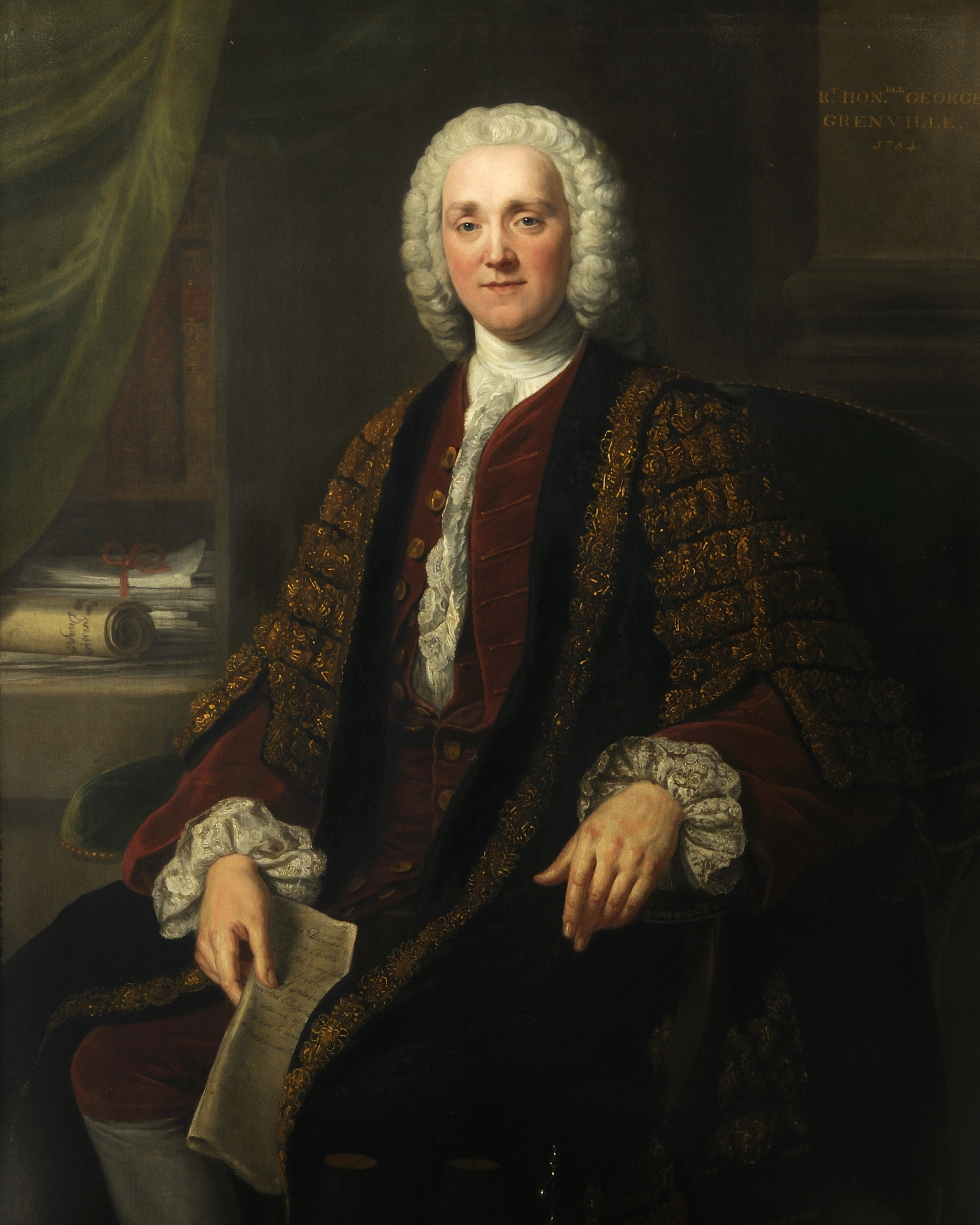
George Grenville led one of the two factions born out of the Cobhamite party, and served as Prime Minister between 1763 and 1765

In October 1761 annoyed at the growing influence of Lord Bute in the cabinet, and frustrated by his colleagues' refusal to launch a pre-emptive attack on Spain, Pitt resigned. While some of the group followed him, George Grenville remained in cabinet with the rest of the old Cobhamite party - this led to a degree of bad-feeling and the break-up of what had been a cohesive group for nearly thirty years.

Even after the war was concluded with the Peace of Paris in 1763 the split continued with some joining the Grenvillite party that held office in 1763 with George Grenville as Prime Minister, while others joined Pitt in opposition. This switched over in 1766 when Pitt became First Minister, and Grenville led his own followers into opposition. The two groups held strikingly opposing views on the issue of America, with Grenville and his supporters holding hawkish views while Pitt preferred conciliation. Pitt and Grenville were eventually able to agree to reconciliation before the latter's death in 1770.

The sons of Pitt and Grenville and many of their supporters were to form a Pittite party in the 1780s which dominated British politics for a generation.

== Prominent members ==
- Richard Temple, 1st Viscount Cobham
- William Pitt, 1st Earl of Chatham
- George Grenville
- Richard Grenville-Temple, 2nd Earl Temple
- Thomas Grenville
- Thomas Pitt
- George Lyttelton, 1st Baron Lyttelton

== Bibliography ==
- Black, Jeremy. Pitt the Elder. Cambridge University Press, 1992.
- Brown, Peter Douglas. William Pitt, Earl of Chatham: The Great Commoner. Allen & Unwin, 1978.

== See also ==
- Kingdom of Great Britain § Patronage and corruption
- Grenvillite
- Pittite
- Bedfordite
- Rockingham Whigs
