= Robert Hurst (1750–1843) =

English Whig politician

Robert Hurst (1750 – 13 April 1843) was an English Whig politician. He was Member of Parliament (MP) for boroughs from 1806 to 1829.

== Political career ==
At the 1802 general election, Hurst was elected to the House of Commons for two constituencies: Shaftesbury and Steyning. The result of the election in Shaftesbury was disputed, but once the dispute had been settled in his favour he chose to represent Shaftesbury, and did not sit for Steyning in the remainder of the Parliament.

At the 1806 general election he was returned again for Steyning, and held that seat until the 1812 general election, when he was elected as MP for Horsham, a seat which he held until 1829, when he resigned his seat by taking the Chiltern Hundreds.

== Family ==
Hurst married in 1784 Maria Smith, daughter of Adam Smith: they had two sons and five daughters. The eldest son, Robert Henry Hurst, represented Horsham as a Radical.

Parliament of the United Kingdom
Preceded by James Martin Lloyd and John Henniker-Major	Member of Parliament for Steyning; 1802–1803; With: James Martin Lloyd	Succeeded by James Martin Lloyd and Lord Ossulston
Preceded by Walter Boyd and Paul Benfield	Member of Parliament for Shaftesbury; 1802–1806; With: Edward Loveden Loveden	Succeeded by Edward Loveden Loveden and Home Riggs Popham
Preceded by Lord Ossulston; James Martin Lloyd	Member of Parliament for Steyning; 1806–1812; With: James Martin Lloyd	Succeeded by Sir John Aubrey, Bt; James Martin Lloyd
Preceded by Joseph Marryat and Henry Goulburn	Member of Parliament for Horsham; 1812–1829; With: Arthur Leary Piggott 1812–1818; George Richard Phillips 1818–1820; Sir John Aubrey, Bt 1820–1826; Henry Fox 1826–1827; Nicholas Ridley-Colborne from 1826	Succeeded by Nicholas Ridley-Colborne and The Earl of Arundel
