= Thomas Grenville =

18th/19th-century British politician

The Right Honourable Thomas Grenville
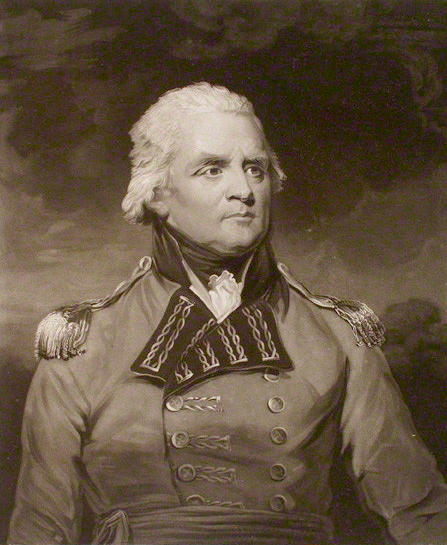
- Thomas Grenville (picture)

President of the Board of Control
- In office 1806–1806
- Monarch: George III
- Prime Minister: The Lord Grenville
- Preceded by: The Earl of Minto
- Succeeded by: George Tierney

First Lord of the Admiralty
- In office 1806–1807
- Monarch: George III
- Prime Minister: The Lord Grenville
- Preceded by: The Earl Grey
- Succeeded by: The Earl of Mulgrave

Member of Parliament for Buckinghamshire
- In office 1779–1784
- Preceded by: The Earl Verney; The Marquess of Buckingham
- Succeeded by: The Lord Grenville; Sir John Aubrey, 6th Baronet

Member of Parliament for Aldeburgh
- In office 1790–1796
- Preceded by: William Champion Crespigny; Samuel Salt
- Succeeded by: Sir John Aubrey, 6th Baronet; Michael Angelo Taylor

Member of Parliament for Buckingham
- In office 1796–1801
- Preceded by: Sir George Nugent, 1st Baronet; The Lord Bridport
- Succeeded by: Parliament of the United Kingdom
- In office 1813–1818
- Preceded by: Parliament of Great Britain
- Succeeded by: The Lord Braybrooke; The Lord Nugent

Member of Parliament for Buckinghamshire
- In office 1813–1818
- Preceded by: The Duke of Buckingham and Chandos; William Selby Lowndes
- Succeeded by: William Selby Lowndes; The Duke of Buckingham and Chandos

British Minister to France
- In office 1782–1782
- Preceded by: Vacant due to American Revolutionary War Title last held by The Earl of Mansfield
- Succeeded by: The Lord St Helens

Justice in Eyre south of the Trent
- In office 1800–1846
- Preceded by: The Lord Sydney
- Succeeded by: Office abolished

Personal details
- Born: 31 December 1755 Wotton Underwood, Buckinghamshire, England
- Died: 17 December 1846 (aged 90) Piccadilly, London, England
- Party: Whig
- Parents: George Grenville; Elizabeth Wyndham
- Relatives: George Nugent-Temple-Grenville, 1st Marquess of Buckingham (brother); Charlotte Williams-Wynn (sister); William Grenville, 1st Baron Grenville (brother)
- Education: Eton College

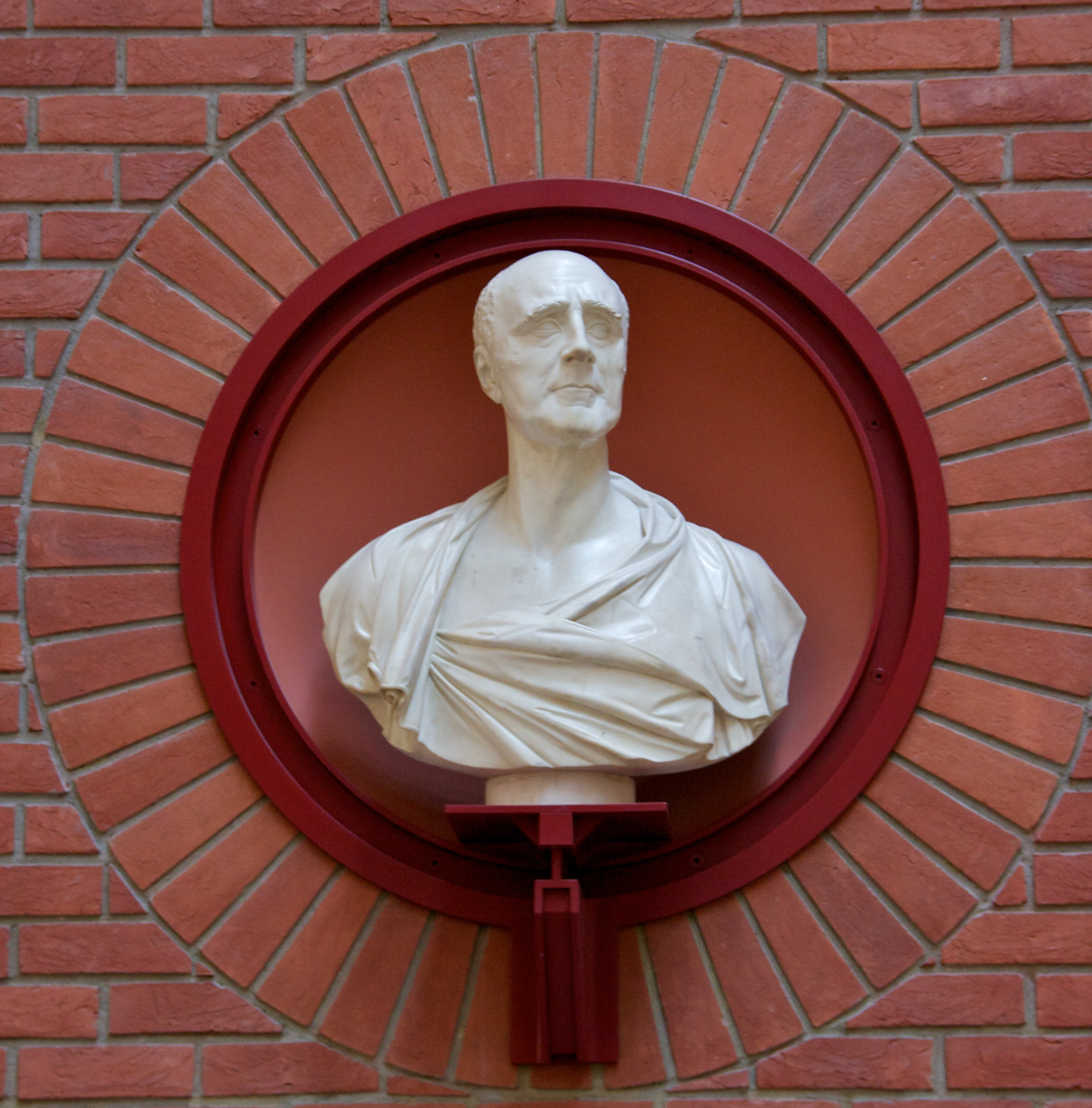
Thomas Grenville by Giovanni Battista Comolli, British Library, London

The arms of Thomas Grenville (Vert on a cross argent five torteaux, a crescent for difference) are the arms of the Grenville family, with a crescent as a mark of cadency, to signify him as the second son.

Thomas Grenville PC (31 December 1755 – 17 December 1846) was a British politician and bibliophile.

== Background and education ==
Grenville was the second son of Prime Minister George Grenville and Elizabeth Wyndham, daughter of Sir William Wyndham, 3rd Baronet. George Nugent-Temple-Grenville, 1st Marquess of Buckingham, was his elder brother and William Grenville, 1st Baron Grenville, his younger brother. He was educated at Eton.

== Career ==
In 1778, he was commissioned ensign in the Coldstream Guards and in 1779 promoted a lieutenant in the 80th Regiment of Foot, but resigned his commission in 1780. He was, with one interval, a member of parliament from 1780 to 1810, and for a few months during 1806 and 1807 President of the Board of Control (1806) and then First Lord of the Admiralty (1806–1807). In 1798, he was sworn of the Privy Council.

On 1 February 1799 Grenville and a party were travelling on HMS Proserpine when she was wrecked near Scharhörn off the Elbe. She was trying to deliver Grenville and his party to Cuxhaven, from where they were to proceed on a diplomatic mission to meet Frederick William III of Prussia in Berlin during the War of the Second Coalition. Proserpine was stuck in ice in worsening weather. At 1:30, on 2 February, all 187 persons on Proserpine left her and started the six-mile walk to the island Neuwerk, in freezing weather and falling snow. Seven seamen, a boy, four Royal Marines, and one woman and her child died; the rest made it to safety in the tower of Neuwerk. The diplomatic party reached Cuxhaven on 6 February to continue to Berlin via Hamburg and return to London on 23 March.

== Library ==
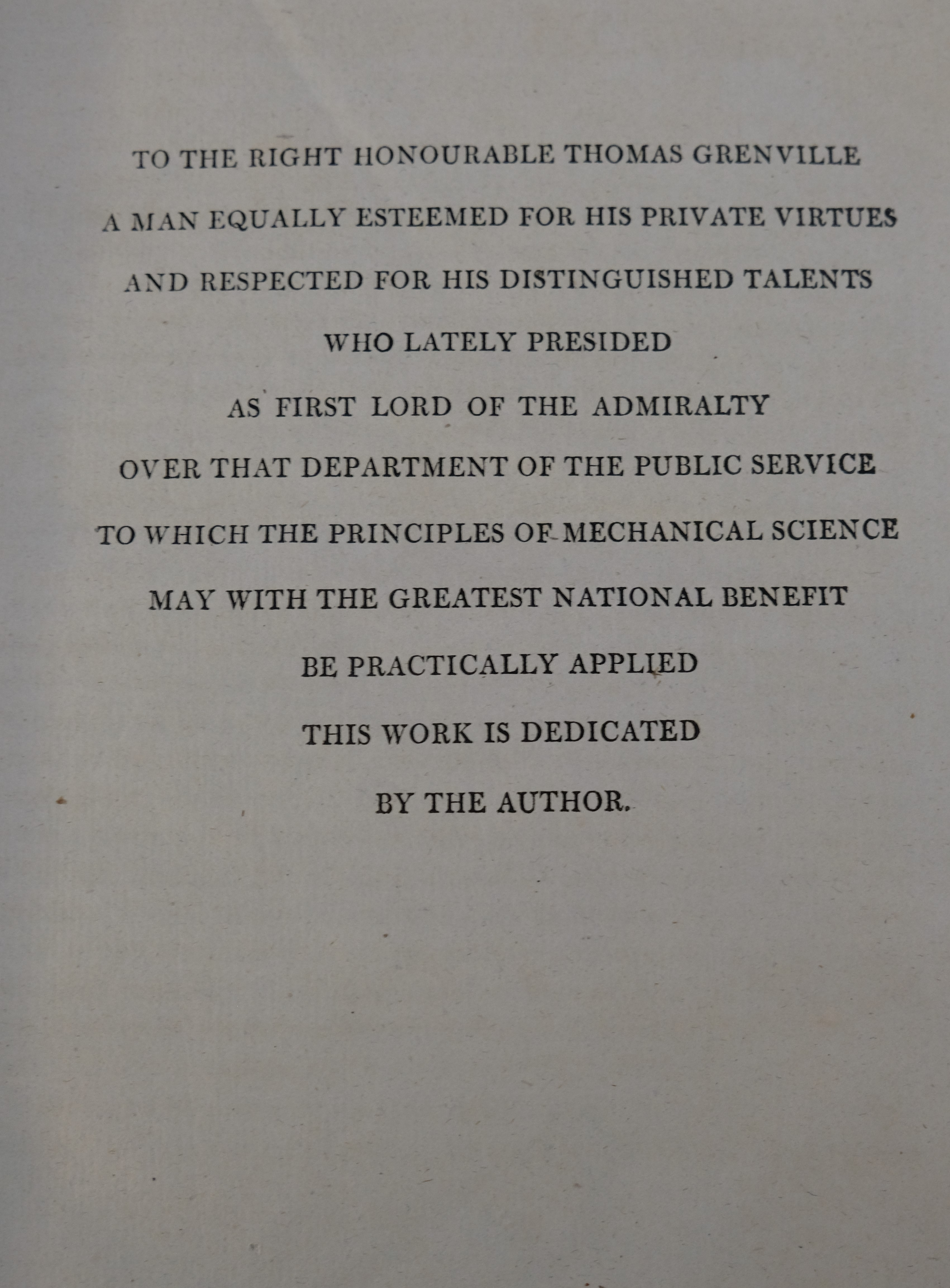
Dedication to Grenville in volume I of A Course of Lectures on Natural Philosophy and the Mechanical Arts, by Thomas Young (1807)

He began collecting books from at least his early twenties, and by his death had amassed 20,240 volumes containing 16,000 titles. The collection is notable for its many editions of Homer, Aesop and Ariosto, for early travel books, and for literature in the Romance languages. Rare volumes include a vellum copy of the Gutenberg Bible, which Grenville bought in France in 1817 for 6,260 francs, a Mainz Psalter and a Shakespeare First Folio. There are also 59 manuscripts. Grenville liked his books to be in excellent condition, and would often have books washed or rebound, as well as seeking out relevant pages to add to any incomplete copies he owned. His library includes fine bindings by eminent bookbinders such as Jean Grolier de Servieres, Jacque Auguste de Thou and Count Charles Henry Hoym (1694-1736). Grenville also collected ephemeral material such as ballads, chapbooks, bills, petitions, broadsides and tracts relating to British and Irish affairs.He lent books widely, Barry Taylor describing his library as apparently "semi-public". He bequeathed the collection to the British Museum, of which he had become a trustee in 1830, and it is now housed in the King's Library Tower in the British Library.

== Personal life ==
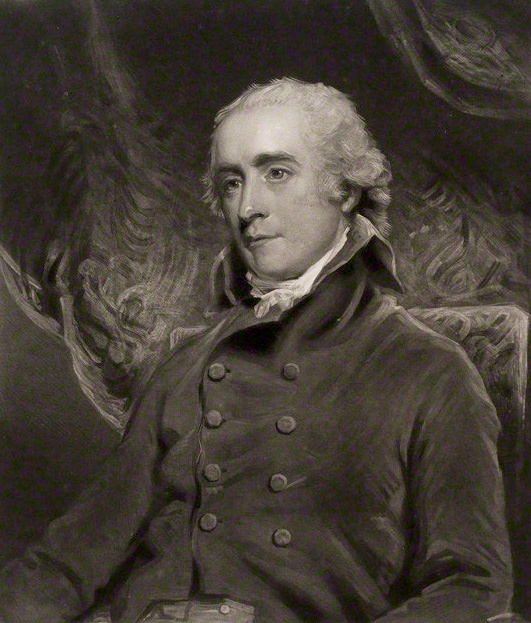
Thomas Grenville

Grenville died at Piccadilly, London, in December 1846, aged 90. He never married.

== Citations ==
Parliament of Great Britain
| Preceded by The Earl Verney; George Grenville | Member of Parliament for Buckinghamshire; 1779–1784; With: The Earl Verney | Succeeded by Sir John Aubrey, 6th Bt; William Grenville |
| Preceded by William Champion Crespigny; Samuel Salt | Member of Parliament for Aldeburgh; 1790–1796; With: Lord Grey of Groby | Succeeded by Sir John Aubrey, 6th Bt; Michael Angelo Taylor |
| Preceded by George Nugent; The Lord Bridport | Member of Parliament for Buckingham; 1796–1801; With: George Nugent | Succeeded by Parliament of the United Kingdom |
Parliament of the United Kingdom
| Preceded by Parliament of Great Britain | Member of Parliament for Buckingham; 1801–1810; With: George Nugent 1801–1802; Lord William Proby 1802–1804; Lord Carysfort 1805–1806; Earl Percy 1806; Sir William Young, 2nd Bt 1806–1807; Sir John Borlase Warren, 1st Bt 1807; Richard Griffin 1807–1810 | Succeeded by Richard Griffin; Lord George Grenville |
| Preceded by Earl Temple; William Selby Lowndes | Member of Parliament for Buckinghamshire; 1813–1818; With: William Selby Lowndes | Succeeded by William Selby Lowndes; Earl Temple |
Diplomatic posts
| Vacant due to American Revolutionary War Title last held by The Viscount Stormont | British Minister to France; 1782 | Succeeded by Alleyne FitzHerbert |
Political offices
| Preceded by The Lord Minto | President of the Board of Control; 1806 | Succeeded by George Tierney |
| Preceded by Viscount Howick | First Lord of the Admiralty; 1806–1807 | Succeeded by The Lord Mulgrave |
Legal offices
| Preceded by The Viscount Sydney | Justice in Eyre south of the Trent; 1800–1846 | Succeeded by Office Abolished |
