= George Nugent-Temple-Grenville, 1st Marquess of Buckingham =

British politician (1753–1813)

The Most Honourable The Marquess of Buckingham KG KP PC
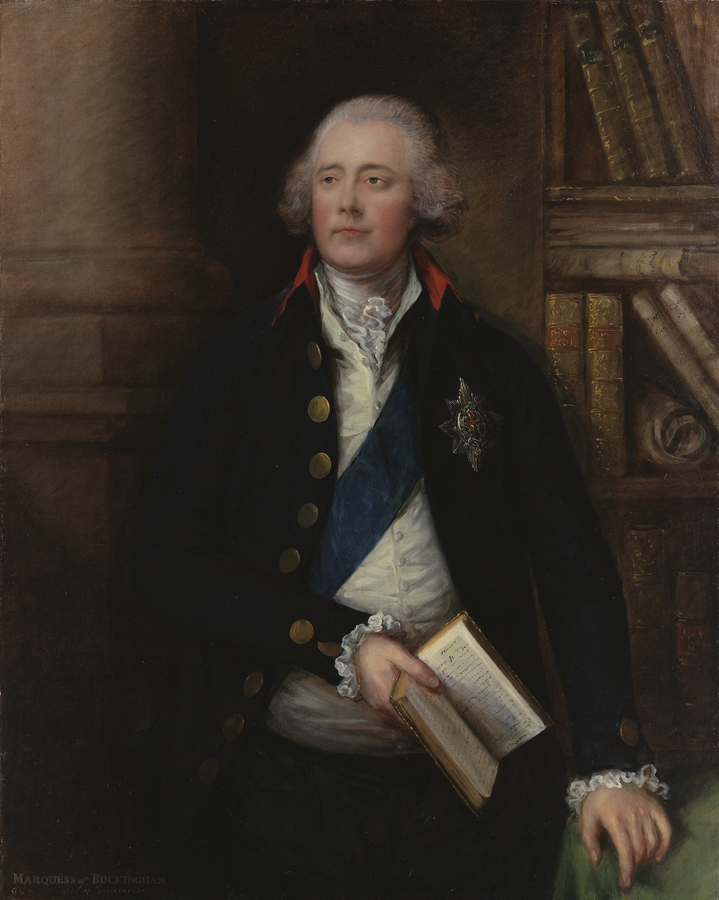
- Portrait by Thomas Gainsborough

Secretary of State for Foreign Affairs
- In office 19 December 1783 – 23 December 1783
- Monarch: George III
- Prime Minister: William Pitt
- Preceded by: Charles James Fox
- Succeeded by: Marquess of Carmarthen

Home Secretary
- In office 19 December 1783 – 23 December 1783
- Monarch: George III
- Prime Minister: William Pitt
- Preceded by: Lord North
- Succeeded by: The Lord Sydney

Lord Lieutenant of Ireland
- In office 27 October 1787 – 24 October 1789
- Monarch: George III
- Prime Minister: William Pitt
- Preceded by: The Duke of Rutland
- Succeeded by: The Earl of Westmorland
- In office 15 August 1782 – 3 May 1783
- Monarch: George III
- Prime Minister: The Earl of Shelburne; The Duke of Portland
- Preceded by: The Duke of Portland
- Succeeded by: The Earl of Northington

Member of Parliament for Buckinghamshire
- In office 1774–1779
- Preceded by: Richard Lowndes
- Succeeded by: Thomas Grenville

Personal details
- Born: George Grenville; 17 June 1753
- Died: 11 February 1813 (aged 59) Stowe, Buckinghamshire, England
- Resting place: Wotton Underwood, Buckinghamshire, England
- Spouse: Hon. Mary Nugent (m. 1775; died 1812)
- Children: Richard Temple-Nugent-Brydges-Chandos-Grenville, 1st Duke of Buckingham and Chandos; George Nugent-Grenville, 2nd Baron Nugent
- Parents: George Grenville; Elizabeth Wyndham
- Relatives: Charlotte Williams-Wynn (sister); Thomas Grenville (brother); William Grenville, 1st Baron Grenville (brother)
- Education: Eton College; Christ Church, Oxford
- Occupation: Statesman

George Nugent-Temple-Grenville, 1st Marquess of Buckingham (17 June 1753 – 11 February 1813), known as George Grenville before 1779 and as the Earl Temple between 1779 and 1784, was a British statesman.

== Background and early life ==
Grenville was the eldest son of George Grenville, Prime Minister of Great Britain, and his wife, the former Elizabeth Wyndham, daughter of Sir William Wyndham, 3rd Baronet. He was the nephew of Richard Grenville-Temple, 2nd Earl Temple (his father's elder brother), and the elder brother of Thomas Grenville and of William Grenville (later 1st Baron Grenville and also Prime Minister of Great Britain). In 1764, he was appointed a Teller of the Exchequer. He was educated at Eton College from 1764 to 1770 and matriculated at Christ Church, Oxford in 1770. In 1774 he undertook a Grand Tour through Italy and Austria. In 1775, he married the Hon. Mary Nugent, daughter of Robert Nugent, 1st Viscount Clare, and the following year his father-in-law Lord Clare was created Earl Nugent, with special remainder (in default of his own heirs male, of which he had none) to his new son-in-law.

== Political career ==
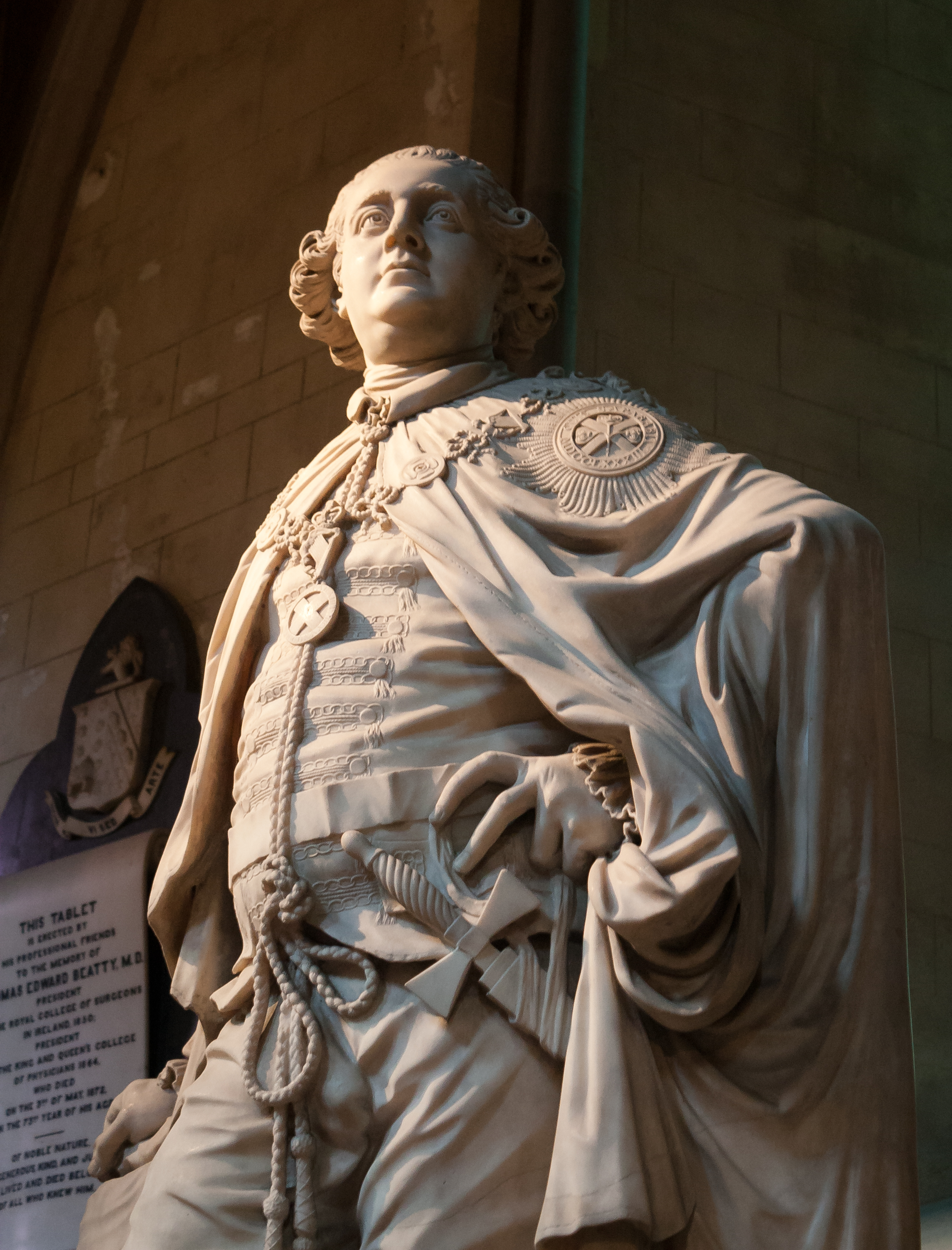
Statue sculpted by Edward Smyth in 1783, showing Buckingham in the robes of a Knight of the Order of St Patrick

Grenville was returned as Member of Parliament for Buckinghamshire at the 1774 general election. In the House of Commons he emerged as a sharp critic of the American policy of Lord North. In September 1779, he succeeded his uncle as 3rd Earl Temple and moved to the House of Lords. The now Lord Temple also took the additional family names Nugent and Temple by Royal Warrant issued on 4 December making the compound family name Nugent-Temple-Grenville.

In 1780 Francis Dashwood, 11th Baron le Despencer as Lord Lieutenant of Buckinghamshire had to choose between the Earl of Chesterfield – a political friend – and Temple to be colonel of the Buckinghamshire Militia. He chose Temple as the better officer, and he became an enthusiastic commander of his regiment. In 1782, Temple himself was appointed Lord Lieutenant of Buckinghamshire and in July 1782, he became a member of the Privy Council and Lord Lieutenant of Ireland in the Ministry of Lord Shelburne. He was instrumental in the enactment of the Renunciation Act 1783 (23 Geo. 3. c. 28), which supplemented the legislative independence granted to Ireland in 1782. As Lord Lieutenant of Ireland, and by royal warrant, he created the Order of St Patrick in February 1783, with himself as the first Grand Master. He left Ireland in 1783 and again turned his attention to English politics. He enjoyed the confidence of King George III, and having opposed Fox's East India Bill, he was authorised by the king to say that "whoever voted for the India Bill was not only not his friend, but would be considered by him as an enemy", a message which ensured the defeat of the bill. He was appointed a Secretary of State when Pitt the Younger (his father's sister's son) formed his ministry in December 1783, but resigned only three days later. This was the shortest cabinet tenure until Michelle Donelan in 2022.

Coat of arms of George Nugent-Temple-Grenville, 1st Marquess of Buckingham, KG, KP, PC

In December 1784, Lord Temple was created Marquess of Buckingham. In November 1787, he was again appointed Lord Lieutenant of Ireland, this time under Pitt, but his second tenure of this office proved less successful than the first. Grattan denounced him for extravagance; the Irish Parliament censured him for refusing to transmit to England an address calling upon the Prince of Wales to assume the regency; and he could only maintain his position by resorting to bribery on a large scale. When his father-in-law died in 1788, Buckingham succeeded him as 2nd Earl Nugent. However, since he already held a marquessate, he was never known by this title. (His wife was, however, created Baroness Nugent in 1800, with special remainder to their second son, Lord George Nugent-Grenville.) Having become very unpopular, he resigned his office in September 1789.

During the Irish rebellion of 1798 Buckingham volunteered his regiment, now the Royal Buckinghamshire Militia (King's Own), for service there, and after the necessary legislation had passed he led it there as one of the first English militia regiments to serve overseas. Although the regiment took part in Marquess Cornwallis's campaign and a detachment was present at the Battle of Ballinamuck, Buckingham himself had been left in Dublin. He blamed the colonel of the Warwickshire Militia, the Marquess of Hertford for this snub, and the subsequent reluctance of the two regiments to continue serving in Ireland: 'Lord Hertford has allowed the Warwick to run riot and they tainted ours till they found me more sturdy than his lordship', he complained. Buckingham persuaded his men to stay on until April 1799 before returning to England.

== Later years ==
Buckingham subsequently took very little part in politics, although he spoke in favour of the Act of Union of 1800. He handed over command of the Royal Bucks Militia to his eldest son in 1803. His wife died in 1812 and he died on 11 February 1813 at his residence, Stowe in Buckinghamshire. He was buried at his ancestral home Wotton. He left two sons: Richard, Earl Temple (who succeeded him as 2nd Marquess of Buckingham and was later created Duke of Buckingham and Chandos) and George, 2nd Baron Nugent (who had succeeded his mother in that title on her death).

A number of streets on the northside of Dublin are named for him including, Buckingham Street, Temple Street and Grenville Street.

== See also ==
- Grenvillite

Parliament of Great Britain
Preceded by Richard Lowndes; The Earl Verney	Member of Parliament for Buckinghamshire; 1774–1779; With: The Earl Verney	Succeeded by The Earl Verney; Thomas Grenville
Political offices
Preceded by The Earl of Macclesfield	Teller of the Exchequer; 1763–1813	Succeeded by Spencer Perceval
Preceded by The Duke of Portland	Lord Lieutenant of Ireland; 1782–1783	Succeeded by The Earl of Northington
Preceded by Charles James Fox	Foreign Secretary; 1783	Succeeded by The Marquess of Carmarthen
Preceded by Lord North	Home Secretary; 1783	Succeeded by The Lord Sydney
Preceded by The Duke of Portland	Leader of the House of Lords; 1783	Succeeded by The Lord Sydney
Preceded by The Duke of Rutland	Lord Lieutenant of Ireland; 1787–1789	Succeeded by The Earl of Westmorland
Honorary titles
Preceded by The Earl of Chesterfield	Lord Lieutenant of Buckinghamshire; 1782–1813	Succeeded by The Marquess of Buckingham
Peerage of Great Britain
New creation	Marquess of Buckingham; 1784–1813	Succeeded by Richard Grenville
Preceded by Richard Grenville-Temple	Earl Temple; 1779–1813	Succeeded by Richard Grenville
Peerage of Ireland
Preceded by Robert Nugent	Earl Nugent; 1788–1813	Succeeded by Richard Grenville
