= Ralph Verney, 2nd Earl Verney =

British politician

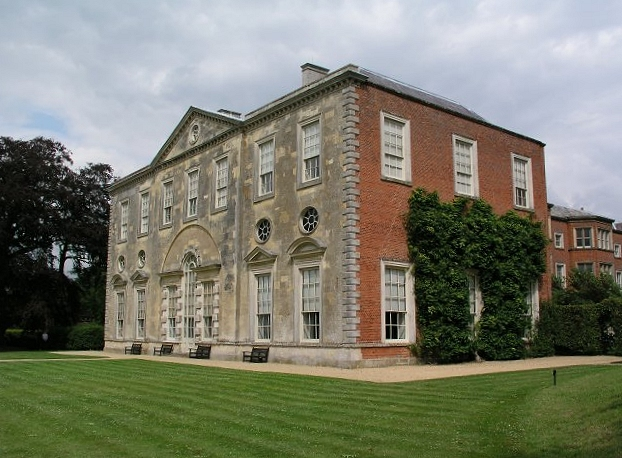
Claydon House

Ralph Verney, 2nd Earl Verney PC, FRS (1 February 1714 – 31 March 1791), was a member of the Verney family of Middle Claydon and a British politician.

From 1737 until 1752, when he succeeded to the earldom, he was styled Lord Fermanagh. He sat in the House of Commons several times between 1753 and 1791.

== Life ==
Verney was born on 1 February 1714, the son of Ralph Verney, the first Earl Verney, of Claydon House, Buckinghamshire; and Catherine, daughter to Henry Paschall of Baddow Hall in Essex.

In 1740 he married Mary, daughter of Henry Herring, a director of the Bank of England. They had no children. She died on 22 January 1791, and Verney died on 31 March of the same year; both were buried in the family vault in the church of Middle Claydon.

He left debts of over £115,000. His various titles were extinguished at his death. His estates were inherited by Mary Verney, the daughter of his elder brother John, who had died in 1737. At the recommendation of William Pitt, she was created Baroness Fermanagh in 1792.

== Politics ==
Verney succeeded his father in the earldom in 1752. However, as this was an Irish peerage, it did not entitle him to a seat in the House of Lords (although it did entitle him to a seat in the Irish House of Lords). He was elected to the House of Commons for Wendover in 1753, a seat he held until 1761. He later represented Carmarthen between 1761 and 1768, and Buckinghamshire from 1768 to 1784 and again from 1790 to 1791. On 22 November 1765 he was appointed to the Privy Council.

He was elected a Fellow of the Royal Society in 1758.

== Claydon House ==
He rebuilt Claydon House in Buckinghamshire between 1757 and 1771. The house today represents only the west wing, which was originally connected to an identical east wing by a colonnaded rotunda surmounted by a cupola. Cost overruns on the building meant that Lord Verney had to spend the final years of his life on the continent to escape his creditors.

Parliament of Great Britain
| Preceded by John Hampden; The Earl Verney | Member of Parliament for Wendover; 1753–1761; With: John Hampden 1753–1754; John Calvert 1754–1761 | Succeeded by Richard Chandler-Cavendish; Verney Lovett |
| Preceded by Griffith Philipps | Member of Parliament for Carmarthen; 1761–1768 | Succeeded by Griffith Philipps |
| Preceded by Richard Lowndes; Sir William Stanhope | Member of Parliament for Buckinghamshire; 1768–1784; With: Richard Lowndes 1768–1774; George Grenville 1774–1779; Thomas Grenville 1779–1784 | Succeeded by William Grenville; Sir John Aubrey, Bt |
| Preceded by William Grenville; Sir John Aubrey, Bt | Member of Parliament for Buckinghamshire; 1790–1791; With: William Grenville 1790; James Grenville 1790–1791 | Succeeded by James Grenville; Marquess of Titchfield |
Peerage of Ireland
| Preceded by Ralph Verney | Earl Verney; 1752–1791 | Extinct |
