= George Grenville =

Prime Minister of Great Britain from 1763 to 1765

The Right Honourable George Grenville
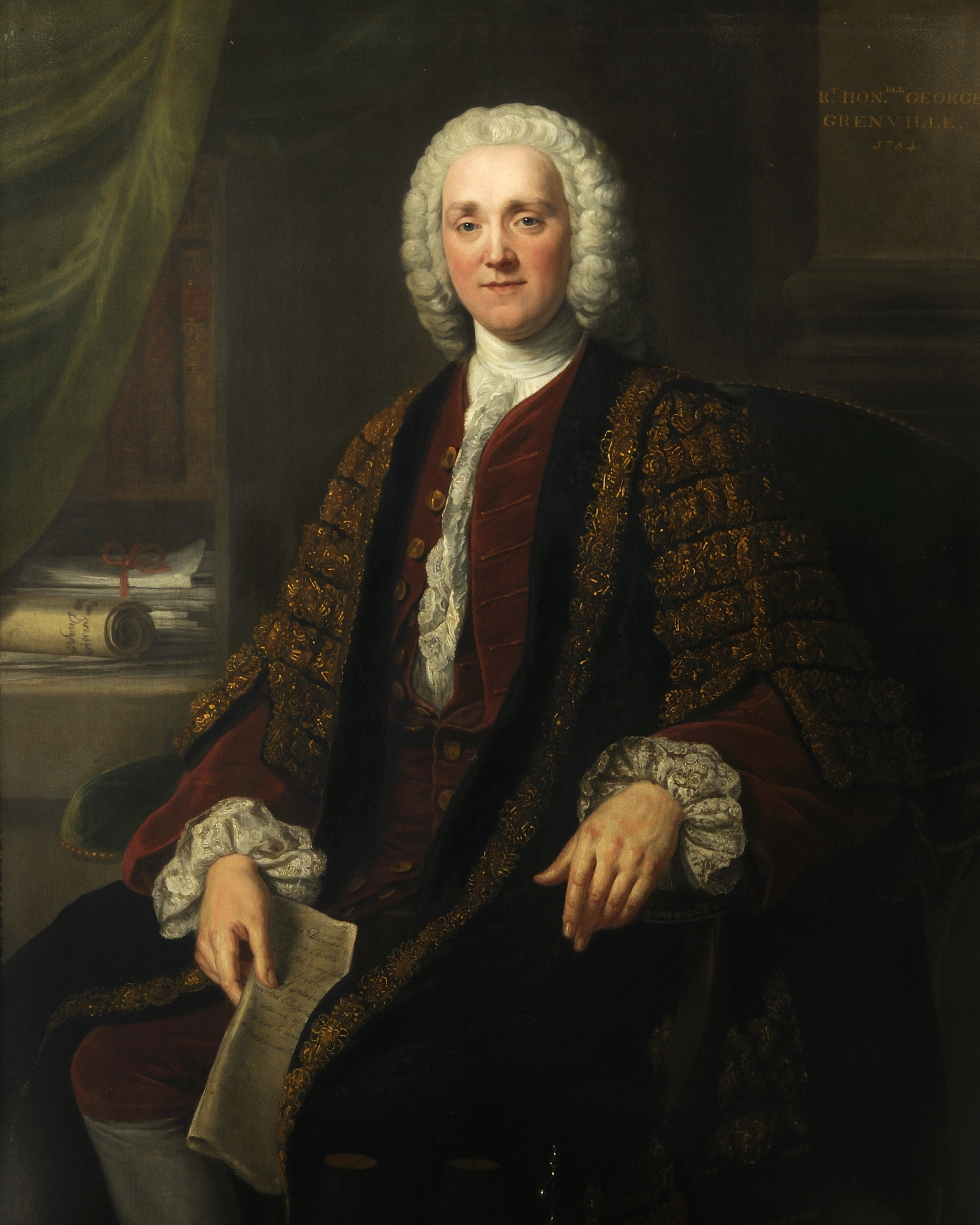
- Portrait by William Hoare, 1764

Prime Minister of Great Britain
- In office 16 April 1763 – 10 July 1765
- Monarch: George III
- Preceded by: The Earl of Bute
- Succeeded by: The Marquess of Rockingham

Chancellor of the Exchequer
- In office 16 April 1763 – 16 July 1765
- Prime Minister: Himself
- Preceded by: Sir Francis Dashwood, Bt
- Succeeded by: William Dowdeswell

First Lord of the Admiralty
- In office 14 October 1762 – 16 April 1763
- Prime Minister: The Earl of Bute
- Preceded by: The Earl of Halifax
- Succeeded by: The Earl of Sandwich

Northern Secretary
- In office 27 May 1762 – 9 October 1762
- Prime Minister: The Earl of Bute
- Preceded by: The Earl of Bute
- Succeeded by: The Earl of Halifax

Member of Parliament for Buckingham
- In office 11 June 1741 – 13 November 1770
- Preceded by: Richard Grenville
- Succeeded by: James Grenville

Personal details
- Born: 14 October 1712 Wotton Underwood, England
- Died: 13 November 1770 (aged 58) Mayfair, England
- Resting place: All Saints Churchyard, Wotton Underwood
- Party: Whig (Grenvillite)
- Spouse: Elizabeth Wyndham (m. 1749; died 1769)
- Children: 8; including George, Charlotte, Thomas and William
- Parents: Richard Grenville; Hester Temple
- Education: Christ Church, Oxford; Eton College

George Grenville (14 October 1712 – 13 November 1770) was a British Whig statesman who served as Prime Minister of Great Britain, during the early reign of the young King George III. He served for only two years (1763–1765), and attempted to solve the problem of the massive debt resulting from the Seven Years' War. He instituted a series of measures to increase revenue to the crown, including new taxes and enforcement of collection, and sought to bring the North American colonies under tighter crown control.

Born into an influential political family, Grenville first entered Parliament in 1741 as an MP for Buckingham. He emerged as one of the Cobhamites, a group of young members of Parliament associated with Lord Cobham. In 1754, Grenville became Treasurer of the Navy, a position he held twice until 1761. In October 1761 he chose to stay in government and accepted the new role of Leader of the Commons causing a rift with his brother-in-law and political ally William Pitt who had resigned. Grenville was subsequently made Northern Secretary and First Lord of the Admiralty by the new prime minister Lord Bute. On 8 April 1763, Lord Bute resigned, and Grenville assumed his position as prime minister.

His government tried to bring public spending under control and pursued an assertive policy over the North American colonies and colonial settlers. His best-known policy is the Stamp Act, a long-standing tax in Great Britain which Grenville extended to the colonies in America, but which instigated widespread opposition in Britain's American colonies and was later repealed. Grenville had increasingly strained relations with his colleagues and the King. In 1765, he was dismissed by George III and replaced by Lord Rockingham. For the last five years of his life, Grenville led a group of his supporters in opposition and staged a public reconciliation with Pitt.

Grenville married Elizabeth Wyndham, the granddaughter of Charles Seymour, 6th Duke of Somerset, the great-great-grandson of Lady Katherine Grey, who was herself a great-granddaughter of Henry VII and Elizabeth of York, and sister of Lady Jane Grey.

== Early life: 1712–1741 ==
=== Family ===
George Grenville was born at Wotton House on 14 October 1712. He was the second son of Sir Richard Grenville and Hester Temple (later the 1st Countess Temple). He was one of five brothers, all of whom became MPs. His sister Hester Grenville married the leading political figure William Pitt, 1st Earl of Chatham. His elder brother was Richard Grenville, later the 2nd Earl Temple. It was intended by his parents that George Grenville should become a lawyer.

=== Education ===
Grenville was educated at Eton College and at Christ Church, Oxford, but did not graduate.

== Early political career: 1741–1756 ==
=== Member of Parliament ===
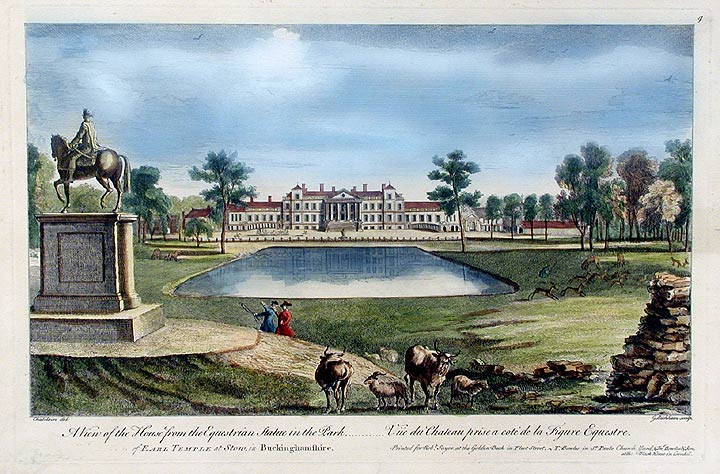
Stowe House in Buckinghamshire, the political base of the Cobhamites; in 1749, ownership of the estate passed to Grenville's brother Richard.

He entered Parliament in 1741 as one of the two members for Buckingham, and continued to represent that borough for the next 29 years until his death. He was disappointed to be giving up what appeared to be a promising legal career for the uncertainties of opposition politics.

In Parliament, he subscribed to the "Boy Patriot" party, which opposed Sir Robert Walpole. In particular he enjoyed the patronage of his uncle Lord Cobham, the leader of a faction that included George Grenville, his brother Richard, William Pitt and George Lyttelton that became known as the Cobhamites.

=== Administration ===
In December 1744 he became a Lord of the Admiralty in the administration of Henry Pelham. He allied himself with his brother Richard and with William Pitt (who became their brother-in-law in 1754) in forcing Pelham to give them promotion by rebelling against his authority and obstructing business. In June 1747, Grenville became a Lord of the Treasury.

In 1754 Grenville was made Treasurer of the Navy and Privy Councillor. Along with Pitt and several other colleagues he was dismissed in 1755 after speaking and voting against the government on a debate about a recent subsidy treaty with Russia which they believed was unnecessarily costly, and would drag Britain into Continental European disputes. Opposition to European entanglements was a cornerstone of Patriot Whig thinking.

He and Pitt joined the opposition, haranguing the Newcastle government. Grenville and Pitt both championed the formation of a British militia to provide additional security rather than the deployment of Hessian mercenaries favoured by the government. As the military situation deteriorated following the loss of Minorca, the government grew increasingly weak until it was forced to resign in Autumn 1756.

== In Government: 1756–1763 ==
=== Treasurer of the Navy ===
Pitt then formed a government led by the Duke of Devonshire. Grenville was returned to his position as Treasurer of the Navy, which was a great disappointment as he had been expecting to receive the more prestigious and lucrative post of Paymaster of the Forces. This added to what Grenville regarded as a series of earlier slights in which Pitt and others had passed him over for positions in favour of men he considered no more talented than he was. From then on Grenville felt a growing resentment towards Pitt, and grew closer to the young Prince of Wales and his advisor Lord Bute who were both now opposed to Pitt.

In 1758, as Treasurer of the Navy, he introduced and carried a bill which established a fairer system of paying the wages of seamen and supporting their families while they were at sea which was praised for its humanity if not for its effectiveness. He remained in office during the years of British victories, notably the Annus Mirabilis of 1759 for which the credit went to the government of which he was a member. However his seven-year-old son died after a long illness and Grenville remained by his side at their country house in Wotton and rarely came to London.

When the Buckinghamshire Militia was reformed in 1759, the county lieutenancy nominated several local MPs as officers, including Grenville and John Wilkes.

In 1761, when Pitt resigned upon the question of the war with Spain, and subsequently functioned as Leader of the House of Commons in the administration of Lord Bute. Grenville's role was seen as an attempt to keep someone closely associated with Pitt involved in the government, in order to prevent Pitt and his supporters actively opposing the government. However, it soon led to conflict between Grenville and Pitt. Grenville was also seen as a suitable candidate because his reputation for honesty meant he commanded loyalty and respect amongst independent MPs.

=== Northern Secretary ===
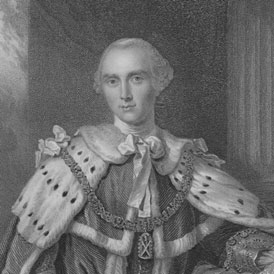
Grenville served under British Prime Minister Lord Bute between 1762 and 1763 and later succeeded him.

In May 1762, Grenville was appointed Northern Secretary, where he took an increasingly hard line in the negotiations with France and Spain designed to bring the Seven Years' War to a close.

Grenville demanded much greater compensation in exchange for the return of British conquests, while Bute favored a more generous position which eventually formed the basis of the Treaty of Paris. In spite of this, Grenville had now become associated with Bute rather than his former political allies who were even more vocal in their opposition to the peace treaty than he was. In October he was made First Lord of the Admiralty. Henry Fox took over as Leader of the Commons, and forced the peace treaty through parliament.

Bute's position grew increasingly untenable as he was extremely unpopular, which led to him offering his resignation to George III on several occasions. Bute was the target of the radical John Wilkes's criticism and satire. He was ridiculed in Wilkes' newspaper The North Briton, a stereotypical reference to the prime minister's Scottish heritage.

== Prime Minister: 1763–1765 ==
=== Appointment ===
Bute's intention to resign was genuine, and the hostile press attacks and the continuing unpopularity of his government finally led to King George III to reluctantly accept his resignation. Though the king was unsure whom should be appoint to the position and Bute highly recommended that the King should appoint Grenville as the new prime minister. Despite the King's disapproval and distrust of his ministers, he considered appointing Grenville to office.

When Grenville was asked about becoming the new prime minister, he agreed only on the condition that Bute would not take an active part in politics and be barred from voicing policies for the government. The King agreed and thus appointed Grenville as new prime minister. George III assured Grenville that "he meant to put his government solely into his hand". Grenville set to work and formed his government on 16 April 1763. He appointed two of his trusted allies Lord Halifax and Charles Wyndham, 2nd Earl of Egremont as Northern Secretary and Southern Secretary respectively. He also appointed the Lord Northington as Lord High Chancellor, Lord Granville as Lord President of the Council as well.

=== Domestic issues ===
==== Arrest of John Wilkes ====
House of Commons was thrown into doubt by the first case involving the Member of Parliament John Wilkes, a radical reformer and political activist who promoted parliamentary representation and reform, whose critique of the former prime minister led to his resignation. Wilkes was regarded by many as threat to the government and therefore was treated suspiciously. In 1763, one of Grenville's first acts was to order Wilkes's removal from command of the Buckinghamshire Militia and prosecute his former fellow-officer for publishing in The North Briton newspaper an article deriding King George III's speech made on 23 April 1763. Wilkes was prosecuted for "seditious libel". That was a massive tactical blunder by the secretaries of state, for it was perceived as a violation of individual liberty that raised the political discontent.

After fighting a duel with a supporter of the Grenville ministry, Samuel Martin, Wilkes fled to France for asylum. Despite government officials calling on him to be arrested, Wilkes was later returned to England and was elected and re-elected by the Middlesex constituency. He was continually refused admission to parliament by parliament, and proved a problem to several successive governments.

==== Monetary debt ====
The time of the Seven Years' War was a tumultuous period in the history of Europe and was fought on a global conflict scale. Even though Great Britain defeated France and its allies and rose to the position as a dominant world power, the victory came at a great cost. In January 1763, Great Britain's national debt was more than £122 million pounds, an enormous sum for the time. Interest on the debt was more than £4.4 million a year. Figuring out how to pay the interest alone absorbed the attention of the King and his ministers.

As Britain was trying to recover from the costs of the Seven Years' War and now in dire need of finances for the British army in the American colonies, Grenville's most immediate task was to restore the nation's finances. He also had to deal with the fall-out from Pontiac's Rebellion, which erupted in North America in 1763. Although, initially, prominent measures of his government included the prosecution of John Wilkes, focus shifted from arresting radicals to paying off the national debt. The passing of the tax measures in America had proved to be a disaster and would lead to the first symptoms of alienation between American colonies and Great Britain.

=== Colonial reforms ===
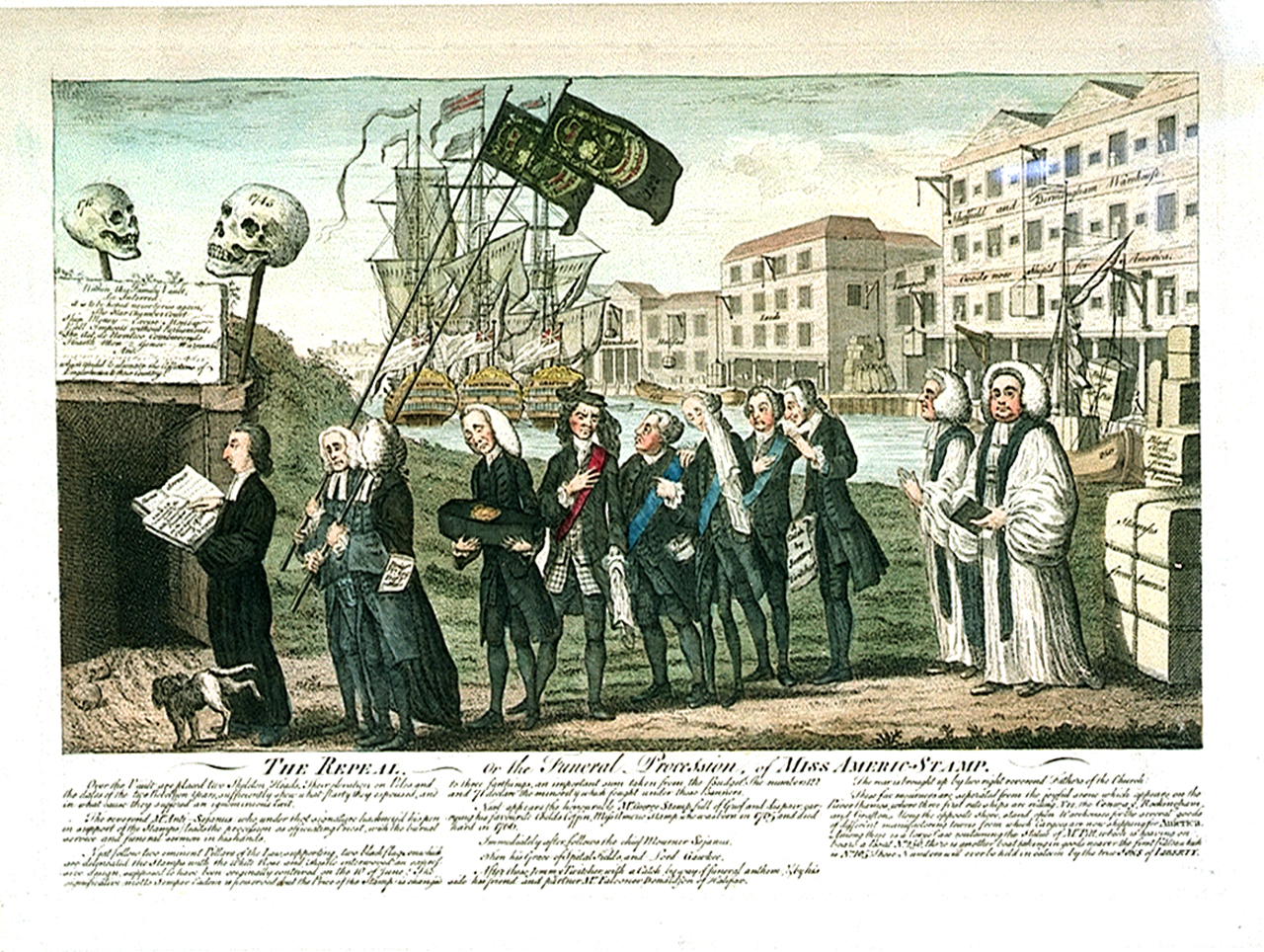
Cartoon depicting the repeal of the Stamp Act as a funeral, with Grenville carrying a child's coffin marked "Miss America Stamp born 1765, died 1766" (The Skulls refer to the Scottish Rebellions of 1715 and 1745)

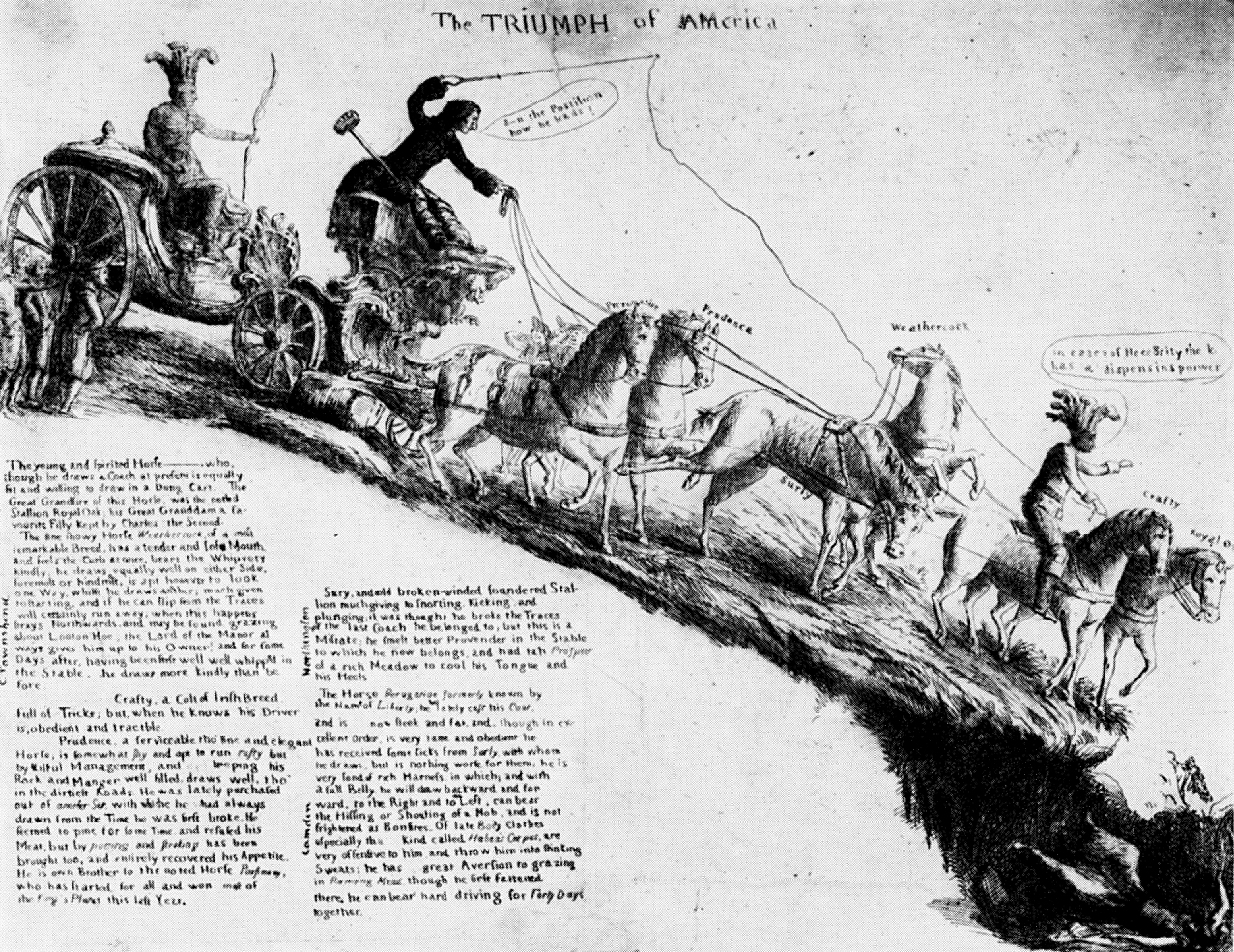
An English Newspaper on the repeal of the Stamp Act

==== Measures and taxes ====
Many of the acts passed by the British were perceived by the colonists as threatening to their liberties. Although not a part of the Grenville government's programme, the issue was generally attributed to him by the colonists. Another of the controversial acts passed by Grenville was the Quartering Act on 15 May 1765. It was enacted after a request by Major-General Thomas Gage, commander-in-chief in North America, to have better housing for his troops.

One of the more prominent measures of the Grenville's government occurred in March 1765 when Grenville authored the Stamp Act 1765, enacted in November of that year. It was an exclusive tax placed on the colonies in America requiring that documents and newspapers be printed on stamped paper from London bearing an embossed revenue stamp that had to be paid for in British currency. It was met with general outrage and resulted in public acts of disobedience and rioting throughout the colonies in America.

=== Foreign policy ===
The signing of the treaty in February 1763 formally marked the conclusion of the Seven Years' War experienced by Britain and as such, foreign policy, along with military policy and diplomacy, no longer became the dominant concern of both domestic politics and government agenda. Focus thus shifted to seemingly more relevant issues such as the survival of the Grenville Ministry. But overall the British relations, after negotiating, with the French and the Spanish, remained hostile and suspicious of its enemies and that wariness concluded the entirety of Grenville's policy.

In disputes with Spain and France, Grenville managed to secure British objectives by deploying what was later described as gunboat diplomacy. During his ministry, Britain's international isolation increased, as Britain failed to secure alliances with other major European powers, a situation that subsequent governments were unable to reverse leading to Britain fighting several countries during the American War of Independence without a major ally.

=== Dismissal ===
The King made various attempts to induce Pitt to come to his rescue by forming a ministry, but without success. George at last had recourse to Lord Rockingham. When Rockingham agreed to accept office, the king dismissed Grenville in July 1765. He never again held office.

The nickname of "gentle shepherd" was given him because he bored the House by asking over and over again, during the debate on the Cider Bill of 1763, that somebody should tell him "where" to lay the new tax if it was not to be put on cider. Pitt whistled the air of the popular tune (by Boyce) Gentle Shepherd, tell me where, and the House laughed. Though few surpassed him in knowledge of the forms of the House or in mastery of administrative details, he lacked tact in dealing with people and affairs.

== Later life: 1765–1770 ==
Grenville's bones exhibiting multiple myeloma displayed at the Hunterian Museum, London

=== In Opposition ===
After a period of active opposition to the Chatham Ministry led by Pitt between 1766 and 1768, Grenville became an elder statesman during his last few years – seeking to avoid becoming associated with any faction or party in the House of Commons. He was able to oversee the re-election of his core group of supporters in the 1768 General Election. His followers included Robert Clive and Lord George Sackville and he received support from his elder brother Lord Temple.

In late 1768 he reconciled with Pitt and the two joined forces, re-uniting the partnership that had broken up in 1761 when Pitt had resigned from the government. Grenville was successful in mobilising the opposition during the Middlesex election dispute.

Grenville prosecuted John Wilkes and the printers and authors for treason and sedition for publishing a bitter editorial about King George III's recent speech in "The North Briton" a weekly periodical. After losing the case Grenville lost favor from the public who regarded the act as an attempt to silence or control the press.

=== Advocate and critic ===
Although personally opposed to Wilkes, Grenville saw the government's attempt to bar him from the Commons as unconstitutional and opposed it on principle.

Following a French invasion of Corsica in 1768 Grenville advocated sending British support to the Corsican Republic. Grenville was critical of the Grafton Government's failure to intervene and he considered such weakness would encourage the French. In the House of Commons he observed "For fear of going to war, you will make a war unavoidable".

In 1770 Grenville steered a bill concerning the results of contested elections, a major issue in the eighteenth century, into law – despite strong opposition from the government.

=== Death ===
Grenville died on 13 November 1770, aged 58. His personal following divided after his death, with a number joining the government of Lord North. In the long-term, the Grenvillites were revived by William Pitt the Younger who served as prime minister from 1783 and dominated British politics until his death in 1806. Grenville's own son, William Grenville, later served briefly as prime minister. Grenville is buried at Wotton Underwood in Buckinghamshire

Grenville's post mortem was carried up by John Hunter who retained specimens in his collection which later became the Hunterian Museum. Subsequent analysis of these specimens published by the Royal College of Surgeons of England suggests that Grenville was affected by multiple myeloma at the time of his death.

== Legacy ==
Grenville was one of relatively few prime ministers who never acceded to the peerage.

The town of Grenville, Quebec, was named after George Grenville. The town is in turn the namesake for the Grenville orogeny, a long-lived Mesoproterozoic mountain-building event associated with the assembly of the supercontinent Rodinia. Its record is a prominent orogenic belt which spans a significant portion of the North American continent, from Labrador to Mexico, and extends to Scotland.

The alternate history novel The Two Georges (1995), by Richard Dreyfuss and Harry Turtledove, is set in a world where America is still part of the British Empire in the 1990s, the Revolution never having happened. In the first chapter, Grenville is referenced as a prominent politician who failed to gain the prime ministry, implying that this is the point of divergence, as the Stamp Act and other relevant catalysts would not have happened.

== Family life ==
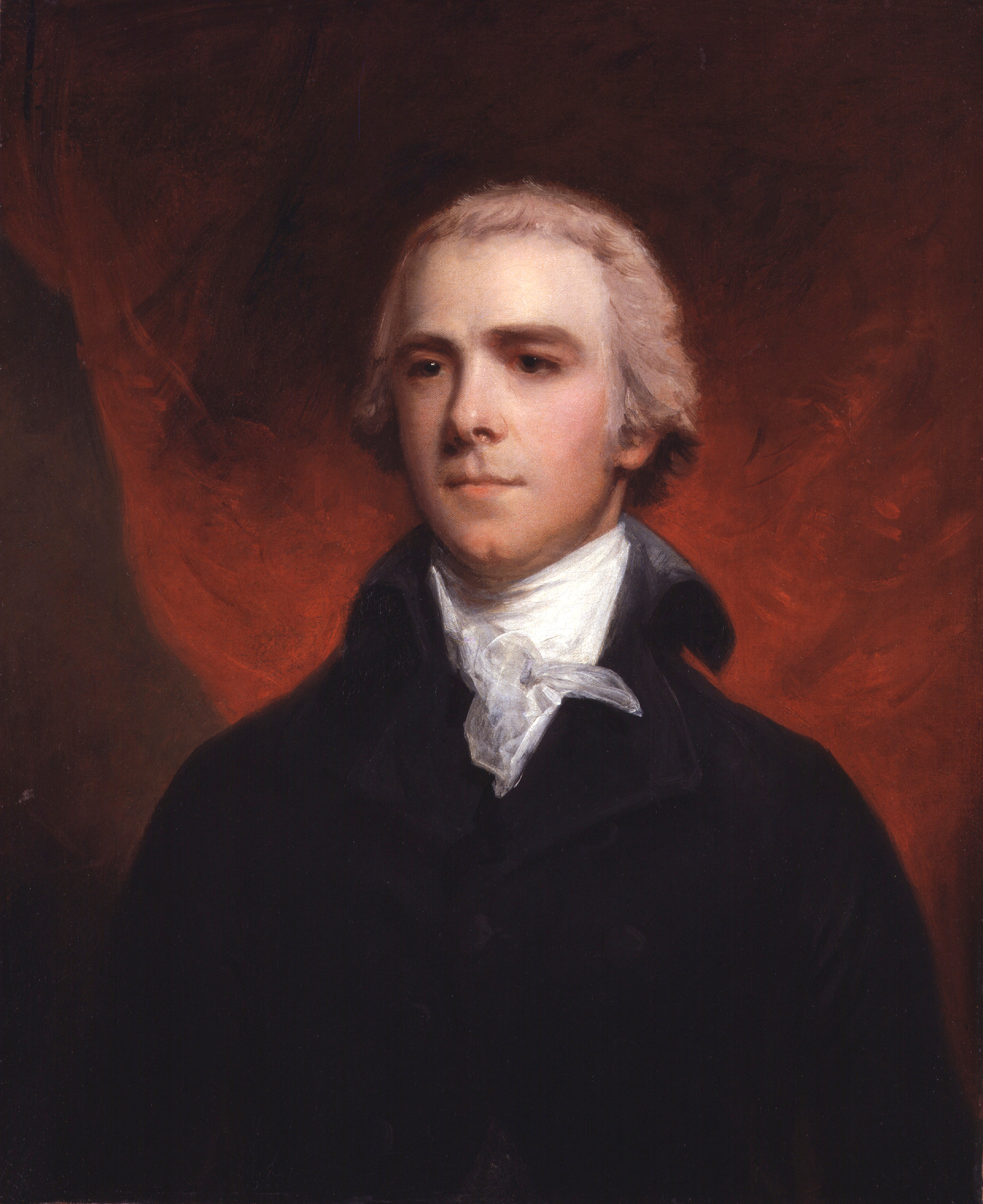
Portrait of Lord Grenville by John Hoppner. Grenville's son William, a prominent politician of the Regency era, served as Prime Minister from 1806 to 1807.

In 1749 Grenville married Elizabeth Wyndham (1719 – 5 December 1769), daughter of Sir William Wyndham, and the granddaughter of Charles Seymour, 6th Duke of Somerset. Somerset did not approve of their marriage and consequently left Elizabeth only a small sum in his will.

The couple had four sons and four daughters. (One account states they had five daughters.)

1. Richard Grenville (died 1759), died young
2. George Nugent-Temple-Grenville, 1st Marquess of Buckingham (17 June 1753 – 11 February 1813), father of the 1st Duke of Buckingham and Chandos
3. Charlotte Grenville (c. 1754 – 29 September 1830), married Sir Watkin Williams-Wynn, 4th Baronet (1749–1789) on 21 December 1771, and had eight children, six of whom survived to adulthood
4. Thomas Grenville (31 December 1755 – 17 December 1846), MP and bibliophile, died unmarried
5. Elizabeth Grenville (24 October 1756 – 21 December 1842), married (as his second wife) John Proby, 1st Earl of Carysfort (1751–1828), on 12 April 1787, and had three daughters
6. William Grenville, 1st Baron Grenville (25 October 1759 – 12 January 1834), later Prime Minister
7. Catherine Grenville (1761 – 6 November 1796), married Richard Neville-Aldworth (1750–1825), afterwards Richard Griffin, 2nd Baron Braybrooke, on 19 June 1780, and had four children.
8. Hester Grenville (before 1767 – 13 November 1847), married Hugh Fortescue, 1st Earl Fortescue, on 10 May 1782 and had nine children

At the time of his death in 1770, he was the heir presumptive to the Earldom of Temple held by his elder brother Richard (who had succeeded their mother in that title in 1752, but had no sons). When Richard died in 1779, George's second (but eldest surviving) son, also George, therefore succeeded as 3rd Earl Temple, and was later created Marquess of Buckingham. His male line survived until the death of the 3rd Duke of Buckingham and Chandos in 1889.

== Arms ==
Coat of arms of Grenville, of Wotton Underwood, Buckinghamshire
| Crest A garb vert. Escutcheon Vert, on a cross argent, three torteaux. Motto Repetens exempla suorum (Following the example set by our forebears). |

== See also ==
- Grenvillite

Political offices
| Preceded by Henry Legge | Treasurer of the Navy; 1756 | Succeeded by George Dodington |
| Preceded by George Dodington | Treasurer of the Navy; 1756–1762 | Succeeded by The Viscount Barrington |
| Preceded by William Pitt the Elder | Leader of the House of Commons; 1761–1762 | Succeeded by Henry Fox |
| Preceded by The Earl of Bute | Secretary of State for the Northern Department; 1762 | Succeeded by The Earl of Halifax |
| Preceded by The Earl of Halifax | First Lord of the Admiralty; 1762–1763 | Succeeded by The Earl of Sandwich |
| Preceded by The Earl of Bute | Prime Minister of Great Britain; 16 April 1763 – 10 July 1765 | Succeeded by The Marquess of Rockingham |
| Preceded by Sir Francis Dashwood, 2nd Bt | Chancellor of the Exchequer; 1763–1765 | Succeeded by William Dowdeswell |
| Preceded by Henry Fox | Leader of the House of Commons; 1763–1765 | Succeeded by Henry Seymour Conway |
Parliament of Great Britain
| Preceded by George Chamberlayne; Richard Grenville | Member of Parliament for Buckingham; 1741–1770; With: George Chamberlayne 1741–1747; Richard Grenville 1747–1753; Temple West 1753–1754; James Grenville 1754–1768; Henry Grenville | Succeeded by Henry Grenville; James Grenville |
