= Elizabeth Grenville =

English artist and writer (1719–1769)

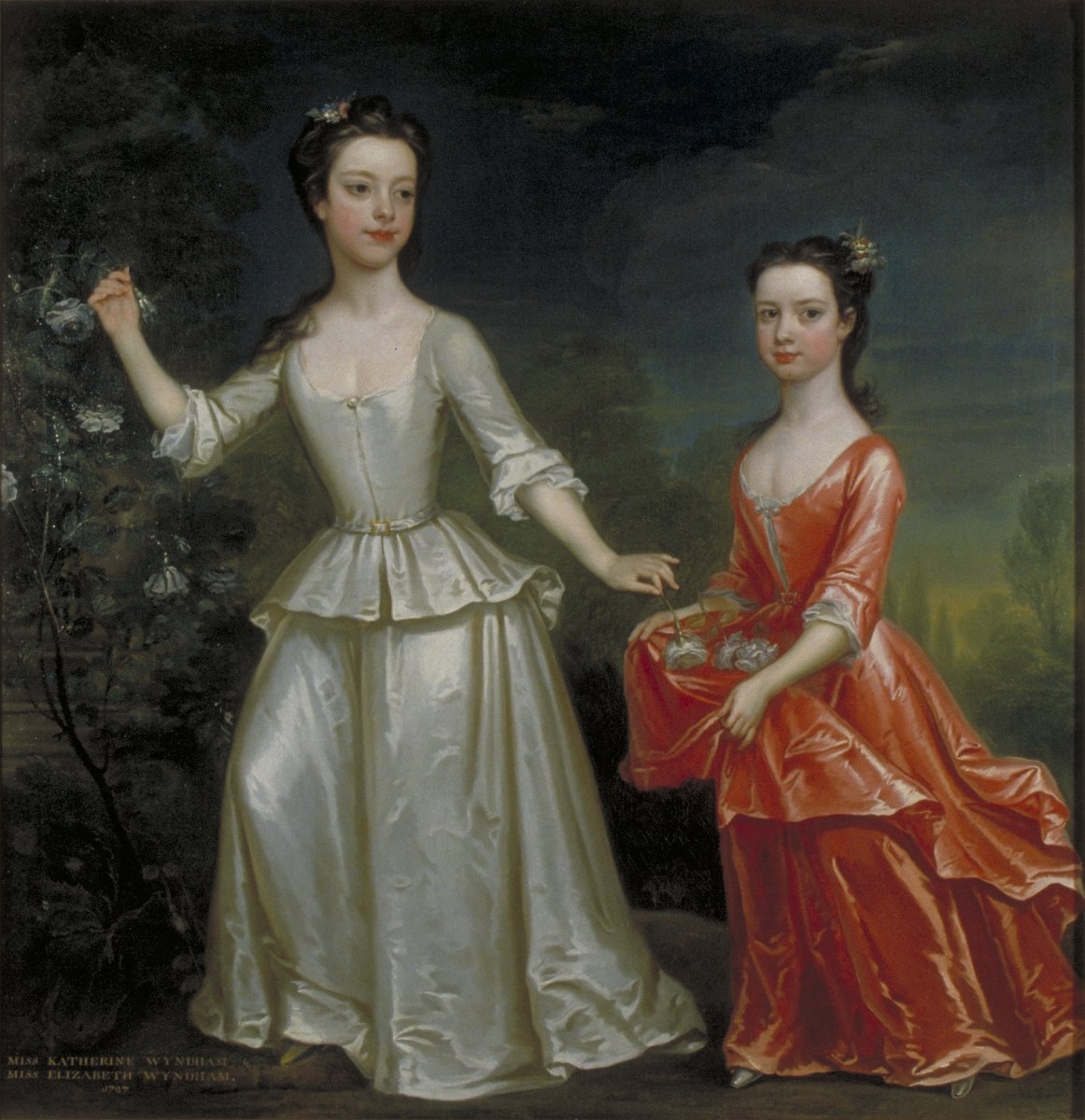
- A 1727 portrait of Elizabeth Wyndham (shown on the right) with her elder sister Catherine
- Born: Elizabeth Wyndham; 1719; Westminster, England
- Died: 5 December 1769 (aged 49–50); Wotton Underwood, Buckinghamshire, England
- Known for: Spouse of the prime minister of Great Britain (1763–1765)
- Spouse: George Grenville (m. 1749)
- Children: 8, including George, Charlotte, Thomas and William
- Father: Sir William Wyndham

Elizabeth Grenville (née Wyndham; 1719 – 5 December 1769) was an English artist and writer. She was the wife of George Grenville, prime minister from 1763 to 1765; the daughter of Sir William Wyndham, a prominent Tory politician; and the mother of William Grenville, prime minister from 1806 to 1807.

== Early life ==
She was born Elizabeth Wyndham in 1719 to Sir William Wyndham and his first wife, Lady Catherine Seymour, the daughter of Charles Seymour, 6th Duke of Somerset. She was baptised on 31 January 1719 in Westminster and had two elder brothers, Charles and Percy.

Her father was a prominent politician in the 1710s and 1720s, serving as Chancellor of the Exchequer and leader of the Tories. Elizabeth's mother died in 1731, and William remarried in 1734 to Maria Catherina de Jonge.

Elizabeth suffered from smallpox when she was young, which left scarring on her face.

== Writing and art ==
Elizabeth kept a book of newspaper cuttings, mostly relating to political subjects, and kept a diary of her husband's political career. She was also an amateur artist and produced several pastel works, including a self-portrait that was sold as part of the Stowe House sale of 1848.

== Marriage and family ==
On 16 May 1749, Elizabeth married George Grenville – at that time a lord of the Treasury and an MP for Buckingham. Her grandfather, the Duke of Somerset, did not approve of the marriage and left her only a small amount of money in his will. The couple took over the running of Wotton House in Buckinghamshire, where they raised their eight children:

- Richard Grenville (died 1759); died young
- George Nugent-Temple-Grenville, 1st Marquess of Buckingham (17 June 1753 – 11 February 1813); father of the 1st Duke of Buckingham and Chandos
- Charlotte Grenville (c. 1754 – 29 September 1830); married Sir Watkin Williams-Wynn, 4th Baronet (1749–1789) on 21 December 1771, and had eight children, six of whom survived to adulthood
- Thomas Grenville (31 December 1755 – 17 December 1846), MP and bibliophile, died unmarried
- Elizabeth Grenville (24 October 1756 – 21 December 1842); married (as his second wife) John Proby, 1st Earl of Carysfort (1751–1828), on 12 April 1787, and had three daughters
- William Grenville, 1st Baron Grenville (25 October 1759 – 12 January 1834); later Prime Minister
- Catherine Grenville (1761 – 6 November 1796); married Richard Neville-Aldworth (1750–1825), afterwards Richard Griffin, 2nd Baron Braybrooke, on 19 June 1780, and had four children.
- Hester Grenville (before 1767 – 13 November 1847); married Hugh Fortescue, 1st Earl Fortescue, on 10 May 1782 and had nine children

George Grenville became prime minister in 1763. Although his ministry lasted only two years he remained at the forefront of politics throughout the 1760s. Elizabeth died on 5 December 1769 and was buried eight days later in Wotton Underwood, as was her husband following his death a year later.
