= William Grenville, 1st Baron Grenville =

Prime Minister of the United Kingdom from 1806 to 1807

The Right Honourable The Lord Grenville PC PC (Ire) FRS
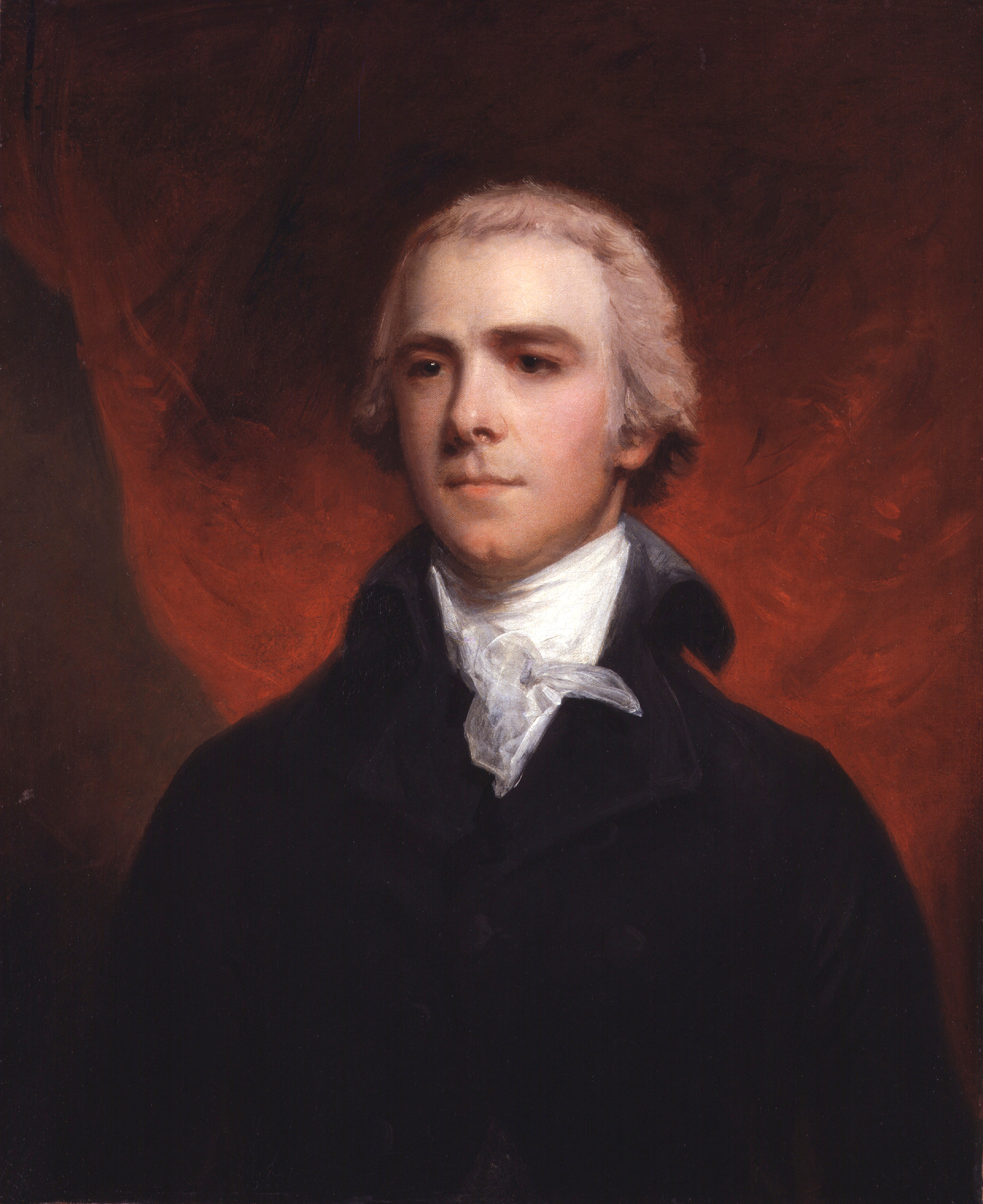
- Portrait of Lord Grenville by John Hoppner, c. 1800

Prime Minister of the United Kingdom
- In office 11 February 1806 – 25 March 1807
- Monarch: George III
- Preceded by: William Pitt the Younger
- Succeeded by: The Duke of Portland

Speaker of the House of Commons of Great Britain
- In office 5 January 1789 – 5 June 1789
- Monarch: George III
- Prime Minister: William Pitt the Younger
- Preceded by: Charles Wolfran Cornwall
- Succeeded by: Henry Addington
Ministerial offices
Foreign Secretary
In office 8 June 1791 – 20 February 1801
Prime Minister	William Pitt the Younger
Preceded by	The Marquess of Carmarthen
Succeeded by	The Lord Hawkesbury
President of the Board of Control
In office 12 March 1790 – 28 June 1793
Prime Minister	William Pitt the Younger
Preceded by	The Viscount Sydney
Succeeded by	Henry Dundas
Home Secretary
In office 5 June 1789 – 8 June 1791
Prime Minister	William Pitt the Younger
Preceded by	The Viscount Sydney
Succeeded by	Henry Dundas
Vice-President of the Board of Trade
In office 23 August 1786 – 8 August 1789
Prime Minister	William Pitt the Younger
Preceded by	Office established
Succeeded by	The Duke of Montrose
Paymaster of the Forces
In office 26 December 1783 – 4 September 1789
Prime Minister	William Pitt the Younger
Preceded by	Edmund Burke
Succeeded by	The Duke of Montrose
Chief Secretary for Ireland
In office 15 August 1782 – 2 May 1783
Prime Minister	The Earl of Shelburne
Preceded by	Richard FitzPatrick
Succeeded by	William Windham

Member of Parliament
- In office 1782–1790
- Preceded by: Richard Aldworth-Neville
- Succeeded by: James Grenville
- Constituency: Buckingham (1782–1784); Buckinghamshire (1784–1790)

Personal details
- Born: William Wyndham Grenville; 25 October 1759 Wotton Underwood, Buckinghamshire, England
- Died: 12 January 1834 (aged 74) Burnham, Buckinghamshire, England
- Resting place: St Peter's Church, Burnham
- Party: Pittite Tory (before 1801, after 1816); Whig (c. 1803–1815)
- Spouse: Anne Pitt (m. 1792)
- Parents: George Grenville (father); Elizabeth Wyndham (mother)
- Education: Christ Church, Oxford

William Wyndham Grenville, 1st Baron Grenville (25 October 1759 – 12 January 1834) was Prime Minister of the United Kingdom from 1806 to 1807. Originally a Pittite Tory, he was a supporter of the Whigs for the duration of the Napoleonic Wars and held several cabinet positions, including ten years as foreign secretary. As prime minister, his most significant achievement was the abolition of the slave trade in 1807. However, his government failed to either make peace with France or to accomplish Catholic emancipation, and it was dismissed in the same year.

== Background ==
Grenville was the son of the Whig Prime Minister George Grenville. His mother, Elizabeth, was the daughter of the Tory statesman Sir William Wyndham, 3rd Baronet. He had two elder brothers: Thomas and George. He was thus uncle to the 1st Duke of Buckingham and Chandos.

He was also related to the Pitt family by marriage since William Pitt, 1st Earl of Chatham, had married his father's sister Hester. The younger Grenville was thus the first cousin of William Pitt the Younger.

Grenville was educated at Eton College; Christ Church, Oxford; and Lincoln's Inn.

Grenville was the maternal great-grandson of Charles Seymour, 6th Duke of Somerset and therefore a descendant of Lady Katherine Grey, a great-granddaughter of Henry VII and Elizabeth of York.

== Political career ==
Grenville entered the House of Commons in February 1782 as member for the borough of Buckingham. He soon became a close ally of the prime minister, his cousin William Pitt the Younger. In September, he became secretary to the Lord Lieutenant of Ireland, who was his brother George. He left the House the following year and served in the government as Paymaster of the Forces from 1784 to 1789. In September 1784 his cousin, William Pitt the Younger, informed Grenville that the King had asked him pointedly when he would return from his Continental tour. Pitt replied that he would return in six weeks, and therefore six weeks later George III asked Pitt, once more to become First Minister. This time he agreed. When in office Pitt drew Grenville closer giving him a position and experience at debating for the administration in the Commons. After a number of years learning his craft, and being used by Pitt in diplomatic missions abroad, Pitt planned for Grenville to replace Lord Sydney as Home Secretary but the King's illness halted any movement. Now Pitt was concerned about his tenure as Minister, but the unexpected death of the House of Commons Speaker, Charles Wolfran Cornwall, meant that Grenville could be elected as Cornwall's replacement. In the Speaker's chair Grenville would be a support to Pitt, who was attempting to stall legal proceedings for a Regency as long as he could. This was in the hope that the King would recover. Grenville therefore served briefly as Speaker of the House of Commons before he entered the cabinet as Home Secretary, in place of Lord Spencer and resigned his other posts. He became Leader of the House of Lords when he was raised to the peerage the next year as Baron Grenville, of Wotton under Bernewood in the County of Buckingham.

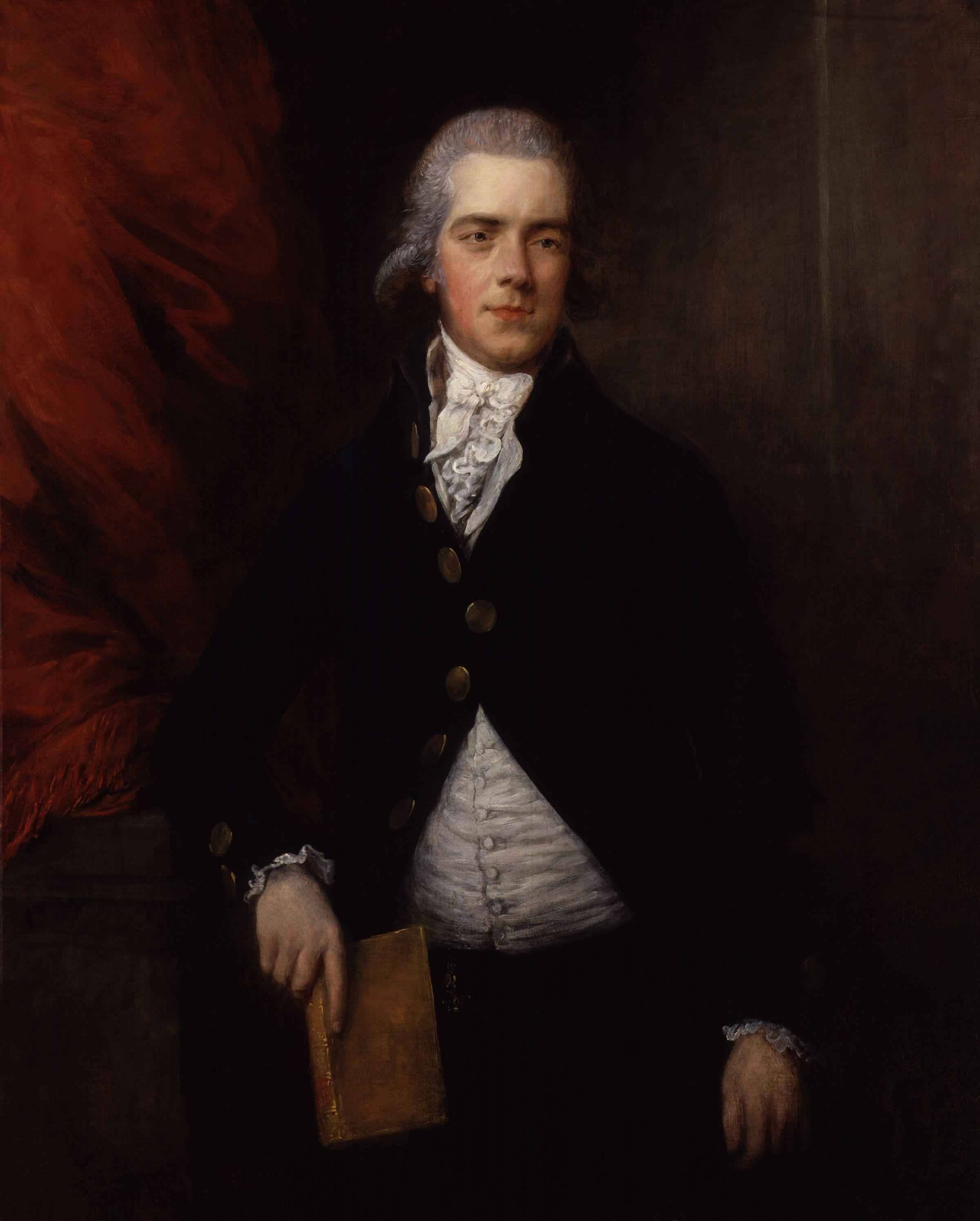
Lord Grenville by Gainsborough Dupont, c. 1790

In 1791, Grenville was again moved by Pitt into another office. This time he succeeded Francis Osborne, 5th Duke of Leeds as Foreign Secretary. Grenville was manoeuvred into position by Pitt when Leeds resigned over Pitt's change in policy regarding Russia. Although not happy with the change, as Grenville preferred to remain in the less demanding Home Office, he submitted to Pitt's wishes and dutifully obeyed his cousin and exchanged the Home office seals for the Foreign Department. Grenville's decade as Foreign Secretary was dramatic with the Wars of the French Revolution. During the war, Grenville was the leader of the party that focused on the fighting on Continental Europe as the key to victory and opposed the faction of Henry Dundas, which favoured war at sea and in the colonies. Grenville's focus led him to dispatch agents such as William Wickham to the Continent to collect information and engage with Royalists to counter the Revolution.

Whilst acting as Foreign Secretary Grenville grew close to George III. The Secretary supported a vigorous war against the French and was not in favour of making peace on terms which he considered beneath Britain's honour. Siding with the King, who wanted war to continue unless the Bourbons were restored in France, Grenville became an obstacle to Pitt's desire to make peace with France in 1797. As Foreign Secretary negotiations with foreign powers went through Grenville, including peace negotiations. Pitt was not happy with this arrangement when he saw that Grenville's despatches to the British diplomat in France, James Harris Earl Malmesbury were unnecessarily harsh and uncompromising. Pitt therefore sent secret despatches of his own to Malmesbury hoping that in this way the negotiations for peace would be successful. George Canning, who was devoted to Pitt, had been made an under-secretary in the Foreign Department with the task to intercept despatches to Malmesbury for Pitt and send Pitt's messages, secretly to the diplomat. This disagreement in views continued whenever peace with France was discussed.

Grenville left office with Pitt in 1801 over the issue of George III's refusal to assent to Catholic emancipation.

Grenville did part-time military service at home as Major in the Buckinghamshire Yeomanry cavalry in 1794 and as lieutenant-colonel in the South Buckinghamshire volunteer regiment in 1806.

In his years out of office, Grenville became close to the opposition Whig leader Charles James Fox, and when Pitt returned to office in 1804, Grenville sided with Fox and did not take part.

=== Prime minister ===
After Pitt's death in 1806, Grenville became the head of the "Ministry of All the Talents", a coalition between Grenville's supporters, the Foxite Whigs, and the supporters of former Prime Minister Lord Sidmouth, with Grenville as First Lord of the Treasury and Fox as Foreign Secretary as joint leaders. Grenville's cousin William Windham served as Secretary of State for War and the Colonies, and his younger brother, Thomas Grenville, served briefly as First Lord of the Admiralty.

The Ministry ultimately accomplished little and failed either to make peace with France or to accomplish Catholic emancipation, the latter attempt resulting in the ministry's dismissal in March 1807. It had one significant achievement, however, in the abolition of the slave trade in 1807.

=== Post-premiership ===
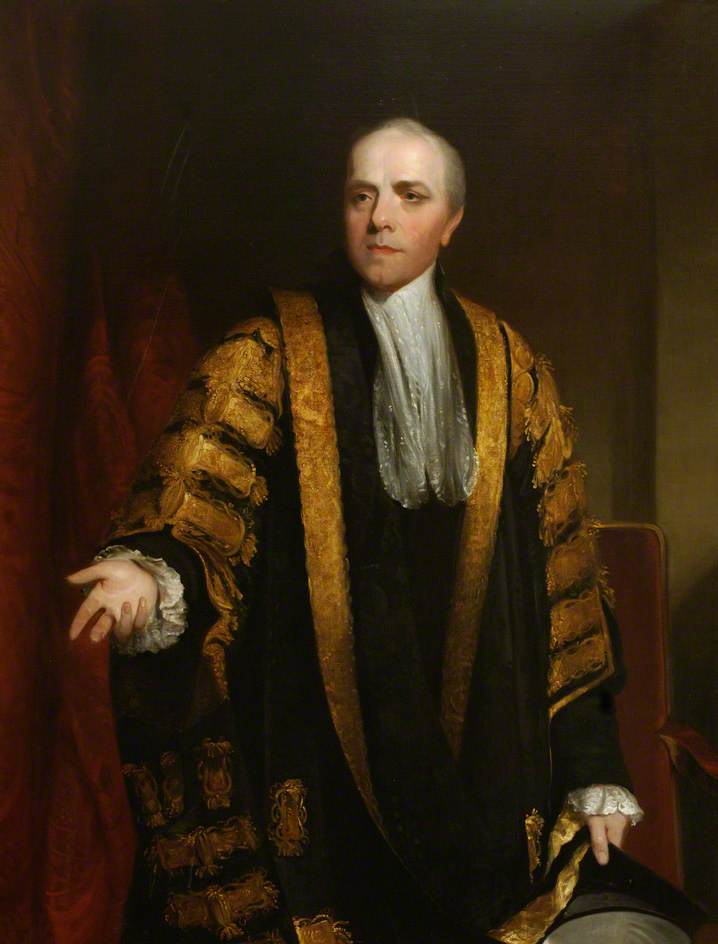
Lord Grenville as Chancellor of Oxford, by William Owen, c. 1809-25

In the years after the fall of the ministry, Grenville continued in opposition by maintaining his alliance with Lord Grey and the Whigs, criticising the Peninsular War and, with Grey, refusing to join Lord Liverpool's government in 1812.

In the postwar years, Grenville gradually moved back closer to the Tories but never again returned to the cabinet. In 1815, he separated from his friend Charles Grey and supported the war policy of Lord Liverpool. In 1819, when the Marquess of Lansdowne brought forward his motion for an inquiry into the causes of the distress and discontent in the manufacturing districts, Grenville delivered a speech advocating repressive measures. His political career was ended by a stroke in 1823.

Grenville also served as Chancellor of the University of Oxford from 1810 until his death in 1834.

== Legacy ==
Historians find it hard to tell exactly which separate roles Pitt, Grenville and Dundas played in setting war policy toward France but agree that Grenville played a major role at all times until 1801. The consensus of scholars is that war with France presented an unexpected complex of problems. There was a conflict between secular ideologies, the conscription of huge armies, the new role of the Russian Empire as a continental power, and especially the sheer length and cost of the multiple coalitions.

Grenville energetically worked to build and hold together the Allied coalitions and paid suitable attention to smaller members such as Denmark and the Kingdom of Sardinia. He negotiated the complex alliance with Russia and the Austrian Empire. He hoped that with British financing, they would bear the brunt of the ground campaigns against the French.

Grenville's influence was at the maximum during the formation of the Second Coalition. His projections of easy success were greatly exaggerated, and the result was another round of disappointment. His resignation in 1801 was caused primarily by George III's refusal to allow Catholics to sit in Parliament.

His personal acquaintance, Captain George Vancouver, named Point Grenville in what is now Washington state after him in 1792.

== Dropmore House ==
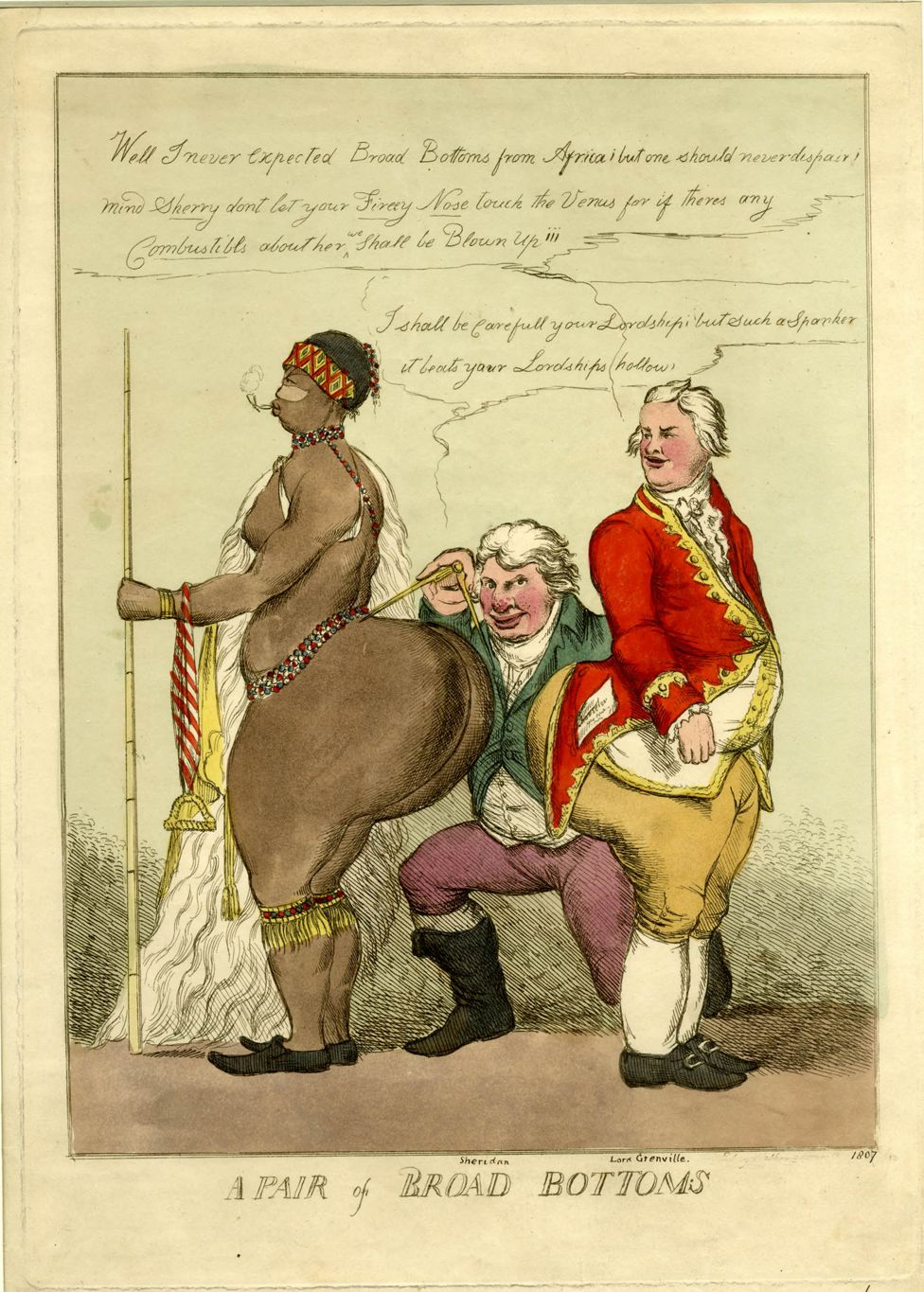
A caricature of Saartjie Baartman, Lord Grenville, and Richard Brinsley Sheridan by William Heath

Dropmore House was built in the 1790s for Lord Grenville. The architects were Samuel Wyatt and Charles Tatham. Grenville knew the spot from rambles during his time at Eton College and prized its distant views of his old school and of Windsor Castle. On his first day in occupation, he planted two cedar trees. At least another 2,500 trees were planted. By the time he died, his pinetum contained the biggest collection of conifer species in Britain. Part of the post-millennium restoration is to use what survives as the basis for a collection of some 200 species.

== Personal life ==
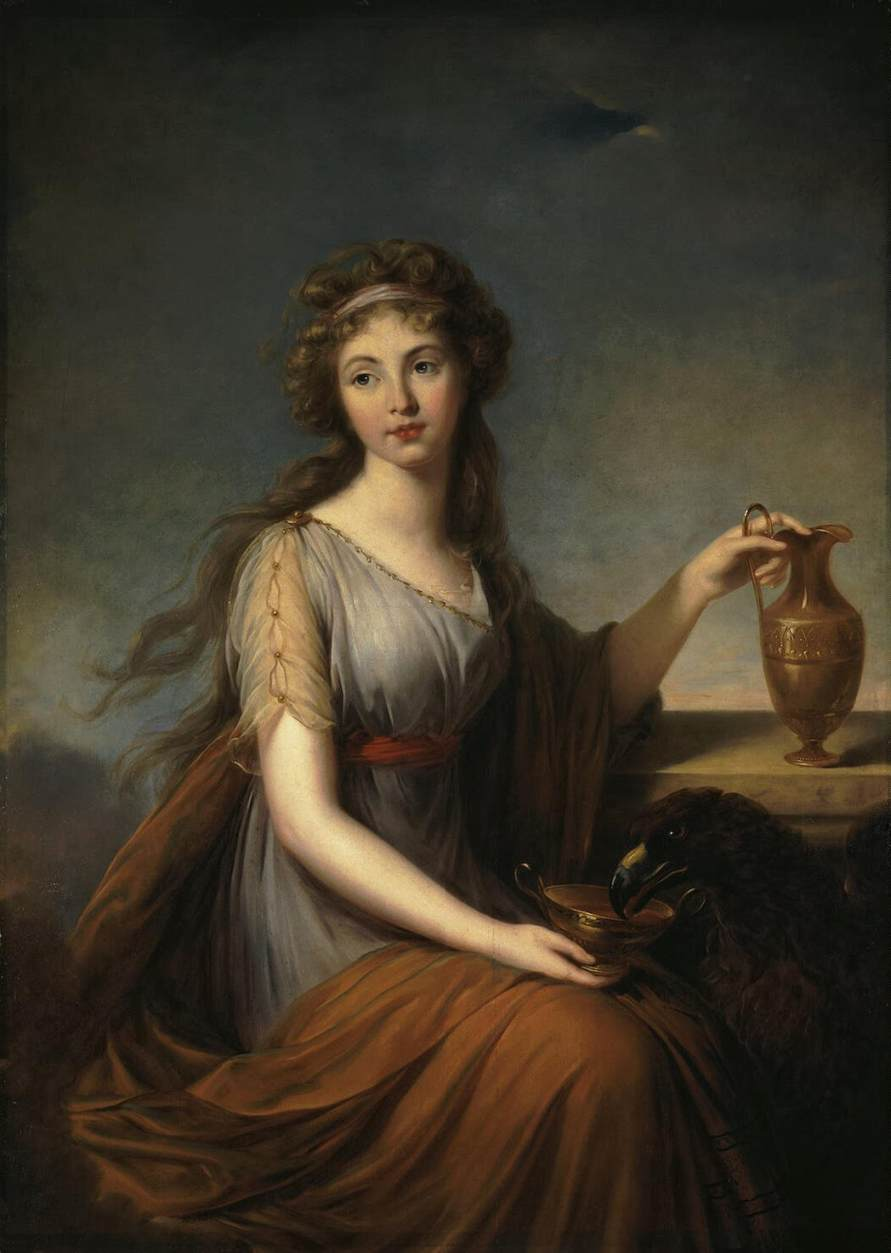
Anne Pitt as Hebe by Élisabeth Vigée Le Brun, 1792. Grenville's wife painted just before their marriage

Lord Grenville married Anne, daughter of Thomas Pitt, 1st Baron Camelford, in 1792. The marriage was childless and he produced no legitimate offspring during his lifetime. He died in January 1834, aged 74, at which point the barony became extinct.

== Ministry of All the Talents ==
- Lord Grenville – First Lord of the Treasury and Leader of the House of Lords
- Charles James Fox – Foreign Secretary and Leader of the House of Commons
- The Lord Erskine – Lord Chancellor
- The Earl Fitzwilliam – Lord President of the Council
- The Viscount Sidmouth – Lord Privy Seal
- The Earl Spencer – Secretary of State for the Home Department
- William Windham – Secretary of State for War and the Colonies
- Viscount Howick – First Lord of the Admiralty
- Lord Henry Petty – Chancellor of the Exchequer
- The Earl of Moira – Master-General of the Ordnance
- The Lord Ellenborough – Lord Chief Justice of the King's Bench

Changes

- September 1806 – On Fox's death, Lord Howick succeeds him as Foreign Secretary and Leader of the House of Commons. Thomas Grenville succeeds Howick at the Admiralty. Lord Fitzwilliam becomes Minister without Portfolio, and Lord Sidmouth succeeds him as Lord President. Lord Holland succeeds Sidmouth as Lord Privy Seal.

== Honours ==
=== Arms ===
Coat of arms of William Grenville, 1st Baron Grenville
Crest A Garb Vert Escutcheon Quarterly, 1st and 4th, Vert on a Cross Argent five Torteaux (Grenville); 2nd, Or an Eagle displayed Sable (Leofric, Earl of Mercia); 3rd, Argent two Bars Sable each charged with three Martlets Or (Temple) Supporters On the dexter side a Lion per fess embattled Gules and Or and on the sinister side a Horse Argent semé of Eaglets Sable with both supporters collared Argent banded Vert charged with three Torteaux counterchanged Motto Repetens exempla suorum (Following the example set by our forebears)

=== Hereditary Peerage ===
- He was given a Hereditary Peerage in 1790 allowing him to sit in the House of Lords. He sat with the Whig Party Benches. He took the title of 1st Baron Grenville. This title became extinct upon his death in 1834 as he had no surviving heir.

=== British Empire honours ===
British Empire honours

Country	Date	Appointment	Post-nominal letters
Kingdom of Ireland	1782 – 12 January 1834	Member of the Privy Council of Ireland	PC (Ire)
United Kingdom of Great Britain and Ireland	1783 – 12 January 1834	Member of the Privy Council of Great Britain	PC

=== Scholastic ===
Chancellor, visitor, governor, and fellowships

Location	Date	School	Position
England	1809 – 12 January 1834	University of Oxford	Chancellor

=== Memberships and fellowships ===
Country	Date	Organisation	Position
United Kingdom	23 April 1818 – 12 January 1834	Royal Society	Fellow (FRS)

== Notes ==
Political offices
Preceded by Richard FitzPatrick	Chief Secretary for Ireland; 1782–1783	Succeeded by William Windham
Preceded by Edmund Burke	Paymaster of the Forces; 1784–1789	Succeeded by The Lord Mulgrave; The Marquess of Graham
New office	Vice-President of the Board of Trade; 1786–1789	Succeeded by The Marquess of Graham
Preceded by Charles Wolfran Cornwall	Speaker of the House of Commons of Great Britain; 1789	Succeeded by Henry Addington
Preceded by The Lord Sydney	Home Secretary; 1789–1791	Succeeded by Henry Dundas
Preceded by The Lord Sydney	President of the Board of Control; 1790–1793	Succeeded by Henry Dundas
Preceded by The Duke of Leeds	Leader of the House of Lords; 1790–1801	Succeeded by Lord Hobart
Preceded by The Duke of Leeds	Foreign Secretary; 1791–1801	Succeeded by Lord Hawkesbury
Preceded by The Duke of Newcastle	Auditor of the Exchequer; 1794–1834	Succeeded by The Lord Auckland
Preceded by William Pitt the Younger	Prime Minister of the United Kingdom; 11 February 1806 – 25 March 1807	Succeeded by The Duke of Portland
Preceded by Lord Hawkesbury	Leader of the House of Lords; 1806–1807	Succeeded by Lord Hawkesbury
Parliament of Great Britain
Preceded by James Grenville; Richard Aldworth-Neville	Member of Parliament for Buckingham; 1782–1784; With: James Grenville	Succeeded by James Grenville; Charles Edmund Nugent
Preceded by The Earl Verney; Thomas Grenville	Member of Parliament for Buckinghamshire; 1784–1790; With: Sir John Aubrey 1784–1790; The Earl Verney 1790	Succeeded by The Earl Verney; James Grenville
Academic offices
Preceded by The Duke of Portland	Chancellor of the University of Oxford; 1809–1834	Succeeded by The Duke of Wellington
Peerage of Great Britain
New creation	Baron Grenville; 1790–1834	Extinct
