= Sir James Lloyd, 1st Baronet =

English politician (1762–1844)

Sir James Martin Lloyd, 1st Baronet (21 May 1762 – 24 October 1844) was a Sussex landowner, militia officer and long-serving Member of Parliament, who was created a baronet but left no son to inherit the title.

== Family and education ==
Lloyd was born on 21 May 1762, the only son of James Lloyd of Lancing, Sussex and his wife Elizabeth, daughter of Reverend Edward Martin. He was educated at University College, Oxford. He was first married on 20 Jan 1785 to Rebecca, daughter of Reverend William Green, who died on 7 February 1812. They had three daughters, of whom only one survived him. On 10 Nov 1812, he married Elizabeth Anne, daughter of Reverend Colston Carr and sister of Bishop Robert Carr.

== Career ==
He served in the Sussex Militia, becoming a major in 1783 and lieutenant-colonel in 1803.

In 1790 and 1791 he was elected MP for Steyning, but was forced on both occasions to stand down on petition. He regained the seat in 1796, holding it until 1818 with a short break in 1806, during which time he briefly held the office of Clerk of Deliveries of the Ordnance. In 1818 he was offered the neighbouring constituency of New Shoreham for which he sat until 1826. He was created a baronet on 30 September 1831.

== Legacy ==
In 1827 he had bought the manor of Lancing, where his family had owned land since the early eighteenth century, and by 1834 owned four-fifths of the parish. When he died on 24 October 1844, his unmarried daughter Rebecca was his heiress but she died in December 1846. His widow Elizabeth then became heiress and when she died on 4 August 1858 she left the estate to her nephew George Kirwan Carr Lloyd.

Baronetage of the United Kingdom
New creation	Baronet (of Lancing); 1831–1844	Extinct
Preceded by Lawson baronets	Lloyd baronets of Lancing; 30 September 1831	Succeeded by McGrigor baronets
