= William Windham =

British politician

The Right Honourable William Windham
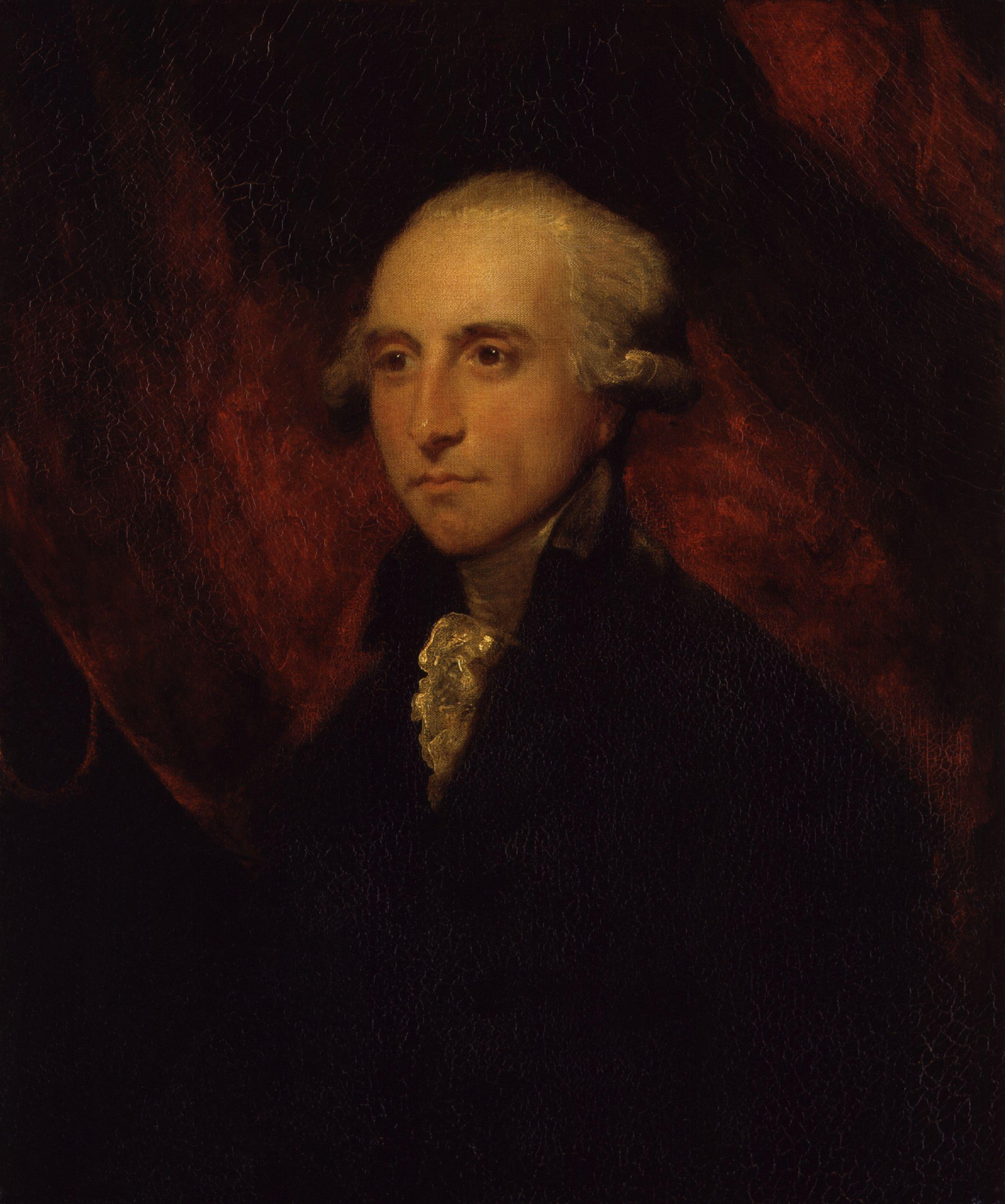
- Portrait by Sir Joshua Reynolds, 1787

Secretary of State for War and the Colonies
- In office 5 February 1806 – 25 March 1807
- Monarch: George III
- Prime Minister: The Lord Grenville
- Preceded by: Viscount Castlereagh
- Succeeded by: Viscount Castlereagh

Secretary at War
- In office 1794–1801
- Monarch: George III
- Prime Minister: William Pitt
- Preceded by: Sir George Yonge, 5th Baronet
- Succeeded by: Charles Philip Yorke

Personal details
- Born: 14 May 1750 London
- Died: 4 June 1810 (aged 60) Pall Mall, London
- Party: Whig

William Windham PC PC (Ire) (14 May [O.S. 3 May] 1750 – 4 June 1810) was a British Whig politician. Elected to Parliament in 1784, Windham was attached to the remnants of the Rockinghamite faction of Whigs, whose members included his friends Charles James Fox and Edmund Burke. Windham soon became noted for his oratory in the House of Commons.

An early supporter of the French Revolution, by late 1791 he shared Burke's hostility to it and became a leading anti-Jacobin. After war was declared on France in early 1793, he broke with the anti-war, pro-Revolution Foxite Whigs to form a small 'Third Party' which was independent of Pitt's government but supportive of the war effort. Like Burke, Windham supported the war as an ideological crusade against Jacobinism and was an enthusiastic supporter of the French émigrés and a Bourbon restoration. In July 1794 he finally joined Pitt's government as Secretary at War but did not control war policy. He discovered that Pitt did not share his enthusiasm for the Bourbon cause and he argued in Cabinet against a peace agreement with the French Republic.

In February 1801 Windham followed Pitt in resigning from the government over the King's rejection of Catholic emancipation. He was the leading opponent of the new prime minister Henry Addington's Treaty of Amiens peace with France in late 1801 and early 1802. In the Ministry of All the Talents in 1806–7, Windham became Secretary for War and the Colonies, having reconciled with the Foxites. Together with them he resigned from the government, again over Catholic Emancipation. He spent the rest of his life in opposition, dying in 1810.

== Early life: 1750–1778 ==
Windham was born in 1750 at No. 6 Golden Square, Soho, London, the son and heir of William Windham, Sr. of Felbrigg Hall, whose ancestors had long been seated in Norfolk, by his second wife, Sarah Lukin. He was a great-great-grandson of Sir John Wyndham of Orchard Wyndham in Somerset, who in 1599 had inherited the Felbrigg estate, the seat of the senior line of the family, from his childless relative Thomas Wyndham.

Windham was educated at Eton College from 1757 to 1766, where he was a contemporary of Charles James Fox and where he was noted for the ease with which he acquired knowledge, and for his success in sports. He became known as "Fighting Windham" as he was good with his fists. His father died in 1761 and his guardians became Benjamin Stillingfleet, Dr. Dampier, David Garrick and a certain Mr. Price of Hereford. At the age of 16 Windham was removed from Eton for fighting.

Windham attended the University of Glasgow in 1766 and studied under Dr. Anderson, Professor of Natural Philosophy, and Robert Simson the mathematician. Windham wrote three unpublished theses on mathematics. He then attended University College, Oxford, from 1767 to 1771 as a gentleman-commoner, where he was tutored by Robert Chambers. According to Edmond Malone, Windham "was highly distinguished for his application to various studies, for his love of enterprise, for that frank and graceful address, and that honourable deportment, which gave a lustre to his character though every period of his life". He took his BA degree in 1771, his MA on 7 October 1782, and was awarded a DCL at the Duke of Portland's installation as chancellor. He made a tour of Norway in 1773 and visited Switzerland and Italy between 1778 and 1780.

Windham was a Christian. Before he took a balloon ride, he wrote to George James Cholmondeley on 4 May 1785 a letter that was only to be delivered if he did not survive the trip. It contained Windham's confession of faith:

The best, the greatest, the most solemn office I can render in a letter of this sort, is to extort you to a steady contemplation of divine truths, and a sincere endeavour to confirm in yourself that faith, which after various fluctuations I believe to be the true one, and which, independent of evidence, is supported by too great authorities ever to be rejected with confidence. Whatever may be the diversity of opinion as to the particular nature, I believe Christ to be a person divinely commissioned, and that faith in him affords the fairest hope of propitiating the great author of the world. Cultivate in your mind this persuasion and dwell upon it till it grows into a principle of action. May it avail both to the purposes of final salvation.

== Early political career: 1778–1789 ==
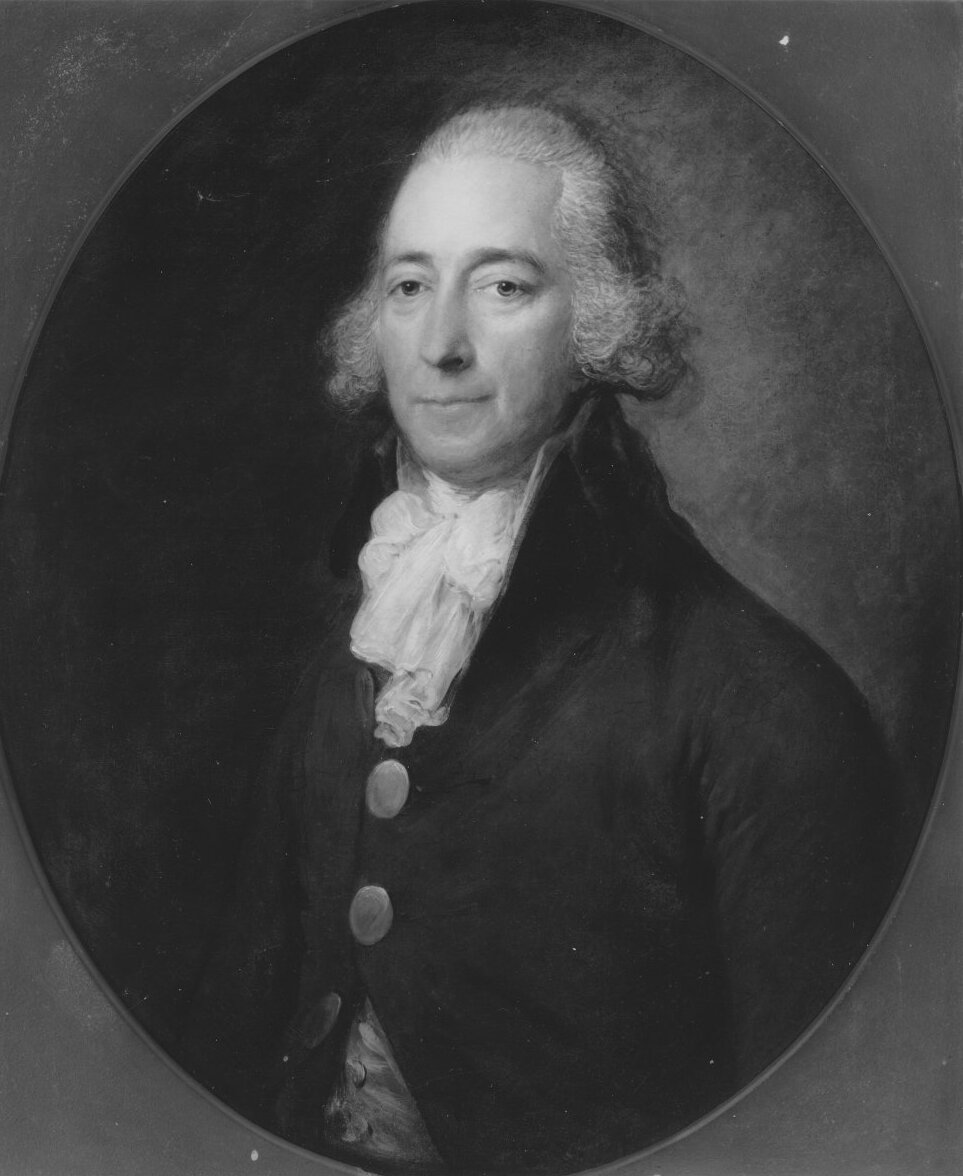
1780s portrait of Windham by Gainsborough Dupont

In early 1778 Windham first took part in political matters. He felt strongly about the American War of Independence, writing to Richard Brinsley Sheridan on 5 January that "I never felt so much disposition to exert myself before". On 28 January Windham delivered in Norwich his first public speech, where he spoke against the war, and a few days later he wrote a remonstrance against it which was signed by 5,000 people and was presented to the House of Commons. His speech went down well and he was urged to stand for election. Windham stood unsuccessfully for Norwich in the election of September 1780.

When in 1783 the Duke of Portland formed an administration, he appointed Lord Northington as Lord-Lieutenant of Ireland. Northington offered Windham the office of Chief Secretary for Ireland, which he accepted. However, after only four months in the post, Windham resigned under mysterious circumstances. His contemporaneous diary did record his distrust in his own powers, and disappointment at his limited achievements; he was also probably unwell at the time.

On 5 April 1784 Windham was elected to Parliament for Norwich, a seat he would hold until 1802. He took part in the Impeachment of Warren Hastings and his speeches against him on 1 June 1787 and 22 March 1787 were admired. Though Windham opposed all proposals for parliamentary reform, to which most of the Whigs were committed, he remained in alliance with that party until after the outbreak of the French Revolution.

During the Regency Crisis of 1788–89 he spoke in favour of granting George, Prince of Wales full regal powers as Regent. He wrote on 26 November 1788: "If the King of a country is completely out of his mind, whatever sorrow may be felt for that event, the extent of the evil is, however, known: It is, for the time it lasts, just as if the King were dead. The same person must, upon all principles of reason, and all views of the Constitution, carry on the Government, as if the King were actually dead—should he again be restored completely to his senses, the case is then equally clear: he must be restored completely to his government".

== French Revolution: 1789–1794 ==
From 12 August 1789 until 6 September, Windham toured France. Upon his return, Windham sent his friend and fellow Whig MP Edmund Burke some books (recommended by a Deputy of the National Assembly) on the general state of public opinion in France in the aftermath of the beginnings of the French Revolution. Windham wrote to Burke on 15 September, saying: "My notion has been from the beginning, and is not altered by what I have seen or heard, that the new Constitution will be settled without a struggle. Whether perfect quiet and satisfaction may be established in the country is another question: but it does not appear to me, that there is any near prospect of civil commotion.—Any opinion, however, which I can have upon the subject is, of course, very vague conjecture."

When Henry Flood introduced a motion for parliamentary reform on 4 March 1790, Windham famously said: "What, would Mr. Flood recommend you to repair your house in this hurricane season?"

After reading Burke's Reflections on the Revolution in France in November 1790, Windham wrote in his diary: "Never was there, I suppose, a work so valuable in its kind, or that displayed powers of so extraordinary a sort. It is a work that may seem capable of overturning the National Assembly, and turning the stream of opinion throughout Europe. One would think, that the author of such a work, would be called to the government of his country, by the combined voices of every man in it. What shall be said of the state of things when it is remembered that the writer is a man decried, persecuted, and proscribed; not being much valued, even by his own party, and by half the nation considered as little better than an ingenious madman?"

Windham travelled to Paris in September 1791 and he was present at the ceremony in the National Assembly where King Louis XVI accepted the new constitution of France. Windham wrote to Mrs. Crewe that the ceremony was "necessarily humiliating...there was somewhat too much of "la nation," and somewhat too little of "le Roi"." Windham wished they had been more courteous and added: "I hope that we shall be the people to keep up a little of the "vielle cour" in our manners, while we lose nothing of the solid advantages and privileges that the new system can promise". In May 1792 Windham wrote to a friend on his opposition to parliamentary reform: "I have in general been far from adverse to the principles and cause of the French Revolution. So much otherwise indeed, that from the beginning almost, Mr. Burke and I have never exchanged a word on the subject. But when an attempt is made to bring the same principles home to us, Principles in a great measure extravagant and false and which at best have no practical application here, I shall ever prove myself as violent an opposer of them as Mr. Burke or any one can be".

Windham supported the Royalist uprising in La Vendée and he urged the British government to aid them with the aim of restoring the House of Bourbon to the throne: "I would, from the beginning, have made this the principal object of the war".

In a speech to the Commons, on 30 April 1792, he declared that he would unite with any body of men "who were determined to set their faces against every endeavour to subvert the true principles of the constitution". On 13 November Windham and Burke met Pitt and hinted they and their fellow conservative Whigs would support strong measures; however, Pitt desired "more certain and definite assurances of support from the heads of the party before the meeting of parliament". He still had reservations about completely separating from Fox and he denied in the Commons (on 15 December) that they differed in principles. However, as he said in the Commons on 4 January 1793, he was no longer a systematic opposer of the government.

In the aftermath of the execution of Louis XVI, Parliament met in February 1793. Fox and his supporters excused France's actions short of supporting the execution and Fox claimed that the British monarchy was elective and that sovereignty resided with the people. On 9 February war was declared on France and the conservative Whigs met the next day. They decided that a reunion with the Foxites was now out of the question and that they would now call themselves the "Third Party". This faction consisted of only approximately 38 MPs (26 of whom were members of the Whig party), with less than one-fifth of the Whigs as members.

In the opinion of the historian Frank O'Gorman, if the Pitt government was to be persuaded to adopt the only anti-Jacobin policies that would be effective, "Windham was the only politician who might seriously undertake to accomplish these ends":

He was possessed of distinguished talents and a disposition so compelling as to endear him to all. The power of his intelligence was disguised by his self-effacing manner as a reserve of strength and firmness which he did not in reality possess. His talents and his nature, allied to unquestioned integrity, gave him a reputation and a standing among his contemporaries which was, perhaps, second only to that of Fox. It was not by accident that Windham was able to rally to him some of the most respectable independents in the House of Commons. Nevertheless, he was peculiarly ill-suited to the role which he was now called upon to play in...1793. He was daunted with the prospect of assuming responsibility for matters of state by the doubts and fears which gnawed away at the determination he could summon in his rare moments of enthusiasm and exuberance. Once his energy had been overcome by the exhaustion of his spirits, he would fall away into lethargy, despair and pessimism. Having formed the "Third Party", he promptly excused himself from leading it. Having committed its members to a distinct support of administration, he escaped to the solitude of Fellbrig, in spite of "the possibility of having lost an opportunity of distinction". He consoled his conscience by toying with the preparation of speeches which he never delivered while he ruminated on his inability to act out the part which he himself had chosen.

On 17 June Pitt offered Windham the office of Secretary at War. In a speech in the Commons that same day, Windham supported Pitt, arguing that intervention in French affairs might become a necessity if a government was formed in Paris "as we might with safety treat with". However, on 19 June he informed Pitt that he would decline his offer, although he added that he might accept office "sometime hence". From 12 July until 6 August, he was in Flanders. Windham was the contact between the conservative Whigs and the government; however, he was still at this time hesitant about joining Pitt's government.

In January 1794 began the trials of the leaders of the British Convention. In response, the radicals proposed another such convention. Therefore, the government decided to arrest leading radicals such as Thomas Hardy. On 13 May, the day after Hardy's arrest, the Commons voted to appoint a Committee of Secrecy to devise the measures necessary to counter a new convention. Windham was appointed to the committee, along with Burke (and other conservative Whigs and government supporters), much to Fox's chagrin.

The Duke of Portland, on 3 July, urged Windham that, if he took up Pitt's offer of the Secretaryship at War, he could make it "a real efficient Cabinet employment". His friend, Tom Grenville, met Windham that day and he succeeded in persuading Windham to accept office; Portland was therefore able to negotiate with the King a coalition government between the conservative Whigs and Pitt's government.

== Secretary at War: 1794–1801 ==
Windham was now Secretary at War in Pitt's government; at the same time, he was created a privy councillor. He provided subsidies for the émigrés, sponsored anti-Jacobin propaganda, and achieved Cabinet support for the ill-fated Quiberon expedition. Windham sometimes met with royalist leaders, such as Comte Joseph-Geneviève de Puisaye and Jacques Anne Joseph Le Prestre, Marquis of Vauban.

In practice, Windham made himself responsible for all matters related to the Royalists but in the spring of 1796 he relinquished his sole responsibility for this as he was frustrated by the need to constantly refer to other departments whenever he wanted to do something that would help the Royalists. He realised that other Cabinet members did not share his enthusiasm for the Royalist cause and for a Bourbon restoration.

In late 1795 the government decided to negotiate peace with France and, although he had consistently opposed negotiations until a decisive victory was achieved, Windham agreed that France remaining a republic should be no obstacle to this. However, by October 1796, Windham had changed his mind, writing to Mrs Crewe: "If I could have been sure that Lord Malmesbury's despicable embassy would succeed and that peace must be the immediate consequence, I should have been out long since".

In the dispute between Fitzwilliam and Pitt over Ireland, Windham supported Fitzwilliam and threatened to resign if better policies for governing Ireland were not adopted. Windham acted as the mediator between the two sides.

In the aftermath of the Irish Rebellion of 1798, Windham supported the union of Ireland with Great Britain, believing that Catholic emancipation would follow. On 7 February 1801 Windham was among those who resigned in protest at the King's veto of Catholic emancipation.

== Opposition: 1801–1806 ==
Immediately after the Peace of Amiens was signed, the Prime Minister, Henry Addington, wrote to Windham on 1 October 1801: "I think when I see you...I can satisfy you that it is not clear even upon your own Principles that we are wrong". Windham replied to Addington on the same day:

I can have no idea of the measure in question but as the commencement of a career which, by an easy descent, and step by step, but at no very distant period, will conduct the country to a situation where, when it looks at last for its independence, it will find that it is already gone. I have no idea how the effect of this measure is ever to be recover'd; Chance may do much, but, according to any conception I can form, the Country has received its death blow.

When the preliminaries of the Treaty were debated in the Commons on 3 November 1801, Windham gave a speech that was, according to A. D. Harvey, "the sensation of the evening". He said Addington and Lord Hawkesbury "in a moment of rashness and weakness, have fatally put their hands to this treaty, have signed the death-warrant of their country. They have given it a blow, under which it may languish for a few years, but from which I do not conceive how it is possible for it ever to recover". According to The Times Windham sat on "the same bench from which Mr. Burke always spoke after separating from Mr. Fox" and an observer said he spoke "like the ghost of Burke". One contemporary said Windham possessed Burke's insanity without his inspiration. When Charles James Fox visited France during the Peace of Amiens he conversed with Napoleon Bonaparte (on 23 September 1802). Napoleon said he believed Windham's "talents were mediocre and that he was an unfeeling, unprincipled man". Fox immediately defended Windham but Napoleon countered: "It is easy for you who only know public debate. But for me, I detest him and that Pitt who together have attempted my life". Fox assured Napoleon that "Mr Pitt and Mr Windham, like every other Englishman, would shrink with horror from the idea of secret assassination".

When Windham lost the Norwich election in June 1802, a seat for the pocket borough of St Mawes in Cornwall was found for him. In May 1804 he declined a place in Pitt's new cabinet on the ground that the exclusion of Fox prevented the formation of an administration strong enough to cope with the dangers which threatened the nation, and he offered a general opposition to the measures that Pitt proposed. William Hazlitt apparently had it on somewhat good authority that Pitt had hated Windham. Windham in turn did not attend Pitt's funeral at Westminster Abbey after his death in January 1806.

== Secretary of State for War and the Colonies: 1806–1807 ==
On 5 February 1806 Windham received the seals of office to become Secretary of State for War and the Colonies in Lord Grenville's Ministry of All the Talents.

Windham abolished the ballot for the militia to ensure that only volunteers manned the militia. He also wanted to solve the Army's recruiting shortage by limiting service in the Army to seven years. He increased soldiers' wages from 1 shilling to 1s. 6d. if they re-enlisted after the seven years, and to 2 shillings if they re-enlisted after fourteen years. He also introduced pensions for old soldiers. The Training Act 1806 empowered the government to conscript 200,000 Englishmen a year for twenty four days' military training, although it was not enforced.

A general election took place in November 1806, and Windham was elected for the county of Norfolk, but the election was declared void on petition. Instead, he sat for the borough of New Romney, to which he had also been elected.

== Opposition: 1807–1810 ==
In 1807, when parliament was dissolved, a seat was found for Windham at Higham Ferrers. As he had throughout, he supported liberty of religious opinion, and with equal consistency he opposed all outbreaks of religious fanaticism; hence with these convictions in his mind he approved few of the domestic measures of the new ministers.

Windham also opposed the Walcheren Expedition of 1809, believing instead that the forces sent there "should have been sent to Spain, so as not to leave Buonaparte, when he has settled the Austrian business, to begin, as he did last year, on the banks of the Ebro, but to have driven the whole of the French force out of the peninsula". Writing to Charles Grey in September 1809, Windham voiced his opposition to peace with France, even though Wellington had been driven from Spain back into Portugal. He further argued that "the great thing that is wanted is resistance to the strides that are making, in concurrence with the general tendency of things throughout the world, to turn the country into a democracy".

== Support for Old English sports ==
Windham was opposed to the evangelical movement and their attempt to outlaw traditional English sports: "Few subjects agitated...Windham...more than the puritanical and Wilberforcian assault on the traditional sports of Englishmen such as boxing and bull-baiting. Windham's speeches in parliament in defense of such practices seem among his most heart-felt". William Wilberforce wrote to Hannah More—a leading evangelical moralist—on 15 November 1804: "I really think there scarcely ever were, or can be, two men more different from each other in all their ideas than Windham and myself". Windham said that Wilberforce would delight in sending aristocrats to the guillotine.

In the aftermath of the British victory over the French at the Battle of Talavera, Windham wrote on the subject of boxing in a letter to a friend dated 17 August 1809:

Why are we to boast so much of the native valour of our troops, as shewn at Talavera, at Vimeira, and at Maida, yet to discourage all the practices and habits which tend to keep alive the same sentiments and feelings? The sentiments that filled the minds of the three thousand spectators who attended the two pugilists, were just the same in kind as those which inspired the higher combatants on the occasions before enumerated. It is the circumstance only in which they are displayed, that makes the difference. ... Bravery is found in all habits, classes, circumstances, and conditions. But have habits and institutions of one sort no tendency to form it, more than of another? Longevity is found in persons of habits the most opposite: but are not certain habits more favourable to it than others? The courage does not arise from mere boxing, from the mere beating or being beat:—but from the sentiments excited by the contemplation and cultivation of such practices. Will it make no difference in the mass of a people, whether their amusements are all of a pacific, pleasurable, and effeminate nature, or whether they are of a sort that calls forth a continued admiration of prowess and hardihood? But when I get on these topicks, I never know how to stop...

== Death ==
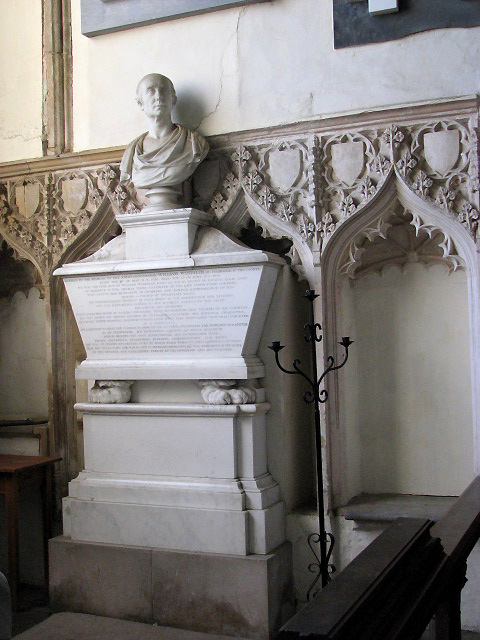
Monument to William Windham in Felbrigg Church, with marble bust by Joseph Nollekens (a copy by Sebastian Gahagan is in Felbrigg Hall)

On 8 July 1809, Windham was returning to Pall Mall, London from a friend's when he saw a house on fire in Conduit Street. His friend Frederick North lived a few doors away from the burning house and possessed a valuable library. Therefore, with the aid of two or three men, Windham succeeded in removing most of the books before the fire reached North's house. However, when removing some heavy books, he fell and bruised his hip. After a tumour grew in the hip he received medical help but this was ineffectual. On 6 May 1810 the surgeon Henry Cline advised him that an operation was imperative, an opinion shared by four of the six physicians Windham consulted. Before the operation Windham went to some trouble to receive the Sacrament. Cline performed the operation on 17 May and, although it was successful, Windham did not recover from the shock. His last words were to Dr. Lynn, who moved him into a more comfortable position on the night of 3 June: "I thank you; this is the last trouble I shall give you. You fight the battle well, but it will not do". Not long after, he fell asleep and died in the presence of his wife. On 8 June, Windham's body was transported to the family vault at Felbrigg, with a private funeral. In the church window Windham's widow installed a memorial brass with the inscription:

Sacred to the Memory of the Right Honourable William Windham, of Felbrigge, in this County. Born the 14th of May, O.S. 1750, Died the 4th of June, N.S. 1810. He was the only son of William Windham, esqre., by Sarah, relict of Robert Lukin, esqre. He married in 1798 Cecilia, third daughter of the late Commodore Forrest; who erects this Monument in grateful and tender remembrance of him. During a period of twenty-six years he distinguished himself in Parliament by his eloquence and talents; and was repeatedly called to the highest offices of the State. His views and councils were directed more to raising the glory than increasing the wealth of his country. He was above all things anxious to preserve untainted the National Character, and even those National Manners which long habit had associated with that character. As a Statesman, he laboured to exalt the courage, to improve the comforts, and ennoble the profession of a Soldier: As an individual, he exhibited a model of those qualities which denote the most accomplished and enlightened mind. Frank, generous, unassuming, intrepid, compassionate, and pious, he was so highly respected, even by those from whom he most differed in opinion, that, tho' much of his life had passed in political contention, he was accompanied to the grave by the sincere and unqualified regret of his Sovereign and his Country.

== Legacy ==
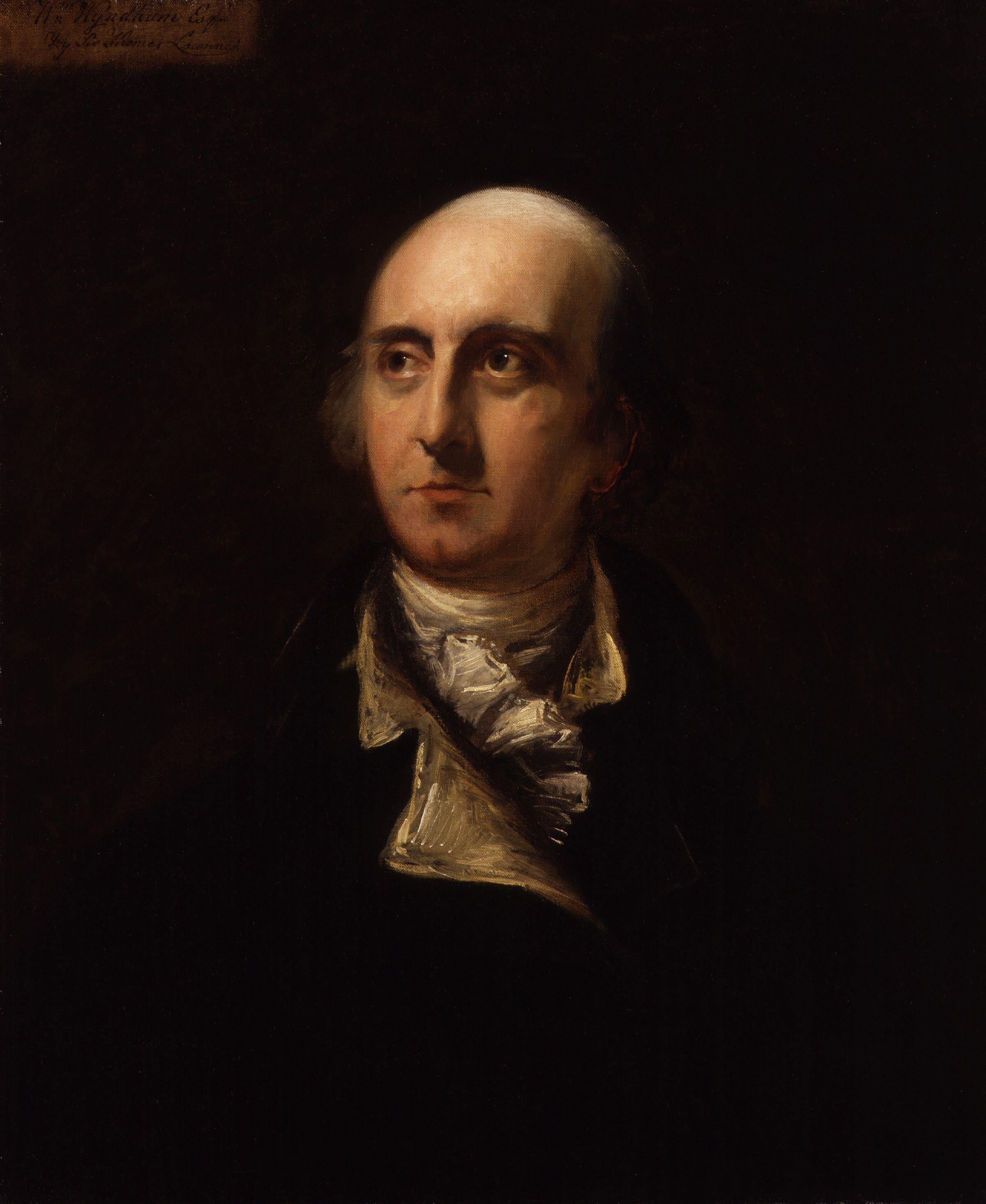
William Windham by Sir Thomas Lawrence.

Windham was greatly influenced by the Whig philosopher Edmund Burke, describing Burke's words as "the source of all good". The Foxite Whig, Lord Holland, considered Burke "the great god of his idolatry".

Samuel Johnson said of Windham after conversing with him: "Such conversation I shall not have again till I come back to the regions of literature; and there Windham is, inter stellas Luna minores ['the Moon among the lesser fires.' Horace, Odes i. xii. 46.]".

Sir James Mackintosh wrote to a friend after meeting Windham in March 1800: "His conversation is full of sense, knowledge and vivacity and his manners very gentle. We talked with equal enthusiasm of Burke and with equal abhorrence of Democrats and Philosophers". Upon hearing of Windham's death, Mackintosh said: "Had Windham possessed discretion in debate, or Sheridan in conduct, they might have ruled their age".

Sir Nathaniel William Wraxall claimed Windham was:

...one of the most accomplished orators and individuals whom we have beheld in our day...His person was graceful, elegant, and distinguished; slender, but not meagre. The lineaments of his countenance, though they displayed the ravages of the smallpox, were pleasing, and retained a character of animation, blended with spirit and intelligence. Over his whole figure, nature had thrown an air of mind. His manners corresponded with his external appearance; and his conversation displayed the treasures of a highly cultivated understanding. Ardent in his love of civil liberty, for the preservation of which blessing, I believe, he would as cheerfully have shed his blood as did Hampden or Sidney; it was constitutional freedom that he venerated, not a republican and impracticable emancipation from limited monarchial government...To Burke, Windham unquestionably bore some analogy; and on his shoulders may be said to have descended the mantle of Burke...Windham's talents, brilliant and various as they were, always however appeared to me more adapted to speculative, than to practical life.

Henry Brougham said of Windham:

...a lively wit of the most pungent and yet abstruse description, a turn for subtle reasoning ... familiarity with men of letters and artists as well as politicians...a singularly expressive countenance—all fitted this remarkable person to shine ... [but] he was too often the dupe of his own ingenuity; which made him doubt and balance ... His nature ... was to be a follower, if not a worshipper, rather than an original thinker or actor ... Accordingly, first Johnson in private and afterwards Burke on political matters were the deities whom he adored.

The Whig historian Thomas Macaulay, in his essay on Warren Hastings that he wrote in 1841, praised Windham: "There, with eyes reverentially fixed on Burke, appeared the finest gentleman of the age, his form developed by every manly exercise, his face beaming with intelligence and spirit, the ingenious, the chivalrous, the high-souled Windham".

Lord Rosebery edited Windham's papers in 1913, and said Windham was:

...the finest English gentleman of his or perhaps of all time. Had he lived in the great days of Elizabeth, he would have been one of the heroes of her reign...He was a statesman, an orator, a mathematician, a scholar, and the most fascinating talker of his day...A noble gentleman in the highest sense of the word, full of light, intellect, and dignity, loved and lamented. His best qualities, no doubt, as is often the case, he carried almost to excess; for his cherished independence he led to a morbid craving for isolation. But to the charge of vacillation in public affairs he was not obnoxious; he was always true to his faith. But he chose his masters well, Johnson and Burke; the one gave him his religious, the other his political creed. In life he was brilliant and successful. In oratory, in parliament, in society, he was almost supreme. But he can scarcely be said to survive. He left no stamp, no school, no work. To those, however, who care to disinter his memory he displays character and qualities of excellence, rare at all times, rarest in these.

F. P. Lock has described Windham as "a Norfolk squire of uncommon intellectual gifts and great personal charm. His great failing was chronic indecision". Boyd Hilton said Windham "was the first in a line of brilliant but maverick right-wing politicians—Lyndhurst, Randolph Churchill, F. E. Smith—who operated too far outside the consensus to be effective. He had a scintillating personality, and political convictions so strong that they belied his otherwise scholarly and discriminating characteristics, but he lacked judgement and had a streak of melancholic instability".

Windham, a lost early hamlet in Richmond Hill, Ontario, Canada was named for Windham.

== Notes ==
Parliament of Great Britain
Preceded by Edward Bacon; Sir Harbord Harbord, Bt	Member of Parliament for Norwich; 1784–1801; With: Sir Harbord Harbord, Bt 1784–1786; Henry Hobart 1786–1799; John Frere 1799–1801	Succeeded by Parliament of the United Kingdom
Parliament of the United Kingdom
Preceded by Parliament of Great Britain	Member of Parliament for Norwich; 1801–1802; With: John Frere	Succeeded by Robert Fellowes; William Smith
Preceded by Sir William Young, Bt; Jeremiah Crutchley	Member of Parliament for St Mawes; 1802–1806; With: Sir William Young, Bt	Succeeded by Sir John Newport, Bt; Scrope Bernard
Preceded by John Willett Willett; Manasseh Lopes	Member of Parliament for New Romney; 1806–1807; With: John Perring	Succeeded by The Earl of Clonmell; Hon. George Ashburnham
Preceded by Thomas Coke; Jacob Henry Astley	Member of Parliament for Norfolk; 1806–1807; With: Thomas William Coke	Succeeded by Edward Coke; Jacob Henry Astley
Preceded by Francis Ferrand Foljambe	Member of Parliament for Higham Ferrers; 1807–1810	Succeeded by Viscount Duncannon
Political offices
Preceded by William Wyndham Grenville	Chief Secretary for Ireland; 1783	Succeeded by Thomas Pelham
Preceded by Sir George Yonge, Bt.	Secretary at War; 1794–1801	Succeeded by Charles Philip Yorke
Preceded by Viscount Castlereagh	Secretary of State for War and the Colonies; 1806–1807	Succeeded by Viscount Castlereagh
