= John Patteson (1755–1833) =

English Tory politician (1755–1833)

- Born: 19 November 1755; Norwich, Norfolk, England
- Died: 3 October 1833 (aged 77); Norwich, Norfolk, England
- Spouse: Elizabeth Staniforth
- Children: 2, including John Staniforth Patteson

John Patteson (19 November 1755 – 3 October 1833) was an English Tory politician.

He was the son of brewer Henry Sparke Patteson and Martha Fromansteel (daughter of Daniel Fromanteel) of Norwich and educated in Greenwich and Leipzig (1768).

He was an Alderman in Norwich from 1781 to 1831, served as sheriff for 1785 and mayor for 1788. He was elected at the 1802 general election as a Member of Parliament (MP) for Minehead in Somerset. He held the seat until the 1806 general election, when he was returned as an MP for Norwich. He was re-elected for Norwich in 1807 and held the seat until his defeat at the 1812 general election.

He was President of the Norwich Union Life Assurance Society from 1815 to his death in 1833. He had married Elizabeth, the daughter of Robert Staniforth of Manchester and heiress of William Staniforth (d.1786). They had 3 sons and 3 daughters.

John was also a noted brewery owner, purchasing Charles Greeves' brewery in 1793. This eventually became Steward & Patteson. His son John Staniforth Patteson was mayor of Norwich. Another of John’s sons was Robert Dossie Patteson, a soldier in the Peninsular War. Robert was wounded and fell at Fort Erie in 1814.

Parliament of the United Kingdom
Preceded by John Langston; John Fownes Luttrell	Member of Parliament for Minehead; 1802 – 1806; With: John Fownes Luttrell	Succeeded by Lord Rancliffe; Sir John Lethbridge, Bt
Preceded by William Smith; Robert Fellowes	Member of Parliament for Norwich; 1806 – 1812; With: Robert Fellowes to 1807; William Smith from 1807	Succeeded by Charles Harvey; William Smith
