= Robert Fellowes (politician) =

English politician

Robert Fellowes M.P.
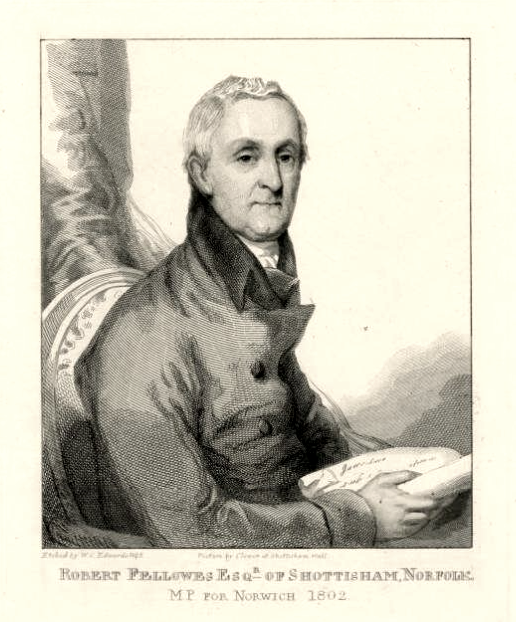
- Portrait of Robert Fellowes, after Joseph Clover
- Born: 1742
- Died: 1829 (aged 86–87)
- Occupations: charity treasurer, politician
- Father: William Fellowes, the "Man of Shotesham"

Robert Fellowes (1742–1829) was an English politician, Member of Parliament for Norwich from 1802 to 1807.

== Life ==
He was the second son of William Fellowes of Shotesham Park, Norfolk and his wife Elizabeth. He was educated in Acton, and at Emmanuel College, Cambridge, where he matriculated in 1759, graduating B.A. in 1764. William Fellowes (1740–1778) was his elder brother, and his son Robert Fellowes (1770–1847) his nephew.

In 1769 Fellowes was travelling in Italy. He arrived at Venice in September of that year with Thomas Durrant, of Scottow, Member of Parliament for St Ives.

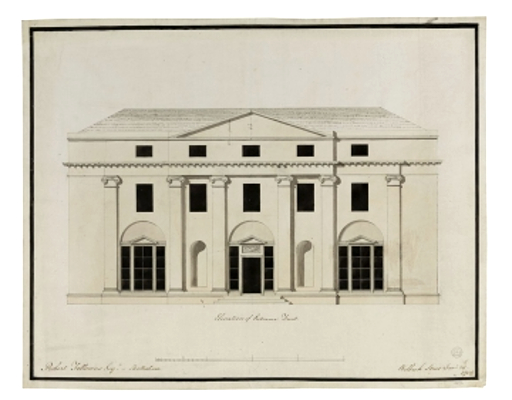
The Hall, Shotesham Park, 1789 drawing from the office of John Soane, close to final design for the entrance elevation

Fellowes succeeded to the position of treasurer to the Norfolk and Norwich Hospital on his father's death in 1775, and held it to 1803. Shotesham was enclosed in 1781. The Fellowes family grew the estate over the years, using non-agricultural income to purchase land. In 1872 it was 7,758 acres (3,140 ha) as originally purchased in 1721 the land had been 871 acres (352 ha)

Fellowes had the Hall at Shotesham Park rebuilt by John Soane, in the period from 1785. It was on a new site, about a mile from the old house.

In 1816 Fellowes was one of the founders of the Norwich Savings Bank, with the former Norwich mayor John Hammond Cole, becoming the Bank's President.

== In politics ==
In 1799 Henry Hobart, one of the Members of Parliament for Norwich, died. At the by-election that followed, Fellowes stood as a candidate opposed to the Pitt administration, but lost to John Frere, backed by William Windham, despite support from the Gurney family in the person of Bartlett Gurney. In the 1802 general election, he stood again and topped the poll in the two-member constituency, with the radical William Smith coming second, and Windham and Frere kept out. He was elected again in 1806, coming second to the Tory John Patteson, but was defeated in 1807, coming third to Patteson and Smith.

In parliament Fellowes took an independent line, earning the nickname "Bob-of-both-sides". He voted sometimes with the Foxites, but was unpopular with the liberal Whigs as lacking consistency.

== Family ==
Fellowes married in 1776 Ann Berney, daughter of John Berney of Bracon Hall. They had six sons and six daughters.

The sons included:

- Robert Fellowes (died 1869). He married, firstly in 1812, Sarah Williams (died 1814), daughter of the Rev. John Henry Williams. They had a daughter, Marianne, married in 1839 George Acklom, son of the cavalry officer Robert Evatt Acklom, who became a cleric. His second wife was Jane Louisa Sheldon, daughter of Ralph Sheldon, Member of Parliament for Wilton. Their daughter Louisa married in 1835 Thomas Gladstone; their daughter Fanny married in 1851 Edward Howes as his second wife; and their daughter Margaret married in 1854 William Mansfield.
- Henry Fellowes (1783–1862). He was grandfather of the musical scholar Edmund Fellowes.
- Rev. John Fellowes (1785–1838).

Of the daughters:

- Elizabeth (died 1817, aged 29), fourth daughter, married the Rev. George Howes, and was mother of Edward Howes who married, as his second wife, Fanny Fellowes above. There were three sons and a daughter of the marriage. George Howes married, secondly, Maria Margaret Blake (died 1820), daughter of the barrister Thomas Blake (1755–1813), and they had a son Frederick.
