= William Smith (abolitionist) =

British politician and abolitionist

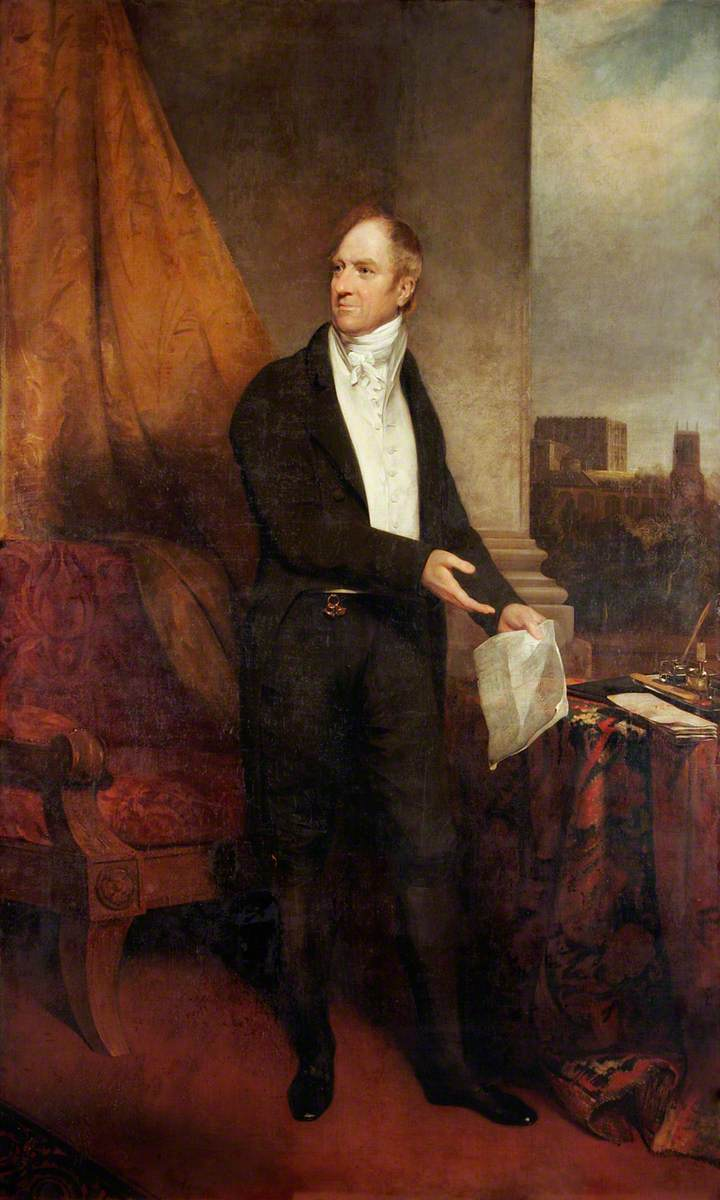
- William Smith
- Born: William Smith; 22 September 1756; Clapham (then a village south of London)
- Died: 31 May 1835 (aged 78); London, England
- Occupation: Politician
- Years active: 1782 – c. 1825
- Known for: Social justice, prison reform
- Notable work: campaigns for abolition of slavery
- Spouse: Frances Coape (m.1781)
- Children: 8, including Benjamin Smith
- Relatives: Barbara Bodichon (granddaughter) Benjamin Leigh Smith (grandson) Florence Nightingale (granddaughter)

William Smith (22 September 1756 – 31 May 1835) was a leading independent British politician, sitting as Member of Parliament (MP) for more than one constituency. He was an English Dissenter and was instrumental in bringing political rights to that religious minority. He was a friend and close associate of William Wilberforce and a member of the Clapham Sect of social reformers, and was in the forefront of many of their campaigns for social justice, prison reform and philanthropic endeavour, most notably the abolition of slavery. He was the grandfather of pioneer nurse and statistician Florence Nightingale and educationalist Barbara Bodichon, a founder of Girton College, Cambridge.

== Early life ==
William Smith was born on 22 September 1756 at Clapham (then a village to the south of London), the only son of Samuel Smith by Martha, daughter of William Adams of London. Brought up by parents who worshipped at an Independent chapel, he was educated at the dissenting academy at Daventry until 1772, where he began to come under the influence of Unitarians. He went into the family grocery business and by 1777 had become a partner. Smith had a long career as a social and political reformer, joining the Society for Constitutional Information in 1782.

== Election to parliament ==
In 1784 Smith was elected as one of the two Members of Parliament for Sudbury in Suffolk. He was active in his support for the Whigs while in opposition. In 1790 he lost his seat at Sudbury and in the following January was elected as one of the members for Camelford. In 1796 he was again returned for Sudbury, but in 1802 accepted the invitation of radicals to stand for Norwich, although he was defeated in the election of 1806, which was fought on a local issue. However, enough Whigs were elected to form the next government, led by Lord Grenville. Smith was returned again in 1807 and 1812 and became a popular and outspoken radical Member of Parliament for Norwich, which was known for being a gathering place for dissenters and radicals of all kinds.

== Unitarianism ==
William Smith held strong dissenting Christian convictions – he was a Unitarian, and was thus prevented from attaining the Great Offices of State. (The doctrine of Unitarians was to deny the Trinity, a central tenet of the Church of England.) He nevertheless played a leading role in most of the great contemporary parliamentary issues, including the Dissenters' demands for the repeal of the Test and Corporation Acts (for the first time since the 1730s). Although the campaigners were unsuccessful in 1787, they tried again in 1789. When Charles Fox introduced a bill for the relief of Nontrinitarianism in May 1792, Smith supported the Unitarian Society, publicly declaring his commitment to the Unitarian cause. The same year he became one of the founding members of the Friends of the People Society. In 1813 Smith challenged the established church, and was responsible for championing the Doctrine of the Trinity Act 1813, known as 'Mr William Smith's Bill', which, for the first time, made it legal to practice Unitarianism. He was a member of the Essex Street Chapel.

== Abolitionism ==
In June 1787, Smith was one of the first to campaign for the abolition of the slave trade, becoming a vocal advocate for the cause. In 1790 he supported William Wilberforce in the slave trade debate in April. While he had been out of parliament he had given his support to Abolitionism by writing a pamphlet entitled A Letter to William Wilberforce (1807), in which he cogently and convincingly summarised the abolitionists' arguments for abolition. Once the trade had been halted, he turned his attention to freeing those who were already slaves. In 1823 with Zachary Macaulay he helped found the London Society for the Abolition of Slavery in our Colonies, thereby launching the next phase of the campaign to eradicate slavery.

== French Revolution ==
In the beginning, at least, William Smith was sympathetic to the revolutionary movement in France. He visited Paris in 1790, where he attended the 14 July celebrations, and later recorded his reactions to the momentous events he witnessed. In April 1791 he publicly supported the aims and principles of the newly formed Unitarian Society, including support for the recently won liberty of the French (see Revolution Controversy). Smith was swiftly gaining a reputation as a radical, even a Jacobin, becoming known as "King-Killer Smith" in allusion to the execution of Louis XVI, which he had defended in Parliament on grounds that the cruelty of the revolutionaries was equalled by that of previous French monarchs. Because he had business contacts and friends in Paris, he was more than once asked to act as a go-between for the government. In 1792 he arranged several meetings between William Pitt and Hugues-Bernard Maret, later Napoleon's foreign minister, in an attempt to avoid war.

== Later life ==
He was elected a Fellow of the Royal Society in 1806 as "a Gentleman well versed in various branches of Natural Knowledge".

As an MP, Smith witnessed the assassination of prime minister Spencer Perceval who fell close by him. He immediately identified his body on sight of his face, having initially thought it was William Wilberforce who had been shot.

Smith finally saw through parliament the repeal of the Test Acts in 1828. He died on 31 May 1835 in London, at the age of 78.

== Family ==
On 12 September 1781 Smith married Frances Coape (1758 – 1840), daughter of John and Hannah Coape, both Dissenters. They had five sons and five daughters.

- Martha Frances (1782–1870, known as Patty)
- Benjamin Smith, (1783–1860) the Whig politician. He lived in a loving partnership with Anne Longden (1801-1834) but did not marry as Smith viewed marriage laws as unfair for women. They had five children, including Barbara Bodichon, founder of Girton College, and the explorer Benjamin Leigh Smith.
- Anne (1785–1854) married George Thomas Nicholson.
- William Adams Smith (1789–1870), was known as an activist.
- Frances Smith (1789–1880), married William Nightingale and was the mother of Florence Nightingale.
- Joanna Maria (1791–1884) married MP John Bonham-Carter (1788–1838) and founded the Bonham Carter family
- Samuel (1794–1880), married Mary Shore.
- Octavius (1796–1871), married Jane Cooke, and had eight children.
- Frederick (1798–1882), married Mary Yates.
- Julia (1799–1881).

The Smiths lived near the family business, and moved into Eagle House on Clapham Common.

Parliament of Great Britain
Preceded by Sir Patrick Blake; Sir James Marriott	Member of Parliament for Sudbury; 1784–1790; With: John Langston	Succeeded by John Coxe Hippisley; Thomas Champion Crespigny
Preceded by Sir Samuel Hannay, Bt; James Macpherson	Member of Parliament for Camelford; 1791–1796; With: James Macpherson to March 1796; Lord William Bentinck from March 1796	Succeeded by William Joseph Denison; John Angerstein
Preceded by John Coxe Hippisley; Thomas Champion Crespigny	Member of Parliament for Sudbury; 1796–1800; With: Sir James Marriott	Succeeded by Parliament of the United Kingdom
Parliament of the United Kingdom
Preceded by Parliament of Great Britain	Member of Parliament for Sudbury; 1801–1802; With: Sir James Marriott	Succeeded by Sir John Coxe Hippisley, Bt; John Pytches
Preceded by William Windham; John Frere	Member of Parliament for Norwich; 1802–1806; With: Robert Fellowes	Succeeded by Robert Fellowes; John Patteson
Preceded by Robert Fellowes; John Patteson	Member of Parliament for Norwich; 1807–1830; With: John Patteson 1806–1812; Charles Harvey 1812–1818; Richard Hanbury Gurney 1818–1826; Jonathan Peel 1826–1830	Succeeded by Robert Grant; Richard Hanbury Gurney
