= Third Party (British political faction) =

British political faction

- Leader: William Windham
- Founded: February 1793
- Dissolved: January 1794
- Preceded by: Foxites
- Merged into: Portlandites
- Headquarters: 106 Pall Mall, London
- Ideology: Conservatism; Anti-Jacobinism; Interventionism; Anti-radicalism
- Political position: Right-wing
- House of Commons (1793): 38 / 558

The Third Party (or the Alarmists) was a late 18th-century British political faction formed by politicians who had seceded from the Foxite Whig faction of Charles James Fox in the aftermath of the Execution of Louis XVI and Fox's perceived sympathies for the French Revolution. The faction, led by conservative Whig William Windham, ceased to engage in systematic opposition to the Pitt government while remaining independent of it and supporting its war policy.

== Background ==
The Foxite Whigs had sat in opposition to the ministry of William Pitt since falling from power in 1783. The faction's unity was maintained by the personal affection of many of its members to the faction's leader Charles James Fox and its figurehead the Duke of Portland, opposition to Pitt, and a vague sense of shared Whiggish principles. By the late 1780s the faction was experiencing increasing personal and ideological divisions, exacerbated by frustrations over their failure to regain office in the Regency Crisis. By this time the Foxites had largely absorbed the small, moribund faction loyal to Lord North, whose conservatism and association with the American Revolutionary War left the Foxites suspicious of them, despite having co-operated since the start of Pitt's government.

Personal and political animosities were present among the faction's leading members. Portland, the faction's nominal leader and figurehead, held traditional conservative aristocratic Whig sentiments but was unprepared to threaten the party's unity and was unable to restrain younger and more radical elements in the faction. This pragmatic stance was shared by many of the faction's moderate-to-conservative MPs. Opinion within the Foxite faction ranged from radicals through to conservative Whigs of the calibre of Burke. Fox, a political moderate at this time, was nevertheless increasingly influenced by the more liberal politics of Richard Brinsley Sheridan over the conservative Edmund Burke, who was increasingly isolated within the faction, with a small number of associates, namely William Windham and Lord Loughborough.

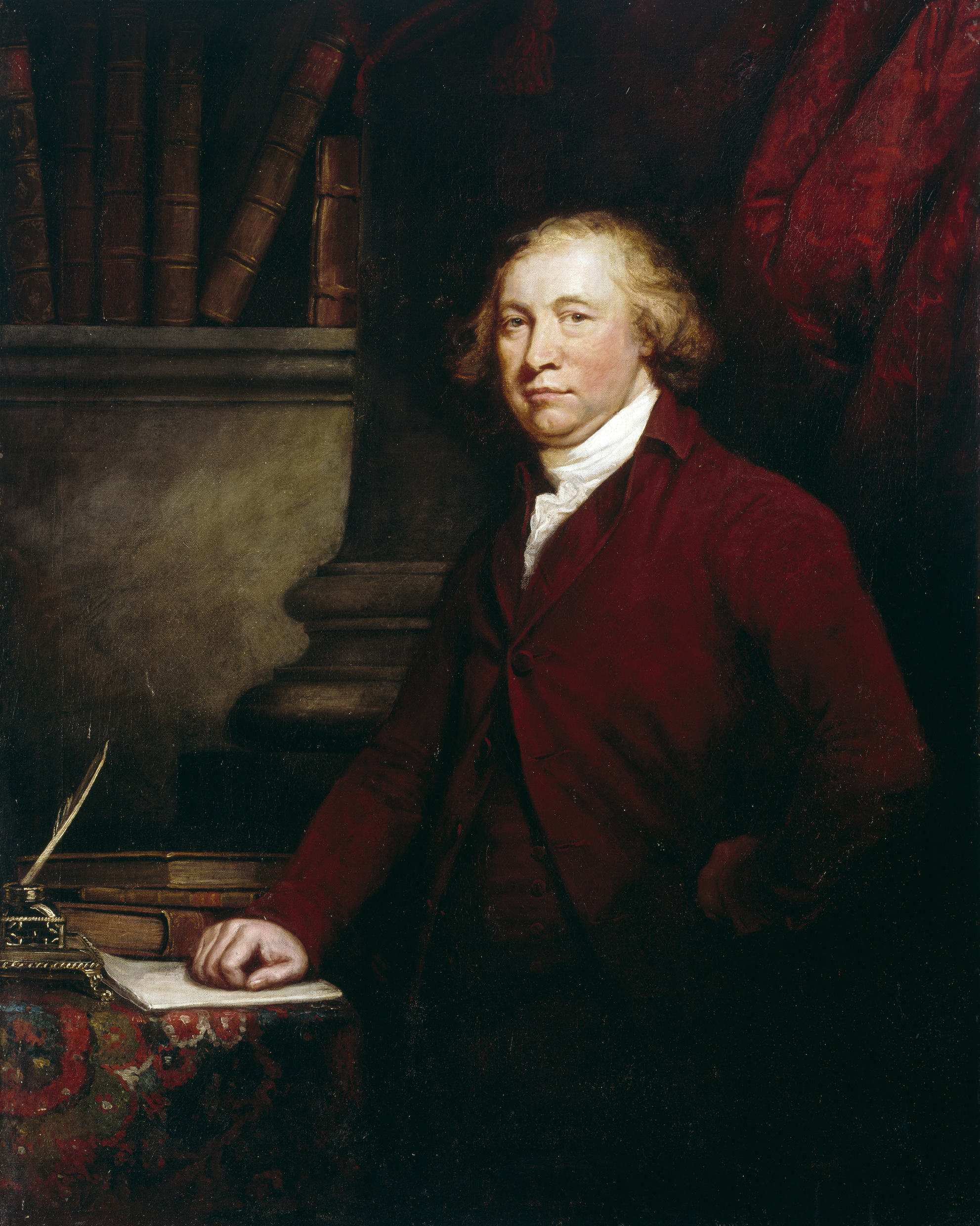
Edmund Burke, whose writings and defection from the Foxite faction helped provoke his fellow conservative Whigs.

The reaction of much of the nation to the Storming of the Bastille was, at least initially, supportive. Fox in particular would become a strong supporter and apologist for the French Revolution. Burke would quickly turn against the Revolution which eventually resulted in the publication of his Reflections on the Revolution in France in 1790. Among Burke's aims in publishing his tract was to provoke his conservative colleagues into adopting a clear stance in opposition to the Revolution. While many conservative Whig MPs and peers privately agreed with Burke, they refused to publicly split from Fox. Fox's increasing support for the Revolution would drive a wedge between Burke and himself which culminated in Burke's public severing of political and personal ties with Fox during the debate on the Quebec Bill on 6 May 1791. Burke summarily adopted an independent stance, sitting apart from the Foxite opposition and the Pittite government, while advocating a hawkish position against France.

Burke persisted in his strategy of trying to split conservative Foxites from Fox with the publication of An Appeal from the New to the Old Whigs in August 1791. This was again met without success. Despite their refusal to budge, conservative Whigs were increasingly alarmed by events in France and the reception of their more liberal colleagues at home. Conservative Foxites supported the Royal Proclamation Against Seditious Writings and Publications, issued by George III with several prominent conservative Foxites being provided advanced copies by Pitt. One conservative Whig, Loughborough was swayed to Burke's position and was later appointed Lord High Chancellor of Great Britain, a position he had long coveted. Further alarm was raised by the support of liberal Foxites such as Sheridan and Charles Grey for the reformist Society of the Friends of the People. The abolition of the French monarchy in September 1792 coupled with frustration over Portland's continued vacillation made a schism within the Foxite faction appear inevitable.

== History ==
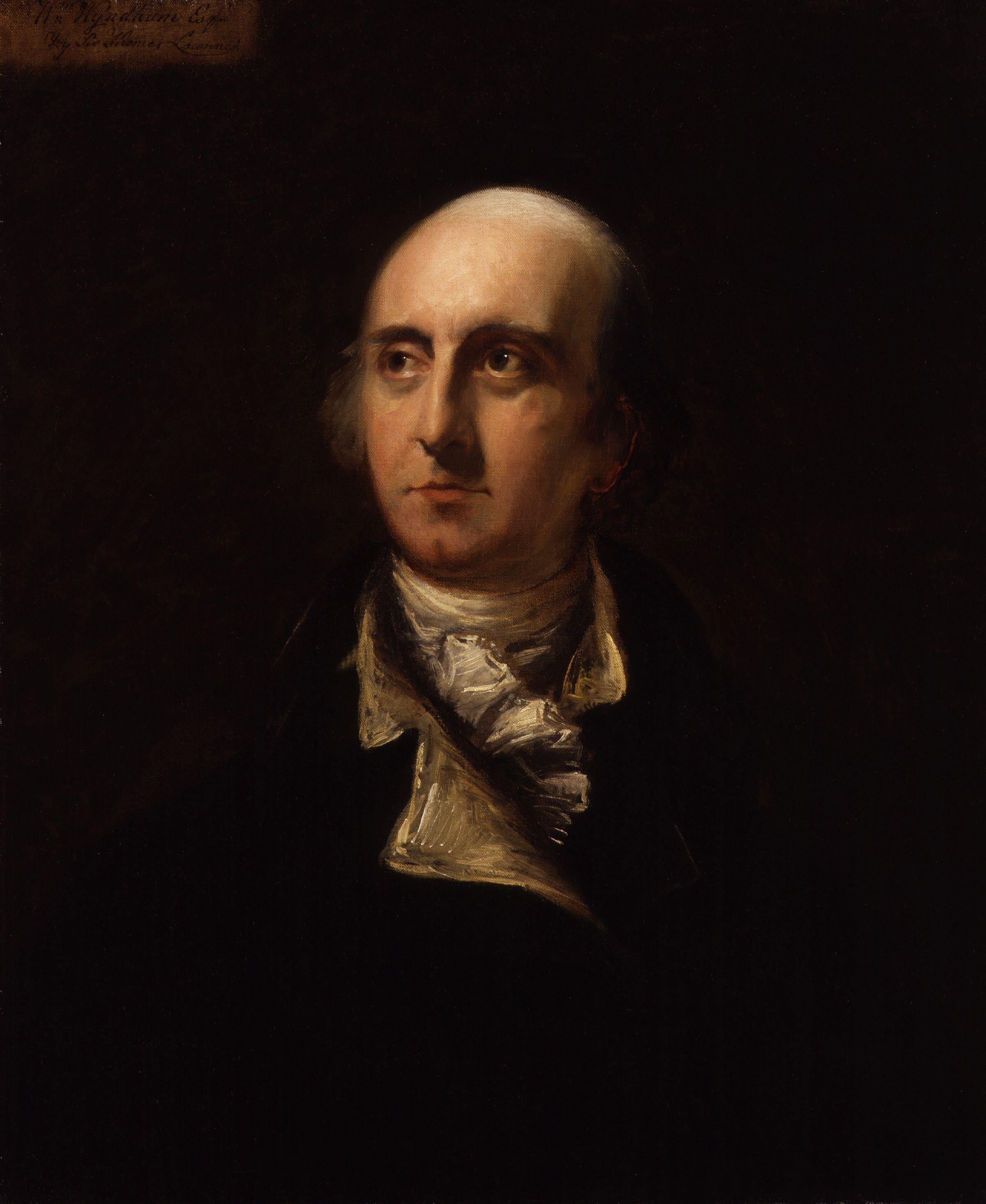
William Windham, leader of the Third Party.

The execution of Louis XVI on 21 January 1793 provoked a considerable shift in political and popular opinion in Great Britain, which became decidedly anti-Revolutionary. This event in addition to the 1 February 1793 declaration of war by the French Republic finally provoked the conservative Whigs into action. By the end of February 1793 forty-five members of the Whig Club resigned their membership, placing the blame for their secession squarely at the feet of Fox and his sympathy for French Revolutionary principles. While the conservatives had seceded from the Foxite faction, they continued to hope for Portland to secede as well, yet the nominal leader of the Whigs refused follow this action. Their particular concern over France and Jacobinism prompted the nickname of 'Alarmists'.

The conservative Whigs first met at Windham's residence at 106 Pall Mall, where out of an expected turnout of 50 Members of Parliament, a mere 21 were in attendance. Ultimately membership of the faction would number 38 MPs, of which only 26 were former Foxites, with the remaining 12 varying shades of Independent MPs. Windham proved a reluctant leader, hampered by lethargy and depression. He was finally roused to leadership with his spirited opposition to proposals for parliamentary reform by Charles Grey in May 1793. Under Windham the faction stubbornly adhered to a position of independence, dropping systematic opposition to Pitt while remaining independent of the ministry. Pitt, desiring to split apart the Foxite opposition, had taken to offering ministerial or diplomatic offices to several of the conservative Whigs. Opinions within the Third Party differed over the correct approach to these overtures from Pitt. Some, like Loughborough and Sir Gilbert Elliot, accepted government offices over the course of 1793 as individuals, while Windham insisted on continuing to maintain political independence and to bargain as collective.

The Third Party was ideologically conservative and functioned as the most right-wing grouping in the House of Commons. Its members were unified in their opposition to French republican and Jacobin politics and were all influenced by the political outlook of Burke. While supportive of the prosecution of the war, the Alarmists supported counter-revolutionary efforts in France, the restoration of the Bourbon monarchy, and were among the most sympathetic to the cause of the émigré refugees. Most prominent Alarmists were opposed to parliamentary reform and supported anti-seditious and coercive legislation proposed by the Pitt government.

The faction functioned much like a ginger group, motivated by a desire to convince Portland to join them in secession from Fox, which would in turn convince a considerable number of remaining moderate Foxites Whigs, who were personally loyal to Portland, to defect from Fox. While supporting the prosecution of the war, Portland was reluctant to engage in any action that would strengthen Pitt. Events would conspire against the continued unity of the Foxite faction.

== Dissipation ==
The execution of Marie Antoinette in October 1793, followed by the fall of the British-backed Royalists in Toulon, and a perception of Fox's increasing radicalism, would all gradually convince Portland of the futility of his position. On 20 January 1794 Portland would formally secede from the Foxite faction and formally adopted the independent line championed by the Third Party. In total 51 Portlandite Whigs would defect with Portland from the Foxite faction, leaving around 66 MPs still loyal to Fox. The Third Party, having acted as a ginger group, quickly merged with the Portlandite Whigs, who nevertheless adopted the independent line that Windham had championed for much of 1793. Ultimately this position of negotiating with the Pitt ministry as a faction rather than as individuals would culminate in the formation of the Pitt-Portland Coalition in July 1794, with various conservative Whigs, including Portland, Windham, and the Earl Fitzwilliam entering cabinet as full coalition members.

== Members of the party ==
The membership of the party, as it stood on its formation in February 1793 was recorded in several lists compiled by Windham, Lord Sheffield, and those who publicly seceded from the Whig Club in spring 1793. Most MPs appeared on at least two of these lists, though there was some disagreement between them, with at least two non-MPs included on each of the lists. Nevertheless, a hardcore of around 38 MPs were acknowledged to have formed the new faction. The members of the faction were:

Member	Prior affiliation	Constituency			
Member	Prior affiliation	Constituency	John Anstruther	Foxite	Cockermouth
Cropley Ashley	Foxite	Dorchester			
Sir Francis Basset	Foxite	Penryn			
Viscount Beauchamp	Foxite	Orford			
Charles Boone	Independent (pro-Pitt)	Castle Rising			
Wilson Braddyll	Foxite	Carlisle			
Edmund Burke	Independent	Malton			
Sir Robert Clayton	Foxite	Bletchingley			
Daniel Coke	Independent Tory	Nottingham			
Sir George Cornewall	Independent	Herefordshire			
James Dawkins	Foxite	Chippenham			
Viscount Downe	Foxite	Wootton Basset			
Sir Gilbert Elliot	Foxite	Helston			
Sir James Erskine	Foxite	Morpeth			
William Evelyn	Foxite	Morpeth			
Lord Grey	Foxite	Aldeburgh			
Winchcombe Henry Hartley	Foxite	Berkshire			
Earl of Inchiquin	Foxite	Richmond (Yorkshire)			
Whitshed Keene	Independent	Montgomery			
Richard Payne Knight	Foxite	Ludlow			
Robert Ladbroke	Foxite	Okehampton			
Sir John Fleming Leicester	Foxite	Yarmouth (Isle of Wight)			
Viscount Midleton	Foxite	Whitchurch			
Edward Miller Mundy	Independent Tory	Derbyshire			
Frederick North	Foxite	Banbury			
Earl of Upper Ossory	Independent Whig	Bedfordshire			
Charles Pierrepont	Independent	Nottinghamshire			
Thomas Powys	Independent Tory	Northamptonshire			
Charles Rainsford	Independent	Newport (Cornwall)			
Sir Matthew White Ridley	Independent	Newcastle-upon-Tyne			
Lord Sheffield	Foxite	Bristol			
Sir John Sinclair	Independent	Caithness			
Hans Sloane	Independent	Christchurch			
Thomas Stanley	Independent	Lancashire			
John Hayes St Leger	Foxite	Okehampton			
John Tempest Jr.	Independent Tory	City of Durham			
Spanish Charles Townshend	Foxite	Great Yarmouth			
William Windham	Foxite	Norwich			
