= Steward & Patteson =

Former brewery in Norwich, England

Stewart & Patteson was a brewery that was founded in Norwich, Norfolk.

== History ==
The brewery was founded in 1793 when Charles Greeves sold his brewery to John Patteson, the son of Ironmonger Henry Sparke Patteson. John's mother was Martha Fromanteel, the daughter of the Mayor of Norwich and an attorney.

When John Patteson was nine years of age, his father Henry died, and John was sent to live with his uncle John Patteson (1727–1774). He was educated at Greenwich and later Leipzig.

In 1774, John inherited his uncle's estate. He married Elizabeth Staniforth in 1781, the daughter of Robert Staniforth and descendant of the Staniforth family of Wincobank, Sheffield. John served on the Norwich Corporation, and was Mayor of the city in 1788. At Westminster he represented the Tory Party.

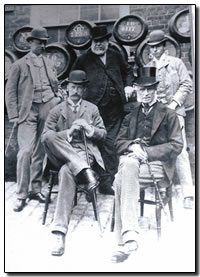
Directors of Steward & Patteson (1880s) Rear l to r: Henry Tyrwhitt Staniforth Patteson, Donald Steward, Charles Hugh Finch. Front l to r: George Henry Morse, Henry Staniforth Patteson

In 1794, John purchased the Great Yarmouth Brewery from William & James Fisher, which included 17 public houses. That same year, he purchased another brewery from James Beevor, and the following year, another from Jehosophat Postle. The public houses owned by John Day also came into his possession.

By 1819 John's ventures in the English and foreign markets began to fail and he was forced to sell his estate, by this stage he was a director of the Norwich Union Life Society along with his son John Staniforth Patteson. They ousted the management of Thomas Bignold and put in his place his three sons, Samuel, Thomas and John Cockedge, who then granted John a loan.

In 1820, the new partnership of Steward, Patteson & Stewards was formed, consisting of five partners: John Staniforth Patteson, William Steward, Ambrose Harboard Steward, Timothy Steward Sr. and Timothy Steward Jr.

John Patteson died in 1833, a year after the death of his son John Staniforth Patteson in 1832.

John Staniforth Patteson had married Ann Elizabeth Tasker in 1808, her sister Hannah married George Henry Morse the same year. George was an employee of the Norwich brewery which his father ran. In 1840 John Staniforth Patteson's son Henry Staniforth Patteson went into business with Morse and the Stewards and a new company Steward, Patteson & Stewards and George Morse was formed with an agreement to run for ten years.

In 1837 the business was merged with the brewery of Peter Finch, the company then became Steward, Patteson, Finch & Co.

By 1901, John Patteson's great-grandson Henry Tyrwhitt Staniforth Patteson was its director.

The company survived well into the 20th century and by 1961, was described as being one of the largest non-metropolitan breweries in the country.

By the early 1970s, the company had been facing financial difficulties, and by 1974, most of the breweries belonging to the company had been demolished.
