= 1802 United Kingdom general election =

- 5 July – 28 August 1802

All 658 seats in the House of Commons 330 seats needed for a majority
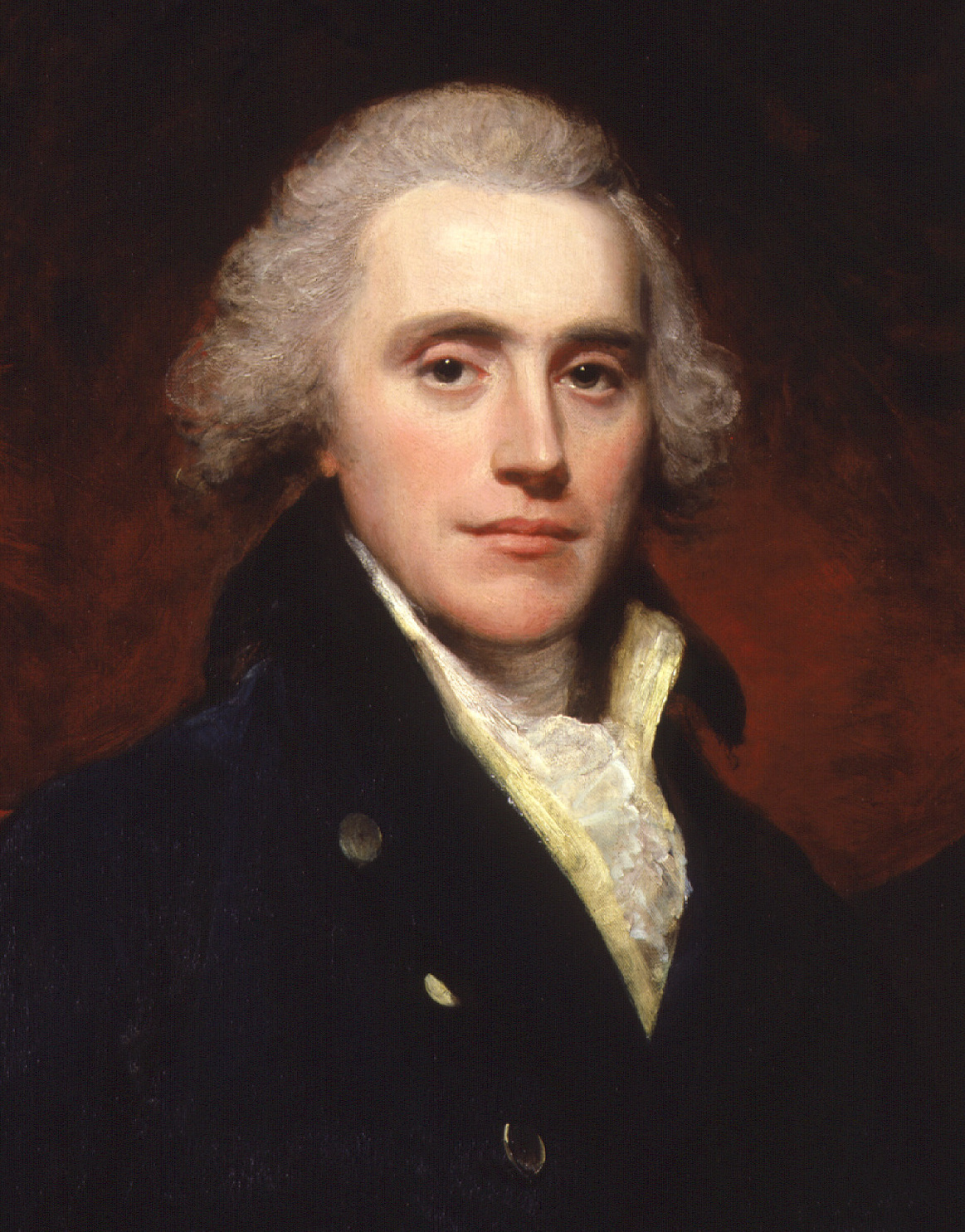

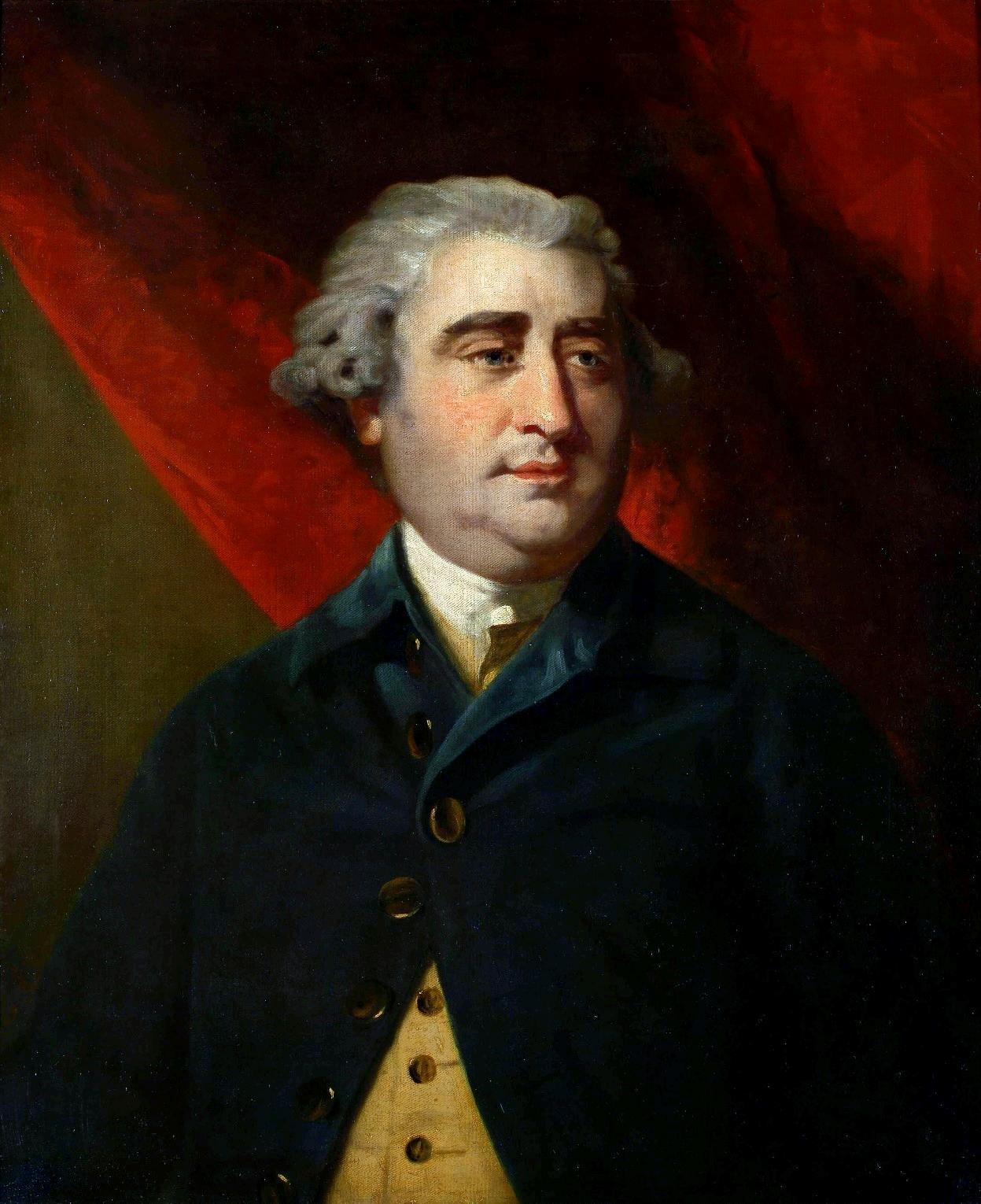

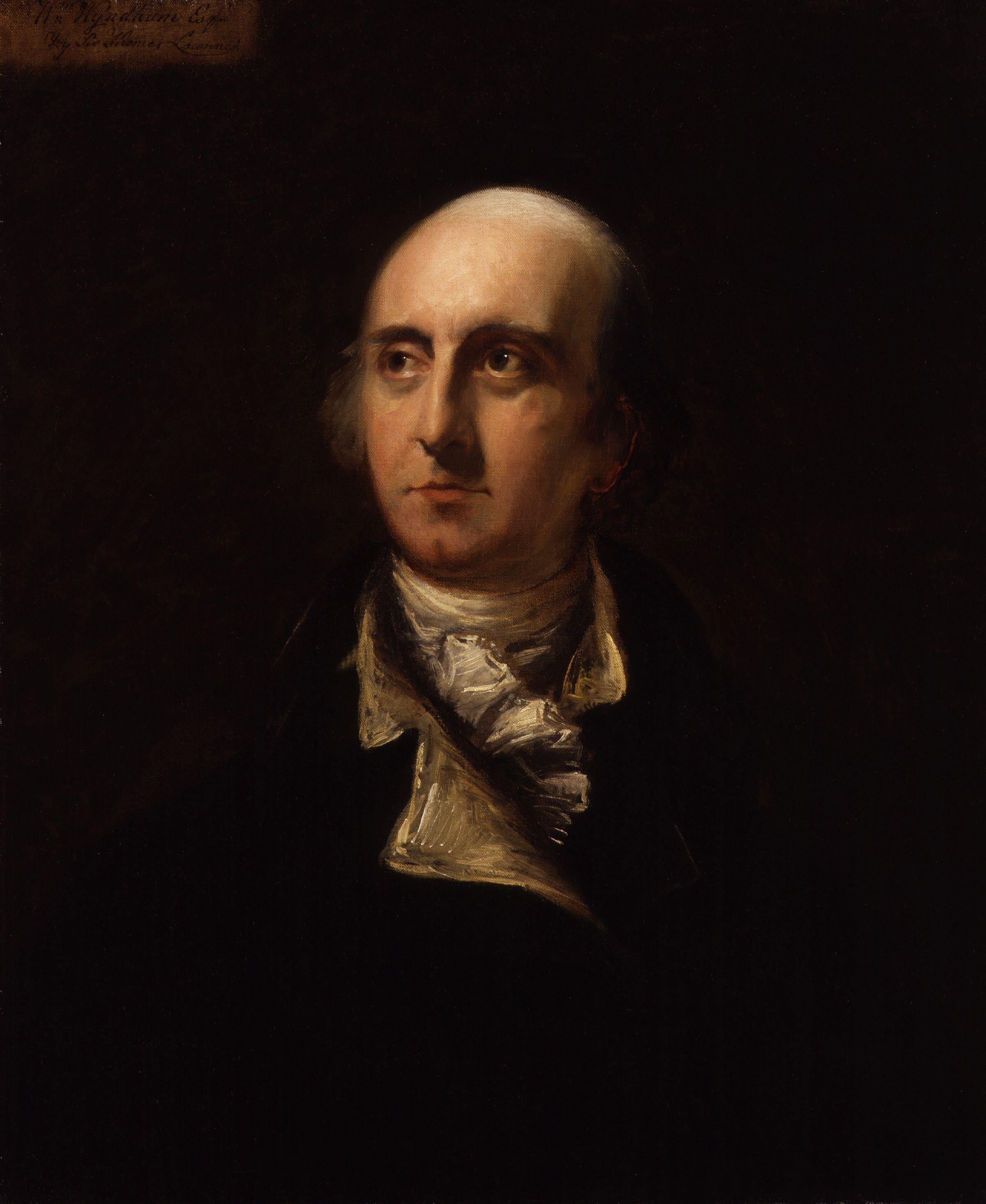
	First party	Second party	Third party
Leader	Henry Addington	Charles James Fox	William Windham
Party	Addingtonian	Foxite	Grenvillite
Leader's seat	Devizes	Westminster	St Mawes
Seats won	467	124	25
- Composition of the House of Commons following the election
Prime Minister before election
Henry Addington
Addingtonian
Prime Minister after election
Henry Addington
Addingtonian

The 1802 United Kingdom general election was the first general election after the Acts of Union 1800, held from 5 July 1802 to 28 August 1802, to elect members of the House of Commons, the lower house of the new Parliament of the United Kingdom. The first Parliament had been composed of members of the former Parliaments of the Kingdom of Great Britain and the Kingdom of Ireland.

The Parliament of Great Britain held its last general election in 1796. The final election for the Parliament of Ireland was held in 1797.

The first united Parliament was dissolved on 29 June 1802. The new Parliament was summoned to meet on 31 August 1802, for a maximum seven-year term from that date. (The maximum term could be and normally was curtailed, by the monarch dissolving the Parliament, before its term expired.)

== Political situation ==
Prime Minister Henry Addington led a war-time administration of pro-government Whigs and Tories, collectively referred to as the "Addingtonians", in office during part of the Napoleonic Wars.

The previous Prime Minister, William Pitt the Younger, had been out of office since 1801. King George III had forced Pitt to resign by refusing to agree to Catholic emancipation (allowing Catholics to sit in Parliament) following the Union. His faction in Parliament was generally supportive of the Addington ministry, before becoming increasingly opposed over the course of the Parliamentary term.

On 25 March 1802 the Treaty of Amiens brought about peace with France, with which Great Britain had been at war since 1792. The international situation remained uneasy and a renewal of war was still possible. The Treaty was supported by a strong majority of the Commons, only meeting strong opposition from the small group of 'New Opposition' or Grenvillite parliamentarians, formed around Lord Grenville and led in the Commons by William Windham, both former cabinet ministers under Pitt.

In the election the combination of the followers of Addington and Pitt comfortably defeated both the 'Old' Opposition Foxites under Charles James Fox and the 'New' Opposition of Lord Grenville. Despite his reluctance to foster a personal faction and the presence of some of his followers in both support and opposition to Addington, Pitt retained an unclear personal following of around fifty-seven MPs.

The election was a decidedly quiet affair owing to the general popularity of Addington's diplomatic and peace policies. Two notable results occurred in the urban constituencies of Middlesex and Norwich. At Middlesex the Radical Francis Burdett defeated William Mainwaring, a supporter of Addington. After an inquiry Burdett was unseated and defeated narrowly at a by-election by Mainwaring's son, George Boulton Mainwaring. At Norwich Windham and fellow conservative incumbent John Frere were defeated by Radical William Smith and Foxite Robert Fellowes in a campaign where Windham's opposition to peace had weakened his popularity. Windham was promptly returned for St Mawes, a pocket borough of Lord Grenville's brother, Lord Buckingham.

== Dates of election ==
At this period there was not one election day. After receiving a writ (a royal command) for the election to be held, the local returning officer fixed the election timetable for the particular constituency or constituencies he was concerned with. Polling in seats with contested elections could continue for many days.

The election took place over a period of almost two months. The time between the first and last contested elections was 5 July to 28 August 1802.

== Results ==
=== Seats summary ===
Parliamentary seats
Addingtonian	71.0%
Foxite	18.8%
Grenvillite	3.8%
Others	6.4%

== Summary of the constituencies ==
Monmouthshire (1 County constituency with 2 MPs and one single member Borough constituency) is included in Wales in these tables. Sources for this period may include the county in England.

Table 1: Constituencies and MPs, by type and country

Country	BC	CC	UC	Total C	BMP	CMP	UMP	Total MPs
England	202	39	2	243	404	78	4	486
Wales	13	13	0	26	13	14	0	27
Scotland	15	30	0	45	15	30	0	45
Ireland	33	32	1	66	35	64	1	100
Total	263	114	3	380	467	176	5	658

Table 2: Number of seats per constituency, by type and country

Country	BCx1	BCx2	BCx4	CCx1	CCx2	UCx1	UCx2	Total C
England	4	196	2	0	39	0	2	243
Wales	13	0	0	12	1	0	0	26
Scotland	15	0	0	30	0	0	0	45
Ireland	31	2	0	0	32	1	0	66
Total	63	198	2	42	72	1	2	380

== See also ==
- United Kingdom general elections
- Members of the 2nd UK Parliament from Ireland
- 1803 Gatton by-election
