= John Frere =

English antiquary and archaeologist

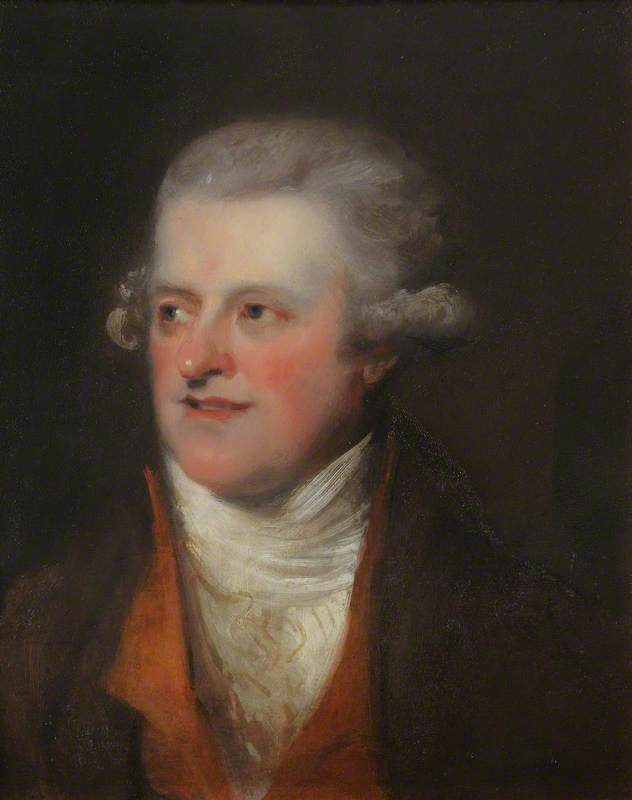
John Frere, by Henry Walton

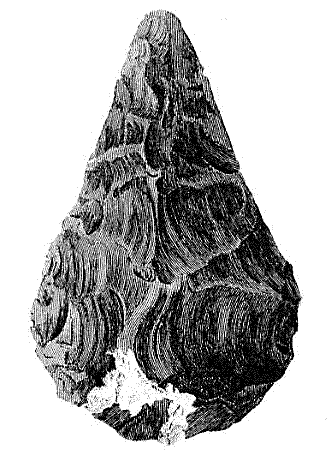
A handaxe engraving from Frere's discoveries

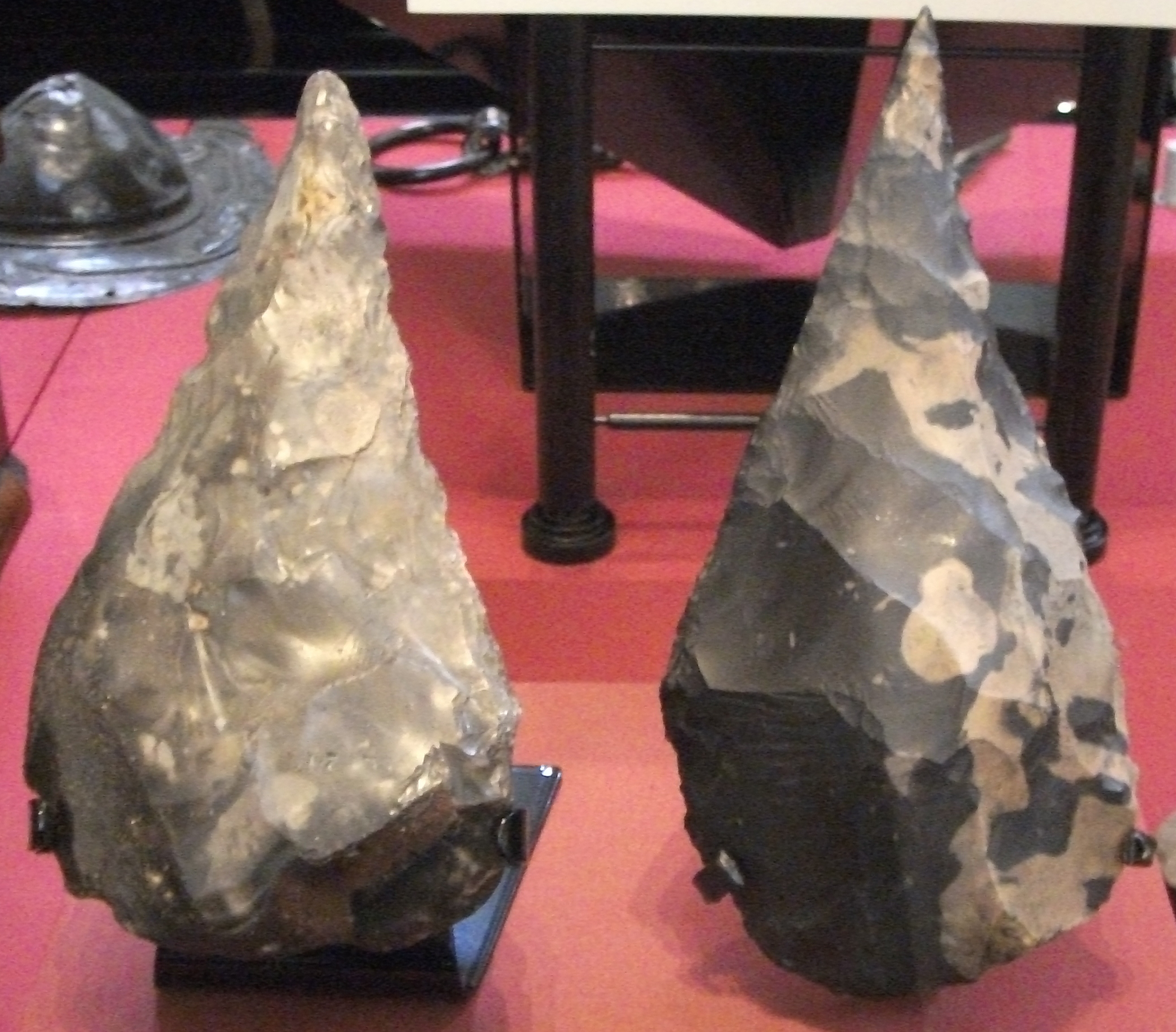
The Hoxne Handaxe (right) next to the Gray's Inn Lane Handaxe in the British Museum

John Frere FSA FRS (10 August 1740 – 12 July 1807) was an English antiquary and a pioneering discoverer of Old Stone Age or Lower Palaeolithic tools in association with large extinct animals at Hoxne, Suffolk in 1797.

== Life ==
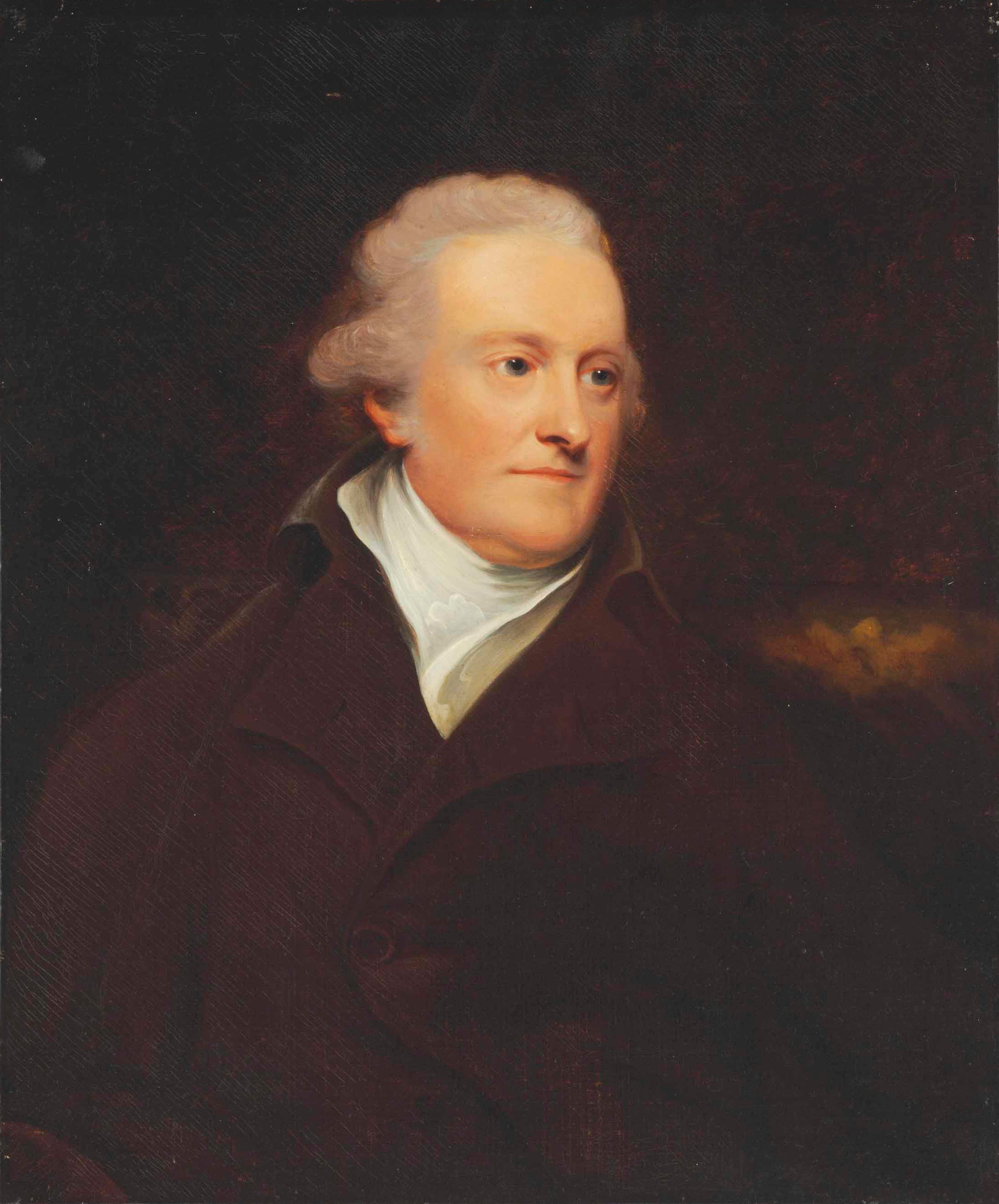
Portrait of John Frere, Esq.

Frere was born in Roydon Hall, Norfolk, the son of Sheppard Frere and Susanna Hatley. Ellenor Fenn was his sister.

In 1766, Frere received his MA from Gonville and Caius College, Cambridge, where he was Second Wrangler and was elected to a fellowship. He subsequently held several political offices and was appointed High Sheriff of Suffolk for 1776–77. He was elected a member of parliament for Norwich from 1799 to 1802.

== Antiquary ==
An interest in the past, instigated by observing worked stone tools in a clay mining pit, led him to become a Fellow of the Society of Antiquaries of London and the Royal Society and to conduct excavations at a site just south of Hoxne, 8 km east, and across the River Waveney, from his home in Roydon, near Diss. Frere wrote a letter to the Society of Antiquaries about flint tools and large bones of extinct animals found at a depth of approximately twelve feet (four meters) in a hole dug by local brickworkers. He described the worked stones as "...weapons of war, fabricated and used by a people who had not the use of metals... The situation in which these weapons were found may tempt us to refer them to a very remote period indeed, even beyond that of the present world...." In addition, Frere carefully described the stratigraphy of the find, with the tools lying below an apparent ancient sea floor, yet not in a position to which they could have been washed down. Although Frere's letter was officially read at the Society on 22 June 1797, and published by it in 1800, his interpretation was so radical by the standards of the day as to be overlooked for six decades, until noticed by John Evans.

Frere's is considered one of the most important middle Pleistocene sites in Europe, because of what he observed in his letter: juxtaposition of artefacts, animal remains and stratigraphic evidence. Its significance is double: for paleoanthropology, showing Homo presence in Britain approximately 400,000 years ago, and, for geology, dating stages of the European Great Interglacial period (known in Britain as the Hoxnian).

== Family ==
Frere married Jane Hookham, daughter of John Hookham, on 12 June 1768. They had seven sons and two daughters:

- John Hookham Frere (1769–1846), diplomat and poet
- Edward Frere (1770–1844), manager of Clydach Ironworks, father of Sir Henry Bartle Frere Bt.
- Jane Frere (1773–1829), married Sir John Orde Bt in 1793
- George Frere (1774–1854)
- William Frere (1775–1836), lawyer, Master of Downing College, Cambridge
- Bartholomew Frere (1776–1851), diplomat
- Susanna Frere (1778–1839)
- James Hatley Frere (1779–1866), writer on biblical prophecy, ancestor of Mary Leakey
- Temple Frere (1781–1859), clergyman, Speaker's Chaplain and Canon of Westminster

== Ancestry ==
Ancestors of John Frere

8. John Frere (1646-1710)
4. Edward Frere (1680-1766)
9. Anne Pretyman (d. 1725)
2. Sheppard Frere (1712-1780)
5. Ellenor Smith (d. 1763)
1. John Frere
6. John Hatley
3. Susannah Hatley (1711-1779)
14. Robert Reynolds (1658-1724)
7. Isabella Reynolds (1681-1727)
15. Keziah Tyrrell (d. 1694)

== Notes and references ==
- Robert Beatson, A Chronological Register of Both Houses of Parliament (London: Longman, Hurst, Res & Orme, 1807)
- Stephen, Leslie, ed. (1889). "Frere, John (1740-1807)" . Dictionary of National Biography. Vol. 20. London: Smith, Elder & Co.
- Leigh Rayment's Historical List of MPs

Parliament of Great Britain
| Preceded by William Windham; Hon. Henry Hobart | Member of Parliament for Norwich; 1799– 1800; With: William Windham | Succeeded by Parliament of the United Kingdom |
Parliament of the United Kingdom
| Preceded by Parliament of Great Britain | Member of Parliament for Norwich; 1801– 1802; With: William Windham | Succeeded by Robert Fellowes; William Smith |
