= Foxite =

British political faction

Foxites
- Leader(s): Charles James Fox; Viscount Howick
- Founded: 1784; 242 years ago
- Dissolved: 1806; 220 years ago
- Preceded by: Portlandites
- Merged into: Grenvillites
- Headquarters: 46 Clarges Street, London
- Ideology: Progressive liberalism Reformism; Radicalism; Anti-monarchism
- Political position: Left-wing
- National affiliation: Whigs
- Colours: Buff; Blue

Foxite was a late 18th-century British political label for Whig followers of Charles James Fox.

Fox was the generally acknowledged leader of a faction of the Whigs from 1784 to his death in 1806. The group had developed from successive earlier factions, known as the "Old Corps Whigs" (led by the Duke of Newcastle in the 1750s and early 1760s), the "Rockingham Whigs" (who had supported the Marquess of Rockingham from the mid-1760s until his death in 1782) and the "Portland Whigs", who had followed the Duke of Portland, who had succeeded Rockingham as prime minister.

In 1794, the Duke of Portland joined the ministry of William Pitt the Younger. That led to a division amongst the Portland Whigs. Those who remained in opposition became the Foxite Whigs.

By 1794, Fox had been the leading figure of the faction in the House of Commons for some years. He first served as the government Leader of the House of Commons in 1782. The term Foxite is sometimes applied to members of the House of Commons before and after the end of the titular factional leadership of Portland, and was not infrequently used as a blanket term for those opposed to the ruling Pittites after the death of Fox in 1806.

Fox and his supporters remained in opposition after 1794, until the formation of the Ministry of all the Talents in 1806. That administration was under the premiership of the leader of another Whig faction (Lord Grenville). Fox was the Leader of the House of Commons and Foreign Secretary, during that ministry.

After the death of Fox, his faction was led by Viscount Howick, who, in 1807, became Earl Grey by being removed to the House of Lords. There was a crisis of Whig leadership in the House of Commons, as no obvious chief had emerged.

The Foxite and Grenvillite factions combined their forces in the House of Commons in 1808. Grenville and Grey jointly proposed George Ponsonby as leader in the Commons. In effect, that step created the more organised Whig Party of the 19th century and was a major stage in the decline of the factional political system more characteristic of the 18th century. In effect, the Foxites had ceased to be a distinct group, having merged into the Grenvillites as part of a significantly more cohesive party of Whigs.

== Electoral performances ==
Election	Leader	Seats	+/–	Position	Government
Preceded by Portland Whigs
1784	Charles James Fox	155 / 558	▼105	2nd	Minority
1790	Charles James Fox	183 / 523	▲28	2nd	Minority
1796	Charles James Fox	95 / 519	▼88	2nd	Minority
1802	Charles James Fox	269 / 658	▲174	2nd	Minority
1806	Charles James Fox	431 / 658	▲172	▲1st	Majority
Merged into Grenvillite Whigs

- a: Presented inside the Foxite-Grenvillite's Whig coalition.

== See also ==
- Republicanism in the United Kingdom

== Bibliography ==
- Fox, Charles J.; Russell, John (1853). R. Bentley (ed.). Memorials and correspondence of Charles James Fox. Vol. 2. ISBN 978-1143282843.
- Foord, Archibald S. (1964). Oxford University Press (ed.). His Majesty's Opposition, 1714-1830. Clarendon Press. ISBN 978-0198213116.
- Mitchell, Leslie G. (1992). Oxford University Press (ed.). Charles James Fox. Oxford University Press. ISBN 978-0198201045.
- Mitchell, Leslie G. (1993). Oxford University Press (ed.). "Foxite Politics and the Great Reform Bill". English Historical Review. 108 (427): 338–364. doi:10.1093/ehr/CVIII.427.338. JSTOR 573710.
- Hay, William A. (2005). Palgrave Macmillan (ed.). The Whig Revival, 1808-1830. Springer. ISBN 978-1403917713.
- Dinwiddy, J. R. (1992). A&C Black (ed.). Radicalism and Reform in Britain, 1780-1850. A&C Black. ISBN 978-1852850623.
- Beasley, Edward (2016). Routledge (ed.). The Chartist General: Charles James Napier, The Conquest of Sind, and Imperial Liberalism. Routledge. ISBN 978-1138699267.
- Claeys, Gregory (2007). Palgrave (ed.). French Revolution Debate in Britain: The Origins of Modern Politics. Macmillan Education UK. ISBN 978-0333626474.
- Prochaska, Frank (2000). Allen Lane (ed.). The republic of Britain, 1760-2000. Allen Lane. ISBN 978-0140292435.
- Leach, Robert (2002). Macmillan (ed.). Political Ideology in Britain. Palgrave Macmillan. ISBN 978-1137332547.
