= 1806 United Kingdom general election =

← 1802	29 October – 17 December 1806	1807 →

All 658 seats in the House of Commons 330 seats needed for a majority
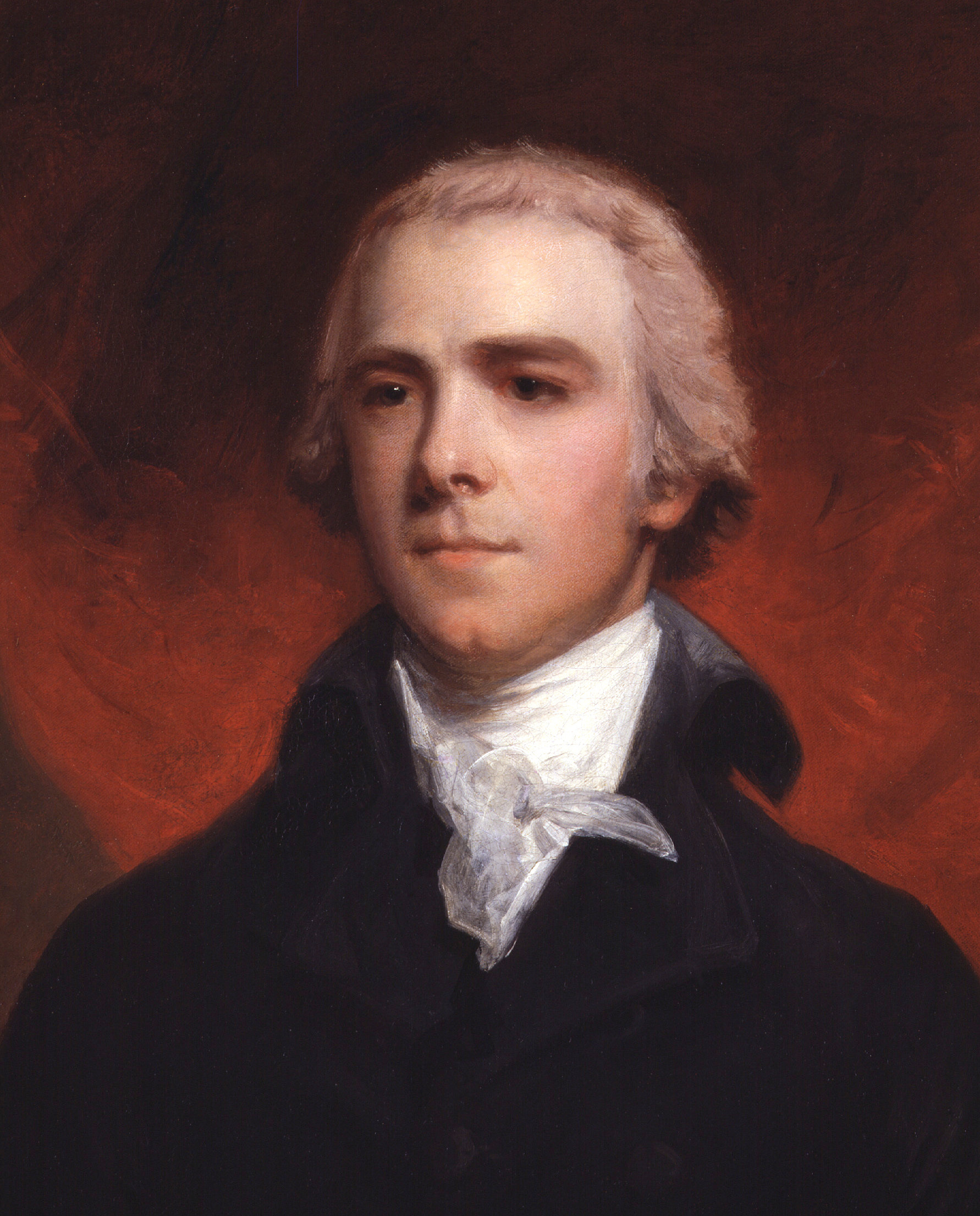

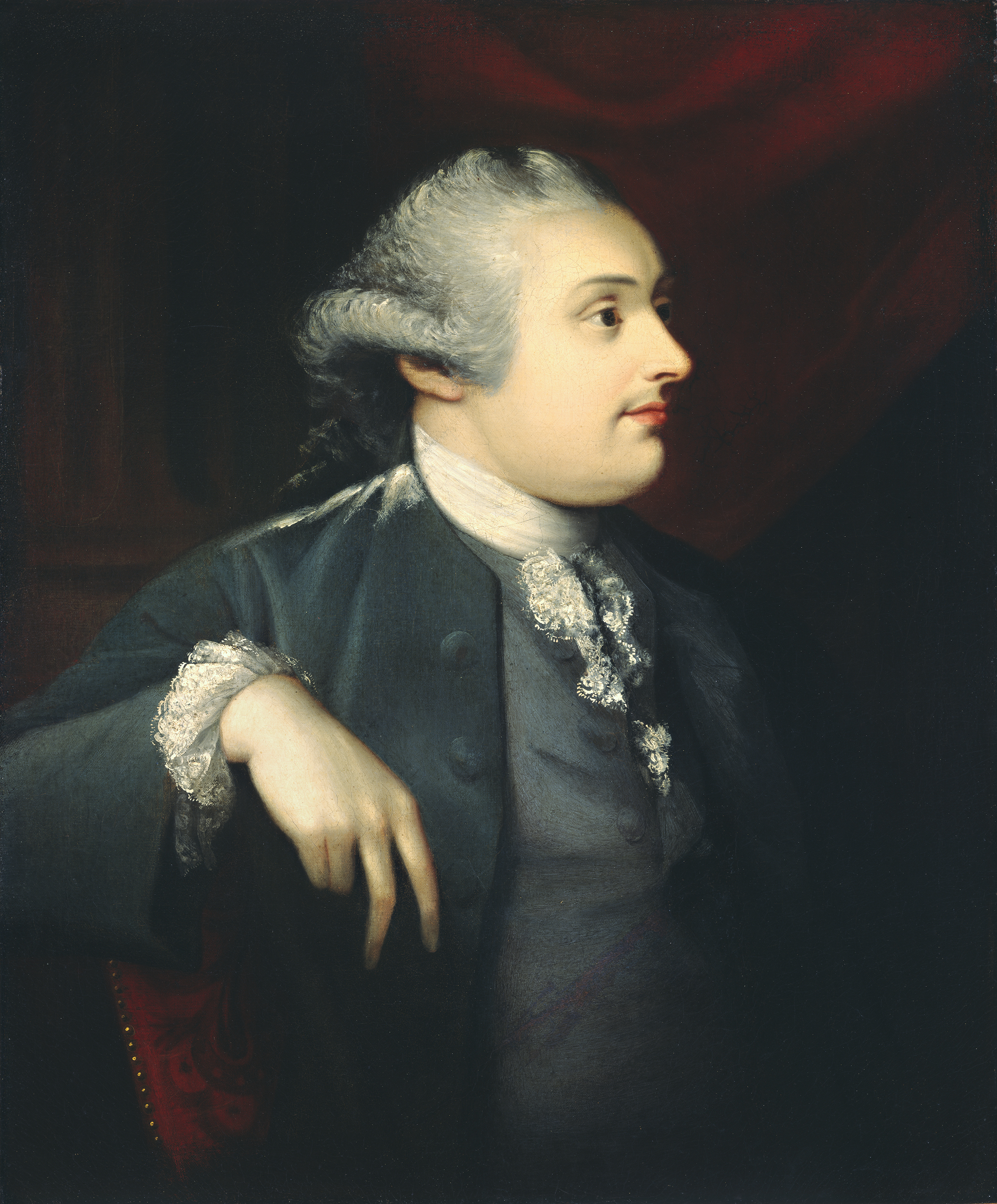
	First party	Second party
Leader	Lord Grenville	Duke of Portland
Party	Whig	Tory
Leader since	11 February 1806	—
Seats won	431	228
Seat change	▲307	▼239
- Composition of the House of Commons after the election
Prime Minister before election
Lord Grenville
Whig
Prime Minister after
election
Lord Grenville
Whig

The 1806 United Kingdom general election was the second general election after the Acts of Union 1800, held from 29 October 1806 to 17 December 1806, to elect members of the House of Commons, the lower house of Parliament.

The general election took place in a situation of considerable uncertainty about the future of British politics, following the sudden death of William Pitt the Younger and the formation of the Ministry of all the Talents.

Parliament was dissolved on 24 October 1806. The new Parliament was summoned to meet on 13 December 1806, for a maximum seven-year term from that date. The maximum term could be and normally was curtailed, by the monarch dissolving the Parliament, before its term expired.

== Political situation ==
Since the previous general election fighting in the Napoleonic Wars with France had resumed in 1803. Tory Prime Minister Henry Addington had resigned in 1804. William Pitt the Younger formed a new coalition of pro-government Whig and Tory politicians to prosecute the war.

The opposition Whigs, led by Charles James Fox, continued to oppose the government. They were strengthened by a group of Pitt's former supporters (such as his cousin William Grenville, 1st Baron Grenville) who had aligned themselves with Fox in opposition to Addington after 1802 and who did not accompany Pitt and his other friends back to office in 1804.

When Pitt died on 23 January 1806 a new ministry was formed by Grenville. It included Fox and Addington (now ennobled as the 1st Viscount Sidmouth) as well as other leading political figures of the day. However it did not include George Canning, who had inherited the leadership of Pitt's faction in the House of Commons or the Duke of Portland who led it in the House of Lords. This government was known as the Ministry of all the Talents.

An attempt was made to end the Napoleonic Wars by negotiation. As this hope failed the war continued. Grenville also tried to strengthen the government, but was unable to persuade the Pittites to join him either as a body or by detaching some leading figures. The Prime Minister was not prepared to exclude Fox and his friends as the Pittites wanted.

Lord Grenville then decided to hold a general election to strengthen his government. The King granted a dissolution.

The Talents were in office at the time of this election and continued after it, but the Ministry was weakened by the death of Fox on 13 September 1806. The election itself was a disappointment. In the eighteenth century a government with the King's backing could expect to make substantial gains at an election. However Pitt's financial reforms had weakened the ability of the Treasury to manipulate election results. Foord estimated that the Ministry only gained about thirty seats by the 1806 appeal to the country.

== Dates of election ==
At this period there was not one election day. After receiving a writ (a royal command) for the election to be held, the local returning officer fixed the election timetable for the particular constituency or constituencies he was concerned with. Polling in seats with contested elections could continue for many days.

The time between the first and last contested elections was 29 October to 17 December 1806.

== Results ==

=== Seats summary ===
Parliamentary seats
Whig	65.5%
Tory	34.5%

== Summary of the constituencies ==
Monmouthshire (1 County constituency with 2 MPs and one single member Borough constituency) is included in Wales in these tables. Sources for this period may include the county in England.

Table 1: Constituencies and MPs, by type and country

Country	BC	CC	UC	Total C	BMP	CMP	UMP	Total MPs
England	202	39	2	243	404	78	4	486
Wales	13	13	0	26	13	14	0	27
Scotland	15	30	0	45	15	30	0	45
Ireland	33	32	1	66	35	64	1	100
Total	263	114	3	380	467	176	5	658

Table 2: Number of seats per constituency, by type and country

Country	BCx1	BCx2	BCx4	CCx1	CCx2	UCx1	UCx2	Total C
England	4	196	2	0	39	0	2	243
Wales	13	0	0	12	1	0	0	26
Scotland	15	0	0	30	0	0	0	45
Ireland	31	2	0	0	32	1	0	66
Total	63	198	2	42	72	1	2	380

== See also ==
- United Kingdom general elections
- Members of the 3rd UK Parliament from Ireland
