= 1807 United Kingdom general election =

- 4 May – 9 June 1807

All 658 seats in the House of Commons 330 seats needed for a majority
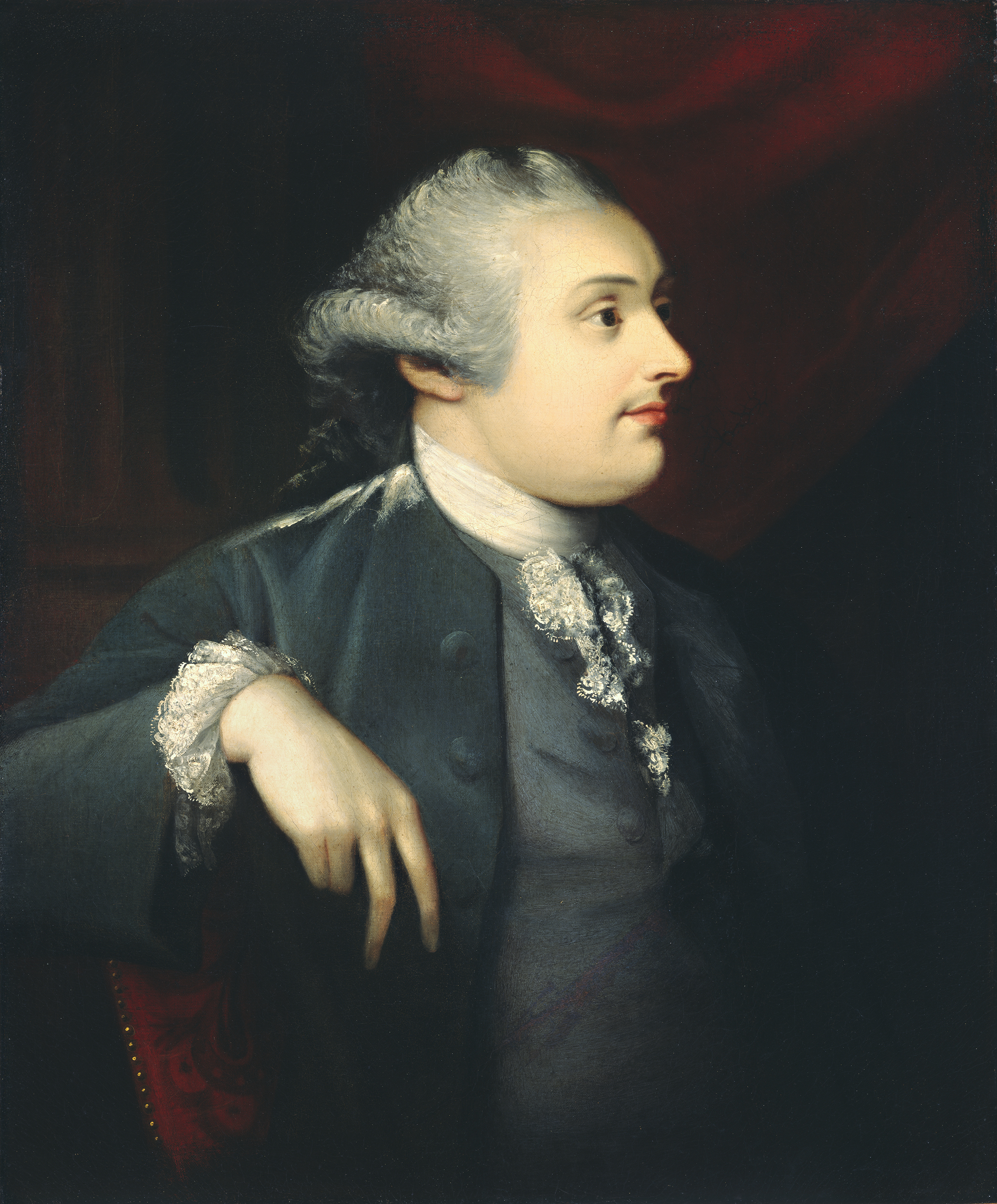

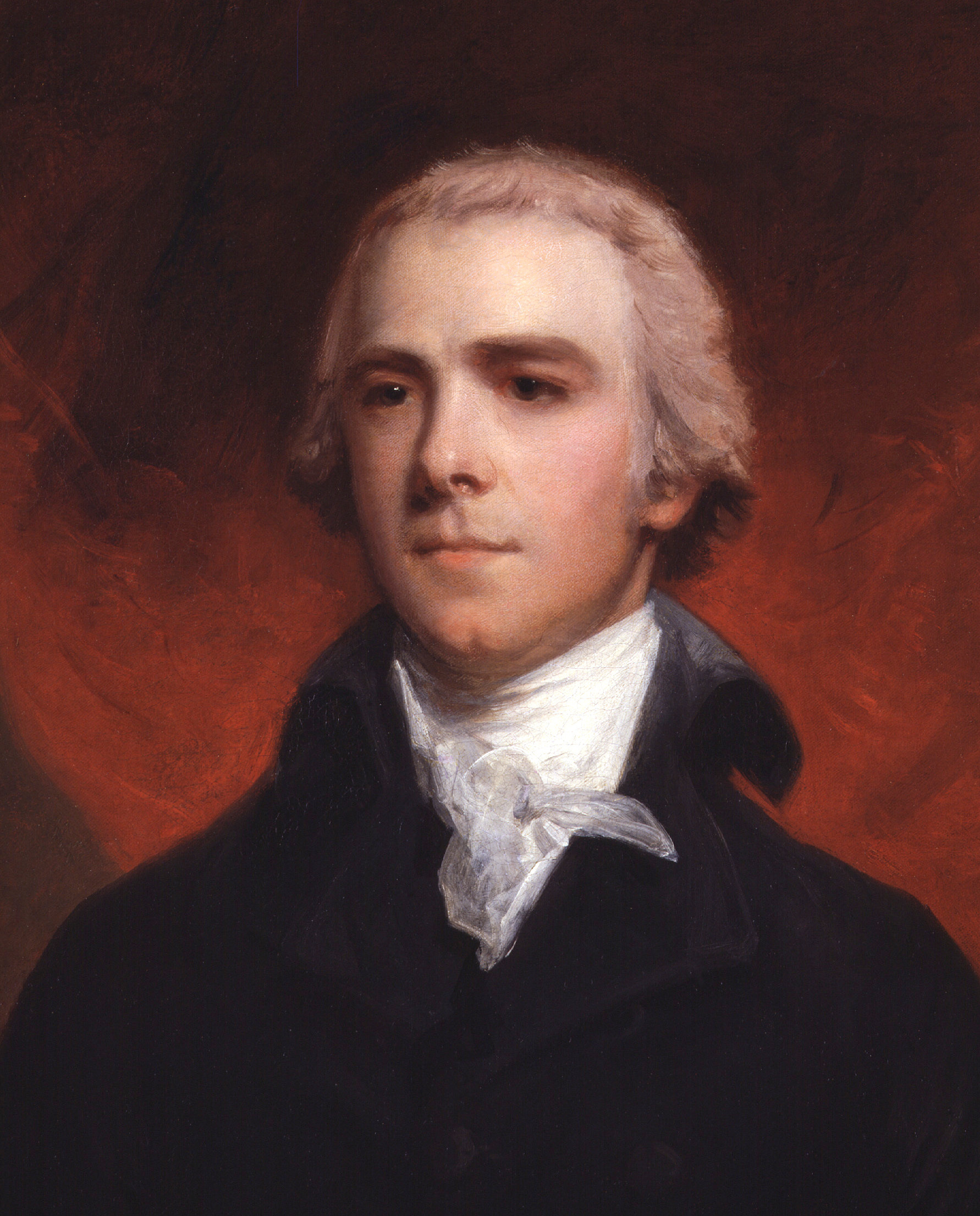
	First party	Second party
Leader	Duke of Portland	Lord Grenville
Party	Tory	Whig
Leader since	31 March 1807	11 February 1806
Seats won	216	213
Seat change	▼12	▼218
- Composition of the House of Commons after the election
Prime Minister before election
Duke of Portland
Tory
Prime Minister after
election
Duke of Portland
Tory

The 1807 United Kingdom general election was the third general election after the Acts of Union 1800, held from 4 May 1807 to 9 June 1807.

The third United Kingdom Parliament was dissolved on 29 April 1807. The new Parliament was summoned to meet on 22 June 1807, for a maximum seven-year term from that date. The maximum term could be and normally was curtailed, by the monarch dissolving the Parliament, before its term expired.

== Political situation ==
Following the 1806 election the Ministry of all the Talents, a coalition of the Foxite and Grenvillite Whig and Addingtonite Tory factions, with William Grenville, 1st Baron Grenville, as Prime Minister continued in office. It had attempted to end the Napoleonic Wars by negotiation. As this hope failed the war continued.

The faction formerly led by William Pitt the Younger, before his death in January 1806, were the major group in opposition to the Talents' Ministry. George Canning in the House of Commons and the Duke of Portland in the House of Lords were at the head of this opposition.

Grenville and his cabinet lost the support of King George III by trying to legislate to permit Roman Catholics to serve as Army and Navy officers. When ministers refused to give the King written confirmation that they would not raise the Catholic issue again, he decided to find new servants.

The elderly Duke of Portland was asked to form a new ministry in March 1807. Portland had been the Whig Prime Minister before, in the 1780s, so now he described himself as the Whig Prime Minister of a Tory ministry.

After Pitt's death the younger Pittites increasingly began calling themselves the Tory Party, whether they had previously belonged to the Whig or Tory tradition. This was an important stage in the development of a more organised two-party system, which reduced the influence of factions and connections in British politics.

The new ministers found it difficult to manage a House of Commons recently elected to support their opponents. A month into the new government the King granted a dissolution.

The government policies of opposing Catholic relief and supporting the traditional powers of the King proved popular (at least with the restricted section of the population enfranchised in elections for the unreformed House of Commons). After the election the government programme was approved by a vote of 350 to 155 in the House of Commons, demonstrating the substantial gains ministers had made in the election.

== Dates of election ==
At this period there was not one election day. After receiving a writ (a royal command) for the election to be held, the local returning officer fixed the election timetable for the particular constituency or constituencies he was concerned with. Polling in seats with contested elections could continue for many days.

The time between the first and last contested elections was 4 May to 9 June 1807.

== Results ==
=== Seats summary ===
Parliamentary seats
Tory	32.8%
Whig	32.2%
Radical	0.2%
Others	34.7%

== Summary of the constituencies ==
Monmouthshire (1 County constituency with 2 MPs and one single member Borough constituency) is included in Wales in these tables. Sources for this period may include the county in England.

Table 1: Constituencies and MPs, by type and country

Country	BC	CC	UC	Total C	BMP	CMP	UMP	Total MPs
England	202	39	2	243	404	78	4	486
Wales	13	13	0	26	13	14	0	27
Scotland	15	30	0	45	15	30	0	45
Ireland	33	32	1	66	35	64	1	100
Total	263	114	3	380	467	176	5	658

Table 2: Number of seats per constituency, by type and country

Country	BCx1	BCx2	BCx4	CCx1	CCx2	UCx1	UCx2	Total C
England	4	196	2	0	39	0	2	243
Wales	13	0	0	12	1	0	0	26
Scotland	15	0	0	30	0	0	0	45
Ireland	31	2	0	0	32	1	0	66
Total	63	198	2	42	72	1	2	380

== See also ==
- United Kingdom general elections
