= Ministry of All the Talents =

National unity government of the United Kingdom from February 1806 to March 1807

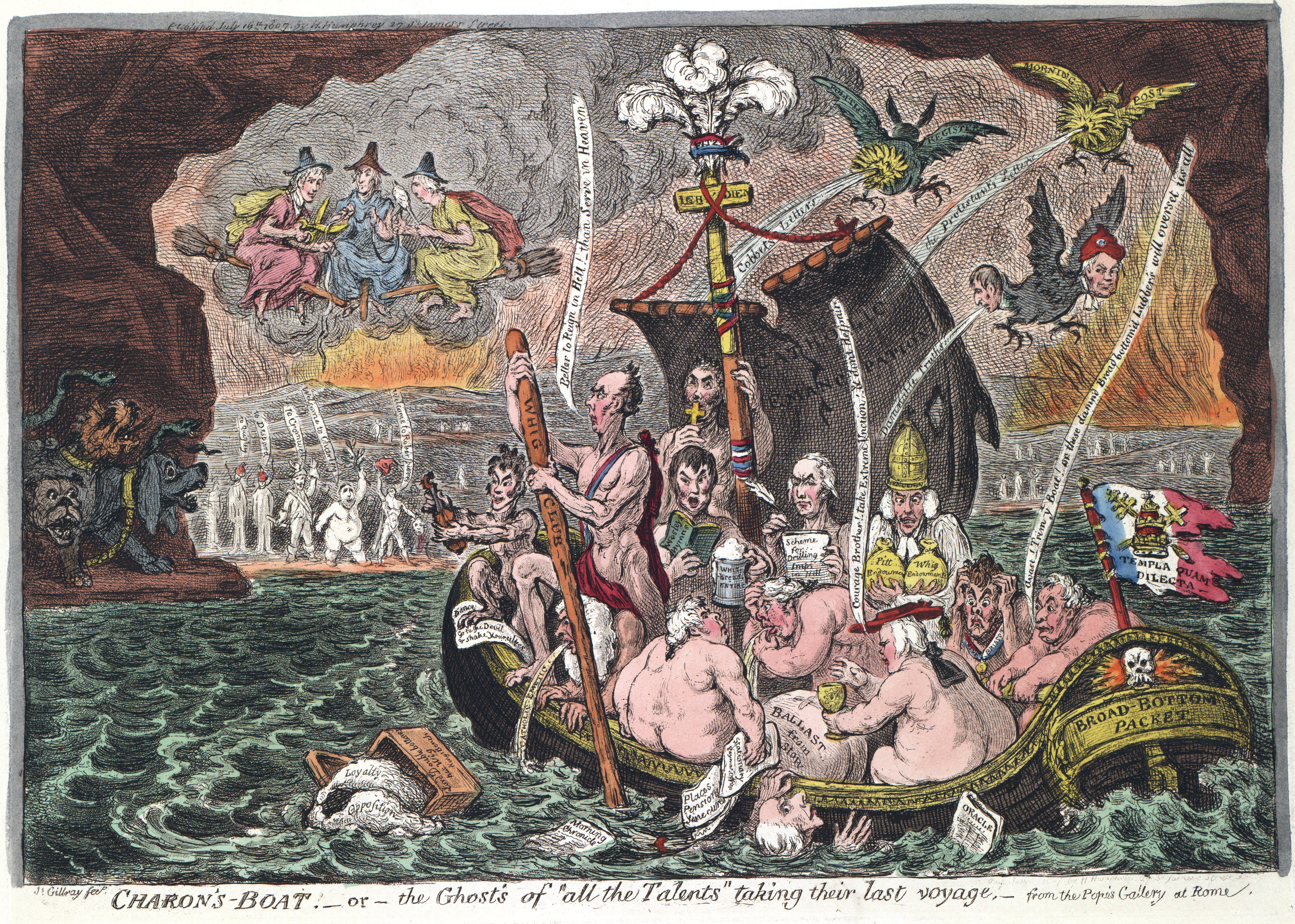
A caricature of the ministry's break-up: James Gillray's Charon's Boat.—or—the Ghosts of "all the Talents" taking their last voyage (1807). Charles Grey, Lord Howick, rows and John Jervis, 1st Earl of St Vincent, steers.

The Ministry of All the Talents was a national unity government in the United Kingdom of Great Britain and Ireland formed by William Grenville, 1st Baron Grenville, on his appointment as prime minister on 11 February 1806, following the death of William Pitt the Younger.

== History ==
With the country remaining at war, Grenville aimed to form the strongest possible government and so included most leading politicians from almost all groupings, although some followers of the younger Pitt, led by George Canning, refused to join.

The inclusion of Charles James Fox surprised some as King George III had previously been very hostile to Fox, but the King's willingness to put aside past enmities for the sake of national unity encouraged many others to join or support the government as well. The ministry boasted a fairly progressive agenda, much of it inherited from Pitt.

The Ministry of All the Talents had comparatively little success, failing to bring the sought-after peace with France. In fact, the war continued for nearly another decade. It did, however, abolish the slave trade in Britain in 1807 before breaking up in 1807 over the question of Catholic emancipation.

It was succeeded by the Second Portland ministry, headed by William Cavendish-Bentinck, 3rd Duke of Portland.

== List of ministers ==
Members of the Cabinet are in bold face.

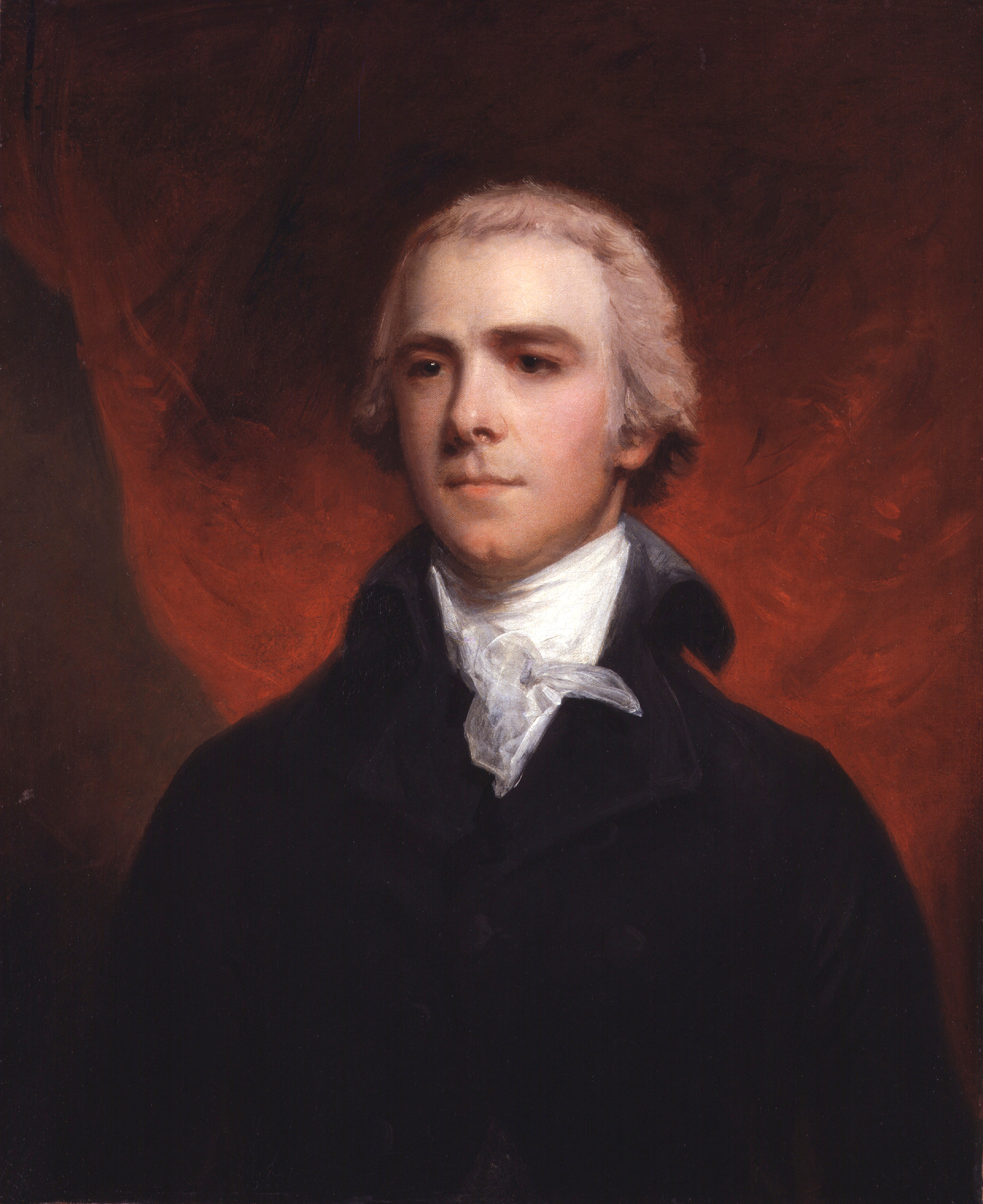
Portrait of Lord Grenville by John Hoppner. Grenville, a former ally of Pitt the Younger, led the government during its thirteen months in office.

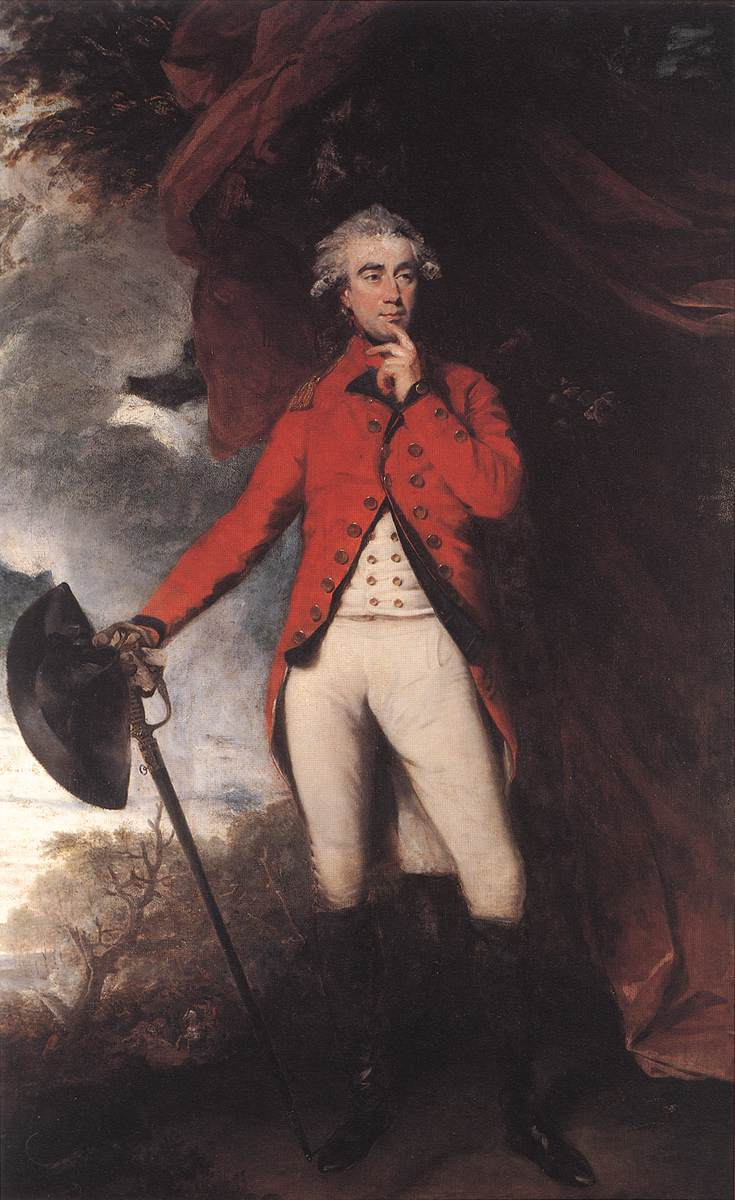
Portrait of Lord Moira by Joshua Reynolds. Moira represented the supporters of the Prince of Wales in the cabinet.

Office	Name	Date
First Lord of the Treasury Leader of the House of Lords	**William Grenville, 1st Baron Grenville**	11 February 1806 – 31 March 1807
Chancellor of the Exchequer	**Lord Henry Petty**	11 February 1806 – 31 March 1807
Joint Secretaries to the Treasury	Nicholas Vansittart	February 1806 – March 1807
Joint Secretaries to the Treasury	John King	February – July 1806
Joint Secretaries to the Treasury	William Henry Fremantle	July 1806 – March 1807
Junior Lords of the Treasury	John Spencer, Viscount Althorp, William Wickham and John Courtenay	11 February 1806
Lord Chancellor	**Thomas Erskine, 1st Baron Erskine**	February 1806
Lord President of the Council	**William Fitzwilliam, 4th Earl Fitzwilliam**	19 February 1806
Lord President of the Council	**Henry Addington, 1st Viscount Sidmouth**	8 October 1806
Lord Privy Seal	**Henry Addington, 1st Viscount Sidmouth**	February 1806
Lord Privy Seal	**Henry Vassall-Fox, 3rd Baron Holland**	8 October 1806
Secretary of State for the Home Department	**George Spencer, 2nd Earl Spencer**	5 February 1806
Under-Secretary of State for the Home Department	Charles Williams-Wynn	February 1806
Secretary of State for Foreign Affairs Leader of the House of Commons	**Charles James Fox**	7 February 1806 – 13 September 1806
Secretary of State for Foreign Affairs Leader of the House of Commons	**Charles Grey, Viscount Howick**	24 September 1806
Parliamentary Under-Secretary of State for Foreign Affairs	George Walpole and Sir Francis Vincent, 3rd Baronet	February 1806 – March 1807
Secretary of State for War and the Colonies	**William Windham**	February 1806
Under-Secretary of State for War and the Colonies	Sir George Shee, 1st Baronet and Sir James Cockburn, 9th Baronet	February 1806 – March 1807
First Lord of the Admiralty	**Charles Grey** (Note: Styled Viscount Howick from 11 April 1806.)	10 February 1806
First Lord of the Admiralty	**Thomas Grenville**	29 September 1806
First Secretary to the Admiralty	William Marsden	Continued in office
Civil Lords of the Admiralty	Sir Philip Stephens, 1st Baronet	10 February – 23 October 1806
Civil Lords of the Admiralty	Lord William Russell and William Edwardes, 2nd Baron Kensington	10 February 1806 – 31 March 1807
Civil Lords of the Admiralty	William Frankland	23 October 1806 – 31 March 1807
President of the Board of Trade	William Eden, 1st Baron Auckland	5 February 1806
Vice-President of the Board of Trade (Note: Earl Temple concurrently served as Paymaster of the Forces and Vice-President of the Board of Trade.)	Richard Temple-Nugent-Brydges-Chandos-Grenville, 3rd Earl Temple	5 February 1806
President of the Board of Control	Gilbert Elliot-Murray-Kynynmound, 1st Baron Minto	12 February 1806
President of the Board of Control	**Thomas Grenville**	16 July 1806
President of the Board of Control	**George Tierney**	1 October 1806
Secretary to the Board of Control	Thomas Creevey	14 February 1806
Chancellor of the Duchy of Lancaster	Edward Smith-Stanley, 12th Earl of Derby	12 February 1806
Master-General of the Ordnance	**Francis Rawdon-Hastings, 2nd Earl of Moira**	February 1806
Lieutenant-General of the Ordnance	Sir Thomas Trigge	Continued in office
Treasurer of the Ordnance	Alexander Davison	20 February 1806
Surveyor-General of the Ordnance	James Murray Hadden	Continued in office
Clerk of the Ordnance	John Calcraft	22 February 1806
Clerk of the Deliveries of the Ordnance	James Lloyd	12 March 1806
Storekeeper of the Ordnance	John McMahon	22 February 1806
Treasurer of the Navy	Richard Brinsley Sheridan	February 1806
Secretary at War	Richard FitzPatrick	February 1806
Master of the Mint	Lord Charles Spencer	February 1806
Master of the Mint	Charles Bathurst	October 1806
Paymaster of the Forces	Richard Temple-Nugent-Brydges-Chandos-Grenville, 3rd Earl Temple and Lord John Townshend	February 1806 – March 1807
Postmaster General	John Proby, 1st Earl of Carysfort and Robert Hobart, 4th Earl of Buckinghamshire	February 1806 – March 1807
Minister without Portfolio	**William Fitzwilliam, 4th Earl Fitzwilliam**	October 1806 – March 1807
Lord Lieutenant of Ireland	John Russell, 6th Duke of Bedford	12 March 1806
Lord Lieutenant of Ireland	Charles Lennox, 4th Duke of Richmond	11 April 1807
Chief Secretary for Ireland	William Elliot	February 1806
Lord Chief Justice of the King's Bench	**Edward Law, 1st Baron Ellenborough**	Continued in office
Attorney General	Sir Arthur Piggott	12 February 1806
Solicitor General	Sir Samuel Romilly	12 February 1806
Judge Advocate General	Nathaniel Bond	8 March 1806
Lord Advocate	Henry Erskine	February 1806
Solicitor General for Scotland	John Clerk	February 1806
Attorney General for Ireland	William Plunket	Continued in office
Solicitor General for Ireland	Charles Kendal Bushe	Continued in office
Lord Steward of the Household	Heneage Finch, 4th Earl of Aylesford	Continued in office
Treasurer of the Household	Charles Bennet, Baron Ossulston	12 February 1806
Comptroller of the Household	Lord George Thynne	Continued in office
Lord Chamberlain of the Household	George Legge, 3rd Earl of Dartmouth	Continued in office
Vice-Chamberlain of the Household	Lord John Thynne	Continued in office
Master of the Horse	Henry Herbert, 1st Earl of Carnarvon	8 February 1806
Master of the Buckhounds	William Keppel, 4th Earl of Albemarle	12 February 1806
Captain of the Gentlemen Pensioners	St Andrew St John, 14th Baron St John of Bletso	12 February 1806
Captain of the Yeomen of the Guard	George Parker, 4th Earl of Macclesfield	Continued in office

== Other uses of the term ==
The term has since been used in politics to describe an administration with members from more than one party or even a non-coalition government that enjoys cross-party support due to gifted and/or non-partisan members. Examples include the coalition government which led the United Kingdom through the Second World War and the Canadian government that won the 1896 election. In Ireland, the Government of the 20th Dáil (a Fine Gael–Labour coalition that was in office between 1973 and 1977) was widely called the "cabinet of all the talents."

== See also ==
- National unity government
- National Government (United Kingdom)

Preceded by Second Pitt ministry	Government of the United Kingdom; 1806–1807	Succeeded by Second Portland ministry
