= Gowran (disambiguation) =

Gowran is a town in Ireland. It may also refer to:

- Gowran (barony), County Kilkenny, Ireland
- Gowran (Parliament of Ireland constituency), a constituency until 1800
- John Butler, 1st Earl of Gowran (1643–1677), a Member of the Irish Parliament; only titleholder, dying childless
- Baron Gowran, a title in the Peerage of Ireland:
  - Richard FitzPatrick, 1st Baron Gowran (c. 1662–1727)
- John FitzPatrick, 1st Earl of Upper Ossory (1719–1758), also 2nd Baron Gowran

== See also ==
- Jack MacGowran (1918–1973), Irish actor
- Gawron, a surname
- Gawron-class corvette, a Polish Navy class
- PZL-101 Gawron, an airplane
- Gowron, a Star Trek character
