= Mary Fox, Baroness Holland =

British noblewoman (1747–1778)

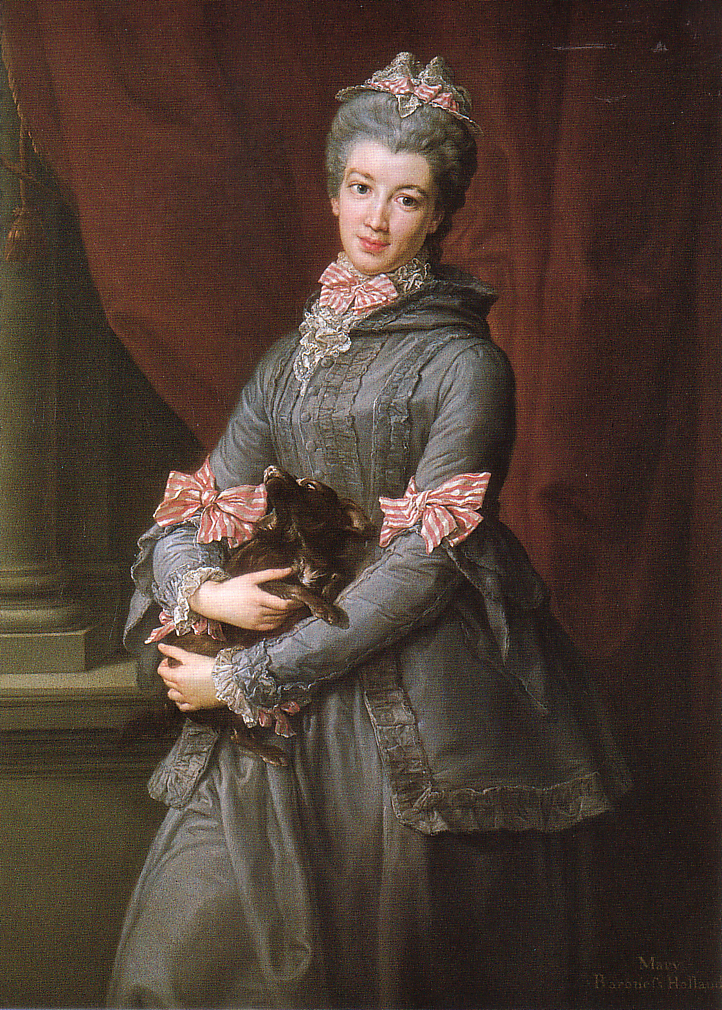
- Lady Mary Fox, c. 1767–9, by Batoni
- Born: Hon. Mary FitzPatrick; 16 March 1747; Mayfair, London, England
- Died: 6 October 1778 (aged 28); Old Windsor, Berkshire
- Spouse: Stephen Fox (m. 1766)
- Children: Henry Vassall-Fox
- Parents: John FitzPatrick, Earl of Upper Ossory (father); Lady Evelyn Leveson-Gower (mother)
- Relatives: Richard FitzPatrick (brother); John FitzPatrick (brother); Louisa FitzPatrick (sister); Richard FitzPatrick (grandfather); John Leveson-Gower (grandfather)

Mary Fox, Baroness Holland (née FitzPatrick; 16 March 1747 [O.S. 5 March 1746] – 6 October 1778), known as Lady Mary Fox from 1766–74, was an Anglo-Irish aristocrat from the Mac Giolla Phádraig dynasty and Fox family. She is best known for being the portrait subject of several notable 18th-century artists, including Thomas Gainsborough and Sir Joshua Reynolds.

== Biography ==
Lady Mary FitzPatrick was the daughter of John FitzPatrick, 2nd Baron Gowran, and his wife, Lady Evelyn (née Leveson-Gower; daughter of John Leveson-Gower, 1st Earl Gower). Her father was created Earl of Upper Ossory in 1751 and died in 1758.

She was the sister of John FitzPatrick, 2nd Earl of Upper Ossory; the Hon. General Richard FitzPatrick, Chief Secretary for Ireland (who also served twice as Secretary at War); and Lady Louisa, wife of Prime Minister Lord Shelburne.

She was the wife of Hon. Stephen Fox, whom she married on 20 April 1766. They went to Italy for their wedding tour, spending the winter of 1766–67 in Naples with family and friends, and the following spring in Rome. He inherited his family titles in 1774, from which point she was styled Lady Holland, though he died just a few months later.

She was described by her brother, the 2nd Earl of Upper Ossory, in the most glowing terms:

"Lady Holland was the most amiable person that ever lived. She possessed the most perfect sweetness of manners, joined to an excellent understanding; the most elegant person, but alas ! too delicate a frame. Her temper was the sweetest I was ever acquainted with, her heart the tenderest and most sincere. She was the best wife that ever lived, and in the most trying situation that can be conceived, nothing could exceed her tenderness of attention to her children."

Lord and Lady Holland had two children. Their son, the notable Whig politician Henry, 3rd Baron Holland (1773–1840), succeeded his father at just 13 months old. Their daughter, Hon. Caroline Fox (1767–1845), never married but kept close company with the Shelburnes.

Her husband's parents, Henry, 1st Baron Holland of Foxley and Caroline, 1st Baroness Holland of Holland, died in the summer of 1774 and he inherited their respective titles, but died just a few months later of dropsy. She died of consumption in 1778.

== In art ==
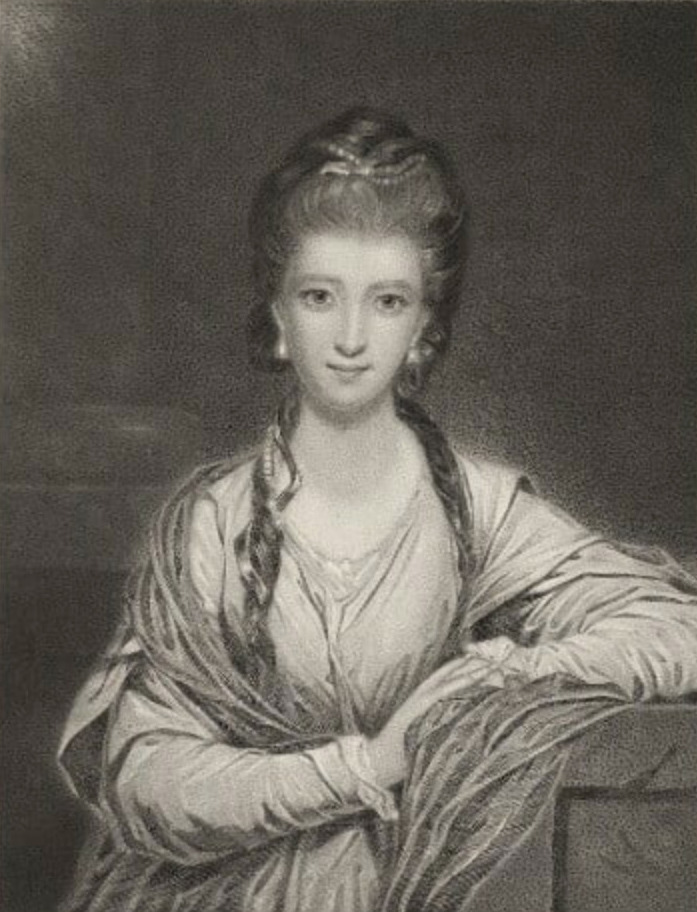
Lady Mary Fox, mezzotint by Arthur Turrel, c. 1768–9, after Reynolds

Lady Mary was painted by Thomas Gainsborough in the winter of 1764–65 and by Joshua Reynolds in 1766-69. In 1767, during her wedding tour, she was painted by Pompeo Batoni in Rome, though her portrait was apparently unfinished until 1769, when it was finally sent to England. Her portrait by Batoni, which depicts her in a grey silk Brunswick gown trimmed with striped ribbons, is considered one of his masterpieces.

While in Rome, she also met Piranesi, who 11 years later dedicated a plate to her in his 1778 collection of engravings, Vasi, candelabri, cippi, sarcofagi, tripodi, lvcerne ed ornamenti antichi. Plate 12, an etching of three vases, has the inscription A Sua Eccellenza Miledi Maria Fox.

A miniature of Lady Mary Fox after Reynolds, painted on an oval ivory plate, is in the collection of the Tsarskoye Selo State Museum in Saint Petersburg. According to the museum archive, the portrait came from the collection of the Catherine Palace. It was first publicised in 2018, when the artist was revealed to be English painter Edward Miles, who created the miniature during his 1772–92 apprenticeship with Reynolds. In 1797, Miles brought the miniature to the court of Saint Petersburg, apparently as an example of the quality of his work, with a letter of recommendation from the Russian Ambassador Count Semyon Vorontsov.
