= Katherine cross, Ampthill Park =

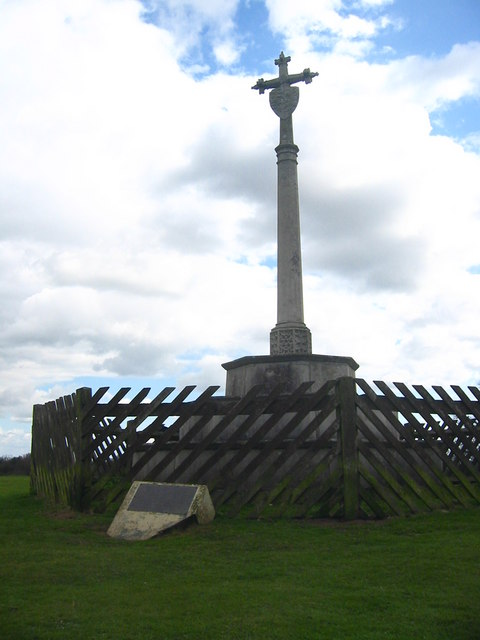

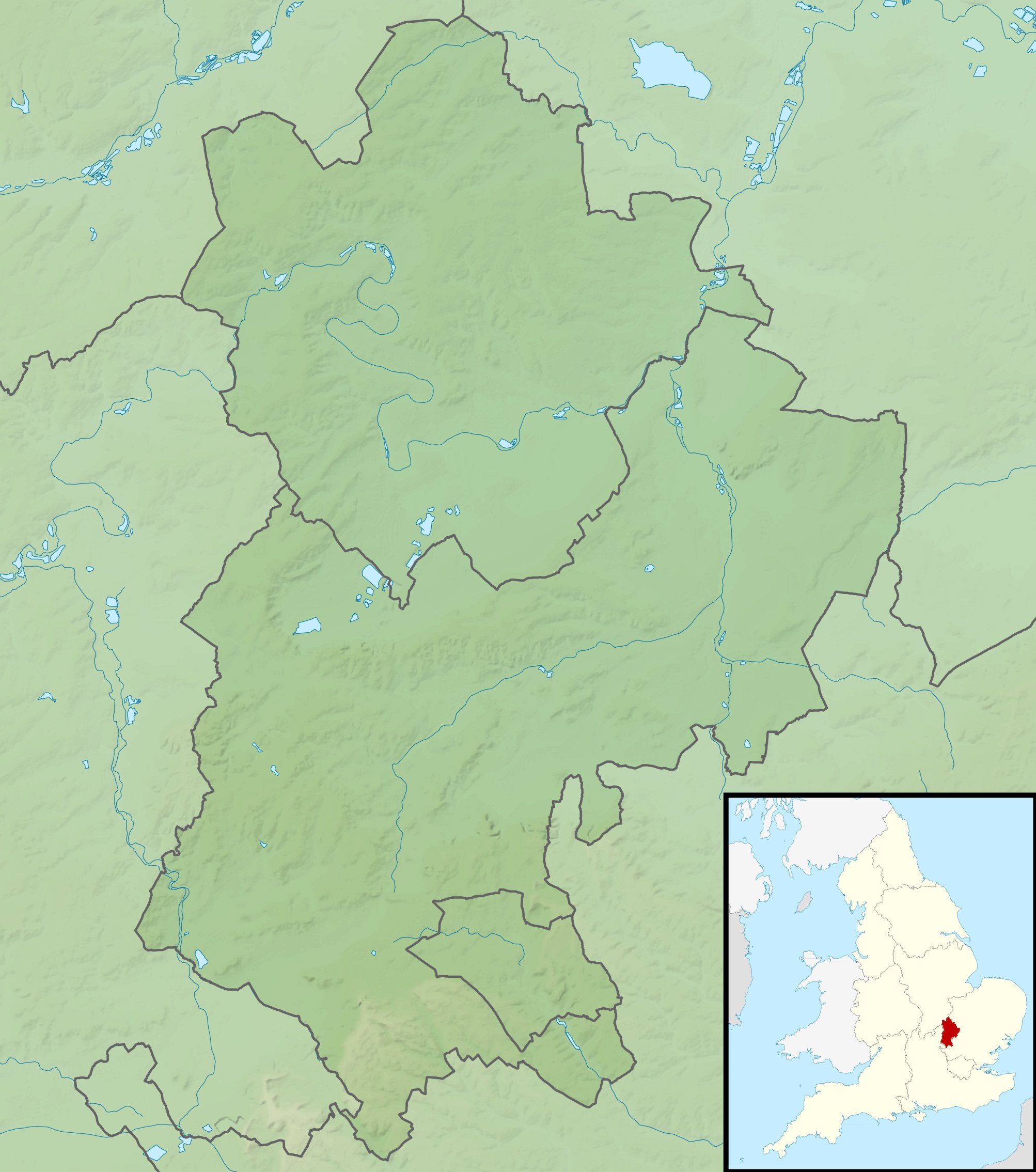
- Location within Bedfordshire
- 52.0345°N 0.5076°W
- Type: Memorial
- Location: Ampthill Park, Ampthill, Bedfordshire

History
- Built: 1773

Site notes
- Architect: James Essex
- Architectural style: Gothic revival
- Governing body: Ampthill Town Council

Listed Building – Grade II
- Official name: Katherine cross, Ampthill Park
- Designated: 17 July 1951
- Reference no.: 1114419

The Katherine cross is a memorial to Katherine of Aragon, first wife of Henry VIII. It stands in the grounds of Ampthill Park, Bedfordshire, England, on the site of a since demolished castle, Ampthill Castle, in which Katherine was confined in 1533. Raised by John FitzPatrick, 2nd Earl of Upper Ossory, then owner of the Ampthill estate, in 1773, it carries an inscription by Horace Walpole. It is a Grade II listed structure.

== History ==
Katherine of Aragon (also spelt as Catherine, historical Spanish: Catharina) (1485–1536) was the youngest child of Isabella I of Castile and Ferdinand II of Aragon. In 1501 she married Arthur, Prince of Wales, eldest son of King Henry VII of England. After Arthur's death the same year, Katherine married the king's second son, Henry VIII on his accession in 1509. By the 1520s, Henry's frustration with their joint failure to produce a male heir, and his fascination with Anne Boleyn, led him to divorce Katherine in 1526, a decision which heralded the English Reformation. Katherine was expelled from court and confined to a series of country houses, including Ampthill Castle, dying at Kimbolton Castle in 1536.

John FitzPatrick, 2nd Earl of Upper Ossory (1745–1818) was an Irish peer, landowner, soldier, member of parliament for Bedfordshire (Note: John Fitzpatrick made little impact as a member of parliament, his "sole political ambition (being) the pursuit of a British peerage".) and owner of the Ampthill Park estate in the county. A close friend of Horace Walpole, Fitzpatrick sought his advice on the construction of a monument to Katherine on the site of Ampthill Castle on his Bedfordshire estate, where Katherine had been incarcerated in 1533. The monument, in the form of a cross, was designed by James Essex, though it is possible that he worked from an original sketch by Walpole, and erected in 1773. It carries an inscription that was certainly composed by Walpole.

IN DAYS OF OLD HERE AMPTHILL'S TOWERS WERE SEEN
THE MOURNFUL REFUGE OF AN INJURED QUEEN
HERE FLOW'D HER PURE BUT UNAVAILING TEARS
HERE BLINDED ZEAL SUSTAIN'D HER SINKING YEARS
YET FREEDOM HENCE HER RADIANT BANNER WAV'D
AND LOVE AVENG'D A REALM BY PRIEST'S ENSLAVED
FROM CATHERINES WRONGS A NATION'S BLISS WAS SPREAD
AND LUTHER'S LIGHT FROM HENRY'S LAWLESS BED

— Memorial inscription

== Architecture and description ==
The monument takes the form of a cross, standing on a stepped, octagonal base. The base is decorated with tracery and the arms of the cross end in miniature crosses in foliage. Charles O'Brien, in his Bedfordshire, Huntingdonshire and Peterborough volume in the Pevsner Buildings of England series, revised and reissued in 2014, notes the "close and dainty" nature of the decorative work. The structure is to a Gothic revival design, and incorporates a heraldic shield with the coats of arms of England and Aragon. The construction material is stone. By the monument Fitzpatrick sought to commemorate both Katherine, and the site of Ampthill Castle, which had been demolished in the previous century. (Note: Although titled a "castle", Ampthill was in fact a fortified and moated manor house built in the early 15th century by John Cornwall, 1st Baron Fanhope. It came into the possession of Henry VIII in 1524 and was demolished after falling into ruin in the early 17th century. The wider estate, now a public park, features landscaping by Capability Brown.) Fitzpatrick's additional motivation was to have a garden feature to enhance his park and it is possible that the concept of the memorial cross was suggested by Walpole.

== Sources ==
- O'Brien, Charles; Pevsner, Nikolaus (2014). Bedfordshire, Huntingdonshire and Peterborough. The Buildings of England. New Haven, US and London: Yale University Press. ISBN 978-0-300-20821-4.
- Yorke, Philip Chesney (1911). "Catherine of Aragon" . Encyclopædia Britannica. Vol. 5 (11th ed.). pp. 529–531.
- This article incorporates text from a publication now in the public domain: Clark, John Willis (1889). "Essex, James". In Stephen, Leslie (ed.). Dictionary of National Biography. Vol. 18. London: Smith, Elder & Co. pp. 5, 6, 7.
