= James Essex =

British architect & builder (1722–1784)

James Essex (1722–1784) was an English builder and architect who mostly worked in Cambridge, where he was born. He designed portions of many colleges of the University of Cambridge, and carried out major restorations of the cathedrals at Ely and Lincoln. He was an admirer of Gothic architecture, and assembled materials for a history of the style, though the book remained unpublished.

== Early life ==
Essex was born in Cambridge in August 1722. He is the son of a builder of the same name who had fitted the sash windows and wainscot in the Senate House (1724-5), under James Gibbs, and had worked on the hall of Queens' College, Cambridge (1732-4). He had a grammar school education at the school of King's College, Cambridge, and then studied under Sir James Burrough. When his father died in February 1749, Essex took over his business, and, in September 1749, built the Mathematical Bridge at Queens' College.

=== Cambridge colleges ===
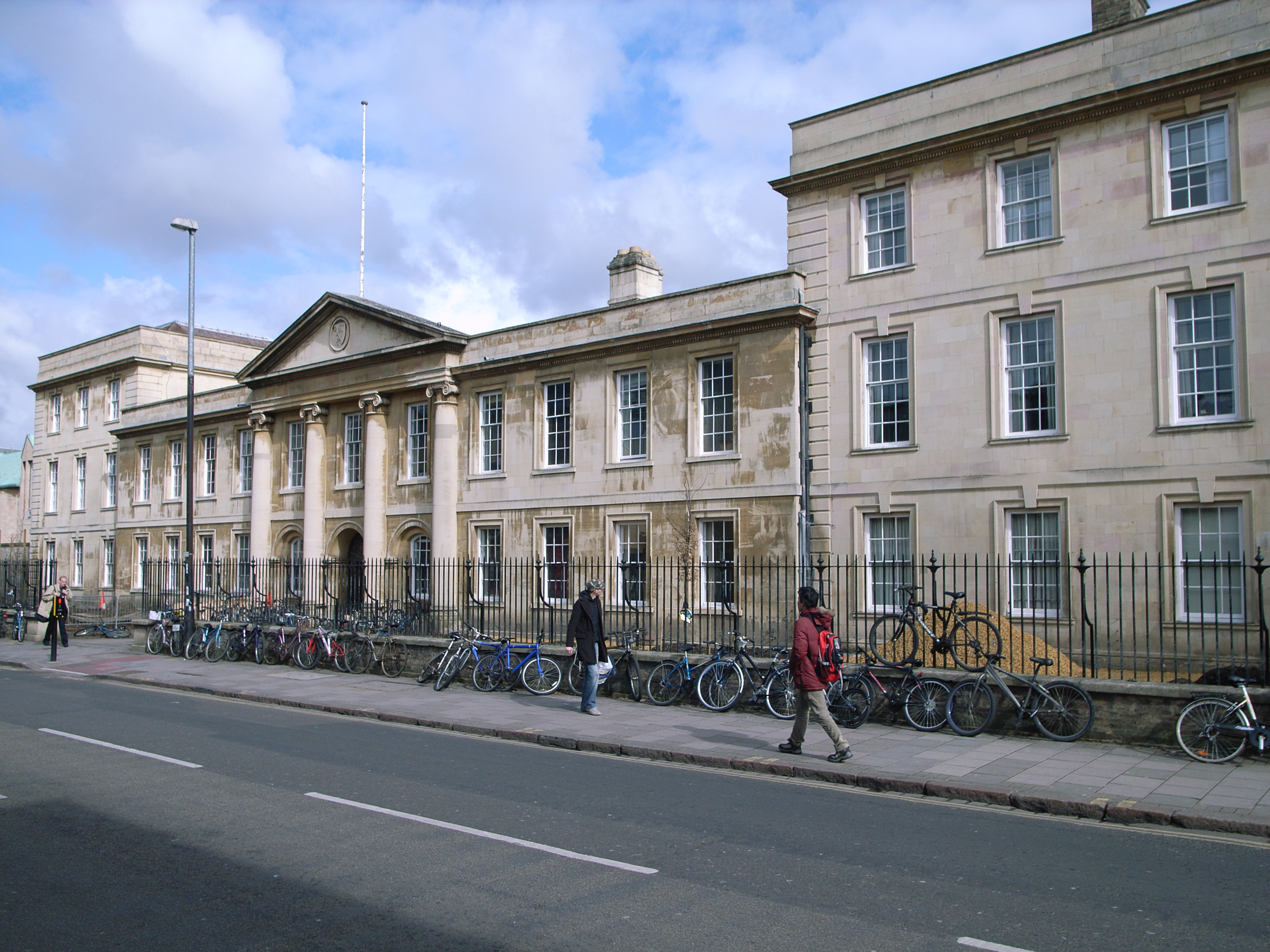
Street front of Emmanuel College, Cambridge (1769), design by Essex

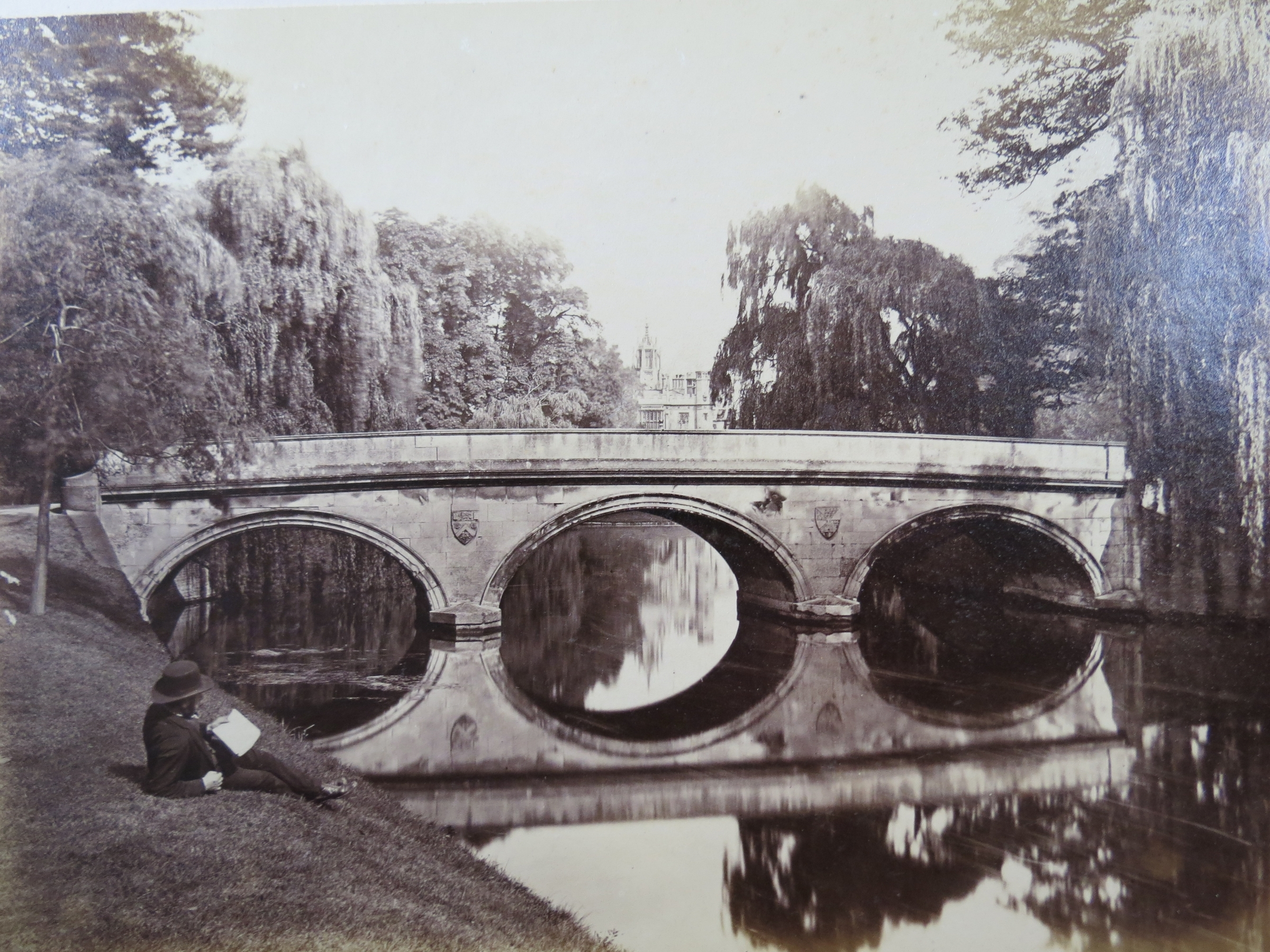
Trinity College Bridge designed and built by James Essex

For the next 25 years he was occupied with work for Cambridge colleges. In 1757 he designed and built the Ramsden Building at St Catharine's College in a design matching that of the late 17th-century parts of the college; and in 1758 he repaired and altered Nevile's Court at Trinity College. In 1760 he designed and built the new west range at Queens' College, a white-brick building described by Nikolaus Pevsner as "impeccable of its kind but somewhat dull". His plans to extend the new structure northwards, in place of the existing 15th-century buildings, were never carried out. In 1764 he repaired and altered the hall at Emmanuel College; in 1766 he designed and built the stone bridge at Trinity College. In 1769 he ashlared the first court of Christ's College and completed the chapel at Clare College after the death of Burrough. In 1775, he rebuilt the former Great Hall of Trinity College as the new "Combination Room" with an ashlared Classical front towards the Great Court, and designed and built the west front of Emmanuel College. In 1776, he designed and set up the altarpiece at King's College Chapel, with the wainscot round the sacrarium, and altered the south side of the first court of St John's College; between 1778 and 1782 he made the bookcases for the library, and designed and built the chapel at Sidney Sussex College.

In 1751, he fitted up the "dome room" at the University Library for manuscripts; bookcases he designed for the old library in 1731–34 are in the current University Library. In 1768 he completed the west end of the Senate House, left unfinished by Gibbs.

In 1754, he rebuilt Magdalene Bridge. In 1784 he designed and built the old Cambridge Guildhall.

=== Ecclesiastical work ===
In his works at Cambridge (except for the altarpiece at King's College), Essex used the Italianate style which he had learnt from Burrough; but he was an admirer of the then despised Gothic style, and was a pioneer professional architect in imitations of medieval English architecture.

In 1757, he was consulted by the dean and chapter of Ely Cathedral. Over the next five years he restored the east front, and repaired the roof of the eastern limb of the church, together with the woodwork of the lantern, which neglect had brought to a dangerous condition. Finally, he moved the choir from its original position to the east end of the presbytery (work not completed until 1770). The repairs executed between 1757 and 1762 were carried out conservatively, the old timber being, where possible, preserved; but Essex recommended the destruction of the west porch, as "neither ornamental nor useful".

In 1760 he built the doctors' gallery in Great St Mary's Church (Burrough, architect), and the next year accepted a major commission at Lincoln Cathedral, where substantial repairs were needed. Besides these he constructed an arch under the west tower, repaved the entire church, repaired the choir screen, and designed an altarpiece and bishop's throne. Here, also, Essex tried to get the choir removed to the same position as at Ely, but without success. In 1775 he designed and put up the four spires and battlement of the central tower.

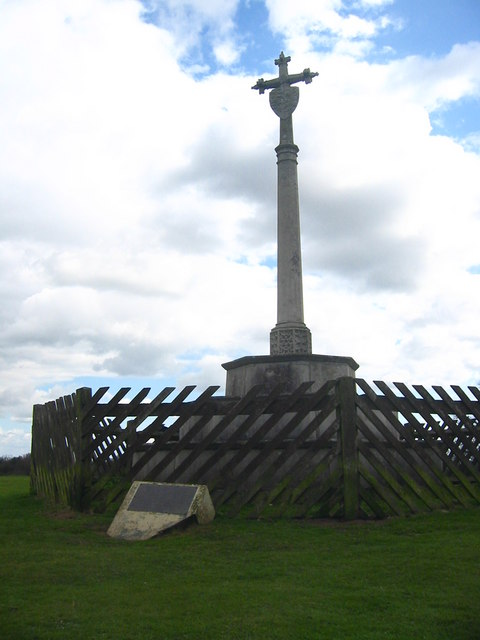
Katherine cross, Ampthill Park

Essex also restored the tower of Winchester College Chapel, altered Madingley Hall, Cambridge, and built the steeple of the parish church at Debden, Essex. At Ampthill Park, Bedfordshire he built the Katherine cross to commemorate Queen Catherine of Aragon, erected in 1773 for the Earl of Ossory. The design followed a rough sketch by Horace Walpole.

== Associations and reputation ==
He was a close friend of Michael Tyson, Thomas Kerrich, Richard Gough, James Bentham, William Cole (whose house at Milton, Cambridge he built, and who made him his executor), Horace Walpole and other well-known antiquaries. For a few years he was Walpole's architect at his Gothick villa, Strawberry Hill, where he added the Beauclerk Tower in 1777.

He was elected Fellow of the Society of Antiquaries 23 January 1772, through Gough, and contributed papers to Archæologia on architectural history. In 1756 he issued proposals for engraving views, plans, and sections of King's College Chapel; the scheme of this work, with plates drawn by his own hand, was among the manuscripts which, after his death, passed to Thomas Kerrich, who bequeathed them to the British Museum. The same collection contained the manuscript and many of the illustrations for his unfinished History of Gothic Architecture.

In 1748, when Essex was 26, he became involved in a controversy with the Rev. Robert Masters, fellow and historian of Corpus Christi College, over the authorship of a plan for adding a new court to the college. In December 1747 Masters had employed Essex to draw a plan, which he then had engraved and circulated as his own. Essex published proposals for engraving and printing by subscription his own design, and, in February 1749, published a pamphlet in which he criticised Masters's design and conduct.

== Family ==
Essex married Elizabeth Thurlbourne, the daughter of a Cambridge bookseller. They had two children: James, who died in infancy in 1757, and Millicent, who married, on 10 May 1785, the Rev. John Hammond, sometime fellow of Queens' College. She died in January 1787.

== Death ==
Essex died in Cambridge of a paralytic stroke on 14 September 1784, in his sixty-third year. He was buried in St Botolph's churchyard, Cambridge, on the south side of the church, where a tomb commemorates him, his father, mother, wife, and children. He and his children are further commemorated by a tablet in the north aisle.

== Published writings ==
Essex acknowledged the following works:

- "Proposals for Engraving and Printing a Plan of an intended Addition to Corpus Christi College, Cambridge", 20 September 1748.
- "Whereas Mr. Masters ...", 4 October 1748. – An advertisement.
- "Mr. James Essex's Letter to his Subscribers to the Plan", 20 February 1748–9.
- "Proposals for Engraving Views, Plans, and Sections of King's College Chapel", 1 October 1756 (Gough, Brit. Top. i. 237).
- "Letter to Dr. Ducarel, containing observations on Canterbury Cathedral", 1 February 1768 (Nichols, Bibliographia Topographica Britannia i. 470).
- "Plan of the original Cathedral Church of Ely, with an account of the several Alterations and Additions" (Bentham, Ely, 1812, addenda, pp. 1–8).
- "Account of the Old Conventual Church at Ely" (Bentham, Ely, 1812, addenda, pp. 9, 10).
- "Remarks on the Antiquity and the different Modes of Brick and Stone Buildings in England" (Archæologia, iv. 73).
- "Observations on Lincoln Cathedral" (Archæologia iv. 149).
- "Observations on the Origin and Antiquity of Round Churches, and of the Round Church at Cambridge in particular" (Archæologia vi. 163).
- "Observations on Croyland Abbey and Bridge" (Nichols, Bibliographia Topographica Britannia No. xxii.)
- "Description and Plan of the Ancient Timber Bridge at Rochester" (Archæologia, vii. 395).
- "Description and Plan of Denny Abbey, Cambs." (Lysons, Cambridgeshire, pp. 272–4).

Besides these, his description of the old chapel of Sidney Sussex College, and his "Journal of a Tour through part of Flanders and France in August 1773", were printed after his death.

== Sources ==
- Pevsner, Nikolaus (1954). Cambridgeshire. The Buildings of England. Harmondsworth: Penguin Books.
- Summerson, John (1970). Architecture in Britain, 1530 to 1830. Pelican History of Art. Harmondsworth: Penguin Books. p. 403.

Attribution

This article incorporates text from a publication now in the public domain: Clark, John Willis (1889). "Essex, James". In Stephen, Leslie (ed.). Dictionary of National Biography. Vol. 18. London: Smith, Elder & Co. pp. 5, 6, 7.
