= Louisa Petty, Marchioness of Lansdowne =

Second wife of William Petty, 2nd Earl of Shelburne (1755–1789)

The Most Honourable The Marchioness of Lansdowne
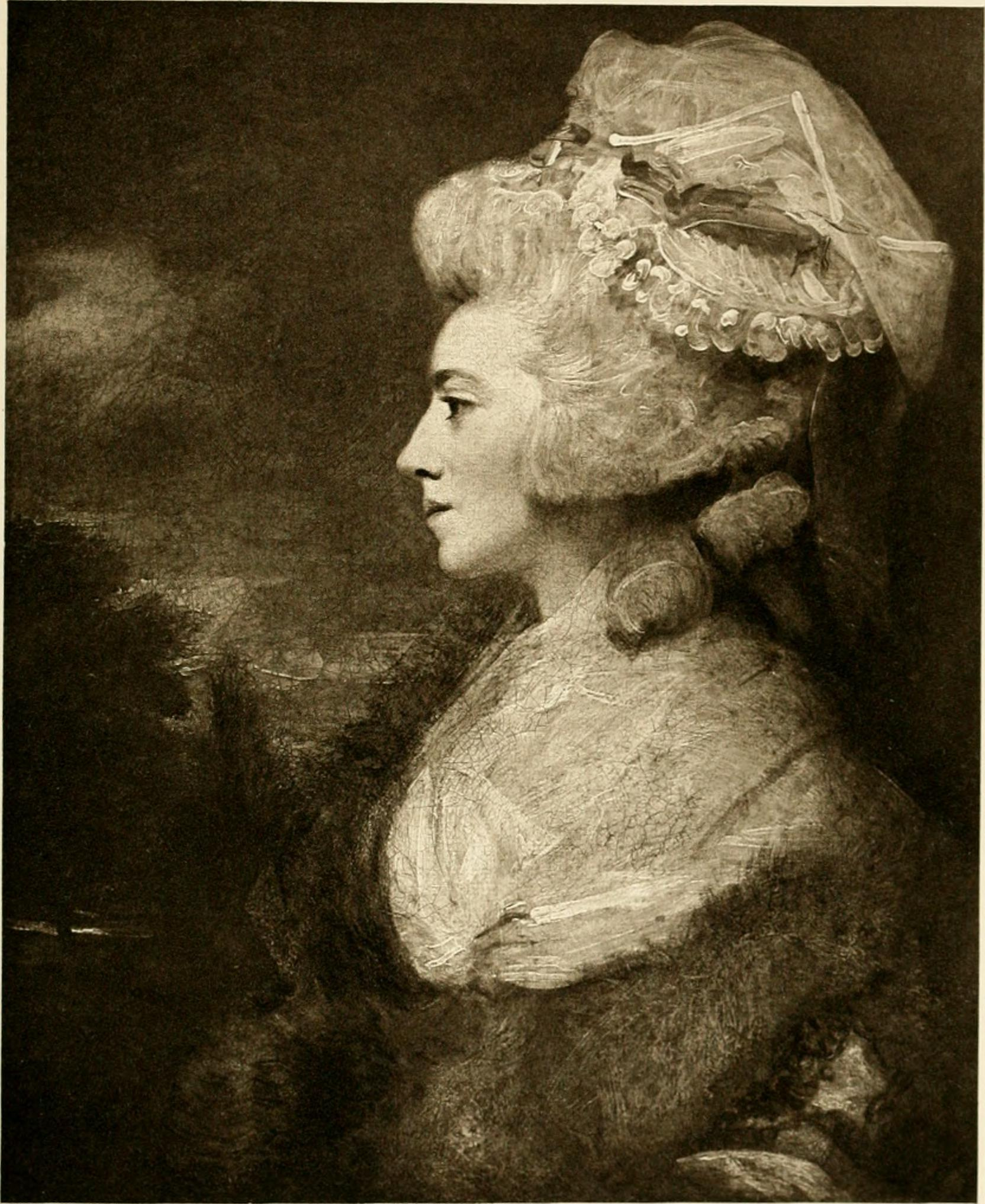
- Portrait of Lady Lansdowne
- Born: 1755
- Died: 7 August 1789
- Spouse: William Petty (m. 1779)
- Children: 2, including Henry
- Father: John FitzPatrick
- Relatives: Richard FitzPatrick (brother); Mary FitzPatrick (sister); John FitzPatrick (brother); Richard FitzPatrick (grandfather); John Leveson-Gower (grandfather)

Louisa Petty, Marchioness of Lansdowne (née Lady Louisa FitzPatrick; later Petty Fitzmaurice; 1755 – 7 August 1789), known as the Countess of Shelburne from 1779–84, was an Anglo-Irish aristocrat from the Mac Giolla Phádraig dynasty. She was the wife of Prime Minister William Petty, 2nd Earl of Shelburne.

== Biography ==
The Marchioness was the youngest daughter of John FitzPatrick, 1st Earl of Upper Ossory, and his wife, Lady Evelyn (née Leveson-Gower; daughter of John Leveson-Gower, 1st Earl Gower).

Her eldest brother was John FitzPatrick, 2nd Earl of Upper Ossory. She had a younger brother Richard, who also became a noted statesman and soldier, and an elder sister, Lady Mary Fox (Baroness Holland), the subject of paintings by Thomas Gainsborough, Sir Joshua Reynolds, and Pompeo Batoni.

She married, as his second wife, William Petty, 2nd Earl of Shelburne, who served as Prime Minister for 10 months in 1782–83, and was afterwards created Marquess of Lansdowne. The couple were married on 8 July 1779

- Lady Louisa Fitzmaurice Petty, died young
- Lord Henry Petty (1780–1863), who succeeded his elder half-brother as 3rd Marquess

She died on 7 August 1789.
