= John FitzPatrick, 2nd Earl of Upper Ossory =

Irish peer and member of parliament (1745–1818)

The Right Honourable The Earl of Upper Ossory FRS DL
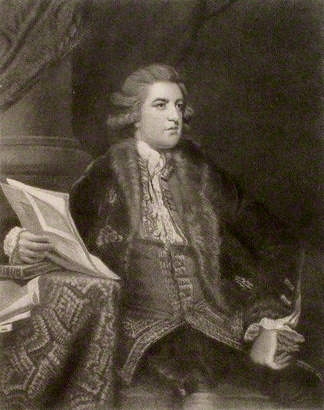
- The Earl of Upper Ossory

Member of Parliament for Bedfordshire
- In office 1767–1794

Personal details
- Born: 2 May 1745 Mayfair, London, England
- Died: 13 February 1818 (aged 72) Ampthill Park, Bedfordshire
- Spouse: Anne Fitzroy (m. 1769)
- Children: 3+, including John
- Parent: John FitzPatrick (father)
- Relatives: Richard FitzPatrick (brother); Mary FitzPatrick (sister); Louisa FitzPatrick (sister); Richard FitzPatrick (grandfather); John Leveson-Gower (grandfather)
- Military career
- Rank: Colonel
- Unit: Bedfordshire Militia
- Wars: Seven Years' War; American War of Independence; French Revolutionary War

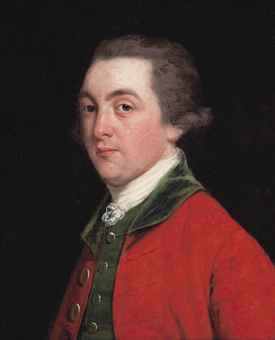
The 2nd Earl of Upper Ossory by Thomas Beach.

John FitzPatrick, 2nd Earl of Upper Ossory FRS DL (2 May [O.S. 21 April] 1745 – 13 February 1818), styled Lord Gowran from 1751–8, was an Anglo-Irish peer, soldier, and member of parliament.

== Early life ==
Hon. John FitzPatrick was born in 1745 at his family's home in Berkeley Square, Mayfair, the eldest son of John FitzPatrick, 2nd Baron Gowran, and Lady Evelyn (née Leveson-Gower, pronounced Lewson Gore; daughter of John Leveson-Gower, 1st Earl Gower). He had a younger brother Richard, who also became a noted statesman and soldier, and two younger sisters, Lady Mary and Lady Louisa.

Her father was created Earl of Upper Ossory in 1751 but died in 1758, at which point the teenager succeeded to his father's titles of Earl of Upper Ossory and Baron Gowran. As there were both titles in the Irish peerage, he was not entitled to a seat in the British House of Lords (but he had a seat in the Irish House of Lords, until the Act of Union in 1800).

His mother remarried to politician Richard Vernon and had at least two more children with him.

== Career ==
In 1767, FitzPatrick was elected to the House of Commons for Bedfordshire, a seat he held until 1794.

He was also Lord Lieutenant of Bedfordshire from 1771 to 1818. He had been appointed a captain in the Bedfordshire Militia when it was reformed in 1760 during the Seven Years' War, and assumed the colonelcy of the disembodied regiment when he became Lord Lieutenant of Bedfordshire. The regiment was embodied again for home defence during the American War of Independence and the French Revolutionary War. He gave up the colonelcy on 25 June 1795 while remaining lord lieutenant.

In 1794, he was given the title of Baron Upper Ossory, of Ampthill in the County of Bedford, in the Peerage of Great Britain, which gave him a seat in the House of Lords.

In 1763, Fitzpatrick was in Italy with the bibliophile Topham Beauclerk, where he bought old-master paintings and commissioned paintings from Gavin Hamilton. His is also thought to have been a patron of John Higton, given his depiction of Dogs at Ampthill Park in 1810.

== Personal life ==
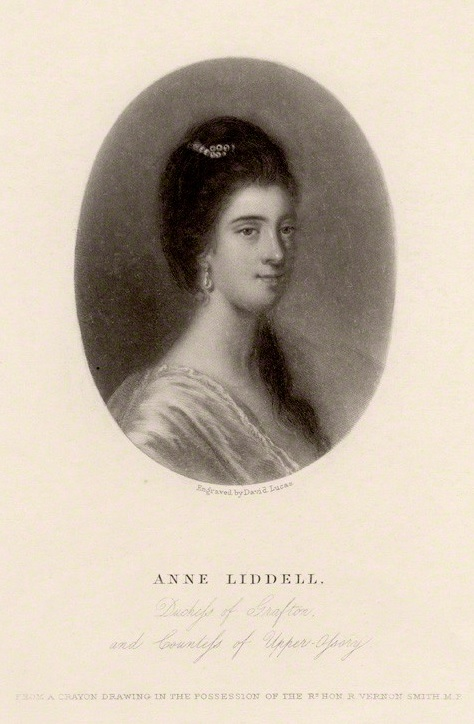
Anne Liddell, Countess of Upper Ossory

Like his younger brother Richard, Ossory was a friend of Charles James Fox, whilst their half-sister Lady Mary FitzPatrick (1747–1778) had married Fox's older brother Stephen Fox, 2nd Baron Holland (1745–1774). As such, Fitzpatrick became a father figure to his nephew Henry Vassall-Fox (1773–1740) on the death of his parents when he was young.

While in Europe in the early 1763, Ossory met Horace Walpole, who in 1766 introduced him to the unhappily married Anne FitzRoy, Duchess of Grafton, the wife of the philandering Augustus Fitzroy, 3rd Duke of Grafton (who fathered 16 illegitimate children in his lifetime). They began an affair while she was separated from Grafton, who had begun a public affair with Anne Parsons, a courtesan, in 1764, and had separated from his wife in January 1765.

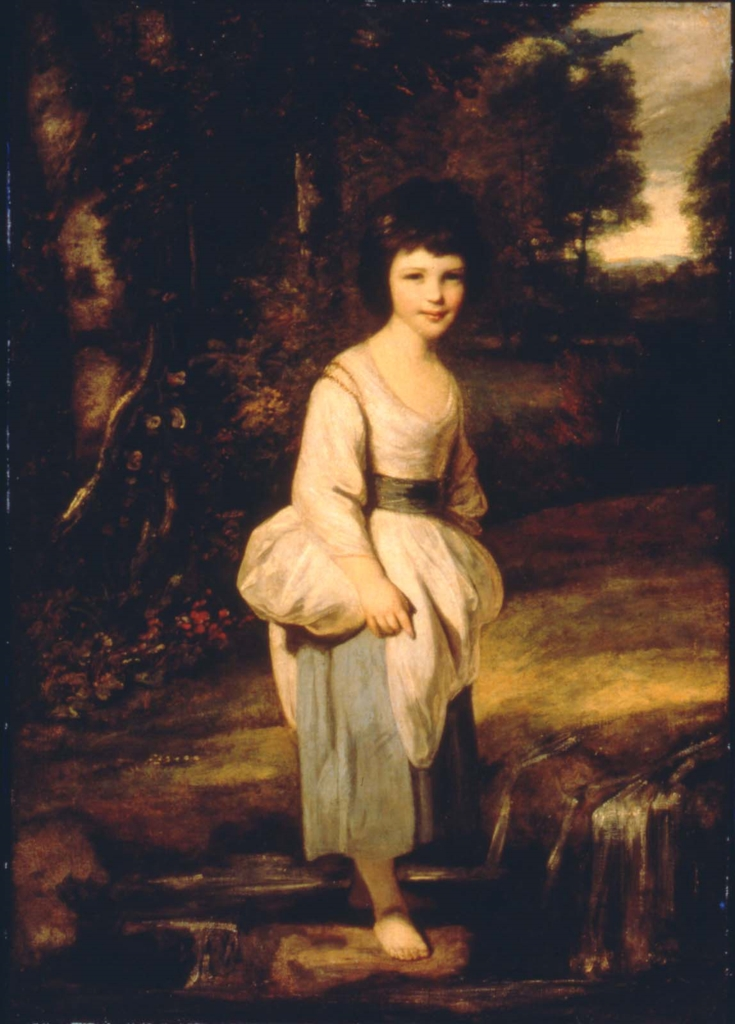
Lady Anne FitzPatrick by Sir Joshua Reynolds, c. 1775

In August 1768, the Duchess of Grafton gave birth to Ossory's daughter, also named Anne. The Duke of Grafton, who that fall assumed the role of Prime Minister, sued her for divorce on the grounds of adultery. They were divorced by Act of Parliament in 1769, and she married Ossory that same year, three days after Grafton married Elizabeth Wrottesley. Wrottesley was ironically Ossory's cousin, the daughter of his aunt Lady Mary Leveson-Gower and Sir Richard Wrottesley, 7th Baronet.

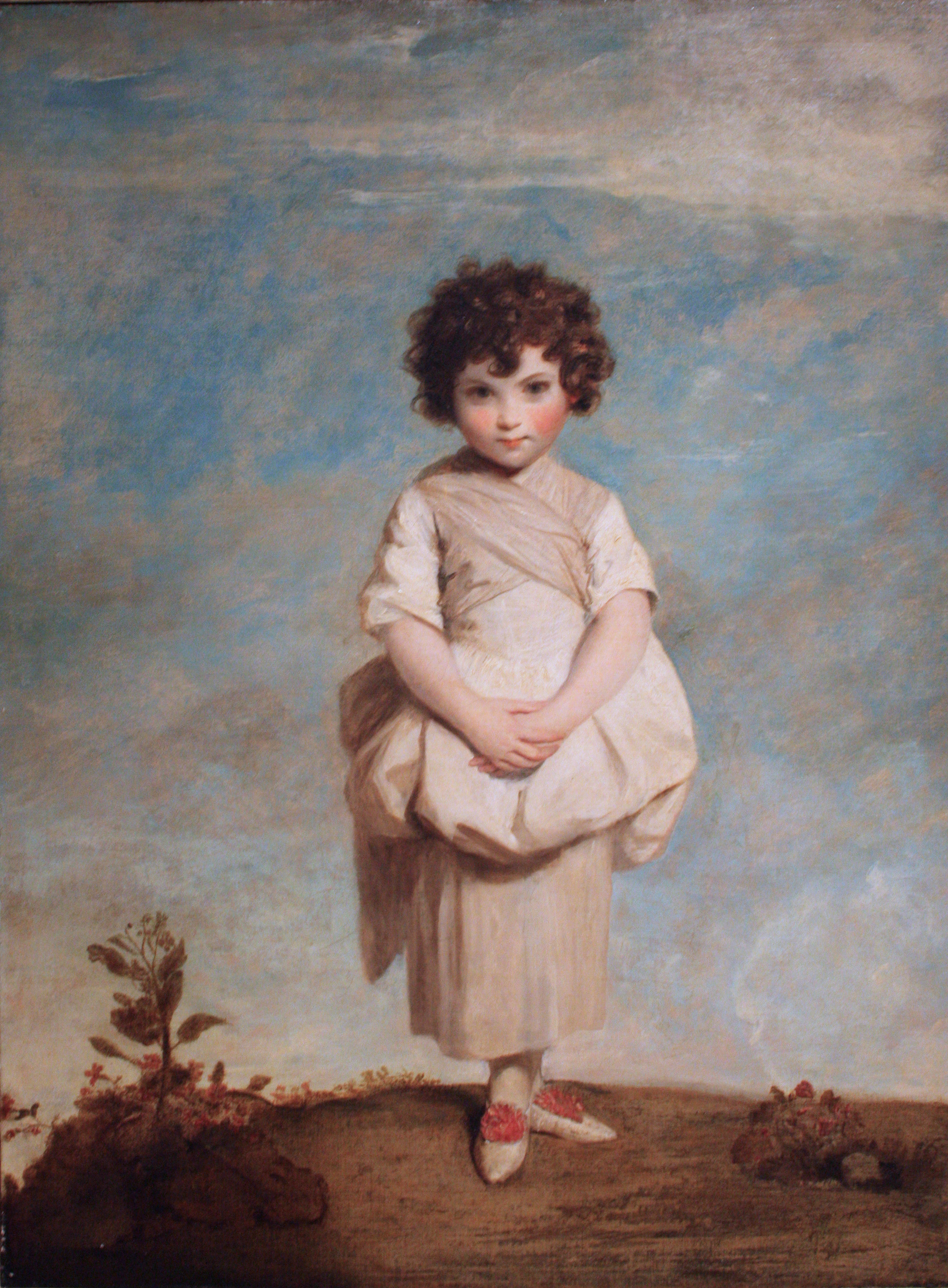
Lady Gertrude FitzPatrick by Reynolds, c. 1779

They had one more surviving daughter, Lady Gertrude, in 1774, and lived at Ampthill Park. As divorcées were not allowed in the Royal Court, the Countess of Upper Ossory rarely went to London and lived a quiet life at Ampthill. She died at Ampthill in 1804.

After her death, had two surviving illegitimate children with an Elizabeth Wilson in London. The earl died in February 1818, aged 72, when both baronies and the earldom became extinct.

Some of his estates in England, including Ampthill Park, were inherited by his nephew Henry Vassall-Fox, 3rd Baron Holland.

His illegitimate children were raised at Ampthill under the guardianship of Holland and their half-sisters, Lady Anne and Lady Gertrude. They both inherited considerable estates and became peers. His son, John, inherited his estates in Ireland and adopted the FitzPatrick surname in 1841. He was raised to the peerage as Baron Castletown in 1869.

His daughter Emma Mary inherited his estates at Fermyn Woods, Lyvedon, and Grafton. In 1823, she married Robert Vernon, the grandson of Ossory's stepfather. In 1859, Robert Vernon was raised to the peerage as Baron Lyveden.

=== Issue ===
Ossory had three daughters with Anne Liddell:

- Lady Anne Fitzpatrick (23 August 1768 – 14 December 1841), legitimised by her parents' marriage in March 1769
- Lady Mary (born 24 February 1770), died as an infant
- Lady Gertrude Fitzpatrick (7 August 1774 – 30 September 1841)

He had three illegitimate children with Elizabeth Wilson, who were all baptised by Rev. Dr. Luke Heslop on 28 February 1813 at St Marylebone Parish Church.

- Emma Mary Wilson (5 April 1806 – 25 September 1882), who married in 1823 Robert Vernon Smith
- John Wilson (later FitzPatrick; 1807/9–1883), raised to the peerage in 1869 as Baron Castletown
- Richard Wilson (21 November 1810 – after 1818), died young

Parliament of Great Britain
Preceded by Marquess of Tavistock; Robert Henley-Ongley	Member of Parliament for Bedfordshire; 1767–1794; With: Robert Henley-Ongley 1767–1780; St Andrew St John 1780–1784; The Lord Ongley 1784–1785; St Andrew St John 1784–1794	Succeeded by St Andrew St John; John Osborn
Honorary titles
Preceded by The Duke of Bedford	Lord Lieutenant of Bedfordshire; 1771–1818	Succeeded by The Lord Grantham
Peerage of Ireland
Preceded by John FitzPatrick	Earl of Upper Ossory; 1758–1818	Extinct
Peerage of Great Britain
New title	Baron Upper Ossory; 1794–1818	Extinct
