= Fitzpatrick Vernon, 2nd Baron Lyveden =

Fitzpatrick Henry Vernon, 2nd Baron Lyveden (27 April 1824 – 25 February 1900) was a British peer and Liberal Party politician.

== Biography ==
Vernon was born in 1824, the eldest son of Robert Smith (1800–1873) and grandson of Robert Percy Smith. Both his father and grandfather were members of parliament. His father received Royal licence to change the family name to Vernon in lieu of Smith in 1846, taking the surname of his own mother, and was created Baron Lyveden in 1859. He had married, in 1823, Lady Emma Mary Fitzpatrick (d.1882), daughter and co-heir of the 2nd and last Earl of Upper Ossory. Fitzpatrick succeeded his father as second baron in 1873.

Vernon was educated at Eton College and Durham University. He entered the diplomatic service and served as attaché to Madrid from 1846 to 1848, to Hanover from 1848 to 1849, and to Berlin from 1849 to 1850. He returned home as private secretary to Lord Seymour, Commissioner of Woods and Forests in 1850, and was then secretary to his father while he served as Secretary of War for a month in 1852, and as President of the Board of Control from 1855 to 1858. Duriung this period he unsuccessfully contested the North Northamptonshire parliamentary seat as a liberal in 1857 and the South Northamptonshire seat the following year.

Lord Lyveden was a Justice of the peace and Deputy Lieutenant for Northamptonshire.

== Family ==
Vernon married, on 21 June 1853, Lady Albreda Elizabeth Wentworth-Fitzwilliam (1829–1891), youngest daughter of the 5th Earl Fitzwilliam. Following his first wife's death in 1891, Lord Lyvenden re-married in 1896 Julia Kate Emary, youngest daughter of Albert Emary, of Hastings. He left no children with either wife.

He died in London on 25 February 1900, when the barony was inherited by his nephew Courtenay Robert Percy Vernon (1857–1926), son of his brother Hon. Courtenay John Vernon (1828–1892).

Peerage of the United Kingdom
Preceded by Robert Vernon	Baron Lyveden; 1873–1900	Succeeded by Courtenay Robert Percy Vernon
