= Brunswick (clothing) =

18th-century women's gown

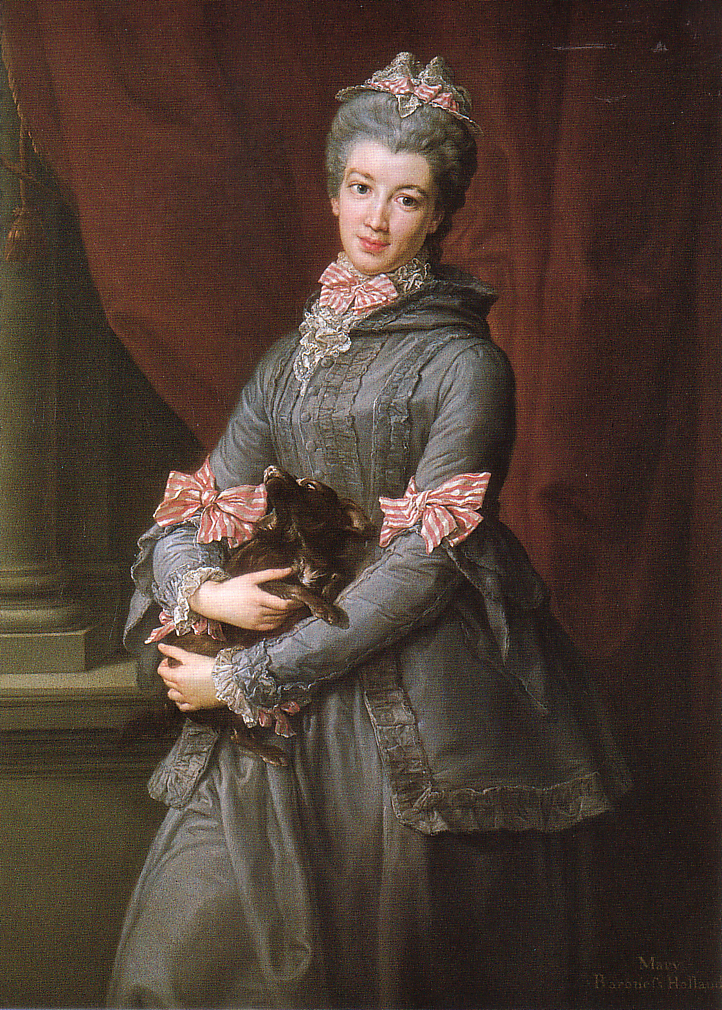
This grey silk Brunswick is trimmed with striped ribbons. Lady Mary Fox by Pompeo Batoni, 1767.

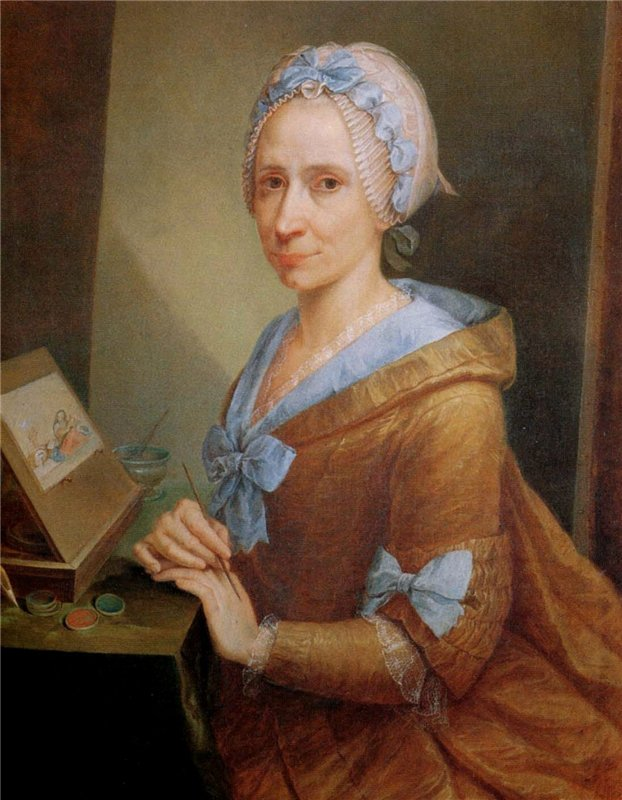
Self-Portrait at the Age of 56, 1776, oil on canvas, in the collection of the Uffizi

A Brunswick gown or Brunswick is a two-piece woman's gown of the mid-eighteenth century.

== Description ==
The Brunswick comprises a hip-length (or three-quarter length) jacket with a high neckline and a hood, worn with a matching petticoat. The jacket sleeves consist of an upper sleeve with flounces at the elbow and a tight, wrist-length lower sleeve.

The Brunswick is one of several informal jacket-and-petticoat costumes popular in the later 18th century, derived from working class costume but made up in fine fabrics (usually silk).

Originating in France (based on a German fashion), the Brunswick was also popular in England and the United States as a traveling costume.

Today, the term is generically used to describe a hip-length, close-fitting padded coat with a neckline (and not necessarily with a hood).

== Paintings depicting Brunswicks ==
- Portrait of Lady Mary Fox by Pompeo Batoni, 1767.
- Self-portrait of Anna Bacherini Piattoli, 1776.
- Portrait of a Girl Holding a Spaniel by Alexander Roslin.

== Bibliography ==
- Baumgarten, Linda: What Clothes Reveal: The Language of Clothing in Colonial and Federal America, Yale University Press, 2002. ISBN 0-300-09580-5
- Ribeiro, Aileen: The Art of Dress: Fashion in England and France 1750–1820, Yale University Press, 1995, ISBN 0-300-06287-7
- Ribeiro, Aileen: Dress in Eighteenth Century Europe 1715–1789, Yale University Press, 2002, ISBN 0-300-09151-6
