= Robert Vernon, 1st Baron Lyveden =

British Liberal Party politician

The Right Honourable The Lord Lyveden GCB PC
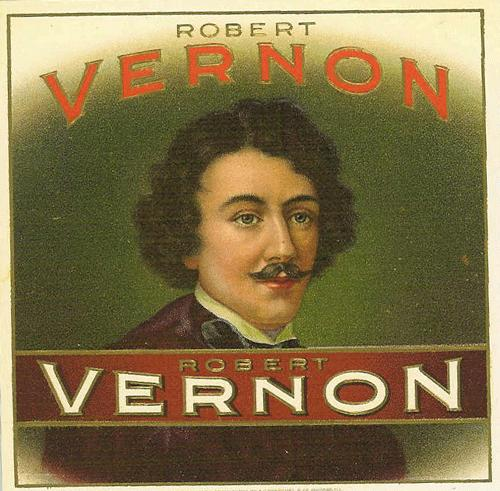

Secretary at War
- In office 6 February 1852 – 21 February 1852
- Monarch: Victoria
- Prime Minister: Lord John Russell
- Preceded by: Hon. Fox Maule
- Succeeded by: William Beresford

President of the Board of Control
- In office 3 March 1855 – 21 February 1858
- Monarch: Victoria
- Prime Minister: The Viscount Palmerston
- Preceded by: Sir Charles Wood, Bt
- Succeeded by: The Earl of Ellenborough

Personal details
- Born: 23 February 1800
- Died: 10 November 1873 (aged 73)
- Party: Whig; Liberal Party
- Spouse: Emma Mary Fitzpatrick
- Education: Christ Church, Oxford

Robert Vernon, 1st Baron Lyveden (23 February 1800 – 10 November 1873), known as Robert Vernon Smith until 1859, was a British Whig and then Liberal Party politician.

== Background and education ==
Vernon was the son of Robert Percy Smith, of 20 Savile Row, London, and of Cheam, Surrey, and the nephew of The Rev. Sydney Smith, Canon of St Paul's. His mother was Carolina Maria Vernon, daughter of Richard Vernon. Vernon was educated at Christ Church, Oxford (2nd class classics 1822).

== Political career ==
He was elected Member of Parliament for Tralee in 1829, a seat he held until 1831, and then sat for Northampton from 1831 to 1859. When the Whigs came to power in 1830 under Lord Grey, Vernon was appointed a Lord of the Treasury (government whip), which he remained also when Lord Melbourne became Prime Minister in July 1834. The Whigs fell from office in November of that year, but returned already in April 1835, when Vernon was appointed Secretary of the Board of Control by Melbourne, which he remained until 1839. He then served as Under-Secretary of State for War and the Colonies from 1839 to 1841. The latter year he was also admitted to the Privy Council. He did not hold office again until February 1852, when he was made Secretary at War in the first administration of Lord John Russell. However, the government fell already the same month. When the Liberals (as the Whigs were now known) returned to office in 1855 under Lord Palmerston, Vernon was appointed President of the Board of Control, with a seat in the cabinet, a post he retained until the government fell in March 1858. The Indian Mutiny took place during his tenure. The following year he was raised to the peerage as Baron Lyveden, of Lyveden in the County of Northampton, and in 1879 he was appointed a Knight Grand Cross of the Order of the Bath (GCB).

In 1845 he was appointed one of the Lay Commissioners in Lunacy.

== Family ==
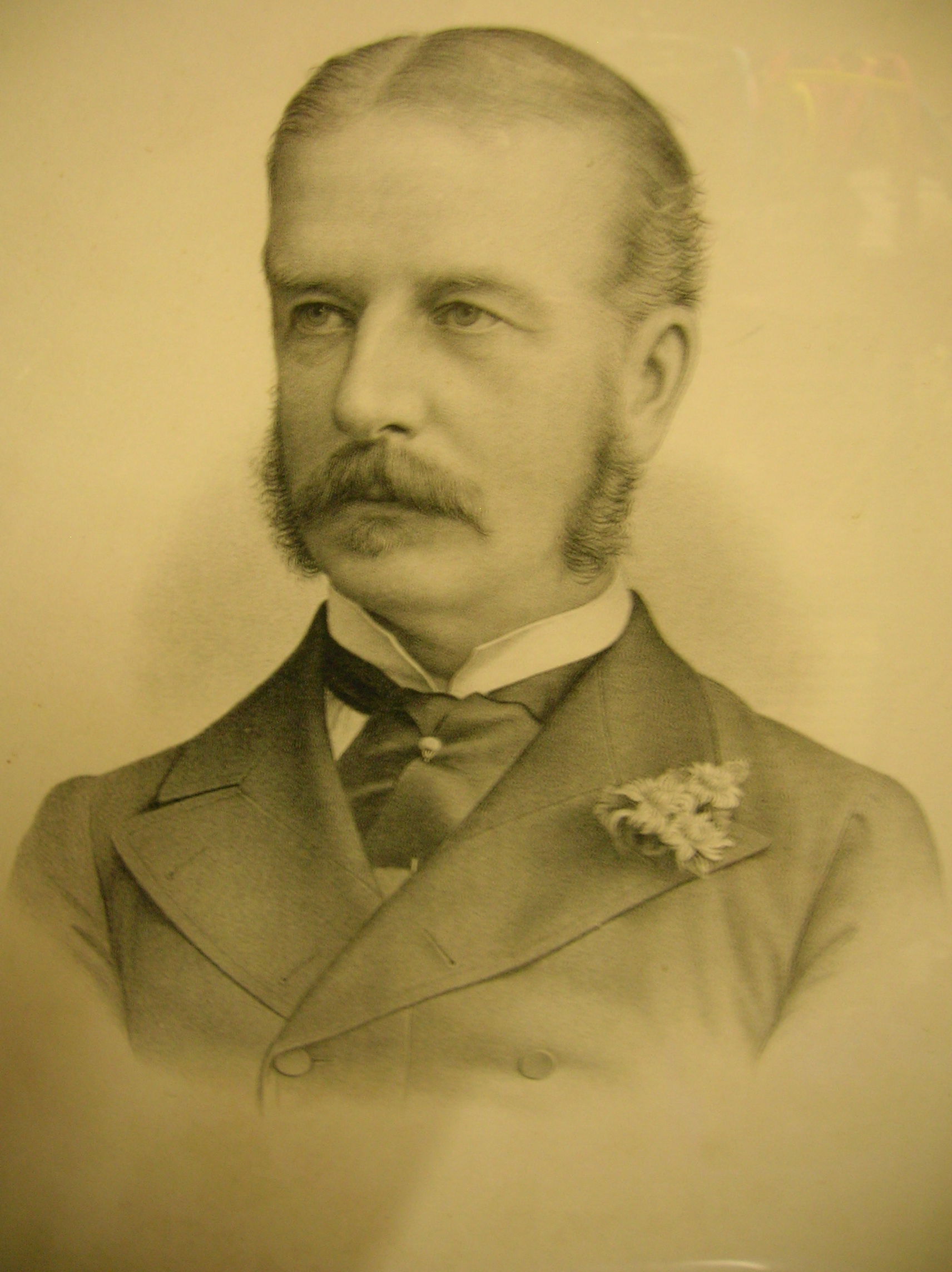
Greville Richard Vernon, son of Lord Lyveden.

Lord Lyveden married Emma Mary Fitzpatrick, the illegitimate daughter of John FitzPatrick, 2nd Earl of Upper Ossory, in 1823. John FitzPatrick, 1st Baron Castletown was her brother.

In 1846 he assumed for his children by Royal licence the surname of Vernon in lieu of Smith and in 1859 he assumed for himself by Royal licence the same surname in lieu of Smith. Lord Lyveden died in November 1873, aged 73, and was succeeded in the barony by his son Fitzpatrick. Lord Lyveden was a member of the Reform Club, the Travellers Club, and Brooks's.

He tomb is located in the church of St Andrew in Brigstock, Northamptonshire.

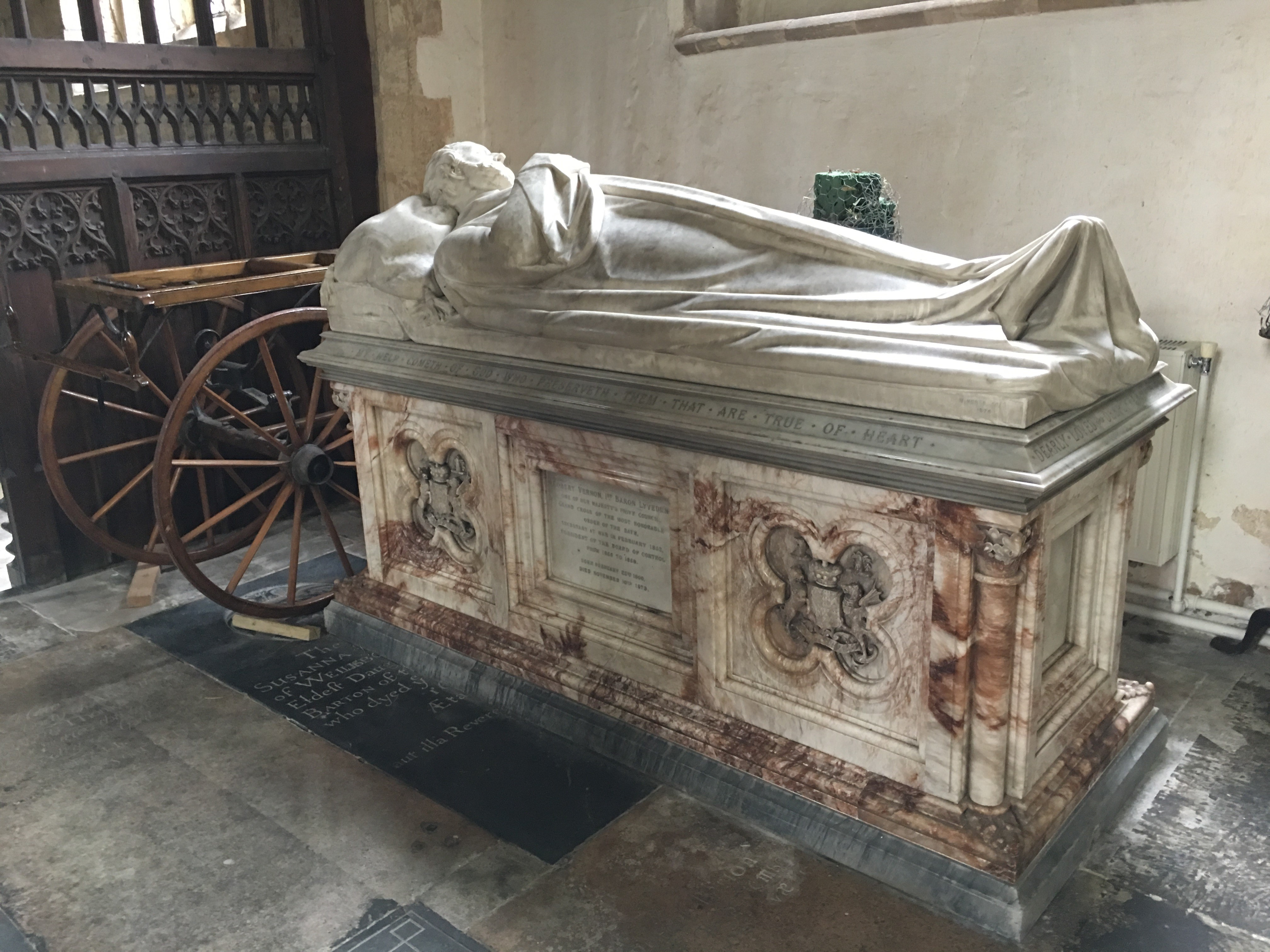
Tomb of Robert Vernon, 1st Baron Lyveden in St. Andrew's church, Brigstock, Northamptonshire

== Notes ==
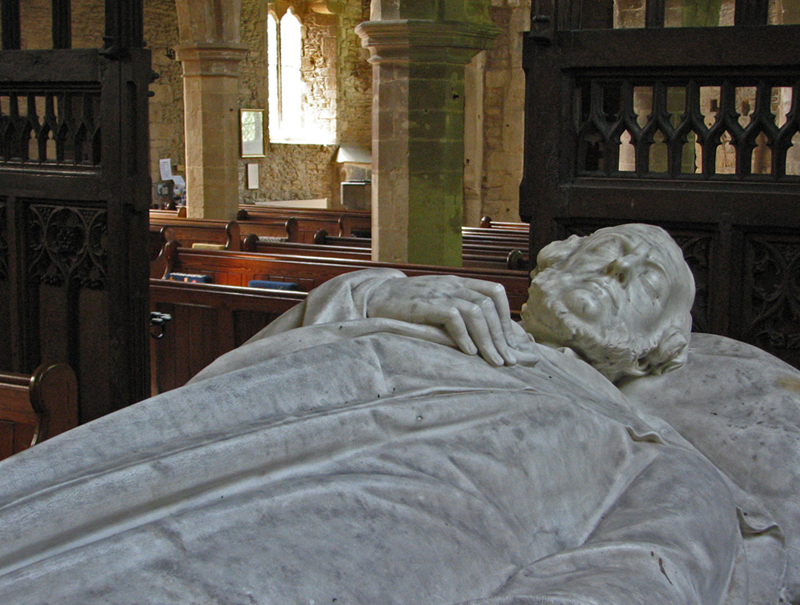
Vernon's tomb in Brigstock

Parliament of the United Kingdom
Preceded by Sir Edward Denny, Bt	Member of Parliament for Tralee; 1829–1831	Succeeded by Walker Ferrand
Preceded by Sir Robert Henry Gunning, Bt; Sir George Robinson, Bt	Member of Parliament for Northampton; 1831–1859; With: Sir George Robinson, Bt to 1832; Charles Ross 1832–37; Raikes Currie 1837–57; Charles Gilpin from 1857	Succeeded by The Lord Henley; Charles Gilpin
Political offices
Preceded by Henry Labouchere	Under-Secretary of State for War and the Colonies; 1839–1841	Succeeded by George William Hope
Preceded by Hon. Fox Maule	Secretary at War; 1852	Succeeded by William Beresford
Preceded by Sir Charles Wood, Bt	President of the Board of Control; 1855–1858	Succeeded by The Earl of Ellenborough
Peerage of the United Kingdom
New creation	Baron Lyveden; 1859–1873	Succeeded by Fitzpatrick Henry Vernon
