= Henry Petty-Fitzmaurice, 3rd Marquess of Lansdowne =

British politician (1780–1863)

The Most Honourable The Marquess of Lansdowne KG PC FRS
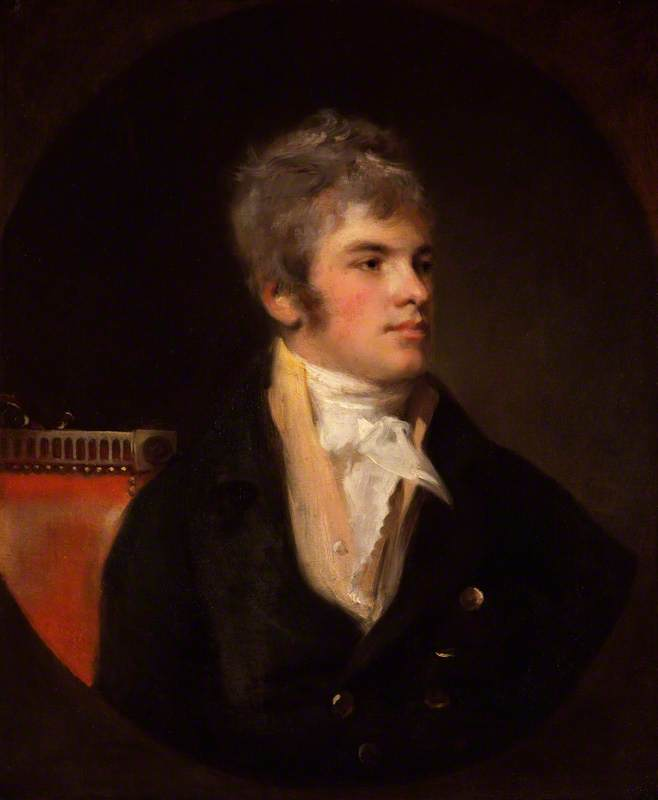
- Portrait by Henry Walton, c. 1805

Leader of the House of Lords
- In office 6 July 1846 – 27 February 1852
- Monarch: Victoria
- Prime Minister: Lord John Russell
- Preceded by: The Duke of Wellington
- Succeeded by: The Earl of Derby

Lord President of the Council
- In office 6 July 1846 – 27 February 1852
- Monarch: Victoria
- Prime Minister: Lord John Russell
- Preceded by: The Duke of Buccleuch
- Succeeded by: The Earl of Lonsdale
- In office 23 April 1835 – 3 September 1841
- Monarchs: William IV; Victoria
- Prime Minister: The Viscount Melbourne
- Preceded by: The Earl of Rosslyn
- Succeeded by: The Lord Wharncliffe
- In office 22 November 1830 – 14 November 1834
- Monarch: William IV
- Prime Minister: The Earl Grey; The Viscount Melbourne
- Preceded by: The Earl Bathurst
- Succeeded by: The Earl of Rosslyn

Secretary of State for the Home Department
- In office 16 July 1827 – 22 January 1828
- Monarch: George IV
- Prime Minister: The Viscount Goderich
- Preceded by: William Sturges Bourne
- Succeeded by: Robert Peel

Chancellor of the Exchequer
- In office 5 February 1806 – 26 March 1807
- Monarch: George III
- Prime Minister: The Lord Grenville
- Preceded by: William Pitt the Younger
- Succeeded by: Spencer Perceval

Member of the House of Lords Lord Temporal
- In office 16 November 1809 – 31 January 1863; Hereditary Peerage
- Preceded by: The 2nd Marquess of Lansdowne
- Succeeded by: The 4th Marquess of Lansdowne

Member of Parliament for Cambridge University
- In office 15 December 1806 – 27 April 1807
- Preceded by: William Pitt the Younger
- Succeeded by: Vicary Gibbs

Member of Parliament for Calne
- In office 31 August 1802 – 24 October 1806
- Preceded by: Sir Francis Baring, Bt
- Succeeded by: Osborne Markham

Personal details
- Born: 2 July 1780 Lansdowne House, Mayfair, Middlesex, England
- Died: 31 January 1863 (aged 82) Bowood House, Derry Hill, Wiltshire, England
- Party: Whig
- Spouse(s): Lady Louisa Fox-Strangways (1785–1851)
- Children: William; Louisa; Henry
- Parents: William Petty, 1st Marquess of Lansdowne; Lady Louisa FitzPatrick
- Education: University of Edinburgh; Trinity College, Cambridge

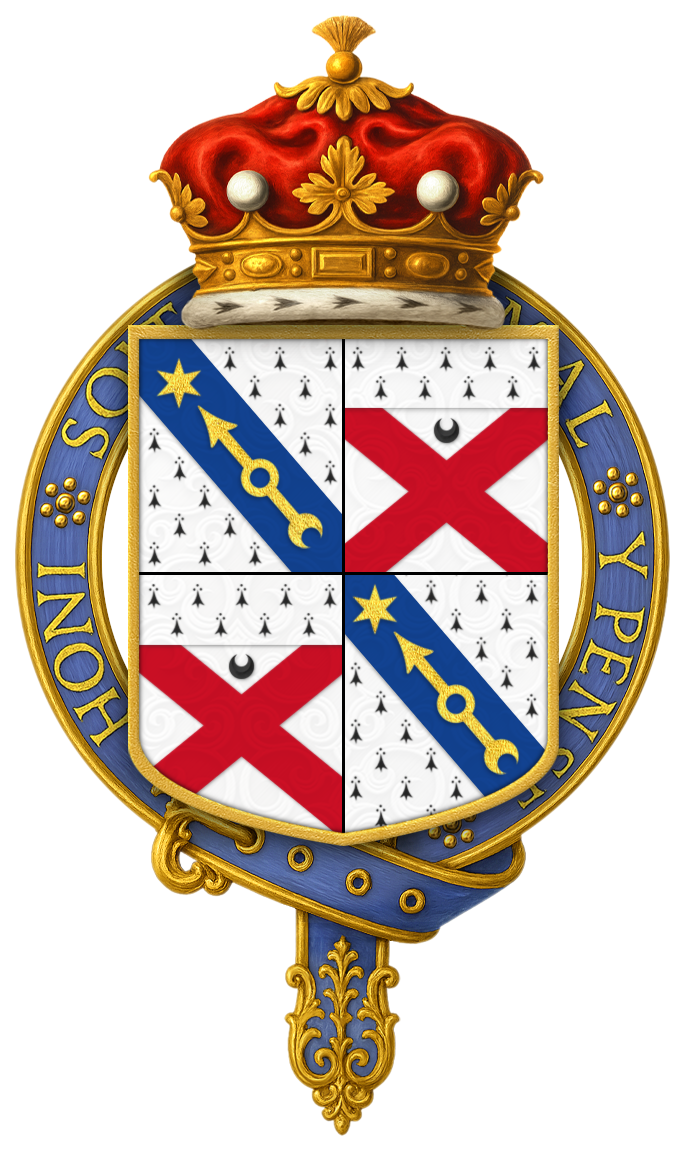
Quartered arms of Henry Petty-Fitzmaurice, 3rd Marquess of Lansdowne, KG, PC, FRS

Henry Petty-Fitzmaurice, 3rd Marquess of Lansdowne (2 July 1780 – 31 January 1863), known as Lord Henry Petty from 1784 to 1809, was a British statesman. In a ministerial career spanning nearly half a century, he notably served as Home Secretary and Chancellor of the Exchequer and was three times Lord President of the Council, serving in every Whig or Liberal Ministry from 1806 to 1863.

== Background and education ==
Lansdowne was the son of Prime Minister William Petty, 1st Marquess of Lansdowne (better known as the Earl of Shelburne), by his second marriage to Lady Louisa, daughter of John FitzPatrick, 1st Earl of Upper Ossory. He was educated at Westminster School, the University of Edinburgh, and Trinity College, Cambridge.

== Political career ==
He entered the House of Commons in 1802 as member for the family borough of Calne and quickly showed his mettle as a politician. In February 1806 he became Chancellor of the Exchequer in Lord Grenville's Ministry of All the Talents, being at this time member for the University of Cambridge, but he lost both his seat and his office in 1807.

In 1809 he became the 3rd Marquess of Lansdowne, succeeding his politically disaffected elder half-brother, John Petty, in the title. The 2nd Marquess, had been obliged to leave Ireland, where the family had estates, after intelligence reports had implicated him in the United-Irish conspiracy of Robert Emmet. On the death of their father, the 1st Marquess had married his mistress by whom he had had no children.

In the House of Lords and in society the third marquess continued to play an active part as one of the Whig leaders. His chief interest was perhaps in the question of Roman Catholic emancipation, a cause which he consistently championed, but he sympathised also with the advocates of the abolition of the slave trade and with the cause of popular education. Lansdowne, who had succeeded his cousin, Francis Thomas Fitzmaurice, as 4th Earl of Kerry in 1818, took office with George Canning in May 1827 and was Secretary of State for the Home Department (Home Secretary) from July of that year until January 1828.

He was Lord President of the Council under Earl Grey and then under Lord Melbourne from November 1830 to August 1841, with the exception of the few months in 1835 when Sir Robert Peel was prime minister. He held the same office during the whole of Lord John Russell's ministry (1846–1852), and, having declined to become prime minister, sat in the cabinets of Lord Aberdeen and of Lord Palmerston, but without office. In 1857 he refused the offer of a dukedom. Punch (October 1857 p. 144) approved of his refusal, writing: "Lord Lansdowne won't be Duke of Kerry. Lord Lansdowne is a wise man, very. Punch drinks his health in port and sherry".

In his later years Lansdowne was known as "the Nestor of the Whigs" (after the wise old king of Greek mythology). His social influence and political moderation made him one of the most powerful Whig statesmen of the time; he was frequently consulted by Queen Victoria on matters of moment, and his long official experience made his counsel invaluable to his party. He died on 31 January 1863.

In Kenmare, he donated the site of the Holy Cross Church to the town. In 1864, Father John O'Sullivan (1806–1874) built the church on that site.

== Other public appointments ==
Lansdowne chaired the inaugural meeting of the London Statistical Society, and was its first president (1834–1836). He later served a second term (1842–1844). (See The Times 15 and 17 March 1834, and John Bibby (1987) HOTS: History of Teaching Statistics.)

== Family ==
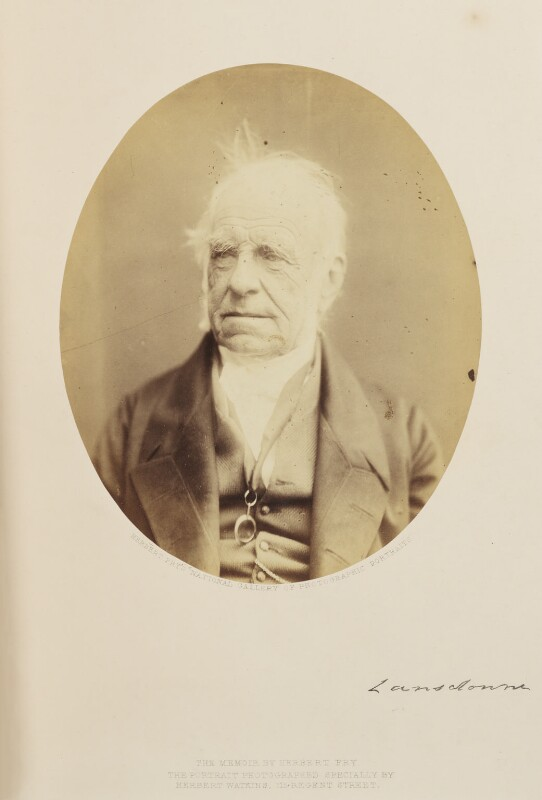
Photograph of Henry Petty-Fitzmaurice, 3rd Marquess of Lansdowne, c. 1857

Lord Lansdowne married Lady Louisa Fox-Strangways, daughter of the 2nd Earl of Ilchester, in 1808. They had two sons and one daughter:

- William Thomas Petty-FitzMaurice, Earl of Kerry (30 March 1811 – 21 August 1836)
- Lady Louisa (1813 – 12 June 1906) married Hon. James Kenneth Howard, son of Thomas Howard, 16th Earl of Suffolk. They had a son Kenneth (married Lady Emily Bury, daughter of the Earl of Charleville) and daughter Winifrede.
- Henry Petty-FitzMaurice, 4th Marquess of Lansdowne (7 January 1816 – 5 July 1866).

Louisa died in April 1851, aged 65, and Lord Lansdowne in January 1863, aged 82. His eldest son, the Earl of Kerry, had predeceased him and he was succeeded in the marquessate by his only surviving son, Henry. The latter was the father of Henry Petty-FitzMaurice, 5th Marquess of Lansdowne, who also became a distinguished statesman. The elderly 3rd Marquess had a close relationship with his grandson, the future 5th Marquess.

== Arms ==
Coat of arms of Henry Petty-Fitzmaurice, 3rd Marquess of Lansdowne
Coronet A Coronet of a Marquess Crest 1st, a beehive beset with bees, diversely volant, proper; 2nd, a centaur drawing a bow and arrow, proper, the part from the waist argent. Escutcheon Quarterly : 1st and 4th Ermine, on a bend, azure a magnetic needle pointing at a polar star, or, (Petty); 2nd and 3rd Argent, a saltier, gules, a chief, ermine (Fitzmaurice). Supporters Two pegasi, ermine.; bridled, crined, winged, and unguled, or, each charged on the shoulder with a fienr-de-lis, azure. Motto Virtute non verbis (By courage, not words). Orders The Most Noble Order of the Garter - Knight Companion (KG).

== Books ==
- Kerry, Simon. Lansdowne: The Last Great Whig (2018), ISBN 9781910787953, OCLC 1043014305, scholarly biography of his grandson the 5th Marquess. Online review (Wall Street Journal).

Parliament of the United Kingdom
Preceded by Joseph Jekyll; Francis Baring, Bt	Member of Parliament for Calne; 1802 – 1806; With: Joseph Jekyll	Succeeded by Joseph Jekyll; Osborne Markham
Preceded by William Pitt the Younger; Earl of Euston	Member of Parliament for Cambridge University; 1806 – 1807; With: Earl of Euston	Succeeded by Earl of Euston; Sir Vicary Gibbs
Preceded by Robert Adair; Viscount Maitland	Member of Parliament for Camelford; 1807–1809; With: Robert Adair	Succeeded by Robert Adair; Henry Brougham
Political offices
Preceded by William Pitt the Younger	Chancellor of the Exchequer; 1806–1807	Succeeded by Spencer Perceval
Preceded by William Sturges Bourne	Home Secretary; 1827–1828	Succeeded by Sir Robert Peel, Bt
Preceded by The Earl Bathurst	Lord President of the Council; 1830–1834	Succeeded by The Earl of Rosslyn
Preceded by The Earl of Rosslyn	Lord President of the Council; 1835–1841	Succeeded by The Lord Wharncliffe
Preceded by The Duke of Buccleuch and Queensberry	Lord President of the Council; 1846–1852	Succeeded by The Earl of Lonsdale
Preceded by The Duke of Wellington	Leader of the House of Lords; 1846–1852	Succeeded by The Earl of Derby
Party political offices
Preceded by The Viscount Melbourne	Leader of the Whigs in the House of Lords; 1842–1855	Succeeded by The Earl Granville
Preceded by The Viscount Melbourne	Leader of the British Whig Party; 1842 – 1846 – with Lord John Russell	Succeeded by Lord John Russell
Peerage of Great Britain
Preceded by John Petty	Marquess of Lansdowne; 1809–1863	Succeeded by Henry Petty-Fitzmaurice
Peerage of Ireland
Preceded by Francis Thomas-Fitzmaurice	Earl of Kerry; 1818–1863	Succeeded by Henry Petty-Fitzmaurice
Academic offices
Preceded by Thomas Campbell	Rector of the University of Glasgow; 1829–1831	Succeeded by Henry Thomas Cockburn
Honorary titles
Preceded by The Earl of Pembroke	Lord Lieutenant of Wiltshire; 1827–1863	Succeeded by The Marquess of Ailesbury
Preceded by The Duke of Cumberland and Teviotdale	Senior Privy Counsellor; 1851–1863	Succeeded by The Viscount Palmerston
