= Gawron =

Gawron is a surname. It means "rook" (Corvus frugilegus) in Polish. Notable people with the name include:

- Andrzej Gawron (born 1965), Polish politician, entrepreneur and local official
- Marcin Gawron (born 1988), Polish tennis player
- Paweł Gawron (1921–1983), Polish gymnast

== See also ==
- Gowran (disambiguation)
- Gowron, a Star Trek character
