= HMS St Albans (1687) =

Ship of the line of the Royal Navy

History

England
- Name: HMS St Albans
- Namesake: Charles Beauclerk, 1st Duke of St Albans
- Ordered: 29 April 1682
- Builder: John Shish (to his death in October 1686), then Fisher Harding, Deptford Dockyard
- Launched: June 1687
- Commissioned: 22 October 1688
- Fate: Wrecked at Kinsale on 8 December 1693

General characteristics
- Class & type: 50-gun fourth rate ship of the line
- Tons burthen: 61511/94 bm
- Length: 128 ft 4 in (39.1 m) (gundeck), 107 ft 0 in (32.6 m) (keel)
- Beam: 32 ft 10.5 in (10.0 m)
- Depth of hold: 13 ft 3 in (4.0 m)
- Propulsion: Sails
- Sail plan: Full-rigged ship
- Complement: 280 in war, 185 in peacetime
- Armament: 50 guns of various weights of shot

HMS St Albans was a 50-gun fourth rate ship of the line of the English Royal Navy, launched at Deptford Dockyard in 1687. One of only three 50-gun ships to be built during James II's brief reign (all three completed with an unusual "square tuck" stern), she was first commissioned on 22 October 1688 under Captain William Constable, and joined Lord Dartmouth's fleet in that month. The ship fought in the Battle of Bantry Bay on 1 May 1689 (under Captain John Layton), at the capture of a French 36-gun ship on 18 July 1690 off Rame Head and in the Battle of Barfleur on 24 May 1692 (under Captain Richard FitzPatrick) and in the Battle of Placentia, Newfoundland on 16–21 September 1693 (under Captain Thomas Gillam).

== Armament ==
All three ships ordered in 1682 (all were launched in 1687) were intended to carry 54 guns each - twenty-two 24-pounders on the lower deck, the same number of demi-culverins (9-pounders) on the upper deck, and ten demi-culverin drakes on the quarterdeck. However, each was completed with just 50 guns in wartime service and 44 guns in peacetime.

== Loss ==
The St Albans was wrecked at Sandy Cove, by Kinsale Harbour on 8 December 1693, after her cables parted during a gale; Captain Gillam drowned.
