= Earl of Upper Ossory =

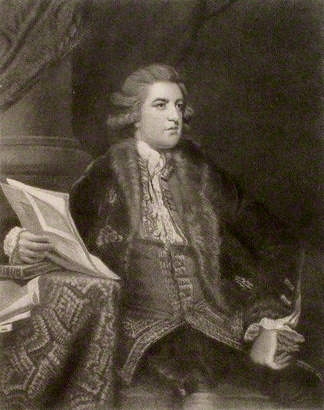
John FitzPatrick, 2nd Earl of Upper Ossory.

Earl of Upper Ossory was a title in the Peerage of Ireland. It was created on 5 October 1751 for John FitzPatrick, 2nd Baron Gowran, who later represented Bedfordshire in the House of Commons. He was the son of Richard FitzPatrick, who had been created Baron Gowran on 27 April 1715, also in the Peerage of Ireland. Lord Gowran had represented Harristown and Queen's County in the Irish House of Commons before his elevation to the peerage. The first Earl's son, the second Earl, also sat as Member of Parliament for Bedfordshire and was Lord Lieutenant of Bedfordshire. In 1794, he was created Baron Upper Ossory, of Ampthill in the County of Bedford, in the Peerage of Great Britain. However, all three titles became extinct on his death in 1818.

The Honourable Richard FitzPatrick, younger son of the first Earl, was a soldier and politician. John FitzPatrick, son of the second Earl, was created Baron Castletown in 1869.

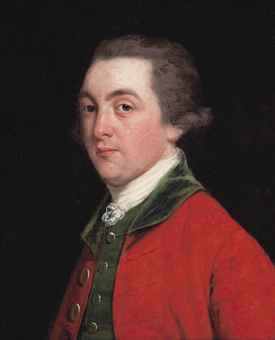
Portrait of John FitzPatrick, 2nd Earl of Upper Ossory (1745–1818) by Thomas Beach (1738-1806).

Not to be confused with the title of Earl of Ossory.

== Barons Gowran (1715) ==
- Richard FitzPatrick, 1st Baron Gowran (c. 1662–1727)
- John FitzPatrick, 2nd Baron Gowran (1719–1758) (created Earl of Upper Ossory in 1751)

== Earls of Upper Ossory (1751) ==
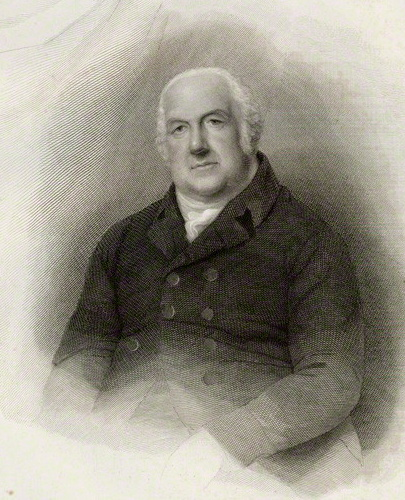
Portrait of John FitzPatrick, 2nd Earl of Upper Ossory.

- John FitzPatrick, 1st Earl of Upper Ossory (1719–1758)
- John FitzPatrick, 2nd Earl of Upper Ossory (1745–1818)

== See also ==
- Baron Castletown
- Earl of Gowran
- Baron Upper Ossory
- John Cutts, 1st Baron Cutts of Gowran
- Kingdom of Osraige
