= Baron Lyveden =

Barony in the Peerage of the United Kingdom

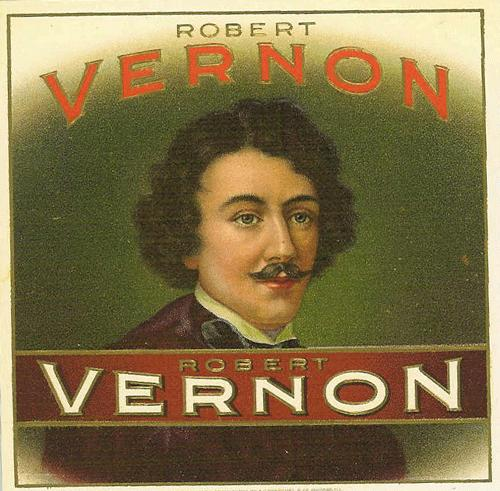
Portrait of Robert Vernon Smith.

Baron Lyveden, of Lyveden in the County of Northampton, is a title in the Peerage of the United Kingdom. It was created in 1859 for the Liberal politician Robert Vernon. Before 1859 he was known as Robert Vernon Smith. He was succeeded by his eldest son, the second Baron. When he died the title passed to his nephew, the third Baron. He was the son of Reverend the Hon. Courtenay John Vernon, third son of first Baron. On the death of his son, the fourth Baron, in 1969, this line of the family failed. The late Baron was succeeded by his second cousin, the fifth Baron. He was the grandson of the Hon. Greville Richard Vernon youngest son of the first Baron. As of 2018 the title is held by his great-grandson, the eighth Baron, who succeeded his father in 2017. Lord Lyveden lives in New Zealand.

Robert Percy Smith, father of the first Baron, was also a politician. Robert Percy's brother was the celebrated writer and priest Sydney Smith.

== Barons Lyveden (1859) ==
- Robert Vernon, 1st Baron Lyveden (1800–1873)
- Fitzpatrick Henry Vernon, 2nd Baron Lyveden (1824–1900)
- Courtenay Robert Percy Vernon, 3rd Baron Lyveden (1857–1926)
- Robert Fitzpatrick Courtenay Vernon, 4th Baron Lyveden (1892–1969)
- Sidney Munro Vernon, 5th Baron Lyveden (1888–1973)
- Ronald Cecil Vernon, 6th Baron Lyveden (1915–1999)
- Jack Leslie Vernon, 7th Baron Lyveden (1938–2017)
- Colin Ronald Vernon, 8th Baron Lyveden (b. 1967)

The heir presumptive is the present holder's uncle Hon. Robert Howard Vernon (b. 1942)
The heir presumptive's heir apparent is his son Russell Sydney Vernon (b. 1969)
The heir presumptive's heir apparent's heir apparent is his son Mitchell Robert Allan Vernon (b. 1998)
