= Richard FitzPatrick =

British Army general (1748–1813)

General The Right Honourable Richard FitzPatrick
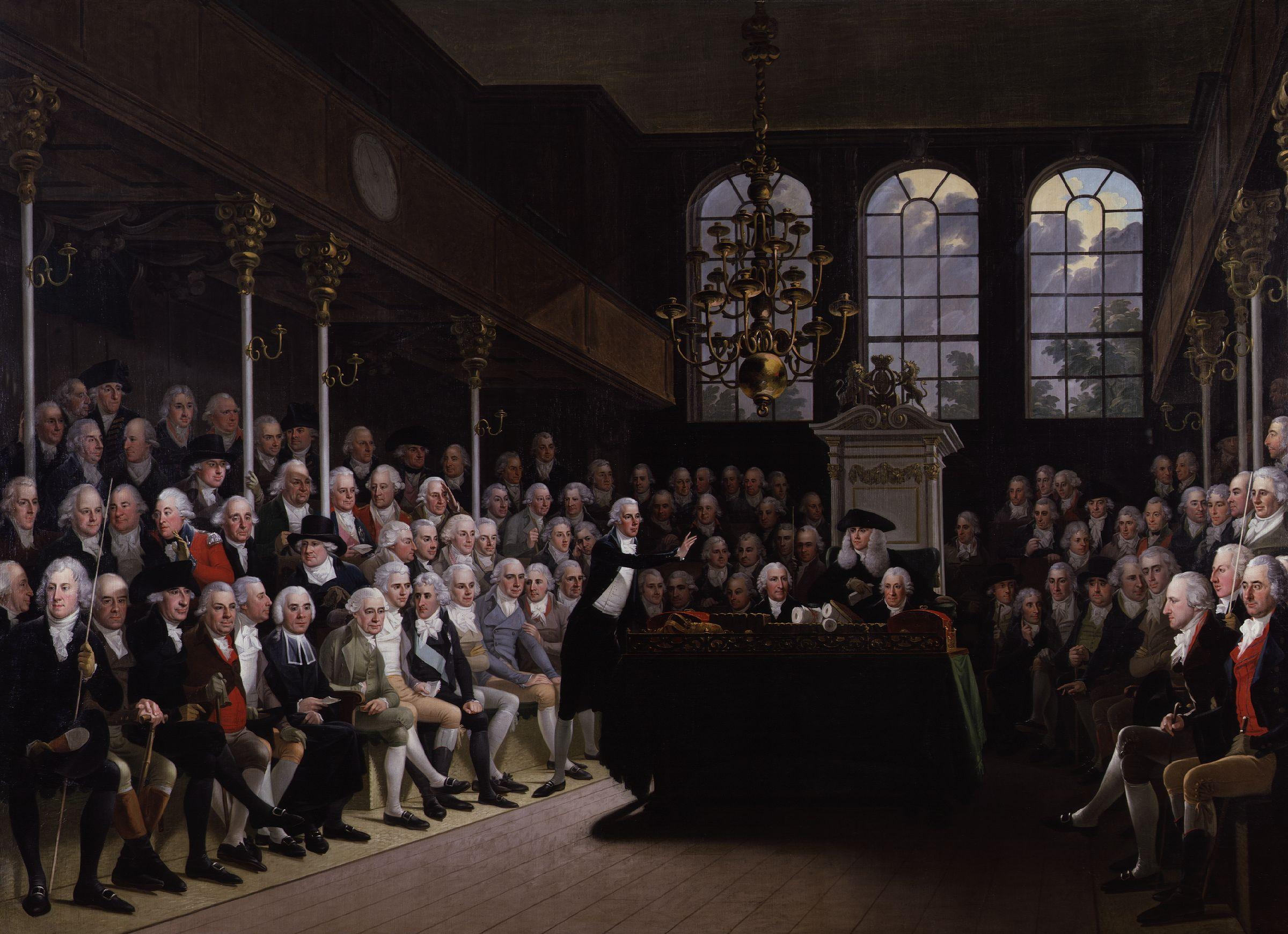
- FitzPatrick is one of many politicians featured in Anton Hickel's The House of Commons, 1793–94

Chief Secretary for Ireland
- In office 1782–1782
- Monarch: George III
- Preceded by: William Eden
- Succeeded by: William Grenville

Secretary at War
- In office 1783–1783
- Monarch: George III
- Prime Minister: The Duke of Portland
- Preceded by: Sir George Yonge, Bt
- Succeeded by: Sir George Yonge, Bt
- In office 1806–1807
- Monarch: George III
- Prime Minister: The Lord Grenville
- Preceded by: William Dundas
- Succeeded by: Sir James Murray-Pulteney, Bt

Personal details
- Born: 24 January 1748 Gowran, Kilkenny, Ireland
- Died: 25 April 1813 (aged 65) Arlington Street, London, England
- Resting place: St Michael & All Angels, Sunninghill, Windsor
- Party: Whig
- Education: Eton

General Richard FitzPatrick (24 January 1748 – 25 April 1813), styled The Honourable from birth, was an Anglo-Irish soldier, wit, poet, and Whig politician. He sat in the British House of Commons for 39 years from 1774 to 1813 and was a "sworn brother" of the statesman Charles James Fox. He served in the Philadelphia campaign during the American Revolutionary War.

== Family and childhood ==
FitzPatrick was a younger son of John FitzPatrick, 1st Earl of Upper Ossory, and Lady Evelyn, daughter of John Leveson-Gower, 1st Earl Gower. He had an elder brother, John FitzPatrick, 2nd Earl of Upper Ossory, and two sisters: Mary, who later married Charles James Fox's brother Stephen Fox, 2nd Baron Holland, and Louisa, who became the second wife of Fox's Whig adversary William Petty, 2nd Earl of Shelburne.

After the death of her husband in 1758, Fitzpatrick's mother brought her children to England and soon remarried Richard Vernon, an original member of the Jockey Club. Lady Evelyn bore her second husband three daughters: Henrietta, who married George Greville, 2nd Earl of Warwick; Caroline Maria, who married Robert Percy Smith, brother of writer Sydney Smith, and Elizabeth, who remained single as the companion of her niece, Caroline Fox. Lady Evelyn died in 1763, leaving Fitzpatrick and his sisters each £100 in trust.

After the death of their mother, the children were cared for by her sister, Gertrude Russell, Duchess of Bedford. Richard Fitzpatrick was educated at Eton, where he met Charles James Fox, a lifelong friend. It may have been through the influence of another aunt's husband, General Waldegrave, that Fitzpatrick began an army career, enlisting in 1765 as an ensign in the First Foot Guards.

== Military career ==
In 1772, Fitzpatrick was gazetted lieutenant and captain. Despite his opposition to the American War, he did not resign his commission when his regiment was ordered to New York in the winter of 1777. Instead he went to America, where he fought in the Battle of Brandywine and the Battle of Germantown. Shortly thereafter, he was promoted to captain and lieutenant colonel. Later that year he returned to England, where he attended to his sister Lady Holland during her fatal illness. With first-hand experience of the war, he returned to Parliament to oppose it. Though he does not appear to have seen active military service after that, Fitzpatrick was promoted to major general in 1793, lieutenant general in 1798 and general in 1803. During the fleeting Rockingham administration of 1783 and again as part of the Ministry of All the Talents in 1806, Fitzpatrick served as Secretary at War. He was colonel of the 47th (Lancashire) Regiment of Foot from 1807 to his death.

== Political career ==
In 1770, Fitzpatrick became Member of Parliament for Okehampton, where he served until 1774, when he was elected in Tavistock, a constituency controlled by his cousin, Francis Russell, 5th Duke of Bedford. He would serve as a Member of Parliament for more than forty years. When Charles James Fox broke with the Tory government and began to oppose Lord North's handling of the American colonies, he persuaded Fitzpatrick and Lord Ossory to join him. They formed the nucleus of a Foxite Whig faction that was to spend most of its time in opposition.

Though a noted wit, Fitzpatrick was not a gifted orator like his friend Fox. His few Parliamentary speeches pertained to military matters, including one in 1789 urging the Pitt government to use its influence with Austria to have the Marquis de Lafayette released. During the brief Rockingham administration, Fitzpatrick served as Chief Secretary for Ireland. In 1806, when the Foxites again took power, Fitzpatrick was awarded the cabinet post of Secretary at War.

== Writer ==
In addition to his military and political careers, Fitzpatrick was also a poet. His first work, published anonymously in 1768 was a parody on Thomas Gray's "Eton College Ode" entitled "Ode on a Distant Prospect of Almack's Assembly Rooms". This was followed in 1772 by "The Bath Picture, or a Slight Sketch of its Beauties". In 1774, his friend Horace Walpole printed Fitzpatrick's "Dorinda, a Town Eclogue" on his private press at Strawberry Hill. Three years later, at the request of Richard Brinsley Sheridan, Fitzpatrick wrote a Prologue for The Critic.

In 1784–1785 Fitzpatrick turned his pen to political satire, collaborating with a number of Whig allies to produce Criticisms on the Rolliad, which satirised several members of the Pitt government. In later years he contributed Verses Inscribed in The Temple of Friendship at St. Anne's Hill, home of Charles Fox and Elizabeth Armistead. After his friend's death, Fitzpatrick penned a quatrain, which was inscribed on a bust of Fox sculpted by Joseph Nollekens:

A patriot's even course he steered,
'Mid faction's wildest storms unmoved;
By all who marked his mind revered,
By all who knew his heart beloved.

An obituary of FitzPatrick declared: "As a poet, Fitzpatrick is deserving of considerable praise. The smoothness of his verse and the justness of his conceptions are greatly to be admired. Thousands have feasted on his poetry, in total ignorance of its author. As he was a politician without ambition, he was a poet without vanity."

== Endowments ==
Nathaniel Wraxall wrote of Fitzpatrick, "His person, tall, manly, and extremely distinguished; set off by his manners, which, though lofty and assuming, were nevertheless elegant and prepossessing; – these endowments added grace to the attractions of his conversation. No man's society was more eagerly courted among the highest Orders, by persons of both sexes." Horace Walpole described Fitzpatrick as "an agreeable young man of parts", and mentioned his "genteel irony and badinage". Richard Tickell wrote: "Oft shall Fitzpatrick's wit and Stanhope's ease / and Burgoyne's manly sense unite to please."

From 1773 to 1791, Richard Fitzpatrick lived at 19 Norfolk Street (now Dunraven), off Park Lane in London. During that time, he and Fox, like many of their contemporaries, gambled ruinously. They frequented the pro-Whig club Almack's, which later became Brooks's, where thousands of pounds could be lost or won in a single night. Of that time, Samuel Rogers wrote, "Lord Tankerville assured me that he has played cards with Fitzpatrick at Brooks's from ten o'clock at night till near six o'clock the next afternoon, a waiter standing by to tell them 'whose deal it was', they being too sleepy to know." When they had exhausted their own resources, of which Fox's were much greater than Fitzpatrick's, they borrowed from friends or moneylenders. Creditors once stopped Fitzpatrick's coach in the middle of a London street and took his horses as repayment.

Fitzpatrick never married, but like others of his set he had numerous love affairs, beginning with Lady Caroline Carpenter, youngest daughter of the Earl of Tyrconnel, who later married his friend Uvedale Price. He appears to have had a taste for married women of the Whig persuasion. Lady Anne Foley, daughter of the Earl of Coventry, was said to have sent him the following note after giving birth: "Dear Richard, I give you joy. I have just made you the father of a beautiful boy.... P.S. This is not a circular."

== Later years ==
In 1791, perhaps inspired by his friend Fox's delight in rural life, Fitzpatrick purchased Beech Grove in Sunninghill near Windsor. The dissolute lifestyle of his early years began to tell on his constitution. He suffered from gout and in the autumn of 1806 underwent an operation to remove a "carbuncle" on his breast. In 1808 he was reported to be "more shattered by age and infirmities than ever".

Financial problems from years of gambling were eased in December 1810, when his old friend the Duke of Queensberry left him a bequest of £1,000 and £500 per annum in recognition of his fine manners. He did not have long to enjoy his windfall. In 1813, Lord Byron saw him in London and later wrote, "I had seen poor Fitzpatrick not very long before — a man of pleasure, wit, eloquence, all things. He tottered — but still talked like a gentleman, though feebly."

On 24 April that year, Samuel Rogers saw Mrs Fox emerge from the doorway of Fitzpatrick's London house on Arlington Street "sobbing violently", and deduced that the General had not long to live. Fitzpatrick died the following day and was buried very near his country house at St Michael and All Angels, Sunninghill. The epitaph on his tomb declared him, by his own wish, "for more than forty years the friend of Mr. Fox."

His nephew Lord Holland wrote of Fitzpatrick: "He was, I think, the most agreeable man I ever conversed with. One or two of his contemporaries might vie with him in wit and exceed him perhaps in some mental endowments, certainly in knowledge and learning; but none united with an equal portion of such qualifications his evenness of temper and spirits, his polished manners, pure taste, sound judgement, and worldly experience."

Despite his many accomplishments, Fitzpatrick's self-assessment was more modest. Part of the poetic epitaph he composed for himself runs:

Through life he walk'd, unemulous of fame,
Nor wished beyond it to preserve a name;
Content, if friendship o'er his humble bier,
Dropt but the heartfelt tribute of a tear;

Parliament of Great Britain
| Preceded by Richard Rigby; Richard Aldworth | Member of Parliament for Tavistock; 1774–1801; With: Richard Rigby 1774–1788; Lord John Russell 1788–1790, 1790–1801; Vacant 1790 | Succeeded by Parliament of the United Kingdom |
Parliament of Ireland
| Preceded by John Tydd; Sir John Parnell, Bt | Member of Parliament for Maryborough; 1782–1783; With: John Tydd | Succeeded by Sir John Parnell, 2nd Bt; Charles Coote |
Parliament of the United Kingdom
| Preceded by Parliament of Great Britain | Member of Parliament for Tavistock; 1801–1807; With: Lord John Russell 1801–1802; Lord Robert Spencer 1802–1807; Lord William Russell 1807 | Succeeded by Lord William Russell; Viscount Howick |
| Preceded by John Osborn; Francis Pym | Member of Parliament for Bedfordshire; 1807–1812; With: Francis Pym | Succeeded by Francis Pym; The Marquess of Tavistock |
| Preceded by Lord William Russell; George Ponsonby | Member of Parliament for Tavistock; 1812–1813; With: Lord William Russell | Succeeded by Lord William Russell; Lord John Russell |
Military offices
| Preceded by James Grant | Colonel of the 11th (the North Devonshire) Regiment of Foot; 1806–1807 | Succeeded by Sir Charles Asgill |
| Preceded by William Dalrymple | Colonel of the 47th (Lancashire) Regiment of Foot; 1807–1813 | Succeeded by Sir Alexander Hope |
Political offices
| Preceded by William Eden | Chief Secretary for Ireland; 1782 | Succeeded by William Grenville |
| Preceded by Sir George Yonge, Bt | Secretary at War; 1783 | Succeeded by Sir George Yonge, Bt |
| Preceded by William Dundas | Secretary at War; 1806–1807 | Succeeded by Sir James Murray-Pulteney, Bt |
