= John FitzPatrick, 1st Earl of Upper Ossory =

Anglo-Irish nobleman

The Right Honourable The Earl of Upper Ossory

Member of Parliament for Bedfordshire
- In office 1753–1758

Personal details
- Born: 1719
- Died: 23 September 1758 (aged 38–39)
- Spouse: Lady Evelyn Leveson-Gower (m. 1744)
- Children: John, Richard, Mary and Louisa
- Parent: Richard FitzPatrick (father)
- Education: Queen's College, Oxford

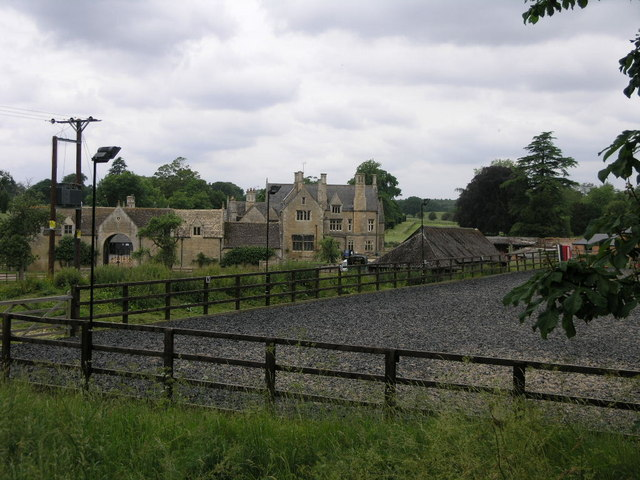
Fermyn Woods Hall

John FitzPatrick, 1st Earl of Upper Ossory (1719 – 23 September 1758), styled Lord Gowran from 1727–51, was an Anglo-Irish nobleman and politician from County Cork, Ireland.

== Biography ==
Fitzpatrick was the son of Richard FitzPatrick, 1st Baron Gowran, and Anne (née Robinson) and was educated at Queen's College, Oxford.

He succeeded his father as 2nd Baron Gowran in 1727 and his mother to the estates of Farmingwoods (now Fermyn Woods), Northamptonshire and Ampthill, Bedfordshire in 1744. He was created Earl of Upper Ossory in the Irish peerage on 5 October 1751. He was MP for Bedfordshire from 1753–8.

He married Lady Evelyn Leveson-Gower, daughter of the 1st Earl Gower, on 29 June 1744. They had four children:

- John FitzPatrick, Lord Gowran, later 2nd Earl of Upper Ossory (1745–1818)
- The Hon. Richard FitzPatrick (24 January 1748 – 25 April 1813)
- The Lady Mary FitzPatrick (bef. 1751 – 6 October 1778), married the 2nd Baron Holland and had issue.
- The Lady Louisa FitzPatrick (1755 – 7 August 1789), married the 2nd Earl of Shelburne (later the 1st Marquess of Lansdowne) and had issue including Henry Petty-Fitzmaurice, 3rd Marquess of Lansdowne.

Parliament of Great Britain
Preceded by Sir Danvers Osborn, Bt; Thomas Alston	Member of Parliament for Bedfordshire; 1753 – 1758; With: Thomas Alston	Succeeded by Thomas Alston; Henry Osborn
Peerage of Ireland
New creation	Earl of Upper Ossory; 1751 – 1758	Succeeded by John FitzPatrick
Preceded by Richard FitzPatrick	Baron Gowran; 1727 – 1758	Succeeded by John FitzPatrick
