= Stephen Fox, 2nd Baron Holland =

British politician and peer

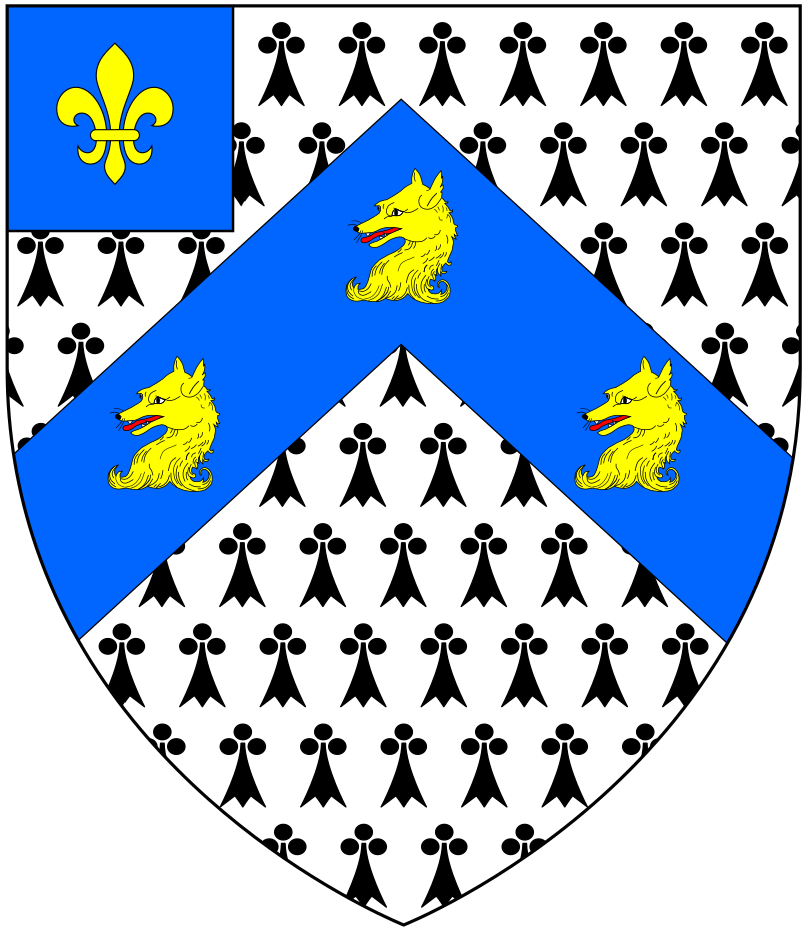
Canting arms of Fox, Baron Holland: Ermine, on a chevron azure three fox's heads and necks erased or on a canton of the second a fleur-de-lys of the third

Stephen Fox, 2nd Baron Holland of Holland and 2nd Baron Holland of Foxley (20 February 1745 – 26 November 1774) of Holland House in Kensington, Middlesex, was a British peer.

== Biography ==
Lord Holland was the eldest son of Henry Fox, 1st Baron Holland of Foxley (1705–1774) of Holland House and his wife Lady Caroline Lennox (1723–1774), suo jure 1st Baroness Holland of Holland, a daughter of Charles Lennox, 2nd Duke of Richmond. Stephen and his younger brother, the great Whig statesman Charles James Fox (1749–1806), were a great trial to their parents because of their gambling and other habits.

He was educated at Eton College.

When his father died on 1 July 1774, Holland inherited his title (Baron Holland of Foxley) and then his mother's title (Baron Holland of Holland) upon her death three weeks later. Holland died just over four months later of dropsy at Red Rice, Hampshire. Both titles were inherited by his 1-year-old son, Henry Vassall-Fox, 3rd Baron Holland of Holland and 3rd Baron Holland of Foxley.

== Marriage and children ==
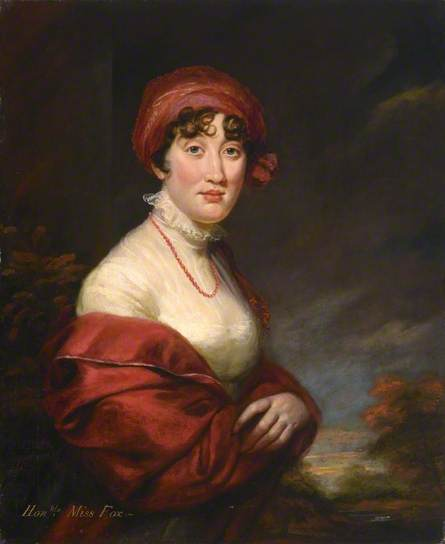
"Hon^{ble} Miss Fox", 1810 portrait by James Northcote (1746–1831) of Hon. Caroline Fox (1767–1845), then aged 43, the only daughter of Stephen Fox, 2nd Baron Holland. Collection of Royal Albert Memorial Museum, Exeter, Devon

On 20 April 1766 he married Lady Mary FitzPatrick, a daughter of John FitzPatrick, 1st Earl of Upper Ossory with whom he had two children:

- Hon Caroline Fox (3 November 1767 – 12 March 1845), of Little Holland House, Kensington, who died unmarried aged 78. In 1842, on a site on her brother's Holland House estate and near her home at Little Holland House, she founded a charity school "for the education of children of the labouring, manufacturing and other poorer classes of Kensington", which survives today, on a new location nearby, as Fox Primary School.
- Henry Vassall-Fox, 3rd Baron Holland of Holland and 3rd Baron Holland of Foxley (1773–1840).

Parliament of Great Britain
Preceded by Hon. Edward Bouverie; Samuel Eyre	Member of Parliament for Salisbury; 1768–1774; With: Hon. Edward Bouverie 1768–1771; Viscount Folkestone 1771–1774	Succeeded by Viscount Folkestone; William Hussey
Peerage of Great Britain
Preceded by Henry Fox	Baron Holland (of Foxley); 1774	Succeeded by Henry Fox
Preceded by Caroline Fox	Baron Holland (of Holland); 1774	Succeeded by Henry Fox
