= Ampthill Park =

Country house in Bedfordshire, England

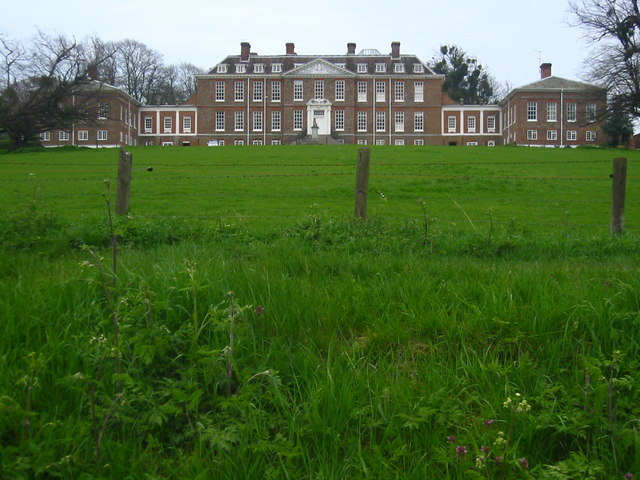
- Ampthill Park House in 2006

- Location within Bedfordshire
- Alternative names: Ampthill Park House

General information
- Location: Ampthill, Bedfordshire, England
- Coordinates: 52.0404°N 0.5045°W
- Ordnance Survey: TL0267039058
- Year built: 1687–89
- Client: Ossory family

Design and construction
- Architect: Robert Grumbold

Listed Building – Grade II*
- Official name: Park House (Cheshire Home for the Disabled), Ampthill Park
- Designated: 17 July 1951
- Reference no.: 1137595

National Register of Historic Parks and Gardens
- Official name: Ampthill Park
- Designated: 30 November 1986
- Reference no.: 1000378

Ampthill Park and Ampthill Park House is a country estate in Ampthill, Bedfordshire, England. The park was opened to the public after the Second World War.

From the 14th century, Ampthill Park was a royal lodge and hunting park. In the 15th century, it was occupied by Sir John Cornwall, who had married the king's sister, Elizabeth of Lancaster, Duchess of Exeter. Sir John amassed a large fortune and constructed Ampthill Castle, a fortified house. After his death Ampthill Park passed to Edmund Grey, 1st Earl of Kent before becoming royal property again. Henry VIII used it for hunting and to hold Katherine of Aragon during the annulment of their marriage. By 1600 the castle was ruinous. Plans made in 1605 to rebuild the palace with parallel lodgings for James VI and I and Anne of Denmark were abandoned. The architect John Thorpe was involved in the project. In 1661 the park was given by Charles II to John Ashburnham, a Royalist supporter.

The present house was built from 1687 to 1689 by architect Robert Grumbold for the Ossory family who held the estate under lease. In the late 1700s, the house was remodelled by Sir William Chambers and the grounds landscaped by Capability Brown.

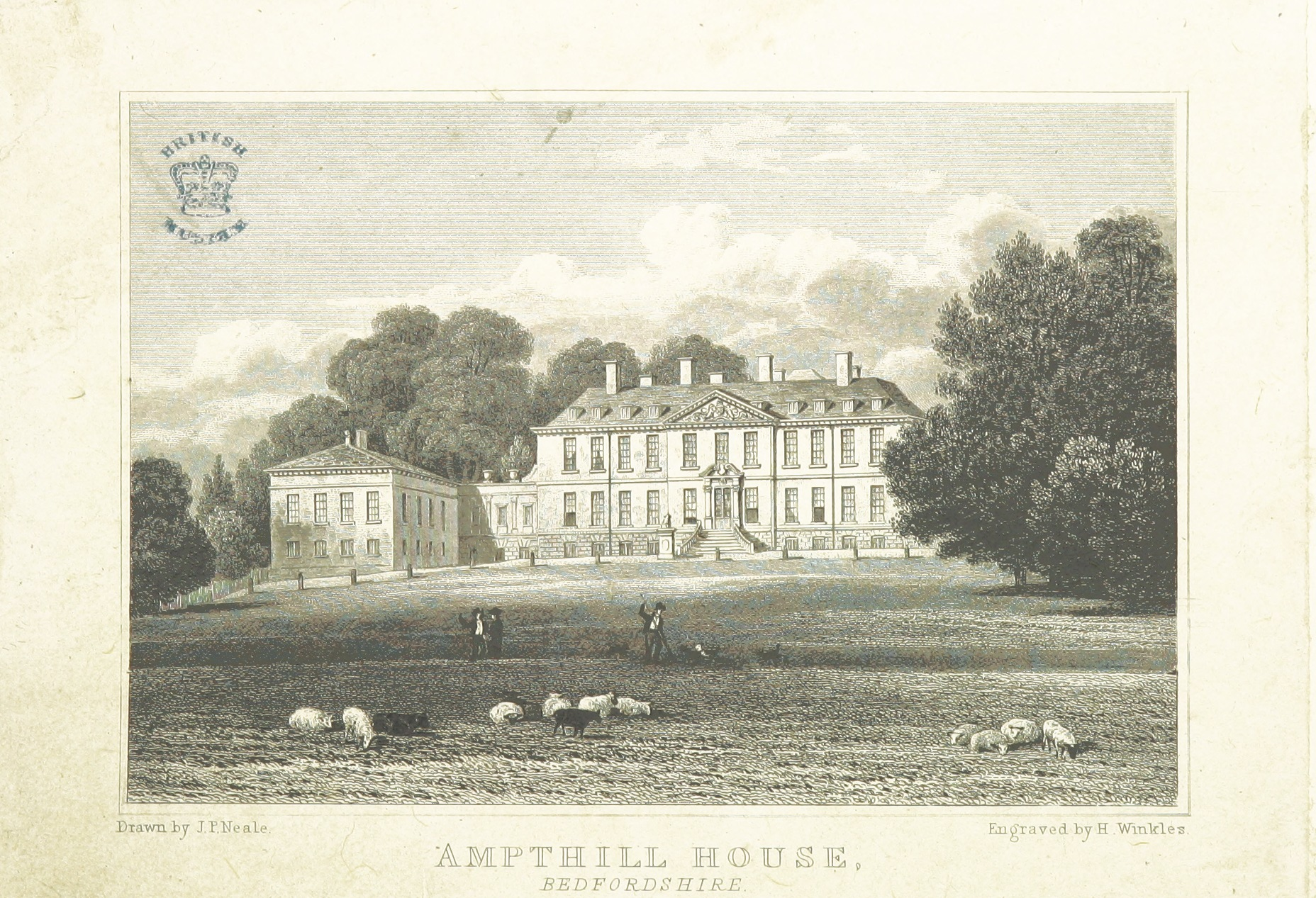
Ampthill Park House in 1818

On the death of Lord Upper Ossory on 13 February 1818, Ampthill Park became the seat of Lord Holland in whose time Holland House in Kensington, London, became famous as a gathering place for intellectuals. It was home to Sir James Parke, Baron Wensleydale, until 1868, and from 1885 was the residence of Lady Ampthill. Notable 20th-century architect Sir Albert Richardson lived in Ampthill from 1919 until his death in 1964.

During World War II the estate was occupied by the army. There was a farming camp near Ampthill, where volunteers recovered sugarbeet and were accommodated in tents in the grounds. After the war it was sold to Bovril Limited, becoming a Cheshire Home for the Disabled in 1955. In 1979 the mansion was rescued from dereliction and divided into four large homes. It is a Grade II* listed building. The park is listed at Grade II.

Ampthill Park was the burial place for the jewelled golden hare in the Kit Williams treasure hunt Masquerade.

Ampthill Park House should not be confused with the former Ampthill House, which was demolished in 1953. The site of Ampthill House 52.031301679473806°N 0.48887789156448314°W was developed for housing along today's Church Avenue in Ampthill town.

== See also ==
- Grade II* listed buildings in Bedfordshire
