= Richard FitzPatrick, 1st Baron Gowran =

Irish-born British naval captain

Captain The Right Honourable The Lord Gowran
- Died: 9 June 1727
- Military career
- Allegiance: Kingdom of Great Britain
- Branch: Royal Navy
- Commands: HMS Richmond; HMS Assurance; HMS Lark; HMS St Albans; HMS Burford; HMS Ranelagh
- Conflicts: War of the Spanish Succession: Battle of Cádiz; Battle of Vigo Bay

Richard FitzPatrick, 1st Baron Gowran (died 9 June 1727) was a British naval captain.

== Life ==
He was the second son of John Fitzpatrick of Castletown, Queen's County, by Elizabeth, fourth daughter of Thomas Butler, Viscount Thurles, and relict of James Purcell of Loughmoe.

He entered the Royal Navy and was appointed, on 14 May 1687 commander of HMS Richmond. On 24 May 1688, he was made captain of HMS Assurance, from which in 1689 he was transferred to HMS Lark, in which he cruised against the French in the North Sea. Having distinguished himself on that station, he was advanced on 11 January 1690 to the command of HMS St Albans, a fourth rate, with which on 18 July he captured off Rame Head a French frigate of 36 guns, after a fight of four hours, in which the enemy lost forty men killed and wounded, the casualties on board St Albans being only four; and the French ship was so shattered that she had to be towed into Plymouth.

In February 1690–1, he drove on shore two French frigates and helped to cut out fourteen merchantmen from a convoy of twenty-two. In command of the 70-gun HMS Burford, he served under Lord Berkeley in 1696, and in July was detached to make a descent on the Groix, an island near Belle Île, off the west coast of Brittany, from which he brought off thirteen hundred head of cattle, with horses, boats, and small vessels. He was promoted to the command of the 80-gun HMS Ranelagh on the outbreak of the War of the Spanish Succession, and took part in James Butler, 2nd Duke of Ormonde's mismanaged expedition against Cadiz in 1702, and in the successful attack on Vigo which followed; but soon after retired from the service.

In 1696, he had received a grant of the town and lands of Grantstown and other lands in Queen's County by King William III in consideration of their faithful services, and entered the Irish House of Commons in 1713 as the member for Queen's County until he was raised to the Irish peerage on 27 April 1715 as Baron Gowran of Gowran, Kilkenny. He took his seat on 12 November, and on 14 November helped to prepare an address to the king congratulating him upon his accession. He died on 9 June 1727.

== Family ==
Fitzpatrick married in 1718 Anne, younger daughter of Sir John Robinson of Farmingwood, Northamptonshire, by whom he had two sons, John and Richard. The widowed Lady Gowran lived with her son John in Grosvenor Square. John was later promoted to the Irish earldom of Upper Ossory on 5 October 1751, and was father of Richard Fitzpatrick.

== Notes ==
Peerage of Ireland
New creation	Baron Gowran; 1715–1727	Succeeded by John FitzPatrick
