= Addington (surname) =

Addington is a surname. Notable people with the surname include:

- Anthony Addington (1713–1790), English physician and writer
- Crandell Addington (1938–2024), American poker player, one of the founders of the World Series of Poker
- David Addington (born 1957), American lawyer, formerly chief of staff to Dick Cheney
- Henry Addington, 1st Viscount Sidmouth (1757–1844), Prime Minister of the United Kingdom from 1801 to 1804
- Henry Unwin Addington (1790–1870), British diplomat and civil servant
- Isaac Addington (1645–1715), functionary of various colonial governments of Massachusetts
- John Hiley Addington (1759–1818), British politician
- Stephen Addington (1729–1796), English dissenting clergyman and teacher
- Steve Addington (born 1964), American NASCAR crew chief
- Tom Addington (1919–2011), British Army soldier
- Tucker Addington (born 1997), American football player
- William Addington, 3rd Viscount Sidmouth (1824–1913), British politician
