= William Addington =

William Addington may refer to:

- William Addington, 3rd Viscount Sidmouth (1824–1913)
- William Addington (judge), see Margaret Nicholson
- William Leonard Addington, 2nd Viscount Sidmouth (1794–1864)

== See also ==
- Addington (surname)
