= Mary Blandy =

English murderer

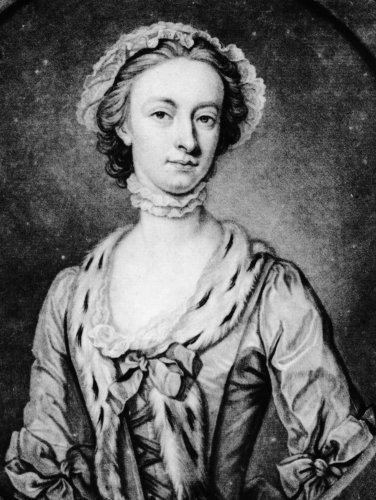
- Blandy in 1751/52
- Born: Mary Blandy c. 1720; Henley, Kingdom of Great Britain
- Criminal penalty: Hanged 6 April 1752 (aged 31-32)

Details
- Locations: Henley, United Kingdom
- Target: Francis Blandy - father
- Killed: 1
- Weapons: Poisoning by arsenic

Mary Blandy (c. 1720 – 6 April 1752) was an eighteenth century British murderer. In 1751, she poisoned her father, Francis Blandy, with arsenic. She claimed that she thought the arsenic was a love potion that would make her father approve of her relationship with William Henry Cranstoun, an army officer and son of a Scottish nobleman.

== Biography ==
Mary's parents raised her to be an intelligent, articulate Anglican woman. Her reputation in Henley, where she lived her entire life, was that of a well-respected, well-mannered, and well-educated young woman. In 1746, Mary met Captain William Henry Cranstoun. The two intended to marry in 1751. However, it was exposed that he was married to a woman in Scotland and had a child by this marriage. Cranstoun denied the validity of this marriage and made several trips to Scotland over the course of his relationship with Mary to have the marriage annulled.

After months of stalling, Mary's father, Francis Blandy, became suspicious of Cranstoun and believed that he did not intend to leave his wife. Mr. Blandy made no attempt to hide his disapproval of Cranstoun's marriage. What happened next is unclear. Mary claimed that Cranstoun sent her a love potion (which later turned out to be arsenic) and asked her to place it in her father's food to make him approve of their relationship. Mary did this, and her father died.

The trial on 3 March 1752 was of some forensic interest, as there was expert testimony about the arsenic poisoning that was presented by Dr. Anthony Addington. Addington had done testing that would be rudimentary by today's standards, but was quite fascinating in the eighteenth century, based on testing residue for traces of arsenic, to such an extent that Dr. Addington's career was made. The doctor eventually became the family doctor to William Pitt, Earl of Chatham. His son was Henry Addington, future Prime Minister and Home Secretary (as Viscount Sidmouth).

On Easter Monday, 6 April 1752, Blandy was hanged outside Oxford Castle prison for the crime of parricide. Her case attracted a great deal of attention from the press. Many pamphlets claiming to be the "genuine account" or the "genuine letters" of Mary Blandy were published in the months following her execution. The reaction among the press was mixed. While some believed her version of the story, most thought that she was lying. The debate over whether or not she was morally culpable for her crime continued for years after her death. In the nineteenth century, her case was re-examined in several texts with a more sympathetic light, and people began to think of her as a "poor lovesick girl".

== In literature ==
The First Forensic Hanging: The Toxic Truth that Killed Mary Blandy, by Summer Strevens (Pen and Sword History, 2018).

A theatrical adaptation, BLANDY, by Coco Cottam (2025) first performed at the Edinburgh Fringe and Theatre503.

Charles Lamb's essay "The Old Benchers of the Inner Temple" includes an anecdote about a local wit's faux pas in referencing the execution of Mary Blandy on the day-of while dining with one of her relatives.
