= Portrait of Henry Addington =

Portrait of Henry Addington may refer to:

- Portrait of Henry Addington (Beechey), a painting by William Beechey
- Portrait of Henry Addington (Copley), a painting by John Singleton Copley
