= James Adams (MP) =

English politician

James Adams (1752–1816), of Berkeley Square, Middlesex, was an English politician.

He was a Member of Parliament (MP) for West Looe 21 August 1784 - 1790, Hindon 1790 to 1796, for Bramber 1796–1802, and for Harwich 7 April 1803 - 1806 and 9 March 1807 - 1807.

His brother is Charles Adams who was also an MP.

Parliament of Great Britain
Preceded by John Lemon; John Scott	Member of Parliament for West Looe; 1784 – 1790; With: John Scott	Succeeded by John Pardoe; Sir John de la Pole, Bt
Preceded by Edward Bearcroft; William Egerton	Member of Parliament for Hindon; 1790 – 1796; With: William Thomas Beckford 1790–95; Thomas Wildman 1795 – Feb 1796; James Wildman Feb – May 1796	Succeeded by James Wildman; Matthew Lewis
Preceded by Sir Henry Gough-Calthorpe; Thomas Coxhead	Member of Parliament for Bramber; 1796 – 1800; With: Charles Rouse-Boughton to 1800; John Henry Newbolt from 1800	Succeeded by Parliament of the United Kingdom
Parliament of the United Kingdom
Preceded by Parliament of Great Britain	Member of Parliament for Bramber; 1801 – 1802; With: John Henry Newbolt	Succeeded by George Manners-Sutton; Henry Jodrell
Preceded by Thomas Myers; John Hiley Addington	Member of Parliament for Harwich; 1803 – 1806; With: John Hiley Addington	Succeeded by John Hiley Addington; William Fremantle
Preceded by John Hiley Addington; William Fremantle	Member of Parliament for Harwich; March 1807 – May 1807; With: John Hiley Addington	Succeeded by John Hiley Addington; William Huskisson
