= John Addington =

John Addington may refer to:

- John Hiley Addington (1759-1818), British politician
- John Tonge Anthony Pellew Addington, 7th Viscount Sidmouth (1914-2005), 7th Viscount Sidmouth
- John Addington (born 1990), heir apparent to title of Viscount Sidmouth after 8th Viscount
