= Spouse of the prime minister of the United Kingdom =

Spouse of the Prime Minister of the United Kingdom
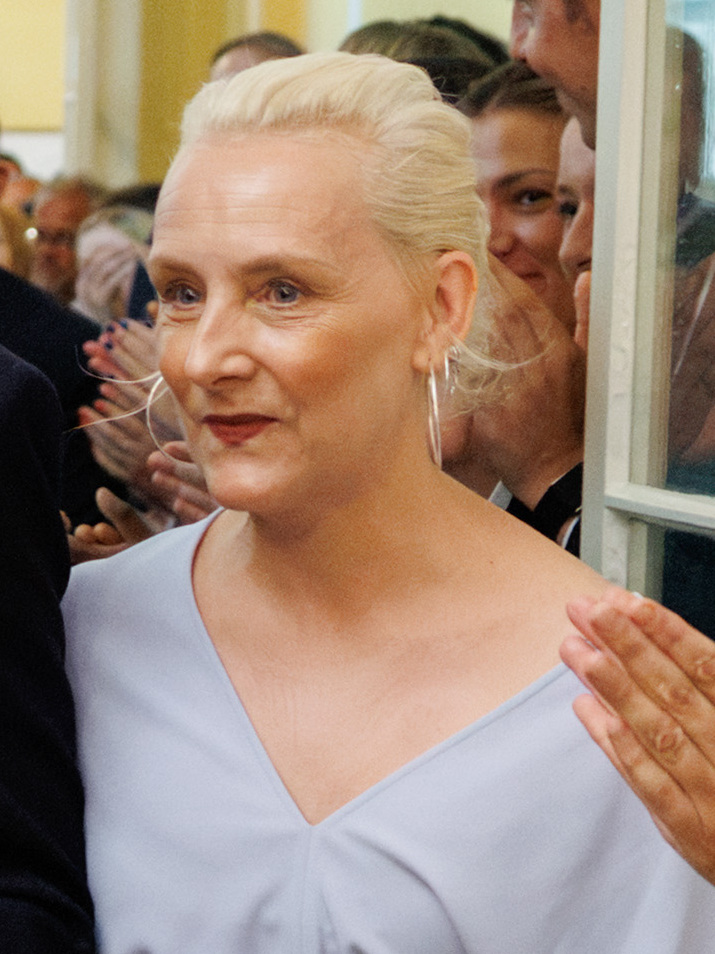
- Current; Marie-France van Heel since 20 July 2026
- Residence: 10 Downing Street (customary)
- Formation: 3 April 1721 (305 years ago)
- First holder: Catherine, Lady Walpole

To date, forty-seven women and three men have been married to a British prime minister in office. There have also been four bachelor and nine widower prime ministers; the last bachelor was Edward Heath (1970–1974) and the last widower was Ramsay MacDonald (1924, 1929–1935). The Duke of Grafton (1768–1770) and Boris Johnson (2019–2022) are the only prime ministers to have divorced and remarried while in office.

The current prime minister, Andy Burnham, has been married to Marie-France van Heel since 2000.

== Role and duties ==
The role of the British prime minister's spouse is not an official one, and as such, they are not given a salary or official duties. Over time the position has evolved, and spouses such as Cherie Blair have gained public attention through their own independent careers and achievements, as well as attending engagements such as the African First Ladies Summit.

Cherie Blair, with Cate Haste, wrote a book about recent prime ministerial spouses, The Goldfish Bowl: Married to the Prime Minister, 1955–1997, in 2005.

== List of spouses ==
Image	Spouse	Date of birth	Date of marriage	Prime Minister	Date tenure began	Age at start of tenure	Date tenure ended	Date of death
Portrait of Catherine Walpole	Catherine Walpole (née Shorter)	1682	30 Jul 1700	Robert Walpole	3 Apr 1721	38–39 years	20 Aug 1737	20 Aug 1737 (aged 54–55)
—	None (widower)	—	—	Robert Walpole	20 Aug 1737	—	3 Mar 1738	—
	Maria Walpole (née Skerrett)	1702	3 Mar 1738	Robert Walpole	3 Mar 1738	35–36 years	4 Jun 1738	4 Jun 1738 (aged 35–36)
—	None (widower)	—	—	Robert Walpole	4 Jun 1738	—	11 Feb 1742	—
—	None (bachelor)	—	—	Earl of Wilmington	16 Feb 1742	—	2 Jul 1743	—
	Lady Catherine Pelham (née Manners)	1706	29 Oct 1726	Henry Pelham	27 Aug 1743	36–37 years	6 Mar 1754	18 Feb 1780 (aged 73–74)
Portrait of Harriet Pelham-Holles	Duchess of Newcastle (Harriet Pelham-Holles, née Godolphin)	1701	2 Apr 1717	Duke of Newcastle	16 Mar 1754	52–53 years	11 Nov 1756	17 Jul 1776 (aged 74–75)
—	None (Note: Devonshire's wife Charlotte died in 1754.) (widower)	—	—	Duke of Devonshire	16 Nov 1756	—	29 Jun 1757	—
Portrait of Harriet Pelham-Holles	Duchess of Newcastle (Harriet Pelham-Holles, née Godolphin)	1701	2 Apr 1717	Duke of Newcastle	29 Jun 1757	55–56 years	26 May 1762	17 Jul 1776 (aged 74–75)
Portrait of Mary Stuart	Countess of Bute (Mary Stuart, née Montagu)	19 Jan 1718	24 Aug 1736	Earl of Bute	26 May 1762	44 years	8 Apr 1763	6 Nov 1794 (aged 76)
	Elizabeth Grenville (Note: Mother of Lord Grenville.) (née Wyndham)	1719	1 May 1749	George Grenville	16 Apr 1763	43–44 years	10 Jul 1765	5 Dec 1769 (aged 49–50)
Portrait of Mary Watson-Wentworth	Marchioness of Rockingham (Mary Watson-Wentworth, née Liddell)	1735	26 Feb 1752	Marquess of Rockingham	13 Jul 1765	29–30 years	30 Jul 1766	19 Dec 1804 (aged 68–69)
Portrait of Hester Pitt	Countess of Chatham (Note: Mother of William Pitt the Younger.) (Hester Pitt, née Grenville)	8 Nov 1720	16 Nov 1754	Earl of Chatham	30 Jul 1766	45 years	14 Oct 1768	9 Apr 1803 (aged 82)
Portrait of Anne FitzRoy	Duchess of Grafton (Anne FitzRoy, née Liddell)	1737	29 Jan 1756	Duke of Grafton	14 Oct 1768	30–31 years	23 Mar 1769	1804 (aged 66–67)
—	None (divorcee)	—	—	Duke of Grafton	23 Mar 1769	—	24 Jun 1769	—
Portrait of Elizabeth FitzRoy	Duchess of Grafton (Note: Grafton's second marriage after Anne Liddell.) (Elizabeth FitzRoy, née Wrottesley)	1 Nov 1745	24 Jun 1769	Duke of Grafton	24 Jun 1769	23 years	28 Jan 1770	25 May 1822 (aged 76)
Portrait of Anne North	Lady North (Anne North, née Speke)	1741	20 May 1756	Lord North	28 Jan 1770	28–29 years	27 Mar 1782	1797 (aged 55–56)
Portrait of Mary Watson-Wentworth	Marchioness of Rockingham (Mary Watson-Wentworth, née Liddell)	1735	26 Feb 1752	Marquess of Rockingham	27 Mar 1782	46–47 years	1 Jul 1782	19 Dec 1804 (aged 68–69)
Portrait of Louisa Petty	Countess of Shelburne (Note: Shelburne's second marriage after Sophia Carteret.) (Louisa Petty, née FitzPatrick)	1755	19 Jul 1779	Earl of Shelburne	4 Jul 1782	26–27 years	26 Mar 1783	7 Aug 1789 (aged 33–34)
Portrait of Dorothy Bentinck	Duchess of Portland (Note: Daughter of the Duke of Devonshire.) (Dorothy Bentinck, née Cavendish)	27 Aug 1750	8 Nov 1766	Duke of Portland	2 Apr 1783	32 years	18 Dec 1783	3 Jun 1794 (aged 43)
—	None (bachelor)	—	—	William Pitt	19 Dec 1783	—	14 Mar 1801	—
	Ursula Addington (née Hammond)	1759	19 Sep 1781	Henry Addington	17 Mar 1801	41–42 years	10 May 1804	28 Jun 1811 (aged 51–52)
—	None (bachelor)	—	—	William Pitt	10 May 1804	—	23 Jan 1806	—
Portrait of Anne Grenville	Baroness Grenville (Anne Grenville, née Pitt)	Sep 1772	18 Jul 1792	Lord Grenville	11 Feb 1806	33 years	25 Mar 1807	Jun 1864 (aged 91)
—	None (Note: Portland's wife Lady Dorothy died in 1794.) (widower)	—	—	Duke of Portland	31 Mar 1807	—	4 Oct 1809	—
	Jane Perceval (née Wilson)	21 Sep 1769	10 Aug 1790	Spencer Perceval	4 Oct 1809	40 years	11 May 1812	26 Jan 1844 (aged 74)
Portrait of Louisa Jenkinson	Countess of Liverpool (Louisa Jenkinson, née Hervey)	Feb 1767	25 Mar 1795	Earl of Liverpool	8 Jun 1812	45 years	12 Jun 1821	12 Jun 1821 (aged 54)
—	None (widower)	—	—	Earl of Liverpool	12 Jun 1821	—	24 Sep 1822	—
	Countess of Liverpool (Mary Jenkinson, née Chester)	24 Jun 1777	24 Sep 1822	Earl of Liverpool	24 Sep 1822	45 years	9 Apr 1827	18 Oct 1846 (aged 69)
	Joan Canning (née Scott)	1776	8 Jul 1800	George Canning	12 Apr 1827	50–51 years	8 Aug 1827	14 Mar 1837 (aged 60–61)
	Viscountess Goderich (Sarah Robinson, née Hobart)	22 Feb 1793	1 Sep 1814	Viscount Goderich	31 Aug 1827	34 years	8 Jan 1828	9 Apr 1867 (aged 74)
	Duchess of Wellington (Catherine Wellesley, née Pakenham)	14 Jan 1773	10 Apr 1806	Duke of Wellington	22 Jan 1828	55 years	16 Nov 1830	24 Apr 1831 (aged 58)
	Countess Grey (Mary Grey, née Ponsonby)	4 Mar 1776	18 Nov 1794	Earl Grey	22 Nov 1830	54 years	9 Jul 1834	26 Nov 1861 (aged 85)
—	None (Note: Melbourne's wife Lady Caroline died in 1828.) (widower)	—	—	Viscount Melbourne	16 Jul 1834	—	14 Nov 1834	—
—	None (Note: Wellington's wife Catherine died in 1831.) (widower)	—	—	Duke of Wellington	17 Nov 1834	—	9 Dec 1834	—
Portrait of Julia Peel	Julia Peel (née Floyd)	1795	8 Jun 1820	Robert Peel	10 Dec 1834	38–39 years	8 Apr 1835	27 Oct 1859 (aged 63–64)
—	None (widower)	—	—	Viscount Melbourne	18 Apr 1835	—	30 Aug 1841	—
Portrait of Julia Peel	Julia Peel (née Floyd)	1795	8 Jun 1820	Robert Peel	30 Aug 1841	45–46 years	29 Jun 1846	27 Oct 1859 (aged 63–64)
Portrait of Frances Russell	Lady John Russell (Note: Russell's second marriage after Adelaide Lister.) (Frances Russell, née Elliot-Murray-Kynynmound)	15 Nov 1815	20 Jul 1841	Lord John Russell	30 Jun 1846	30 years	21 Feb 1852	17 Jan 1898 (aged 82)
Portrait of Emma Caroline Smith-Stanley	Countess of Derby (Emma Caroline Smith-Stanley, née Bootle-Wilbraham)	17 Mar 1805	31 May 1825	Earl of Derby	23 Feb 1852	46 years	17 Dec 1852	1876 (aged 70–71)
—	None (Note: Aberdeen's first wife Catherine died in 1812 and his second wife Harriet died in 1833.) (widower)	—	—	Earl of Aberdeen	19 Dec 1852	—	30 Jan 1855	—
Portrait of Emily Temple	Viscountess Palmerston (Note: Emily's second marriage after the Earl Cowper. Sister of the Viscount Melbourne.) (Emily Temple, née Lamb)	1787	16 Dec 1839	Viscount Palmerston	6 Feb 1855	67–68 years	19 Feb 1858	1869 (aged 81–82)
Portrait of Emma Caroline Smith-Stanley	Countess of Derby (Emma Caroline Smith-Stanley, née Bootle-Wilbraham)	17 Mar 1805	31 May 1825	Earl of Derby	20 Feb 1858	52 years	11 Jun 1859	1876 (aged 70–71)
Portrait of Emily Temple	Viscountess Palmerston (Emily Temple, née Lamb)	1787	16 Dec 1839	Viscount Palmerston	12 Jun 1859	71–72 years	18 Oct 1865	1869 (aged 81–82)
Portrait of Frances Russell	Countess Russell (Frances Russell, née Elliot-Murray-Kynynmound)	15 Nov 1815	20 Jul 1841	Earl Russell	29 Oct 1865	49 years	26 Jun 1866	17 Jan 1898 (aged 82)
Portrait of Emma Caroline Smith-Stanley	Countess of Derby (Emma Caroline Smith-Stanley, née Bootle-Wilbraham)	17 Mar 1805	31 May 1825	Earl of Derby	28 Jun 1866	61 years	25 Feb 1868	1876 (aged 70–71)
Portrait of Mary Anne Disraeli	Mary Anne Disraeli (Note: Mary's second marriage after Wyndham Lewis.) (née Evans)	11 Nov 1792	28 Aug 1839	Benjamin Disraeli	27 Feb 1868	75 years	1 Dec 1868	15 Dec 1872 (aged 80)
Portrait of Catherine Gladstone	Catherine Gladstone (née Glynne)	6 Jan 1812	25 Jul 1839	William Ewart Gladstone	3 Dec 1868	56 years	17 Feb 1874	14 Jun 1900 (aged 88)
—	None (Note: Disraeli's wife Mary died in 1872.) (widower)	—	—	Benjamin Disraeli	20 Feb 1874	—	21 Apr 1880	—
Portrait of Catherine Gladstone	Catherine Gladstone (née Glynne)	6 Jan 1812	25 Jul 1839	William Ewart Gladstone	23 Apr 1880	68 years	9 Jun 1885	14 Jun 1900 (aged 88)
	Marchioness of Salisbury (Georgina Gascoyne-Cecil, née Alderson)	1827	11 Jul 1857	Marquess of Salisbury	23 Jun 1885	57–58 years	28 Jan 1886	20 Nov 1899 (aged 71–72)
Portrait of Catherine Gladstone	Catherine Gladstone (née Glynne)	6 Jan 1812	25 Jul 1839	William Ewart Gladstone	1 Feb 1886	74 years	20 Jul 1886	14 Jun 1900 (aged 88)
	Marchioness of Salisbury (Georgina Gascoyne-Cecil, née Alderson)	1827	11 Jul 1857	Marquess of Salisbury	25 Jul 1886	58–59 years	11 Aug 1892	20 Nov 1899 (aged 71–72)
Portrait of Catherine Gladstone	Catherine Gladstone (née Glynne)	6 Jan 1812	25 Jul 1839	William Ewart Gladstone	15 Aug 1892	80 years	2 Mar 1894	14 Jun 1900 (aged 88)
—	None (Note: Rosebery's wife Hannah died in 1890.) (widower)	—	—	Earl of Rosebery	5 Mar 1894	—	22 Jun 1895	—
	Marchioness of Salisbury (Georgina Gascoyne-Cecil, née Alderson)	1827	11 Jul 1857	Marquess of Salisbury	25 Jun 1895	67–68 years	20 Nov 1899	20 Nov 1899 (aged 71–72)
—	None (widower)	—	—	Marquess of Salisbury	20 Nov 1899	—	11 Jul 1902	—
—	None (bachelor)	—	—	Arthur Balfour	12 Jul 1902	—	4 Dec 1905	—
Portrait of Charlotte Campbell-Bannerman	Charlotte Campbell-Bannerman (née Bruce)	10 May 1832	13 Sep 1860	Henry Campbell-Bannerman	5 Dec 1905	72–73 years	30 Aug 1906	30 Aug 1906 (aged 73–74)
—	None (widower)	—	—	Henry Campbell-Bannerman	30 Aug 1906	—	5 Apr 1908	—
Portrait of Margot Asquith	Margot Asquith (Note: Asquith's second marriage after Helen Melland.) (née Tennant)	2 Feb 1864	10 May 1894	H. H. Asquith	5 Apr 1908	44 years	5 Dec 1916	28 Jul 1945 (aged 81)
Portrait of Margaret Lloyd George	Margaret Lloyd George (née Owen)	4 Nov 1864	24 Jan 1888	David Lloyd George	6 Dec 1916	52 years	19 Oct 1922	20 Jan 1941 (aged 76)
—	None (Note: Law's wife Annie died in 1909.) (widower)	—	—	Bonar Law	23 Oct 1922	—	20 May 1923	—
Portrait of Lucy Baldwin	Lucy Baldwin (née Ridsdale)	19 Jun 1869	12 Sep 1892	Stanley Baldwin	22 May 1923	53 years	22 Jan 1924	17 Jun 1945 (aged 75)
—	None (Note: MacDonald's wife Margaret died in 1911.) (widower)	—	—	Ramsay MacDonald	22 Jan 1924	—	4 Nov 1924	—
Portrait of Lucy Baldwin	Lucy Baldwin (née Ridsdale)	19 Jun 1869	12 Sep 1892	Stanley Baldwin	4 Nov 1924	55 years	4 Jun 1929	17 Jun 1945 (aged 75)
—	None (widower)	—	—	Ramsay MacDonald	5 Jun 1929	—	7 Jun 1935	—
Portrait of Lucy Baldwin	Lucy Baldwin (née Ridsdale)	19 Jun 1869	12 Sep 1892	Stanley Baldwin	7 Jun 1935	65 years	28 May 1937	17 Jun 1945 (aged 75)
Portrait of Anne Cole	Anne Chamberlain (née Cole)	1 Jun 1882	5 Jan 1911	Neville Chamberlain	28 May 1937	53–54 years	10 May 1940	12 Feb 1967 (aged 83–84)
Portrait of Clementine Churchill	Clementine Churchill (née Hozier)	1 Apr 1885	12 Sep 1908	Winston Churchill	10 May 1940	55 years	26 Jul 1945	12 Dec 1977 (aged 92)
	Violet Attlee (née Millar)	20 Nov 1895	10 Jan 1922	Clement Attlee	26 Jul 1945	49 years	26 Oct 1951	7 Jun 1964 (aged 68)
Portrait of Clementine Churchill	Clementine Churchill (née Hozier)	1 Apr 1885	12 Sep 1908	Winston Churchill	26 Oct 1951	66 years	5 Apr 1955	12 Dec 1977 (aged 92)
	Clarissa Eden (Note: Eden's second marriage after Beatrice Beckett.) (née Spencer-Churchill)	28 Jun 1920	14 Aug 1952	Anthony Eden	6 Apr 1955	34 years	9 Jan 1957	15 Nov 2021 (aged 101)
	Lady Dorothy Macmillan (née Cavendish)	28 Jul 1900	21 Apr 1920	Harold Macmillan	10 Jan 1957	56 years	18 Oct 1963	21 May 1966 (aged 65)
Portrait of Elizabeth Douglas-Home	Elizabeth Douglas-Home (née Alington)	6 Nov 1909	3 Oct 1936	Alec Douglas-Home	19 Oct 1963	53 years	16 Oct 1964	3 Sep 1990 (aged 80)
Portrait of Mary Wilson	Mary Wilson (née Baldwin)	12 Jan 1916	1 Jan 1940	Harold Wilson	16 Oct 1964	48 years	19 Jun 1970	6 Jun 2018 (aged 102)
—	None (bachelor)	—	—	Edward Heath	19 Jun 1970	—	4 Mar 1974	—
Portrait of Mary Wilson	Mary Wilson (née Baldwin)	12 Jan 1916	1 Jan 1940	Harold Wilson	4 Mar 1974	58 years	5 Apr 1976	6 Jun 2018 (aged 102)
Portrait of Audrey Callaghan	Audrey Callaghan (née Moulton)	28 Jul 1915	28 Jul 1938	James Callaghan	5 Apr 1976	60 years	4 May 1979	15 Mar 2005 (aged 89)
Portrait of Denis Thatcher	Denis Thatcher (Note: First male spouse. Denis's second marriage after Margot Kempson.)	10 May 1915	13 Dec 1951	Margaret Thatcher	4 May 1979	63 years	28 Nov 1990	26 Jun 2003 (aged 88)
	Norma Major (née Wagstaff, formerly Johnson)	12 Feb 1942	3 Oct 1970	John Major	28 Nov 1990	48 years	2 May 1997	Living (age 84)
Portrait of Cherie Blair	Cherie Blair (née Booth)	23 Sep 1954	29 Mar 1980	Tony Blair	2 May 1997	42 years	27 Jun 2007	Living (age 71)
Portrait of Sarah Brown	Sarah Brown (née Macaulay)	31 Oct 1963	3 Aug 2000	Gordon Brown	27 Jun 2007	43 years	11 May 2010	Living (age 62)
Portrait of Samantha Cameron	Samantha Cameron (née Sheffield)	18 Apr 1971	1 Jun 1996	David Cameron	11 May 2010	39 years	13 Jul 2016	Living (age 55)
Portrait of Philip May	Philip May	18 Sep 1957	6 Sep 1980	Theresa May	13 Jul 2016	58 years	24 Jul 2019	Living (age 68)
	Marina Wheeler (separated) (Note: Johnson's second marriage after Allegra Mostyn-Owen.) (Note: Wheeler was never in any official role as spouse of the prime minister as she and Johnson separated and began divorce proceedings in 2018. Their divorce was finalised by November 2020.)	18 Aug 1964	8 May 1993	Boris Johnson	24 Jul 2019	54 years	2020	Living (age 62)
—	None (divorcee)	—	—	Boris Johnson	2020	—	29 May 2021	—
Portrait of Carrie Johnson	Carrie Johnson (née Symonds)	17 Mar 1988	29 May 2021	Boris Johnson	29 May 2021	33 years	6 Sep 2022	Living (age 38)
Portrait of Hugh O'Leary	Hugh O'Leary	19 Jul 1974	2000	Liz Truss	6 Sep 2022	48 years	25 Oct 2022	Living (age 52)
Portrait of Akshata Murty	Akshata Murty	25 Apr 1980	2009	Rishi Sunak	25 Oct 2022	42 years	5 Jul 2024	Living (age 46)
Portrait of Victoria Starmer	Victoria Starmer (née Alexander)	1973/1974	6 May 2007	Keir Starmer	5 Jul 2024	50 years	20 Jul 2026	Living (age 52–53)
Portrait of Marie-France van Heel	Marie-France van Heel	Jan 1970	2000	Andy Burnham	20 Jul 2026	56 years	—	Living (age 56)

== See also ==
- List of prime ministers of the United Kingdom
- Spouse of the prime minister of Australia
- Spouse of the prime minister of Canada
- Spouse of the prime minister of New Zealand
