= Ursula Addington =

First wife of Henry Addington, Prime Minister of the United Kingdom

The Right Honourable The Viscountess Sidmouth
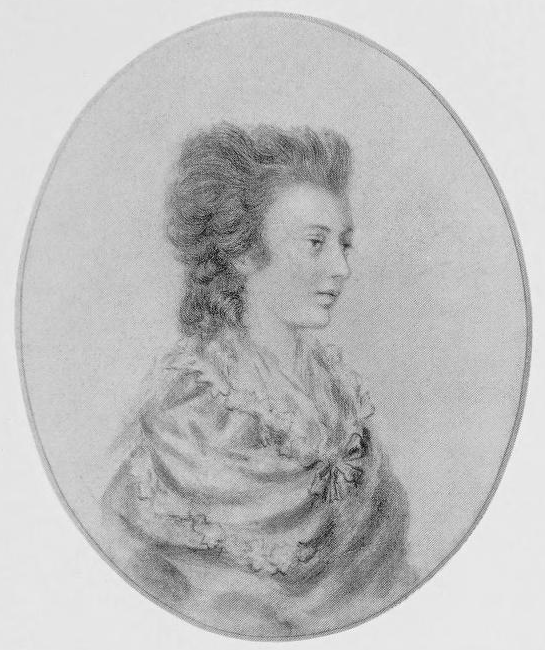
- Sketch of Addington by artist John Downman.
- Born: Ursula Mary Hammond; May 14, 1760; Cheam, London, England
- Died: June 23, 1811 (aged 51); Marylebone, London, England
- Burial place: St Mary the Virgin Churchyard, Mortlake
- Known for: Spouse of the prime minister of the United Kingdom (1801–1804)
- Spouse: Henry Addington (m. 1781)
- Children: 8

Ursula Mary Addington, Viscountess Sidmouth (née Hammond; 14 May 1760 – 23 June 1811) was the wife of Henry Addington, Prime Minister of the United Kingdom between 1801 and 1804.

== Early life ==
Addington was born Ursula Mary Hammond in the London suburb of Cheam. Her father, Leonard Hammond, Esq., was a member of the landed gentry and successful in business. Her grandfather, William Hammond, Esq., had served as Member of Parliament for Southwark between 1743 and 1747.

From Leonard Hammond's estate, Addington brought an annual income of £1,000 a year to her marriage. According to biographer Philip Ziegler, although Ursula received little formal education, she was considered intelligent and inquisitive, taking an interest "in everything and everyone around her."

== Engagement ==
Ursula Hammond met Henry Addington in the summer of 1781 after he took chambers at the Paper Buildings. They quickly developed a mutual romantic interest in one another, and were engaged within weeks. At this time, Ursula's financial position was superior to Henry's, who "had hardly a penny" of his own.

During this period, Henry wrote to his father, Anthony Addington, to share the news of his engagement. Anthony, who was known as a cynic, described his son's announcement of their engagement as "hyperbolic," and asserted that his son's "fever" would "gradually subside." Nonetheless, the couple married on 19 September 1781 to the approval of the Addington and Hammond families.

== Marriage ==
=== Support for Henry and political activities ===
Ursula and Henry had differing personalities. Henry was reticent and described as a dull public speaker, while Ursula was more socially confident and fond of jokes. Nonetheless, the couple were known to be devoted to each other for the duration of their marriage, and Ursula was credited with building Addington's self-confidence. Biographer Mark Hitchens assessed that Ursula was the only person around whom Henry felt "relaxed and at ease."

As an early example of a Member of Parliament from a middle-class background, Henry faced ridicule from his political colleagues for lacking noble heritage. Possessing no heraldry of his own, Henry emblazoned the Speaker's State Coach with Ursula's traditional coat of arms for the Hammond family during his time as Speaker of the House of Commons between 1789 and 1801, which was unusual for a man to do. In his private life, he relied upon Ursula for support, who was said to defend him "ferociously." She was known in London society to "put aside" her gentle temperament if her husband was "the object of attack."

Ursula supported Henry's charitable and political activities. She participated in the Ladies' Committee of the Society for Bettering the Condition of the Poor, established in 1804; Henry also belonged to the organisation.

=== Henry Addington's term as Prime Minister: 1801-1804 ===
Henry Addington became Prime Minister in March 1801, following the resignation of William Pitt the Younger. At this time, Pitt had been Prime Minister for seventeen consecutive years. Pitt, who had resigned after meeting a political impasse with his desire to admit Catholics to Parliament, approved of Henry as his successor; they had known each other since childhood, and Anthony Addington was the physician of Pitt's father. Ursula was "agitated" by her husband's unexpected appointment to the head of government, but took the news "better" than her family expected.

As the first Prime Minister to come from a middle-class background, Henry continued to face ridicule by some of Pitt's aristocratic supporters during his term, including Charles Long and George Canning. After Henry's negotiation of peace with France in March 1802 proved short-lived, Pitt became a vocal critic of Addington's administration. Henry resigned in May 1804, and Pitt returned to office.

Afterwards, Pitt and Addington's personal relationship remained strained until Pitt's death in 1806. Ursula earned a reputation for harbouring greater hostility towards Pitt than Henry. In September 1804, King George III expressed a belief to George Rose that Ursula was far more resentful of Pitt than Henry himself was capable of being.

=== Children ===
Ursula and Henry had four sons and four daughters together in total, of whom five survived infancy. Henry was an attentive father, who was known to interrupt political business to attend to Ursula or their children while they were sick.

Ursula, who experienced intermittent health concerns, suffered at least two miscarriages during their marriage. One son died aged two months; another died after three days. Their eldest son, Henry, experienced symptoms of mental illness while studying at the University of Oxford in March 1805, from which he never fully recovered.

== Later life and death ==
Addington's son-in-law, George Pellew, who married Ursula and Henry's daughter Frances in 1820, would recall Ursula being "meek and retiring" in the later years of her life, and also religious. Her poor health worsened, and began to dramatically decline in the spring of 1811. On 14 April, Henry wrote that she was suffering from poor appetite and "pain in the region of the liver."

Ursula died on 23 June 1811 at her home in Portman Square, attended by Henry. Her death "devastated" Henry, who withdrew into an extended period of mourning and remained a widower for twelve years; he eventually remarried. Both Ursula and Henry are buried at St Mary's Church, Mortlake, which once hosted memorials of the couple.
