= Ardington (surname) =

Ardington is an English toponymic surname. Notable people with the surname include:

- Anthony Ardington (born 1940), South African cricketer
- Mark Ardington (1976–2024), British visual effects artist

== See also ==
- Addington (surname)
