= Victoria Starmer =

Spouse of the British Prime Minister from 2024 to 2026

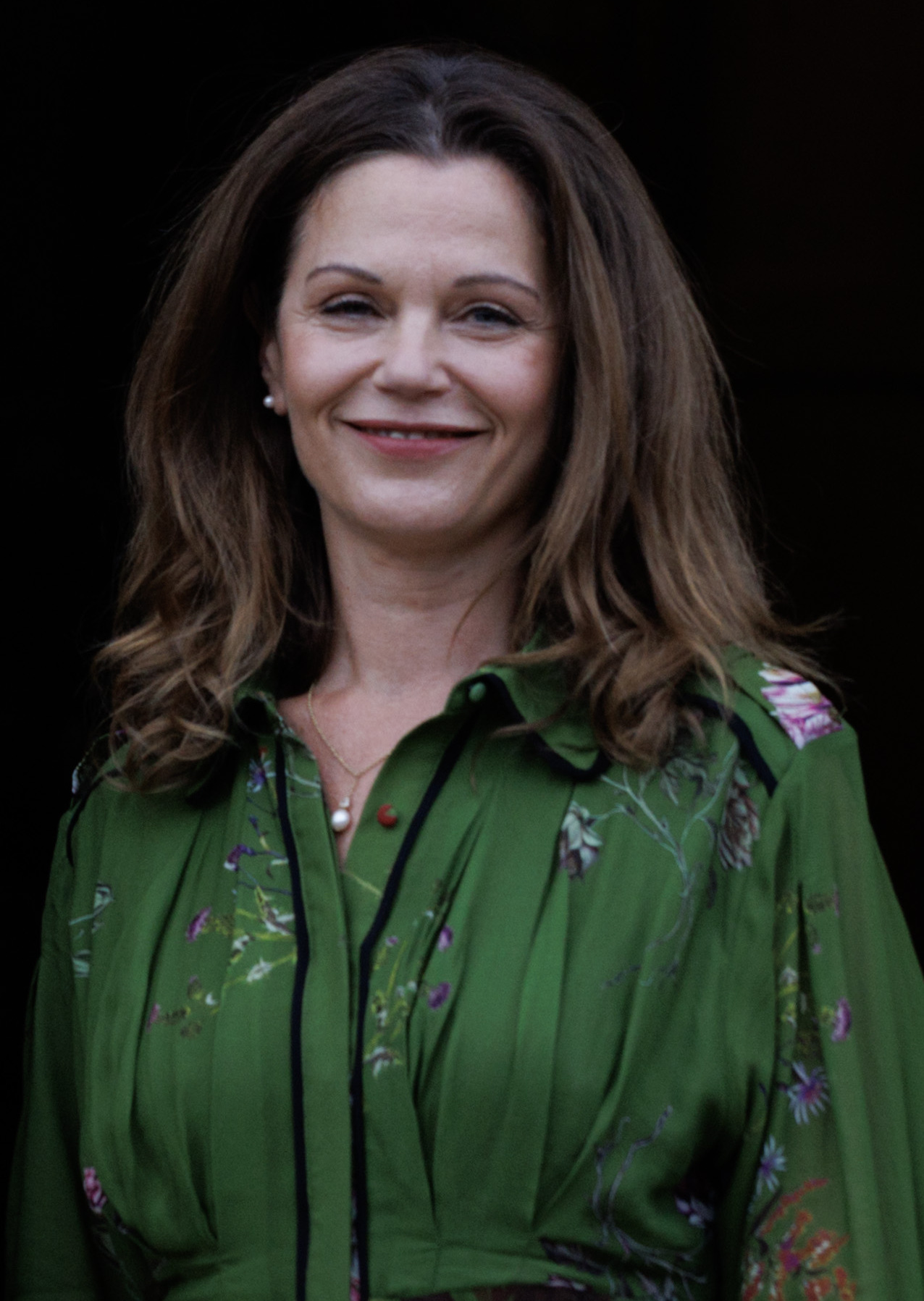
- Starmer in 2025
- Born: Victoria Jane Alexander; 1973 or 1974 (age 52-53); London, England
- Education: Channing School; Cardiff University (LLB)
- Occupations: Solicitor; occupational health practitioner
- Known for: Spouse of the prime minister of the United Kingdom (2024–2026)
- Political party: Labour
- Spouse: Keir Starmer (m. 2007)
- Children: 2

Victoria Jane, Lady Starmer (née Alexander; born 1973 or 1974) is a British occupational health administrator and former solicitor. She is married to Keir Starmer, who served as Prime Minister of the United Kingdom from 2024 to 2026.

Born in London, she studied law and sociology at Cardiff University, where she was president of the student union. She has been a supporter of the Labour Party since at least her student years. She later moved into occupational health, working within the National Health Service (NHS).

Starmer married her husband, Keir Starmer, in 2007. The couple have two children. During her husband's premiership, Starmer kept a relatively low profile, and continued in her role at the NHS.

== Early life and career ==
Victoria Alexander was born in 1973 or 1974 in London. Along with an elder sister, she was brought up in Gospel Oak, London. Her father, Bernard, an economics lecturer and chartered accountant, was born in 1929 to a Polish-Jewish family that emigrated to the United Kingdom prior to the First World War while her mother, Barbara A. Moyes (who died in 2020), was a community doctor in the National Health Service who converted to Judaism upon marriage.

Alexander was educated at Channing School in Highgate, London, and later studied law and sociology from Cardiff University, where she served as president of the student union. At some point after her marriage, she stopped practising law and began working as an occupational health worker for the NHS.

In September 2026, Starmer made her modelling debut for designer Edeline Lee at London Fashion Week.

== Personal life ==
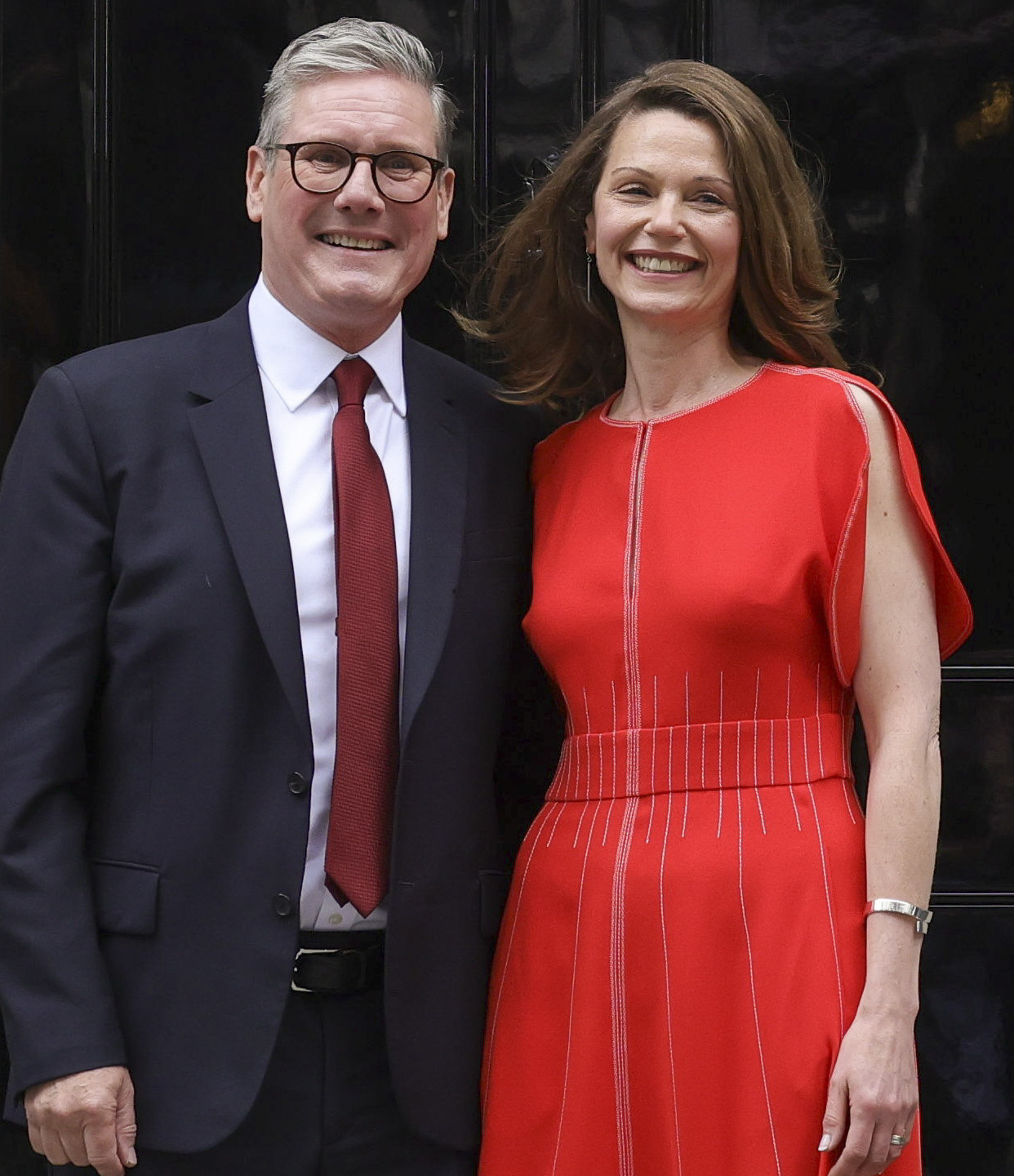
Victoria and Keir Starmer outside 10 Downing Street, after the latter's appointment as prime minister

Alexander met Keir Starmer, then a senior barrister with Doughty Street Chambers, while working on the same case. The pair became engaged in 2004 and married on 6 May 2007 on the Fennes Estate, just north of Bocking, Essex.

The couple have two children: a son (born 2008) and a daughter (born 2010); both are being brought up in their mother's Jewish heritage and culture. The family observe Shabbat and are members of the Liberal Jewish Synagogue in north London.

Starmer is a vegetarian. Until moving to 10 Downing Street, the family resided in Kentish Town, north London.

Starmer has supported the Labour Party since at least her student days, notably protesting against Conservative education reforms as Cardiff University's education and welfare officer in 1993. Despite this, she kept a relatively low profile during the 2024 general election, choosing not to appear on the campaign trail. She did, however, make appearances at Labour events and state banquets which were held during the campaign.

=== Starmer ministry ===
Following Labour's landslide victory in the 2024 general election, Starmer accompanied her husband to Buckingham Palace for his appointment as prime minister by King Charles III, succeeding outgoing Conservative prime minister Rishi Sunak. She subsequently accompanied her husband to 10 Downing Street, where he made his first speech as PM. It was reported that she would continue in her role at the NHS, and was expected to keep a relatively low profile.

The Daily Telegraph reported in September 2024 that Starmer had accepted two free tickets to attend an Eras Tour concert by the American singer Taylor Swift at Wembley Stadium earlier that year. In the same month, her husband faced accusations of breaking parliamentary rules by not declaring £5,000 worth of clothes bought for her by the Labour donor Waheed Alli, Baron Alli. The donations, which included a personal shopper and clothing alterations, were said to have occurred both before and after the general election.

In April 2025, Starmer attended the funeral of Pope Francis in Vatican City alongside her husband.

Before entering politics, Starmer originally questioned why her husband would want to enter politics in the first place, but she later became his closest daily confidante, with Keir openly stating that Victoria's advice was "always the best advice." As his premiership faced mounting pressure following disastrous local election results in the 2026 local elections, Victoria persuaded her husband against stepping down in May, advising him to stay in post, fight on, and resist resigning, despite a wave of ministerial departures. However, after a final weekend spent discussing his political future together at Chequers, and Andy Burnham's return to Parliament, Victoria and Keir mutually decided that he should step down.

Unofficial roles
Preceded by Akshata Murty	Spouse of the Prime Minister of the United Kingdom; 2024–2026	Succeeded by Marie-France van Heel
