= John Hiley Addington =

British politician (1759–1818)

The Right Honourable John Hiley Addington
- Born: August 1759
- Died: 11 June 1818 (aged 58)
- Education: Cheam School; Winchester College; Brasenose College, Oxford
- Spouse: Mary Urwin (m. 1785)
- Children: 3
- Parents: Anthony Addington (father); Mary Addington (mother)
- Relatives: Henry Addington (brother); Henry Unwin Addington (son)

John Hiley Addington (August 1759 – 11 June 1818) was a British Tory party politician. He served as a Member of Parliament for various constituencies between 1787 and 1818.

== Background and education ==
Addington was the second son of Anthony Addington and his wife Mary, daughter of Haviland John Hiley. His older brother was Henry Addington, who served as Prime Minister of the United Kingdom and under whose lifelong influence and patronisation he was. He was educated at Cheam School and then at Winchester College. Addington studied in Ealing until 1776 and afterwards at Brasenose College, Oxford.

== Political career ==
Addington entered the British House of Commons in 1787, having been elected for Truro. He represented the constituency until 1790 and after a break of four years was returned to Parliament for Winchelsea until 1796. In the following general election Addington stood successfully for Wendover. He held that seat until the Act of Union 1801 and then became a member of the newly established Parliament of the United Kingdom. In 1802 Addington won the election for Bossiney, however he resigned his seat the following year. Instead he ran for Harwich in a by-election, which had been triggered by the death of his predecessor. Addington sat for the constituency for the rest of his life.

During his time as Member of Parliament, he was appointed a Lord of the Treasury in December 1800, by the then Prime Minister William Pitt. In March of the following year he became a Secretary to the Treasury until 1802, when on his own request he returned to his former office. Addington was made Paymaster of the Forces in 1803 and on this occasion was sworn of the Privy Council. When in the next year his brother Henry's government failed, he was replaced as Paymaster. In 1806, Addington joined the Board of Control as a commissioner, however left it after a year. He accepted an appointment as Under-Secretary of State for Home Affairs in 1812, retiring after a collapse in 1818.

In 1803 Addington was nominated High Steward of Harwich and lieutenant-colonel of the Mendip Volunteers.

== Family and death ==
In 1785, Addington married Mary, daughter of Henry Unwin. The couple had two sons and a daughter. Addington died at Longford Court in 1818 from complications after an operation on his stomach. He was survived by his wife until 1833. His younger son Henry was a diplomat and civil servant.

The writer Hannah More was a close friend of Addington and his family.

== Notes ==
Parliament of Great Britain
Preceded by William Macarmick; William Augustus Spencer Boscawen	Member of Parliament for Truro; 1787–1790; With: William Augustus Spencer Boscawen	Succeeded by James Gordon; William Augustus Spencer Boscawen
Preceded by Sir Frederick Fletcher-Vane, Bt; Richard Barwell	Member of Parliament for Winchelsea; 1794–1796; With: Richard Barwell	Succeeded by William Currie; Richard Barwell
Preceded by John Barker Church; Lord Hugh Seymour	Member of Parliament for Wendover; 1796–1800; With: George Canning	Succeeded by Parliament of Great Britain
Parliament of the United Kingdom
Preceded by Parliament of the United Kingdom	Member of Parliament for Wendover; 1801–1802; With: George Canning	Succeeded by Charles Long; John Smith
Preceded by Hon. James Stuart-Wortley; John Lubbock	Member of Parliament for Bossiney; 1802–1803; With: Hon. James Stuart-Wortley	Succeeded by Hon. James Stuart-Wortley; George Peter Holford
Preceded by Thomas Myers; John Robinson	Member of Parliament for Harwich; 1803–1818; With: Thomas Myers January–April 1803; James Adams 1803–1806, March–May 1807; William Henry Fremantle 1806–1807; William Huskisson 1807–1812; Nicholas Vansittart 1812–1818	Succeeded by Nicholas Vansittart; Charles Bathurst
Political offices
Preceded by George Rose; Charles Long	Secretary to the Treasury; 1801–1802; With: Nicholas Vansittart	Succeeded by Nicholas Vansittart; John Sargent
Preceded by Thomas Steele; The Lord Glenbervie	Paymaster of the Forces; 1803–1804; With: Thomas Steele	Succeeded by George Rose; Lord Charles Somerset
Preceded by Henry Goulburn	Under-Secretary of State for Home Affairs; 1812–1818	Succeeded by Henry Clive
