= Marie-France van Heel =

Spouse of the British Prime Minister since 2026

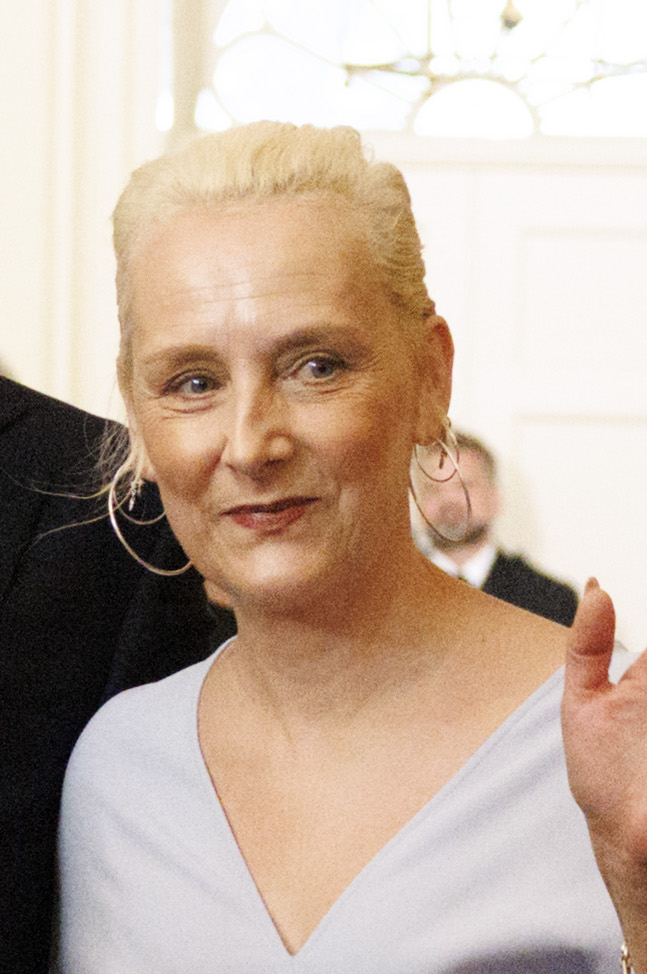
- Van Heel in 2026
- Born: January 1970 (age 56); Roslyn, Pennsylvania, US
- Other name: Frankie van Heel
- Education: Fitzwilliam College, Cambridge
- Occupations: Businesswoman; marketing executive
- Known for: Spouse of the prime minister of the United Kingdom (2026–present)
- Spouse: Andy Burnham (m. 2000)
- Children: 3

Marie-France van Heel (born January 1970) is a marketing executive. She is married to Andy Burnham, the prime minister of the United Kingdom and the leader of the Labour Party.

== Early life and education ==
Van Heel was born in January 1970 in Roslyn, Pennsylvania, United States, to Dutch parents. As a child, Van Heel lived in the Netherlands and Belgium. In the late 1980s, she moved to the United Kingdom to read English at Fitzwilliam College, Cambridge.

Van Heel met Andy Burnham while at Cambridge. In January 1992, while in a relationship with Burnham, she appeared on the television dating game show Blind Date, where she went on a blind date with Will Harris, who later became marketing director of the Conservative Party.

== Career ==
After graduating from the University of Cambridge, van Heel worked in various roles in marketing across a variety of companies. She worked at Sky and was among the team that worked on the logo designs for the BBC and England Rugby. Van Heel worked for three years at her own firm, MVH Marketing, before dissolving it in 2011. She became chief strategy officer for London-based campaign designer Heavenly in 2022, joined the board of directors of Manchester-based electric vehicle charging network Be.EV in 2024, and became chief marketing officer of the latter's parent firm Iduna Infrastructure.

At the time of Burnham's 2026 Labour Party leadership election campaign, she was sitting on the board of humanitarian organisation Plan International. With them, she had worked with Marie Curie, Alzheimer's Society, Great Ormond Street Hospital, and Guy's & St Thomas' NHS Foundation Trust.

== Personal life ==
Van Heel and Burnham married in 2000, and have a son and two daughters. Van Heel joined Burnham for his 2015 Labour Party leadership election campaign but subsequently avoided the public eye.

Unofficial roles
Preceded by Victoria Starmer	Spouse of the Prime Minister of the United Kingdom; 2026–present	Incumbent
