= Viscount Sidmouth =

Viscountcy in the Peerage of the United Kingdom

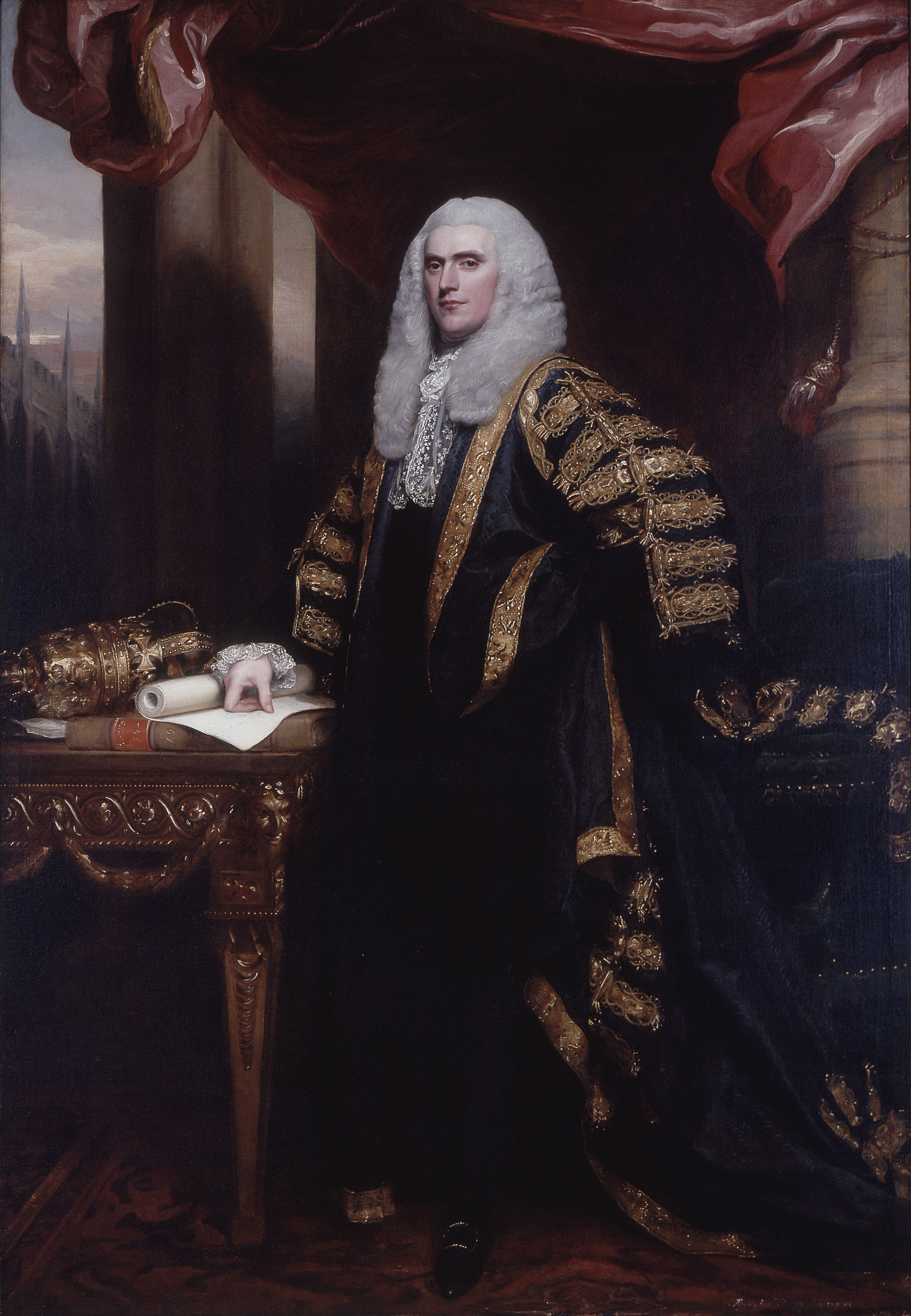
Portrait of Henry Addington by John Singleton Copley. Addington was made the first Viscount Sidmouth in 1805.

Viscount Sidmouth, of Sidmouth in the County of Devon, is a title in the Peerage of the United Kingdom. It was created on 12 January 1805 for the former prime minister, Henry Addington. In May 1804, King George III intended to confer the titles of Earl of Banbury, Viscount Wallingford and Baron Reading on Addington (an earldom was the customary retirement honour for a former prime minister). However, Addington refused the honour and chose to remain in the House of Commons until 1805, when he joined William Pitt the Younger's government as Lord President of the Council with the lesser title of Viscount Sidmouth. His grandson, the third viscount, briefly represented Devizes in Parliament. The current holder of the title is the latter's great-great-grandson, the eighth viscount, who succeeded his father in 2005.

Anthony Addington, father of the first viscount, was a distinguished physician. Henry Unwin Addington, nephew of the first viscount, was a diplomat and civil servant.

The family seat now is Highway Manor (near Calne, Wiltshire) which was inherited in 1936. The former ancestral seat was Upottery Manor, near Upottery, Devon.

== Viscounts Sidmouth (1805) ==
- Henry Addington, 1st Viscount Sidmouth (1757–1844)
- William Leonard Addington, 2nd Viscount Sidmouth (1794–1864)
- William Wells Addington, 3rd Viscount Sidmouth (1824–1913)
- Gerald Anthony Pellew Bagnall Addington, 4th Viscount Sidmouth (1854–1915)
- Gerald William Addington, 5th Viscount Sidmouth (1882–1953)
- Raymond Anthony Addington, 6th Viscount Sidmouth (1887–1976)
- John Tonge Anthony Pellew Addington, 7th Viscount Sidmouth (1914–2005)
- Jeremy Francis Addington, 8th Viscount Sidmouth (b. 1947)

The heir apparent is the present holder's son, the Hon. John Addington (b. 1990).

== Arms ==
Coat of arms of Viscount Sidmouth
Crest A Cat-a-mountain sejant guardant proper bezanty the dexter forepaw resting on an inescutcheon azure charged with a mace erect surmounted with a regal crown or within a bordure engrailed argent. Escutcheon Per pale ermine and ermines, a chevron charged with five lozenges counterchanged between three fleurs-de-lis or. Supporters Two stags, the dexter ermines the sinister ermine, both attired and gorged with a chain pendant therefrom a key all or. Motto Libertas sub rege pio (Liberty under a pious king)

== See also ==
- Tom Addington
