= First Parliament of the United Kingdom =

Parliament of the United Kingdom, 1801–1802

1st Parliament of the United Kingdom
←	18th (GB); 1798–1800 (Ire)	2nd	→
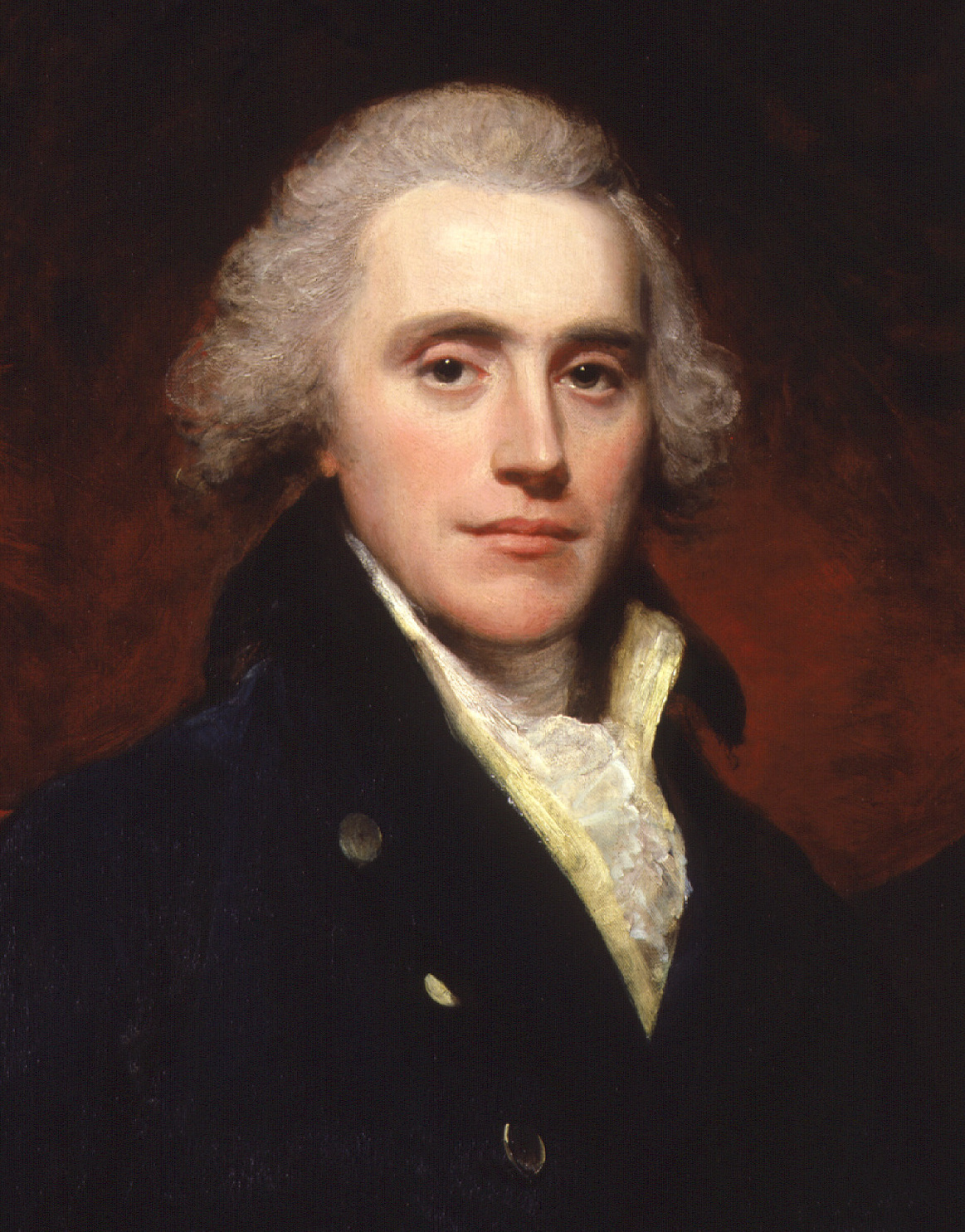
- Henry Addington, Prime Minister during most of the 1st Parliament. 1803 portrait by William Beechey.

Overview
- Meeting place: Palace of Westminster
- Term: 22 January 1801 – 29 June 1802
- Election: None; co-option from 1796 British general election and 1797 Irish general election
- Government: Pitt I; Addington
- Opposition: Foxites

House of Commons
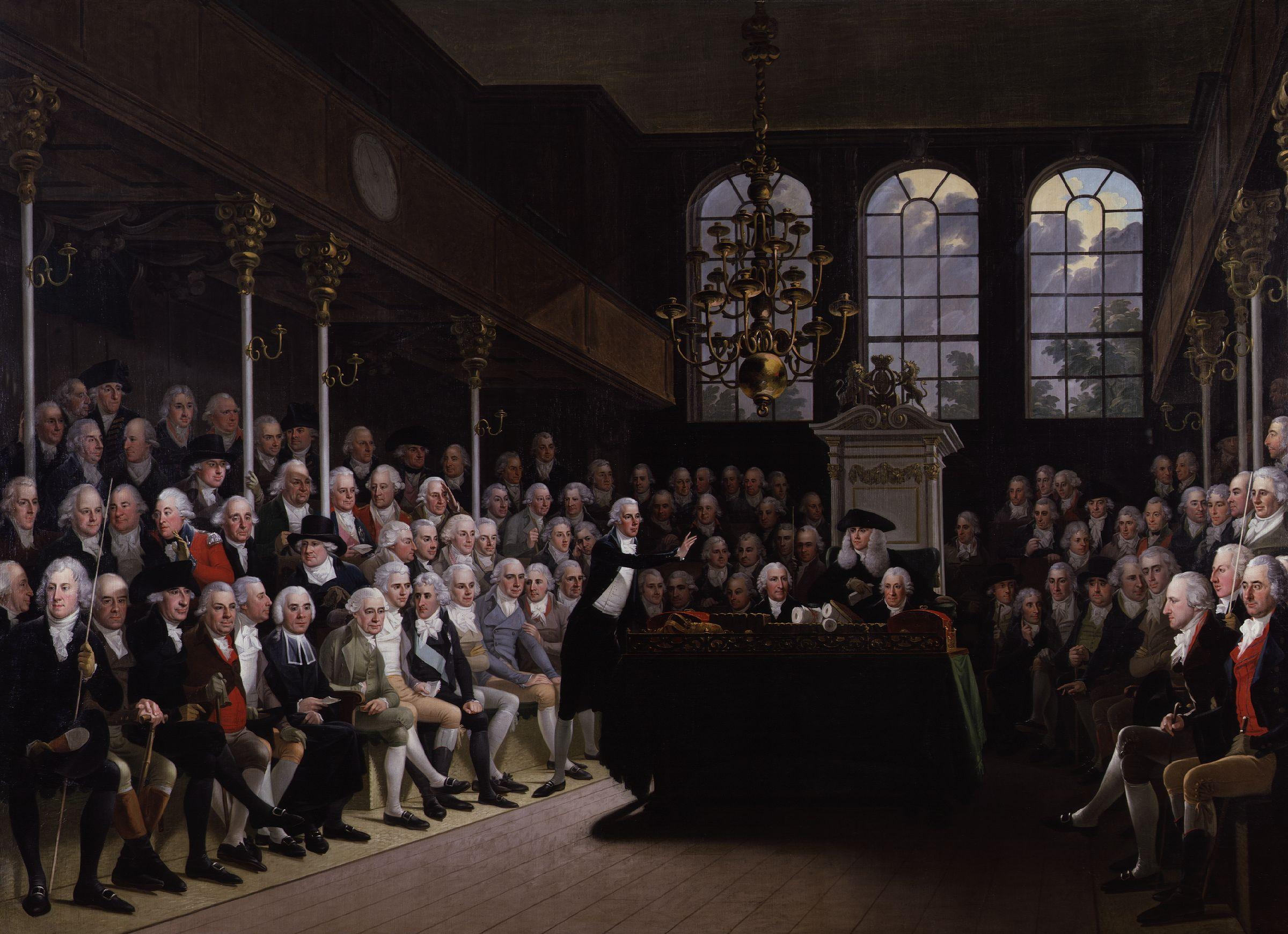
- Members: 658 MPs
- Speaker of the House of Commons: Henry Addington; John Mitford; Charles Abbot
- Leader of the House of Commons: William Pitt; Henry Addington
- Party control: Tories

House of Lords
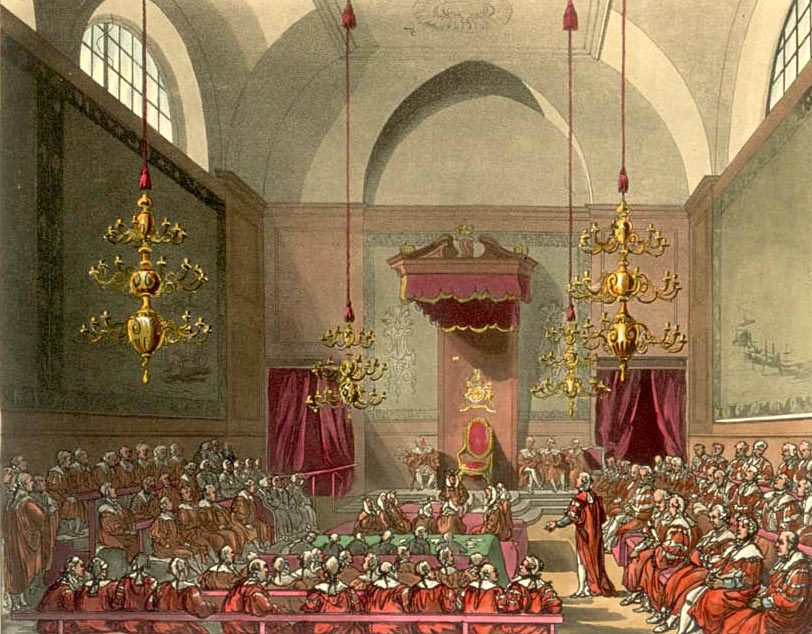
- Lord Keeper of the Great Seal/ Lord Chancellor: Lord Loughborough; Lord Eldon
- Leader of the House of Lords: Lord Grenville; Lord Hobart; Lord Pelham

Sessions
- 1st: 22 January 1801 – 2 July 1801
- 2nd: 29 October 1801 – 28 June 1802

In the first Parliament to be held after the Union of Great Britain and Ireland on 1 January 1801, the first House of Commons of the United Kingdom was composed of all 558 members of the former Parliament of Great Britain and 100 of the members of the House of Commons of Ireland.

The Parliament of Great Britain had held its last general election in 1796 and last met on 5 November 1800. The final general election for the Parliament of Ireland had taken place in 1797, although by-elections had continued to take place until 1800.

The other chamber of the Parliament, the House of Lords, consisted of members of the pre-existing House of Lords in Great Britain, in addition to 28 Irish representative peers elected by members of the former Irish House of Lords.

By a proclamation dated 5 November 1800, the members of the new united Parliament were summoned to a first meeting at Westminster on 22 January 1801. At the outset, the Tories led by Addington enjoyed a majority of 108 in the new House of Commons.

== Political situation ==
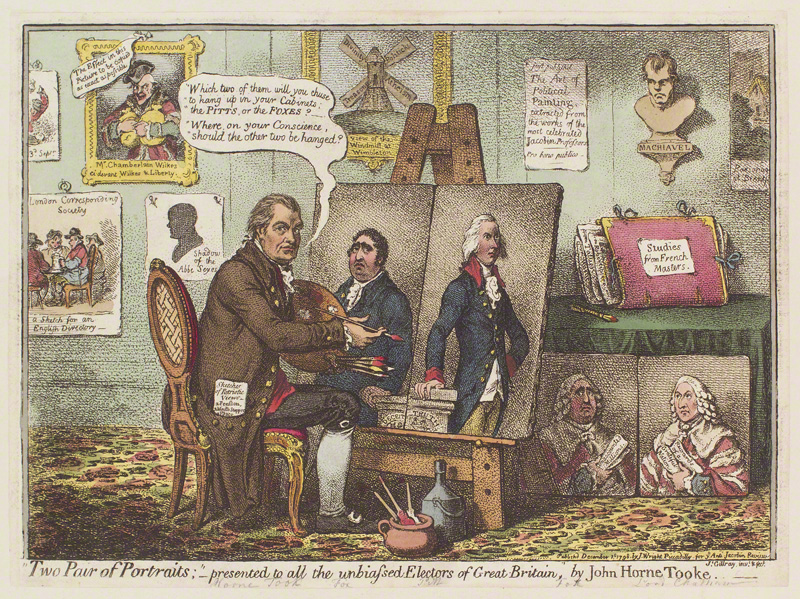
"Two Pair of Portraits;" – presented to all the unbiassed Electors of Great Britain, an anti-Whig caricature published in 1798 by James Gillray showing Fox as the personification of vice next to a portrait of Pitt as the embodiment of honesty, followed by portraits of their fathers, Lord Holland and Lord Chatham displayed below. The title is an allusion to a pamphlet by John Horne Tooke.

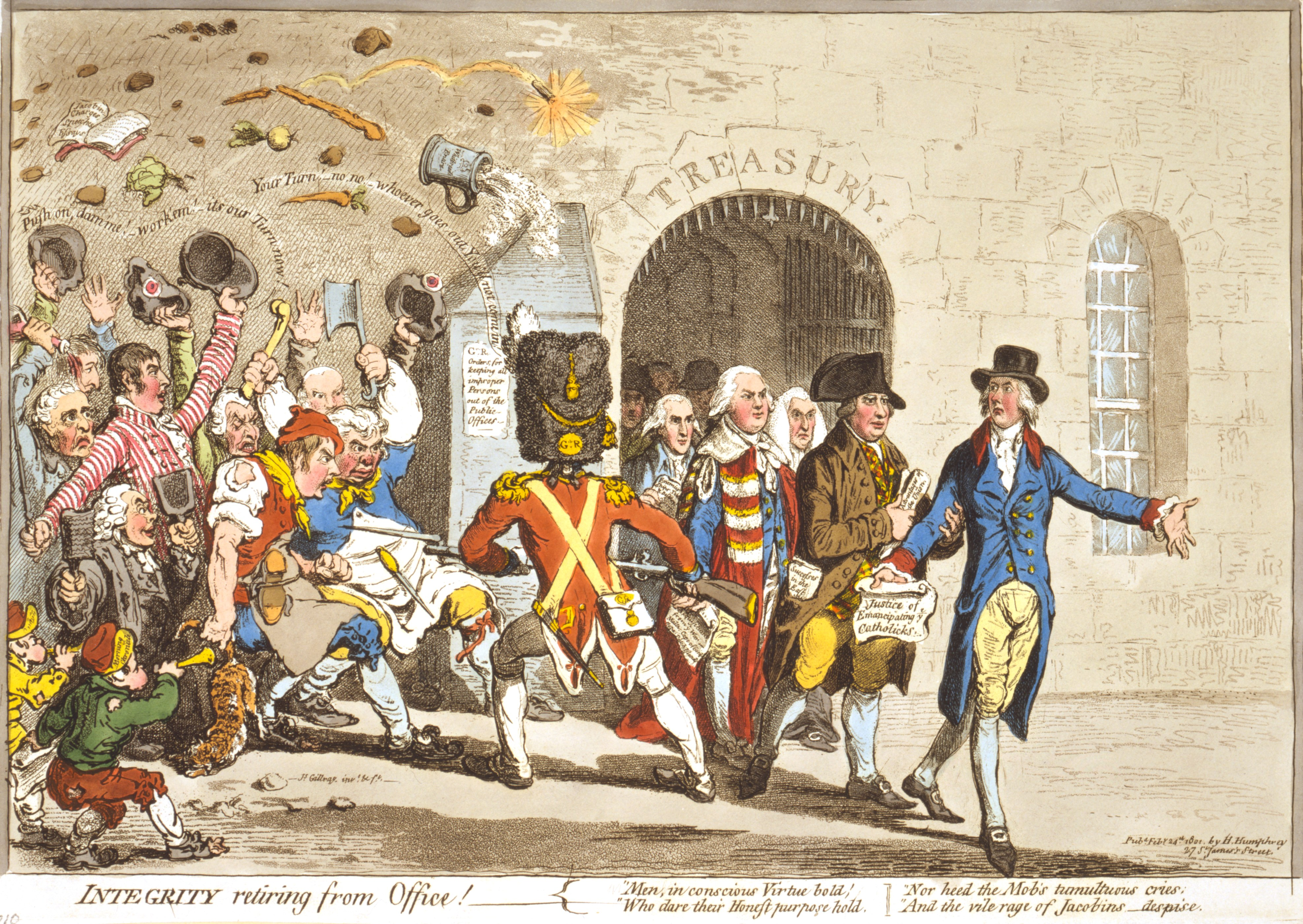
In Integrity retiring from Office! (1801), James Gillray caricatured the resignation of Pitt's ministry in 1801.

Great Britain had been at war with France since 1792. The Prime Minister since 1783, William Pitt the Younger, led a broad wartime coalition of Whig and Tory politicians.

The principal opposition to Pitt was a relatively weak faction of Whigs, led by Charles James Fox. For four years after 1797 opposition attendance at Westminster had been sporadic as Fox pursued a strategy of secession from Parliament. Only a small group, led by George Tierney, had attended frequently to oppose the ministers. As Foord observes "only once did the minority reach seventy-five, and it was often less than ten".

The Act of Union 1800 created the United Kingdom by merging the previous Kingdoms of Great Britain and Ireland. The first Parliament of the United Kingdom was composed of all the members of the last Parliament of Great Britain and some of the members of the final Parliament of Ireland.

Pitt wished to grant Catholic emancipation (the right for Roman Catholics to sit in Parliament), to help reconcile the Irish Catholic majority with the Union. King George III was opposed to that policy, so Pitt was compelled to resign in March 1801.

The new Tory Prime Minister was Henry Addington. He led another wartime administration of pro-government Whigs and Tories, collectively referred to as the "Addingtonians". This was however weaker than Pitt's ministry as Pitt and his faction did not join the new government.

The younger opposition Whigs also became more involved in parliamentary opposition. Charles Grey, on 25 March 1801, tried to persuade the House of Commons to set up a Committee on the State of the Nation. His motion was lost, but it attracted 105 supporters. The Foxite leaders gradually ended their secession from Parliament.

Pitt was generally supportive of the Addington ministry, but was semi-detached from it. As the well-known couplet tellingly observed: "Pitt is to Addington, as London is to Paddington", which indicates the contemporary view of the relative abilities of the two prime ministers.

== Dates of co-option ==
All British MPs and those Irish members representing constituencies which retained two members after the Union (the 32 Irish counties and the cities of Dublin and Cork) automatically retained their seats when the Union took effect on 1 January 1801.

Those members of the Irish House of Commons to sit at Westminster, who represented constituencies still enfranchised after the Union but reduced from two members to one (the remaining 31 most considerable Irish boroughs and Dublin University), were selected by drawing lots. If one of the seats in the Irish Parliament was vacant, then the remaining member for the constituency was automatically chosen for the Westminster Parliament. If both seats were vacant a by-election was held.

== Summary of the constituencies ==
Monmouthshire (1 County constituency with 2 MPs and one single member Borough constituency) is included in Wales in these tables. Sources for this period may include the county in England.

Table 1: Constituencies and MPs, by type and country

Country	BC	CC	UC	Total C	BMP	CMP	UMP	Total MPs
England	202	39	2	243	404	78	4	486
Wales	13	13	0	26	13	14	0	27
Scotland	15	30	0	45	15	30	0	45
Ireland	33	32	1	66	35	64	1	100
Total	263	114	3	380	467	176	5	658

Table 2: Number of seats per constituency, by type and country

Country	BCx1	BCx2	BCx4	CCx1	CCx2	UCx1	UCx2	Total C
England	4	196	2	0	39	0	2	243
Wales	13	0	0	12	1	0	0	26
Scotland	15	0	0	30	0	0	0	45
Ireland	31	2	0	0	32	1	0	66
Total	63	198	2	42	72	1	2	380

== See also ==
- List of parliaments of the United Kingdom
- List of MPs in the first United Kingdom Parliament
- Members of the 1st UK Parliament from Ireland

== Notes ==
Preceded by New Parliament	1st Parliament of the United Kingdom; 1801–1802	Succeeded by 2nd Parliament
