= Tom Addington =

British Army soldier

Tom Addington

Raymond Thomas Casamajor Addington MC (27 January 1919 – 28 October 2011) was a British Army soldier who won the Military Cross in the Netherlands in 1944/45 for his bravery as a battery captain with the 13th Honourable Artillery Company (HAC), Royal Horse Artillery (RHA).

Addington was the third son of Raymond Anthony Addington (6th Viscount Sidmouth 1887–1976). He was born in Quetta, India (now in Pakistan), where his father was serving in the 26th King George's Own Light Cavalry at Waziristan.

After retiring from the army in 1949, he became a cattle farmer until his death in 2011, aged 92.
