= Portrait of Henry Addington (Beechey) =

Painting by William Beechey

- M. Addington
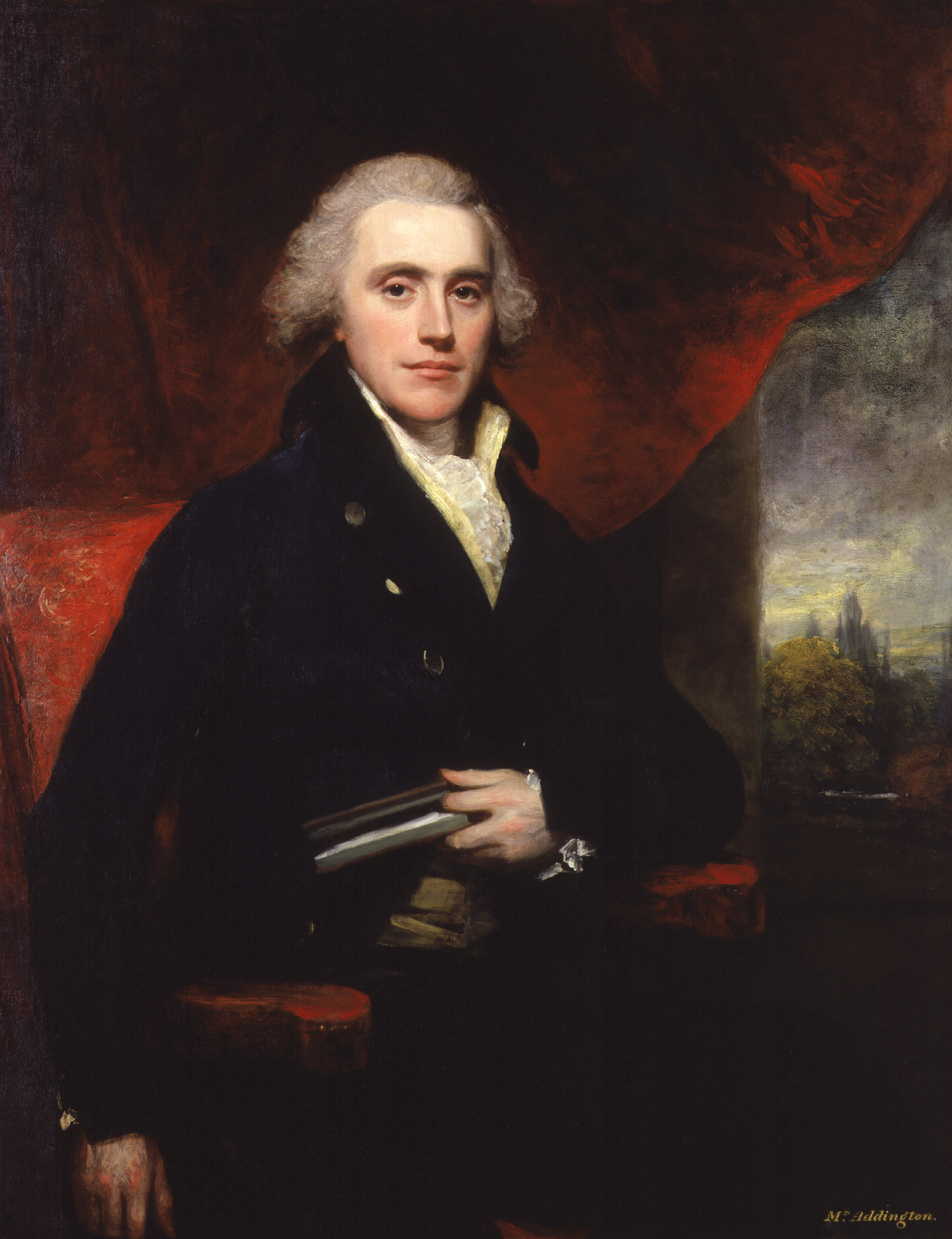
- Artist: William Beechey
- Year: c. 1803
- Medium: Oil on canvas
- Subject: Henry Addington
- Dimensions: 126.5 cm (49.8 in) × 101.5 cm (40.0 in)
- Location: National Portrait Gallery, London
- Accession no.: NPG 5774
- Identifiers: Art UK artwork ID: henry-addington-1st-viscount-sidmouth-155197

Portrait of Henry Addington is an 1803 portrait painting by the English artist William Beechey depicting the then British prime minister Henry Addington.

Addington succeeded William Pitt the Younger in 1801. Following the breakdown over the Peace of Amiens he led Britain in the early Napoleonic Wars and was faced with a threatened French invasion. In 1804, he was replaced by Pitt who returned to the premiership. In 1805, Addington rejoined the government and was made Viscount Sidmouth. From 1812 to 1822, he served as Home Secretary.

Beechey, a member of the Royal Academy, was a prominent portraitist of the Regency era. Today the work is in the collection of the National Portrait Gallery, London, having been acquired in 1985.

== See also ==
- Portrait of Henry Addington (Copley), a 1798 painting by John Singleton Copley
