= Thomas Myers (MP) =

British politician (1764–1835)

Thomas Myers (1764–1835), of 4 Tilney Street, Middlesex and Greys, Sible Hedingham, Essex, was an English Member of Parliament.

He was a Member (MP) of the Parliament of England for Harwich from 1802 to 7 April 1803 and Yarmouth, Isle of Wight 7 December 1810 to 1812.
