= Henry Unwin Addington =

British diplomat and civil servant (1790–1870)

- Born: 24 March 1790; Blounts Court
- Died: 6 March 1870 (aged 79)
- Education: Winchester School
- Spouse: Eleanor Anne Estcourt (m. 1836)
- Father: John Hiley Addington
- Relatives: Henry Addington, 1st Viscount Sidmouth (uncle)

Henry Unwin Addington (24 March 1790 – 6 March 1870) was a British diplomat and civil servant.

== Background ==
Born at Blounts Court, he was the second son of John Hiley Addington, brother of Henry Addington, 1st Viscount Sidmouth, and his wife Mary, daughter of Henry Unwin. He was educated at Winchester School and entered the Foreign Office in 1807.

== Career ==
Addington was attached to the diplomatic mission to Sicily under William Amherst, 1st Earl Amherst in 1809 and took part in the negotiations between Spain and his colonies in 1812. He was transferred to Berlin in April 1813 and to Stockholm in September. In the next year he was appointed Secretary of Legation to Switzerland, an office he held until 1818. He executed this position again in Copenhagen in 1821, however became chargé d'affaires in Washington already a year later.

Addington was promoted to plenipotentiary in London for negotiations with the United States of America in 1826, and was moved to Frankfurt am Main as Minister Plenipotentiary to the German Confederation in 1828. In the following year he was appointed Envoy Extraordinary to Spain. In 1833, he returned to England and became Permanent Under-Secretary of State for Foreign Affairs in 1842. In 1854, he retired and was sworn of the Privy Council of the United Kingdom.

== Family ==
On 17 November 1836, he married Eleanor Anne Estcourt, eldest daughter of Thomas Grimston Bucknall Estcourt at St George's, Hanover Square.

== Literature ==
- Oliver Werner, Privater Eindruck und öffentliche Politik. Der britische Diplomat Henry Unwin Addington in Deutschland, 1813/14 und 1828/29. In: Uwe Ziegler/Horst Carl (ed.), "In unserer Liebe nicht glücklich." Kultureller Austausch zwischen Großbritannien und Deutschland 1770–1840, Goettingen (Vandenhoeck & Ruprecht) 2014, p. 143-158.

Diplomatic posts
Preceded by John Ralph Milbanke	Minister Plenipotentiary to the German Confederation; 1828 – 1829	Succeeded by George William Chad
Preceded by George Bosanquet	Envoy Extraordinary to Spain; 1829 – 1833	Succeeded by George Villiers
Government offices
Preceded by John Backhouse	Permanent Under-Secretary of State for Foreign Affairs; 1842 – 1854	Succeeded by Edmund Hammond
