= Portrait of Henry Addington (Copley) =

Painting by John Singleton Copley

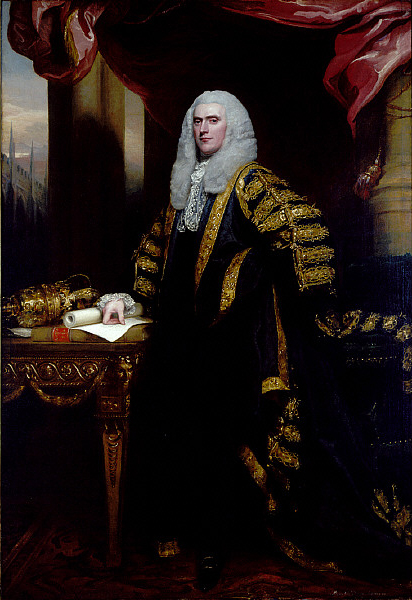
- Artist: John Singleton Copley
- Year: 1797–98
- Type: Oil on canvas, portrait painting
- Dimensions: 237.4 cm × 162.5 cm (93.5 in × 64.0 in)
- Location: Saint Louis Art Museum, Missouri

Portrait of Henry Addington is a c.1798 portrait painting by the Anglo-American artist John Singleton Copley. It depicts the British politician Henry Addington who served as Speaker of the House of Commons from 1789 to 1801. He then served as Prime Minister between 1801 and 1804.

Addington is depicted at full-length in his speaker's robes with the ceremonial mace on the table and view of St Stephen's Chapel, the old House of Commons chamber, on the left. It was one of four paintings Copley submitted to the Royal Academy's Summer Exhibition at Somerset House. It was criticised in a review in the Whitehall Evening Post. Today the painting is in the collection of the Saint Louis Art Museum in Missouri.

== See also ==
- Portrait of Henry Addington (Beechey), an 1803 portrait by the English artist William Beechey

== Bibliography ==
- Epstein, James. Scandal of Colonial Rule: Power and Subversion in the British Atlantic During the Age of Revolution. Cambridge University Press, 2012.
- Kamensky, Jane. A Revolution in Color: The World of John Singleton Copley. W. W. Norton & Company, 2016.
- Prown, Jules David. John Singleton Copley: In England, 1774-1815. National Gallery of Art, Washington, 1966.
