= Henry Addington =

Prime Minister of the United Kingdom from 1801 to 1804

The Right Honourable The Viscount Sidmouth PC
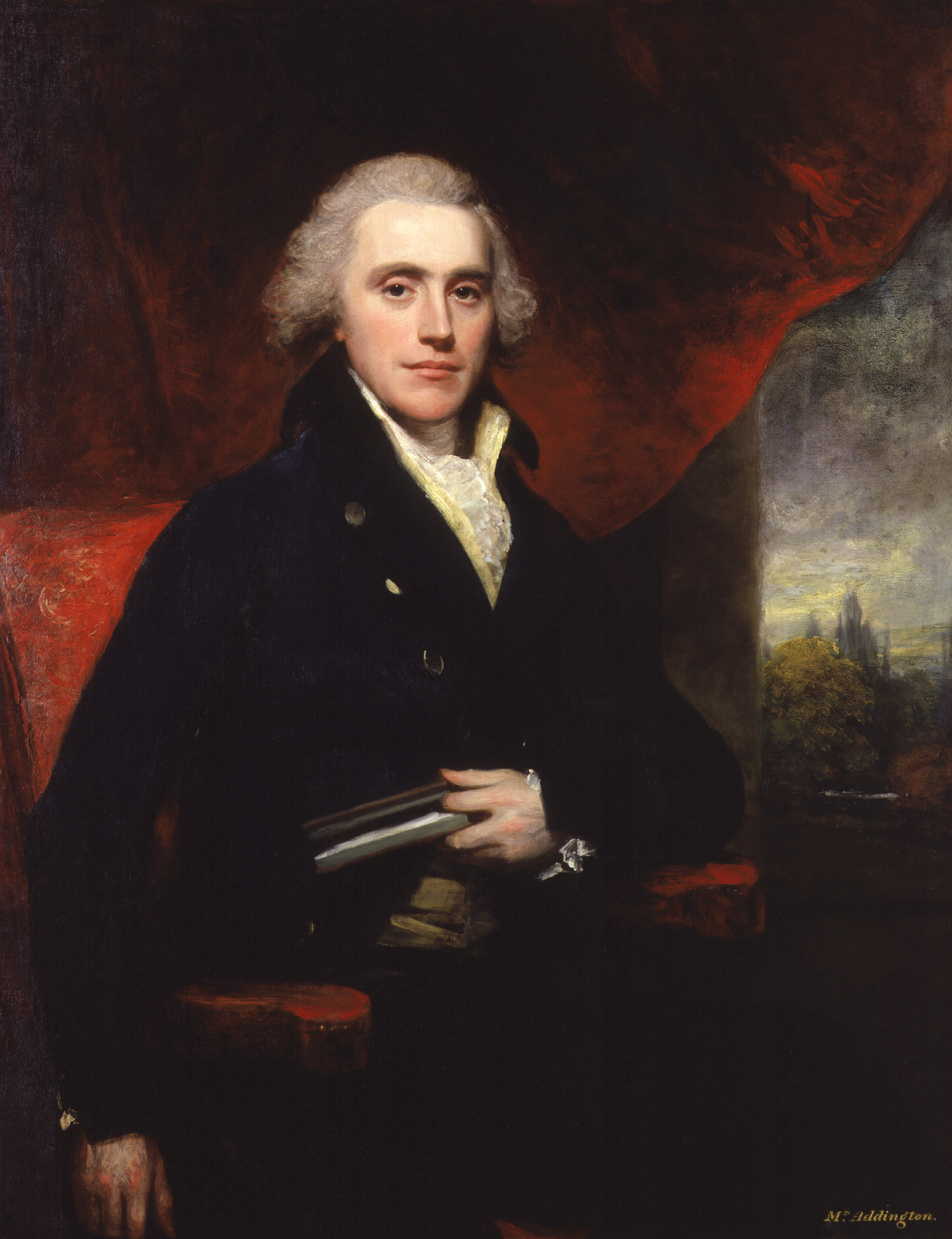
- Portrait of Henry Addington by William Beechey, c. 1803

Prime Minister of the United Kingdom
- In office 17 March 1801 – 10 May 1804
- Monarch: George III
- Preceded by: William Pitt the Younger
- Succeeded by: William Pitt the Younger
Ministerial offices
Home Secretary
In office 11 June 1812 – 17 January 1822
Prime Minister	The Earl of Liverpool
Preceded by	Richard Ryder
Succeeded by	Robert Peel
Lord President of the Council
In office 8 April 1812 – 11 June 1812
Prime Minister	Spencer Perceval; The Earl of Liverpool
Preceded by	The Earl Camden
Succeeded by	The Earl of Harrowby
In office 8 October 1806 – 26 March 1807
Prime Minister	The Lord Grenville
Preceded by	The Earl Fitzwilliam
Succeeded by	The Earl Camden
In office 14 January 1805 – 10 July 1805
Prime Minister	William Pitt the Younger
Preceded by	The Duke of Portland
Succeeded by	The Earl Camden
Lord Privy Seal
In office 5 February 1806 – 15 October 1806
Prime Minister	The Lord Grenville
Preceded by	The Earl of Westmorland
Succeeded by	The Lord Holland
Chancellor of the Exchequer
In office 14 March 1801 – 10 May 1804
Prime Minister	Himself
Preceded by	William Pitt the Younger
Succeeded by	William Pitt the Younger
Leader of the House of Commons
In office 17 March 1801 – 10 May 1804
Prime Minister	Himself
Preceded by	William Pitt the Younger
Succeeded by	William Pitt the Younger

Speaker of the House of Commons of the United Kingdom (Note: Speaker of the House of Commons of the United Kingdom from the Act of Union in January 1801.)
- In office 1 January 1801 – 10 February 1801
- Monarch: George III
- Prime Minister: William Pitt
- Preceded by: Office established
- Succeeded by: Sir John Mitford

Speaker of the House of Commons of Great Britain
- In office 8 June 1789 – 31 January 1800
- Monarch: George III
- Prime Minister: William Pitt
- Preceded by: William Grenville
- Succeeded by: Office abolished

Member of Parliament for Devizes
- In office 1784 – 12 January 1805
- Preceded by: Henry Jones
- Succeeded by: Thomas Grimston Estcourt

Personal details
- Born: 30 May 1757 Bedford Row, Middlesex, England
- Died: 15 February 1844 (aged 86) White Lodge, Surrey, England
- Resting place: St Mary the Virgin, Mortlake
- Party: Tory (Addingtonian)
- Spouses: Ursula Hammond (m. 1781; died 1811) Marianne Townsend (m. 1823)
- Children: 8 (by Hammond)
- Parents: Anthony Addington (father); Mary Addington (mother)
- Relatives: John Hiley Addington (brother); Henry Unwin Addington (nephew)
- Education: Cheam School; Reading School; Winchester College; Brasenose College, Oxford
- Cabinet: § Cabinet

Henry Addington, 1st Viscount Sidmouth (30 May 1757 – 15 February 1844) was a British Tory statesman who served as prime minister of the United Kingdom from 1801 to 1804 and as Speaker of the House of Commons from 1789 to 1801.

Addington is best known for obtaining the Treaty of Amiens in 1802, an unfavourable peace with Napoleonic France which marked the end of the Second Coalition during the French Revolutionary Wars. When that treaty broke down, Addington resumed the war without allies. He conducted relatively weak defensive hostilities, ahead of what would become the War of the Third Coalition. Alongside the Napoleonic wars, his administration also saw the first Kandyan war and subsequent defeat. He was forced from office in favour of William Pitt the Younger, who had preceded Addington as prime minister. Addington is also known for his reactionary crackdown on advocates of democratic reforms during a ten-year spell as Home Secretary from 1812 to 1822. He is the longest continuously serving holder of that office since it was created in 1782.

== Family ==
Henry Addington was the son of Anthony Addington, Pitt the Elder's physician; and Mary Addington, the daughter of the Rev. Haviland John Hiley, headmaster of Reading School. As a consequence of his father's position, Addington was a childhood friend of William Pitt the Younger. Addington studied at Reading School, Winchester College, and Brasenose College, Oxford, and then studied law at Lincoln's Inn.

He married Ursula Mary Hammond in 1781; she brought an income of £1,000 a year into the marriage. The couple had eight children, of whom six survived to adulthood. Ursula died in 1811. Addington subsequently married a widow, Marianne Townsend, daughter of William Scott, 1st Baron Stowell.

== Political career ==
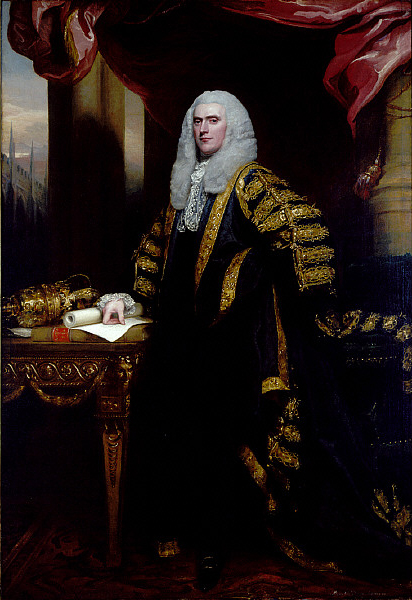
Portrait of Henry Addington by John Singleton Copley, 1798. He is shown in his robes as Speaker.

He was elected to the House of Commons in 1784 as one of the Members of Parliament for Devizes, and became Speaker of the House of Commons in 1789. In March 1801, William Pitt the Younger resigned from office, ostensibly over the refusal of King George III to remove some of the existing political restrictions on Roman Catholics in Ireland (Catholic Emancipation), but poor health, failure in war, economic collapse, alarming levels of social unrest due to famine, and irreconcilable divisions within the Cabinet also played a role. Both Pitt and the King insisted that Addington take over as prime minister, despite his own objections, and his failed attempts to reconcile the King and Pitt.

== Prime Minister ==
Foreign policy was the centrepiece of his term in office. Some historians have been highly critical, saying that it was ignorant and indifferent to Britain's greatest needs. However, Thomas Goldsmith argues that Addington and Hawkesbury conducted a logical, consistent and eurocentric balance-of-power policy, rooted in rules and assumptions governing their conduct, rather than a chaotic free-for-all approach.

Addington's domestic reforms doubled the efficiency of the income tax. In foreign affairs, he secured the Treaty of Amiens in 1802. While the treaty's terms were the bare minimum that the British government could accept, Napoleon Bonaparte would not have agreed to any terms more favourable to the British, and the British government had reached a state of financial collapse from war expenditure, the loss of Continental markets for British goods and two successive failed harvests that had led to widespread famine and social unrest, rendering peace a necessity.

By early 1803, Britain's financial and diplomatic positions had recovered sufficiently to allow Addington to declare war on France, when it became clear that the French would not allow a settlement for the defences of Malta that would have been secure enough to fend off a French invasion that appeared imminent.

At the time and ever since, Addington has been criticised for his lacklustre conduct of the war and his defensive posture. However, without allies, Britain's options were limited to defence. He increased the forces, provided a tax base that could finance an enlarged war, and seized several French possessions. To gain allies, Addington cultivated better relations with the Russian Empire, the Austrian Empire, and the Kingdom of Prussia. These improved relations culminated in the Third Coalition shortly after he left office. He also strengthened British defences against a French invasion through the building of Martello towers on the south coast and the raising of more than 600,000 men-at-arms.

=== Foundling Hospital ===
In 1802, Addington accepted an honorary position as vice-president for life on the Court of Governors of London's Foundling Hospital for abandoned babies.

=== Loss of office ===
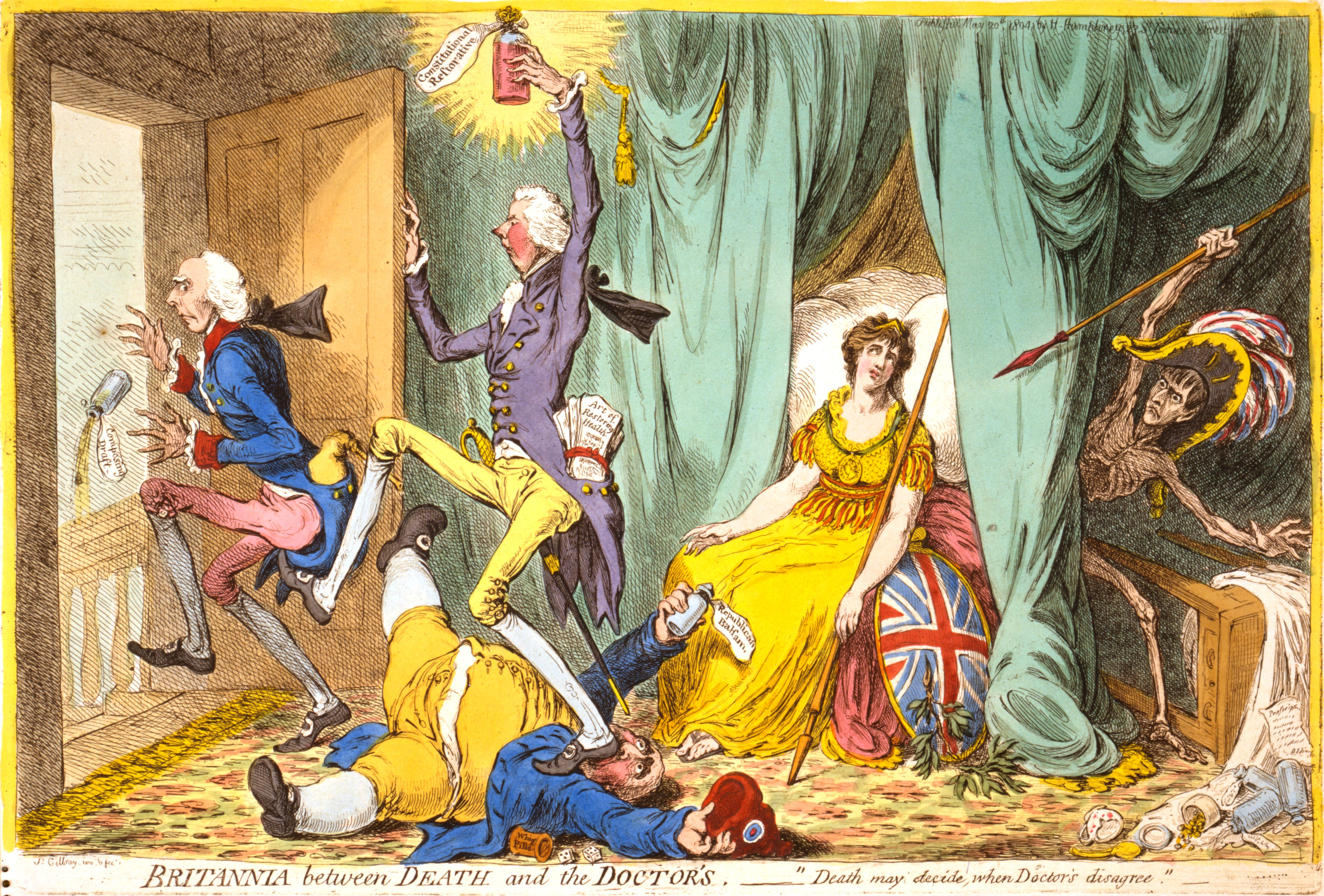
In Britannia between Death and the Doctor's (1804), James Gillray caricatures William Pitt the Younger as a doctor kicking the previous doctor, Addington (who in reality was the son of a doctor), out of Britannia's sickroom. In doing this, Pitt is treading on the face of Charles James Fox. Napoleon is on the right.

Although the King stood by him, it was not enough, because Addington did not have a strong enough hold on both Houses of Parliament. By May 1804, partisan criticism of Addington's war policies provided the pretext for a parliamentary putsch by the three major factions (Grenvillites, Foxites, and Pittites), who had decided that they should replace Addington's ministry. Addington's greatest failing was his inability to manage a parliamentary majority by cultivating the loyal support of MPs beyond his own circle and the friends of the King. That, combined with his mediocre speaking ability, left him vulnerable to Pitt's mastery of parliamentary management and his unparallelled oratory skills. Pitt's parliamentary assault against Addington in March 1804 led to the slimming of his parliamentary majority to the point that defeat in the House of Commons was imminent.

== Lord President and Lord Privy Seal ==
Addington remained an important political figure because he had gained a large following of MPs who supported him loyally in the Commons. He was reconciled with Pitt in December 1804, with the help of Lord Hawkesbury as an intermediary. As a result, Pitt arranged for him to join the Cabinet as Lord President of the Council in January 1805. Pitt insisted Addington accept a peerage to avoid the inconvenience of them sitting together in the Commons. Addington was created Viscount Sidmouth, of Sidmouth in the County of Devon, on 12 January 1805.

In return for the support of the government by Addington's loyal supporters, Pitt agreed to include Robert Hobart, 4th Earl of Buckinghamshire, Addington's colleague, as Chancellor of the Duchy of Lancaster with a promise to elevate him to the first vacancy of a more senior position in the Cabinet. However, when Melville resigned as First Lord of the Admiralty in July 1805, Pitt broke his promise by having Sir Charles Middleton appointed instead of Buckinghamshire. As a result of the betrayal, Addington and Buckinghamshire resigned and took all of their supporters into opposition. Addington was appointed Lord Privy Seal in 1806 in the Ministry of All the Talents that succeeded Pitt. Later that year he returned to the position of Lord President to 1807. His resignation precipitated the fall of the Talents Ministry. Addington was opposed to a limited measure of Catholic Emancipation, which the Cabinet was considering despite the opposition of King George III.

== Home Secretary ==
He returned to government again as Lord President in March 1812, and, in June of the same year, became Home Secretary. As Home Secretary, Addington countered revolutionary opposition with harsh measures, being responsible for the temporary suspension of habeas corpus in 1817 and the passage of the Six Acts in 1819. His tenure also saw the Peterloo Massacre of 1819. He left office in 1822, succeeded as Home Secretary by Sir Robert Peel.

Addington remained in the Cabinet as Minister without Portfolio for the next two years, opposing (along with Arthur Wellesley, 1st Duke of Wellington, other members of Cabinet, and King George IV), British recognition of the South American republics. He remained active in the House of Lords for the next few years, making his final speech in opposition to Catholic Emancipation in 1829 and casting his final vote against the Reform Act 1832.

== Residences and land ==
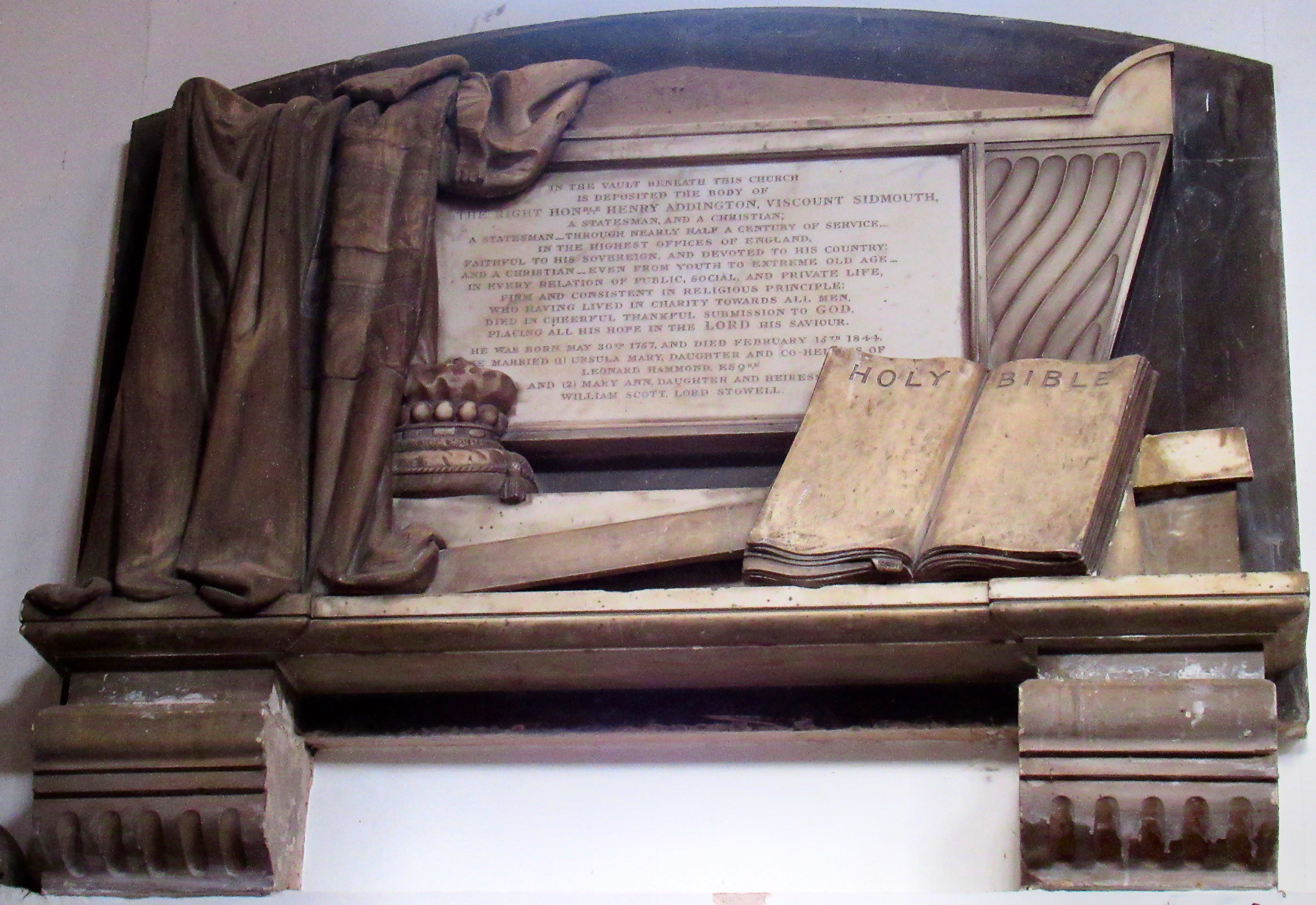
Memorial in Mortlake

Addington maintained homes at Upottery in Devon, and at Bulmershe Court in what is now the Reading suburb of Woodley, but moved to the White Lodge in Richmond Park when he became prime minister. However, he maintained links with Woodley and the Reading area as commander of the Woodley Yeomanry Cavalry and High Steward of Reading. He also donated to the town of Reading the four acres (1.6 ha) of land that is today the site of the Royal Berkshire Hospital, and his name is commemorated in the town's Sidmouth Street and Addington Road as well as in Sidmouth Street in Devizes and Addington Special School in Woodley, Reading. In Devizes he paid for the new Market Cross, designed by James Wyatt, that was constructed in 1814.

As Speaker of the House of Commons, from 1795 he had a residence in the Palace of Westminster, to the north-east of the House of Commons.

== Death ==
Addington died in London on 15 February 1844 at the age of 86, from influenza, and was buried in the churchyard at St Mary the Virgin, Mortlake, on Mortlake High Street, now in Greater London.

== Arms ==
Coat of arms of Henry Addington
Crest A Cat-a-mountain sejant guardant proper bezanty the dexter forepaw resting on an inescutcheon azure charged with a mace erect surmounted with a regal crown or within a bordure engrailed argent. Escutcheon Per pale ermine and ermines, a chevron charged with five lozenges counterchanged between three fleurs-de-lis or. Supporters Two stags, the dexter ermines the sinister ermine ,both attired and gorged with a chain pendant therefrom a key all or. Motto Libertas sub rege pio (Liberty under a pious king)

== Cabinet ==
Portfolio	Minister	Took office	Left office	Party
First Lord of the Treasury; Chancellor of the Exchequer	Henry Addington (head of ministry)	17 March 1801	10 May 1804	Tory
Lord Chancellor	Alexander Wedderburn, 1st Baron Loughborough	Continued	14 April 1801	Independent
Lord Chancellor	John Scott, 1st Baron Eldon	14 April 1801	Continued	Tory
Lord President of the Council	John Pitt, 2nd Earl of Chatham	Continued	30 July 1801	Independent
Lord President of the Council	William Cavendish-Bentinck, 3rd Duke of Portland	30 July 1801	Continued	Tory
Lord Privy Seal	John Fane, 10th Earl of Westmorland	Continued	Continued	Tory
Secretary of State for the Home Department	William Cavendish-Bentinck, 3rd Duke of Portland	Continued	30 July 1801	Tory
Secretary of State for the Home Department	Thomas Pelham, Baron Pelham of Stanmer	30 July 1801	17 August 1803	Tory
Secretary of State for the Home Department	Charles Philip Yorke	17 August 1803	12 May 1804	Tory
Secretary of State for Foreign Affairs	Robert Jenkinson, Baron Hawkesbury	Continued	14 May 1804	Tory
Secretary of State for War and the Colonies	Robert Hobart, Baron Hobart	17 March 1801	12 May 1804	Tory
First Lord of the Admiralty	John Jervis, 1st Earl of St Vincent	Continued	1804	Whig
Master-General of the Ordnance	John Pitt, 2nd Earl of Chatham	June 1801	Continued	Independent
President of the Board of Trade	Charles Jenkinson, 1st Earl of Liverpool	Continued	7 June 1804	Independent
President of the Board of Control	George Legge, 3rd Earl of Dartmouth	May 1801	July 1802	Tory
President of the Board of Control	Robert Stewart, Viscount Castlereagh	July 1802	Continued	Tory

== Notes ==
Parliament of Great Britain
Preceded by Henry Jones; Sir James Tylney-Long	Member of Parliament for Devizes; 1784–1800; With: Sir James Tylney-Long 1784–1788; Joshua Smith 1788–1800	Acts of Union 1800 First Parliament of the United Kingdom
Parliament of the United Kingdom
New parliament	Member of Parliament for Devizes; 1801–1805; Served alongside: Joshua Smith	Succeeded by Thomas Estcourt; Joshua Smith
Political offices
Preceded by William Wyndham Grenville	Speaker of the House of Commons of Great Britain; 1789–1800	Acts of Union 1800 First Parliament of the United Kingdom
First	Speaker of the House of Commons of the United Kingdom; 1801	Succeeded by Sir John Mitford
Preceded by William Pitt the Younger	Prime Minister of the United Kingdom; 17 March 1801 – 10 May 1804	Succeeded by William Pitt the Younger
Preceded by William Pitt the Younger	First Lord of the Treasury; 1801–1804	Succeeded by William Pitt the Younger
Preceded by William Pitt the Younger	Chancellor of the Exchequer; 1801–1804	Succeeded by William Pitt the Younger
Preceded by William Pitt the Younger	Leader of the House of Commons; 1801–1804	Succeeded by William Pitt the Younger
Preceded by The Duke of Portland	Lord President of the Council; 1805	Succeeded by The Earl Camden
Preceded by The Earl of Westmorland	Lord Privy Seal; 1806	Succeeded by The Lord Holland
Preceded by The Earl Fitzwilliam	Lord President of the Council; 1806–1807	Succeeded by The Earl Camden
Preceded by The Earl Camden	Lord President of the Council; 1812	Succeeded by The Earl of Harrowby
Preceded by Richard Ryder	Home Secretary; 1812–1822	Succeeded by Robert Peel
Honorary titles
Preceded by The Lord St Helens	Senior Privy Counsellor; 1839–1844	Succeeded by The Earl of Harrowby
Peerage of the United Kingdom
New creation	Viscount Sidmouth; 1805–1844	Succeeded by William Leonard Addington
