= Anthony Addington =

English physician (1713–1790)

Anthony Addington FRCP
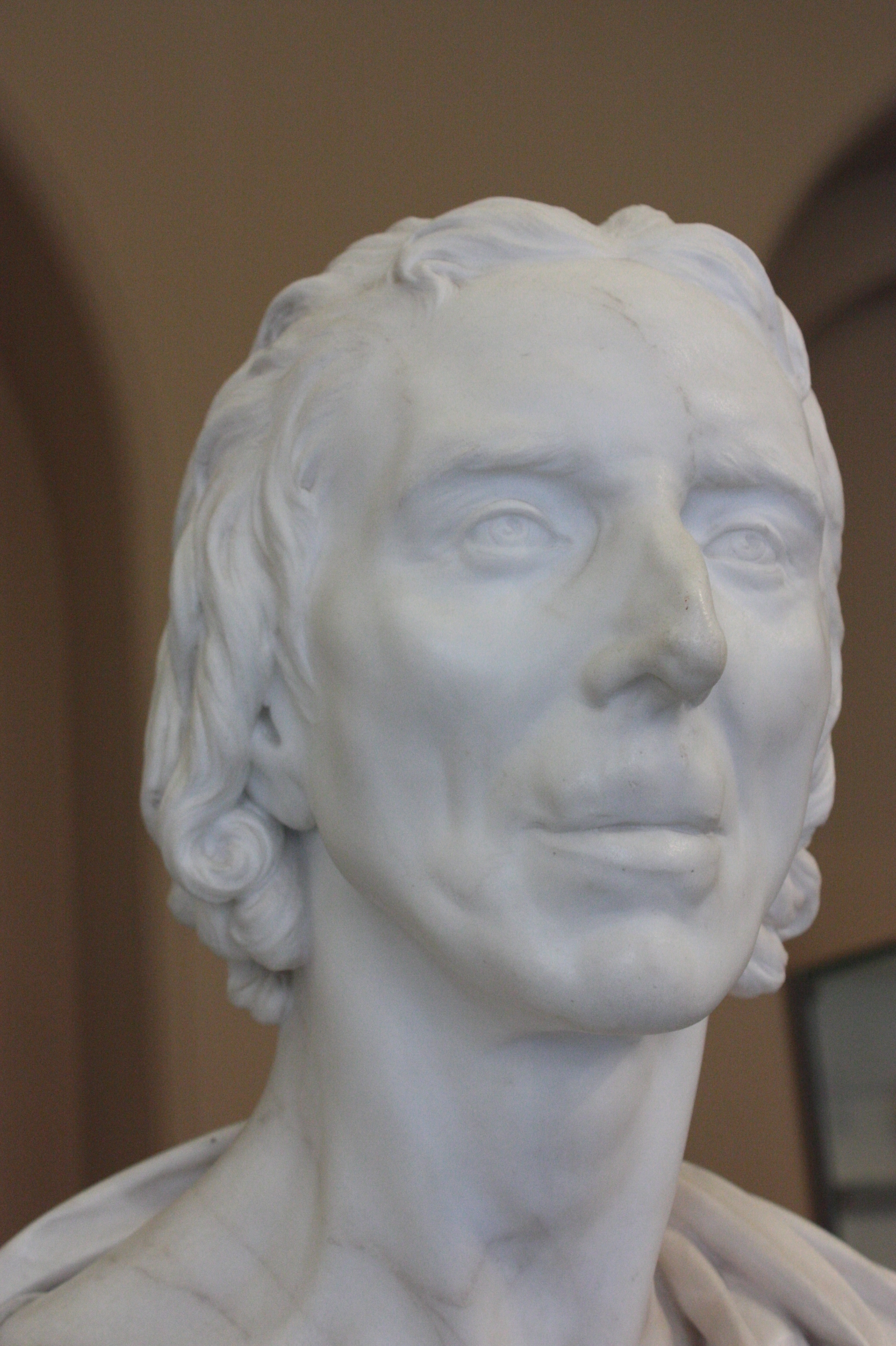
- Dr Anthony Addington by Thomas Banks, 1790, Victoria and Albert Museum
- Born: 1713; Fringford, Oxfordshire
- Died: 22 March 1790 (aged 76–77)
- Education: Winchester College; Trinity College, Oxford
- Occupation: Physician
- Spouse: Mary Hiley (m. 1745)

Anthony Addington (1713 – 22 March 1790) was an English physician.

== Life ==
Addington was born at Fringford, youngest son of Henry Addington (1659-1729), a gentleman who owned a "moderately sized" estate there, where the family had been settled for generations, and his second wife, Elizabeth (c. 1670-1746), daughter of Anthony and Joanna Watts, of Sulgrave, Northamptonshire. He was educated at Winchester College. He went up to Trinity College, Oxford, where he took the degree of M.A. on 13 May 1740 and of M.D. on 24 January 1744. He was subsequently admitted a fellow of the Royal College of Physicians, and went into practice in London, but was compelled by bad health to move to the country. His career gained considerable public attention when he appeared as an expert for the prosecution of Mary Blandy for the poisoning of her father Francis Blandy in 1752. He then retired to Reading in Berkshire, where he derived a large income from his profession, until his death in 1790. He devoted his attention particularly to the treatment of insanity, and was one of the physicians called in to see George III when he first showed symptoms of mental aberration.

Addington was a confidential friend and adviser of Lord Chatham. He took part in unsuccessful negotiations of a coalition between Chatham and Lord Bute.

== Works ==
Addington wrote An Essay on the Sea Scurvy, wherein is proposed an easy method of curing that distemper at sea, and of preserving water sweet for any cruise or voyage. Reading, 1753. In this work, he describes the disease from accounts of others, rather than from his own observation. As treatment he recommended depletion, with the employment of seawater as a purgative, and drinks acidulated with muriatic acid. He conceives meat to be injurious, but regards biscuit as food suitable to persons affected with scurvy. He asserted that the addition of an ounce and a half of muriatic acid to a tun of water, will prevent its putrefaction, and preserve it sweet for any length of time.

An authentic Account of the Part taken by the late Earl Chatham in a Transaction which passed in the beginning of the year 1778 is no longer attributed to Addington.

== Family ==
Addington married in 1745, Mary, daughter of the Rev. Haviland John Hiley, headmaster of Reading grammar school. Henry Addington, 1st Viscount Sidmouth, Prime Minister of the United Kingdom from 1801 to 1804, was their eldest son. John Hiley Addington was the second son.

- Anne, the eldest, married in 1770 William Goodenough M.D., who died that year.
- Eleanor, the second, married James Sutton (died 1801) of Devizes.
- Elizabeth married William Hoskins.
- Charlotte, the youngest, married in 1788 Charles Bragge Bathurst.
