= List of speakers of the House of Commons of the United Kingdom =

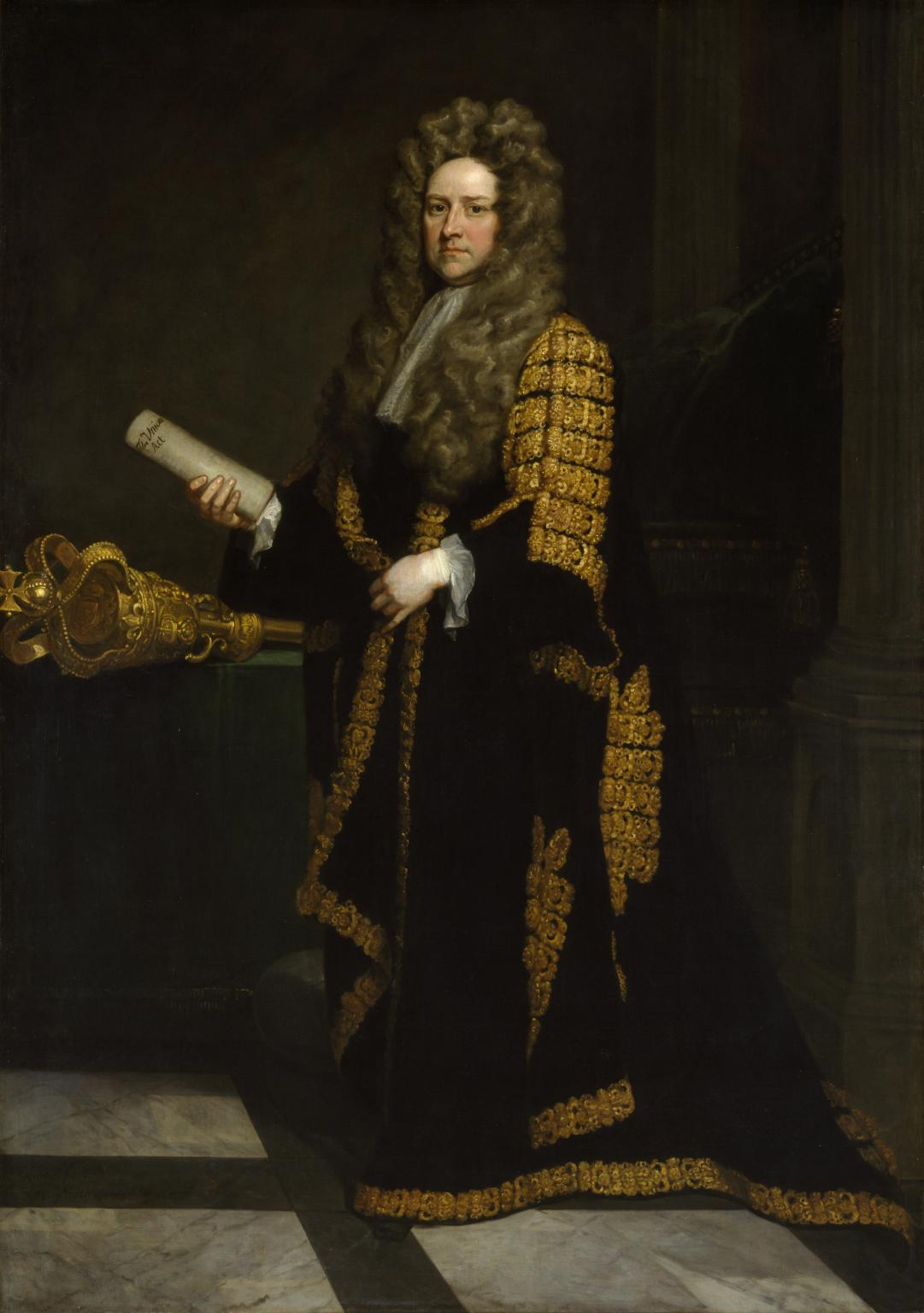
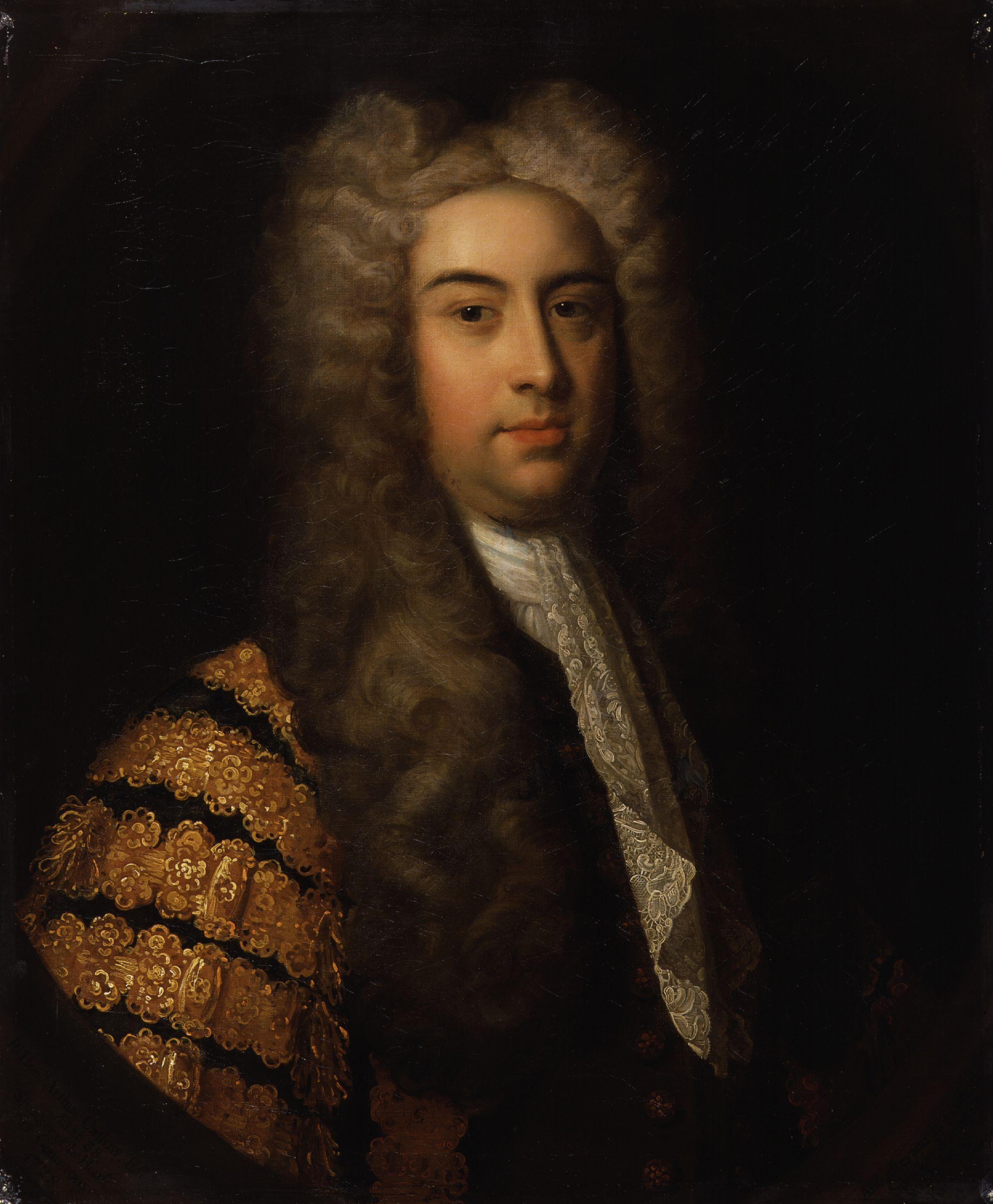
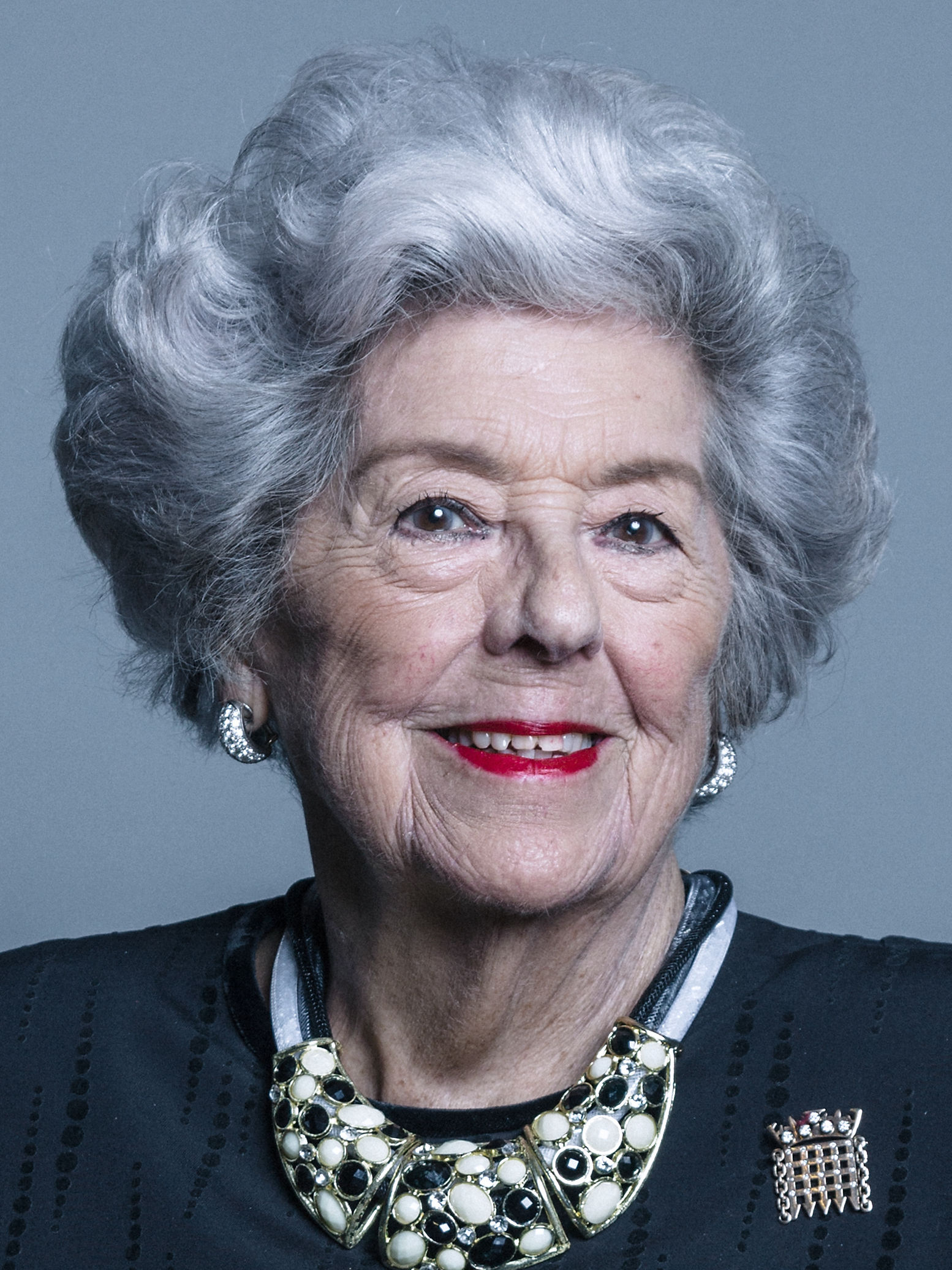
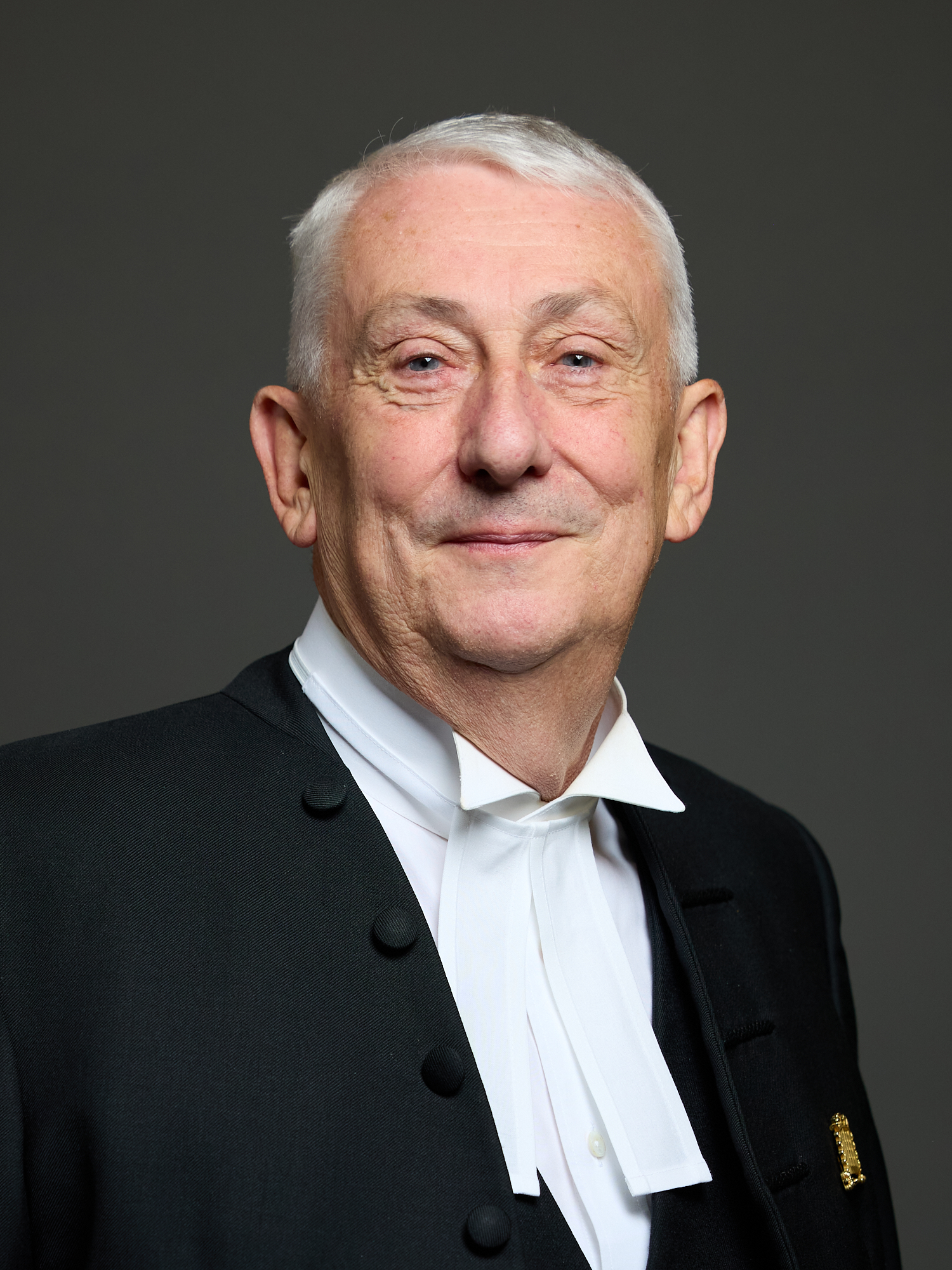
- Top left: John Smith was the first speaker of the modern House of Commons.
- Top right: Arthur Onslow is the longest-serving speaker so far.
- Bottom left: Betty Boothroyd was the first female speaker.
- Bottom right: Lindsay Hoyle is the incumbent speaker.

The Speaker of the House of Commons is the presiding officer of the House of Commons of the United Kingdom. The office was established by the Acts of Union 1800, which combined the Irish House of Commons and House of Commons of Great Britain, forming the modern Commons.

A speaker is elected at the beginning of every parliamentary term and has no term limits. Upon being elected, it is by convention that they disaffiliate themselves with any political parties. As the speaker remains a member of parliament (MP) for their constituency, there is a gentlemen's agreement between major political parties to not run candidates in the speaker's constituency.

The incumbent speaker is Lindsay Hoyle, MP for Chorley, who assumed office on 4 November 2019.

== List of speakers ==
=== House of Commons of Great Britain, 1707–1800 ===
The Kingdom of Great Britain was created by the Acts of Union 1707. At the beginning of 1801, Great Britain was combined with the Kingdom of Ireland to form the United Kingdom of Great Britain and Ireland, with a single House of Commons serving the whole kingdom.

John Smith, Speaker of the House of Commons of England since October 1705, was elected the first Speaker of the House of Commons of Great Britain.

Portrait	Name Constituency (Birth–Death)	Term of office E: Election R: Royal approbation †: Death		Election(s) (in brackets if unopposed) Parliament(s)		Retirement peerage
	John Smith; MP for Andover (1656–1723)	E 23 October; R 30 October 1707	1708 (Note: Smith resigned from the chair to become Chancellor of the Exchequer. He continued to serve in the House of Commons until his death in 1723.)	(1707)	1	—
	Sir Richard Onslow; 2nd Baronet; MP for Surrey (1654–1717)	E 16 November; R 18 November 1708	1710 (Note: Onslow was the last Speaker to be defeated in his constituency in a general election.)	(1708)	2	Baron Onslow
	William Bromley; MP for Oxford University (1663–1732)	E 25 November; R 27 November 1710	1713 (Note: Bromley resigned from the chair to become Secretary of State for the Northern Department. He continued to serve in the House of Commons until his death in 1732.)	(1710)	3	—
	Sir Thomas Hanmer; 4th Baronet; MP for Suffolk (1677–1746)	E 16 February; R 18 February 1714	1715 (Note: Hanmer vacated the chair but continued to serve in the House of Commons until 1727.)	(1714)	4	—
	Sir Spencer Compton; MP for Sussex (c. 1673–1743)	E 17 March; R 21 March 1715	1727 (Note: Compton vacated the chair but continued to serve in the House of Commons until 1728.)	(1715) (1722)	5; 6	Baron Wilmington
	Arthur Onslow; MP for Surrey (1691–1768)	E 23 January; R 27 January 1728	18 March 1761 (Note: Onslow retired on 18 March 1761, receiving the unanimous thanks of the House of Commons.)	(1728) (1735) (1741) (1747) (1754)	7; 8; 9; 10; 11	(Note: Onslow, the longest-serving Speaker, retired from the chair and the House of Commons. He seems to have been the last Speaker who survived his term by a significant period without being offered a peerage. His only son was created Baron Cranley in 20 May 1776, inherited the Baron Onslow on 8 October 1776 through Special Remainder.)
	Sir John Cust; 3rd Baronet; MP for Grantham (1718–1770)	E 3 November; R 6 November 1761	19 January 1770 (Note: On 17 January 1770, Cust sent word to the House of Commons that he was too ill to attend. He resigned on 19 January, and died on 24 January.)	(1761) (1768)	12; 13	(Note: Cust died five days after his resignation, his son was created The Baron Brownlow in 1776.)
	Sir Fletcher Norton; MP for Guildford (1716–1789)	E 22 January; R 23 January 1770	31 October 1780 (Note: Norton was not re-elected as Speaker in 1780, but retained his seat as an MP until 1782.)	1770 (1774)	13; 14	Baron Grantley
	Charles Wolfran Cornwall; MP for Winchelsea until 1784; MP for Rye from 1784 (1735–1789)	E 31 October; R 1 November 1780	2 January 1789^{†}	1780 (1784)	15; 16	(Note: Cornwall died in office.)
	William Wyndham Grenville; MP for Buckinghamshire (1759–1834)	E 5 January 1789 no royal approbation (Note: Due to the illness of King George III, "the usual formalities of receiving the royal permission to elect a speaker, and the royal approbation of him when elected, could not be observed, and Grenville taking his seat immediately performed all the duties of his office.")	5 June 1789 (Note: Grenville resigned from the chair on 5 June 1789 to become Home Secretary. He continued to serve in the House of Commons until 1790.)	Jan. 1789	16	Baron Grenville
	Henry Addington; MP for Devizes (1757–1844)	E 8 June; R 9 June 1789	continued as UK Speaker	Jun. 1789 (1790) (1796)	16; 17; 18	Viscount Sidmouth

=== House of Commons of the United Kingdom from 1801 ===
The United Kingdom of Great Britain and Ireland was created in 1801. In 1922 the Irish Free State ceased to be part of the UK. The official name of the United Kingdom was changed to the United Kingdom of Great Britain and Northern Ireland, in 1927.

Portrait	Name Constituency (Birth–Death)	Term of office E: Election R: Royal approbation †: Death		Election(s) (in brackets if unopposed) Parliament(s)		Party (Note: Party allegiance at the time of first election as Speaker. The modern convention is for the Speaker to sever connections with his or her former party. From 1935, the Speaker has sought re-election as such, not using a party label. The general convention is that the Speaker is not opposed by major party candidates at general elections.)	Retirement peerage
	Henry Addington; MP for Devizes (1757–1844)	E 22 January; R 23 January 1801	10 February 1801 (Note: Addington resigned from the chair on 10 February 1801 to become Prime Minister. He continued to serve in the House of Commons until 1805.)	(Jan. 1801)	1	Tory	Viscount Sidmouth
	Sir John Mitford; MP for East Looe (1748–1830)	E 11 February; R 12 February 1801	9 February 1802 (Note: Mitford resigned from the chair on 9 February 1802 to become the Lord High Chancellor of Ireland.)	(Feb. 1801)	1	Tory	Baron Redesdale
	Charles Abbot; MP for Helston until 1802; MP for Woodstock 1802–1806; MP for Oxford University after 1806 (1757–1829)	E 10 February; R 11 February 1802	2 June 1817	(Feb. 1802) (Nov. 1802) (1806) (1807) (1812)	1; 2; 3; 4; 5	Tory	Baron Colchester
	Sir Charles Manners-Sutton; MP for Scarborough until 1832; MP for Cambridge University after 1832 (1780–1845)	E 2 June; R 3 June 1817	19 February 1835 (Note: In 1835 he was defeated for re-election as Speaker, but retained his seat as an MP for a few weeks until he was created a peer. No subsequent Speaker has been defeated or remained in the House of Commons, for more than a few days after leaving the chair.)	1817 (1819) (1820) (1826) (1830) (1831); 1833	5; 6; 7; 8; 9; 10; 11	Tory	Viscount Canterbury
	James Abercromby; MP for Edinburgh (1776–1858)	E 19 February; R 20 February 1835	27 May 1839	1835 (1837)	12; 13	Whig	Baron Dunfermline
	Charles Shaw-Lefevre; MP for North Hampshire (1794–1888)	E 27 May; R 28 May 1839	30 April 1857	1839 (1841) (1847) (1852)	13; 14; 15; 16	Whig	Viscount Eversley
	John Evelyn Denison; MP for North Nottinghamshire (1800–1873)	E 30 April; R 1 May 1857	9 February 1872	(1857) (1859) (1866) (1868)	17; 18; 19; 20	Liberal	Viscount Ossington
	Sir Henry Brand; MP for Cambridgeshire (1814–1892)	E 9 February; R 12 February 1872	26 February 1884	(1872) (1874) (1880)	20; 21; 22	Liberal	Viscount Hampden
	Arthur Peel; MP for Warwick until 1885; MP for Warwick and Leamington after 1885 (1829–1912)	E 26 February; R 27 February 1884	10 April 1895	(1884) (Jan. 1886) (Aug. 1886) (1892)	22; 23; 24; 25	Liberal	Viscount Peel
	William Court Gully; MP for Carlisle (1835–1909)	E 10 April; R 22 April 1895	8 June 1905	Apr. 1895 (Aug. 1895) (1900)	25; 26; 27	Liberal	Viscount Selby
	James Lowther; MP for Penrith until 1918; MP for Penrith and Cockermouth after 1918 (1855–1949)	E 8 June; R 20 June 1905	28 April 1921	(1905) (1906) (1910) (1911) (1919)	27; 28; 29; 30; 31	Conservative	Viscount Ullswater
	John Henry Whitley; MP for Halifax (1866–1935)	E & R 28 April 1921	20 June 1928	(1921) (1922) (Jan. 1924) (Dec. 1924)	31; 32; 33; 34	Liberal (Coalition)	(Note: Whitley declined the customary peerage upon his retirement from the chair and the House of Commons.)
	Edward FitzRoy; MP for Daventry (1869–1943)	E 20 June; R 21 June 1928	3 March 1943^{†}	(1928) (1929) (1931) (1935)	34; 35; 36; 37	Conservative	(Note: Fitzroy died in office. His widow was created The Viscountess Daventry.)
	Douglas Clifton Brown; MP for Hexham (1879–1958)	E & R 9 March 1943	31 October 1951	(1943) (1945) (1950)	37; 38; 39	Conservative	Viscount Ruffside
	William Morrison; MP for Cirencester and Tewkesbury (1893–1961)	E 31 October; R 1 November 1951	19 September 1959	1951 (1955)	40; 41	Conservative	Viscount Dunrossil
	Sir Harry Hylton-Foster; MP for Cities of London and Westminster (1905–1965)	E 20 October; R 21 October 1959	2 September 1965^{†}	(1959) (1964)	42; 43	Conservative	(Note: Hylton-Foster died in office. His widow was created The Baroness Hylton-Foster for Life.)
	Horace King; MP for Southampton Itchen (1901–1986)	E & R 26 October 1965	12 January 1971	(1965) (1966) (1970)	43; 44; 45	Labour	Baron Maybray-King for Life
	Selwyn Lloyd; MP for Wirral (1904–1978)	E & R 12 January 1971	3 February 1976	1971 (Mar. 1974) (Oct. 1974)	45; 46; 47	Conservative	Baron Selwyn-Lloyd for Life
	George Thomas; MP for Cardiff West (1909–1997)	E & R 3 February 1976	10 June 1983	(1976) (1979)	47; 48	Labour	Viscount Tonypandy
	Bernard Weatherill; MP for Croydon North East (1920–2007)	E 15 June; R 16 June 1983	9 April 1992	(1983) (1987)	49; 50	Conservative	Baron Weatherill for Life
	Betty Boothroyd; MP for West Bromwich West (1929–2023)	E 27 April; R 28 April 1992	23 October 2000	1992 (1997)	51; 52	Labour	Baroness Boothroyd for Life
	Michael Martin; MP for Glasgow Springburn until 2005; MP for Glasgow North East after 2005 (1945–2018)	E & R 23 October 2000	22 June 2009 (Note: Martin resigned the speakership in 2009. He was the first Speaker to be forced to leave the chair by public pressure since Sir John Trevor was expelled from the House and the chair in 1695.)	2000 (2001) (2005)	52; 53; 54	Labour	Baron Martin of Springburn for Life
	John Bercow; MP for Buckingham (born 1963)	E & R 22 June 2009	4 November 2019	2009 (2010) (2015) (2017)	54; 55; 56; 57	Conservative	—
	Sir Lindsay Hoyle; MP for Chorley (born 1957)	E & R 4 November 2019	Incumbent	Nov. 2019 (Dec. 2019) (2024)	57; 58; 59	Labour	—

== Bibliography ==
- Butler, David; Butler, Gareth (2000). Twentieth Century Political Facts 1900–2000. Macmillan Press. ISBN 0-333-77221-0.
- Cobbett, William. The Parliamentary History of England. T. C. Hansard.
- Cook, Chris; Keith, Brendan (1975). British Historical Facts 1830–1900. Macmillan Press.
- Cook, Chris; Stevenson, John (1980). British Historical Facts 1760–1830. Macmillan Press. ISBN 0-333-21512-5.
- Laundy, Philip (1964). The Office of Speaker. Cassell & Company.
- Marsden, Philip (1979). The Officers of the Commons 1363–1978. Her Majesty's Stationery Office.
- Venning, Timothy (2005). Compendium of British Office Holders. Palgrave Macmillan. ISBN 978-1-4039-2045-4.
