= Speaker of the British House of Commons election =

The following is a list of elections for the office of Speaker of the House of Commons of the United Kingdom:

- 1895 Speaker of the British House of Commons election
- 1951 Speaker of the British House of Commons election
- 1965 Speaker of the British House of Commons election
- 1971 Speaker of the British House of Commons election
- 1976 Speaker of the British House of Commons election
- 1983 Speaker of the British House of Commons election
- 1992 Speaker of the British House of Commons election
- 2000 Speaker of the British House of Commons election
- 2009 Speaker of the British House of Commons election
- 2019 Speaker of the British House of Commons election
