= Parliament of Great Britain =

United English and Scottish parliament 1707–1800

Coordinates: 51°29′57″N 00°07′29″W

Parliament of the Kingdom of Great Britain
- Royal coat of arms of Great Britain, 1714–1800

Type
- Type: Bicameral
- Houses: House of Lords; House of Commons

History
- Established: 1 May 1707
- Disbanded: 31 December 1800
- Preceded by: Parliament of England; Parliament of Scotland
- Succeeded by: Parliament of the United Kingdom of Great Britain and Ireland

Leadership
- Lord Chancellor: Lord Loughborough (from 1793)
- Speaker of the House: Henry Addington (from 1789)

Structure
- House of Commons political groups: Final composition of the British House of Commons: 558 seats Tories: 424 seats Whigs: 95 seats Others: 39 seats

Elections
- House of Lords voting system: Ennoblement by the Sovereign or inheritance of a British peerage or English peerage; Receiving a writ of acceleration (as heir apparent to a father who held two or more peerages); Appointment to an English or Welsh see; Election as a Scottish representative peer
- House of Commons voting system: First-past-the-post with limited suffrage

Meeting place
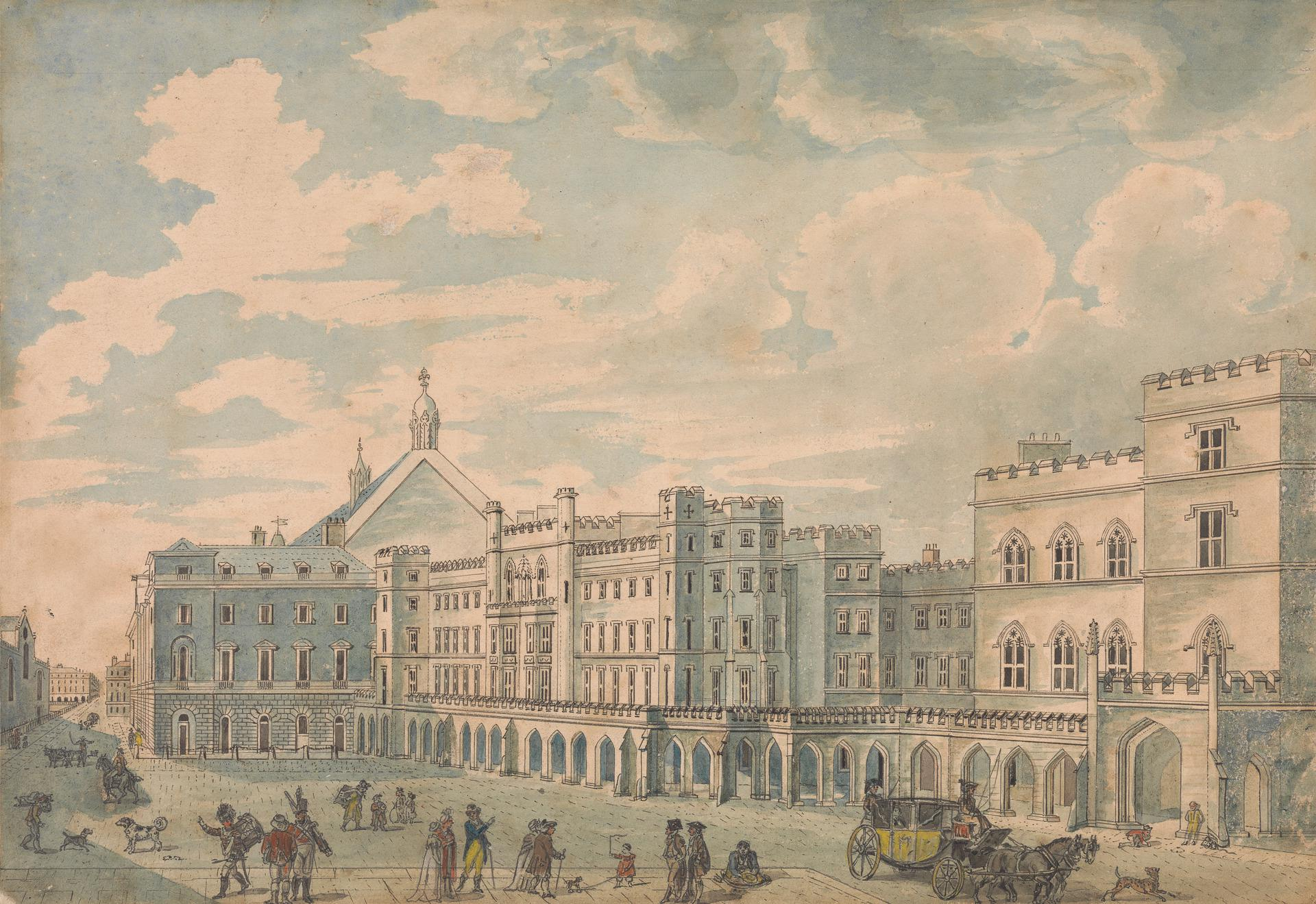
- Palace of Westminster, London

Footnotes
- See also: Parliament of Ireland

The Parliament of Great Britain was formed in May 1707 following the ratification of the Acts of Union by both the Parliament of England and the Parliament of Scotland. The Acts ratified the treaty of Union which created a new unified Kingdom of Great Britain and created the parliament of Great Britain located in the former home of the English parliament in the Palace of Westminster, near the City of London. This lasted nearly a century, until the Acts of Union 1800 merged the separate British and Irish Parliaments into a single Parliament of the United Kingdom with effect from 1 January 1801.

== History ==
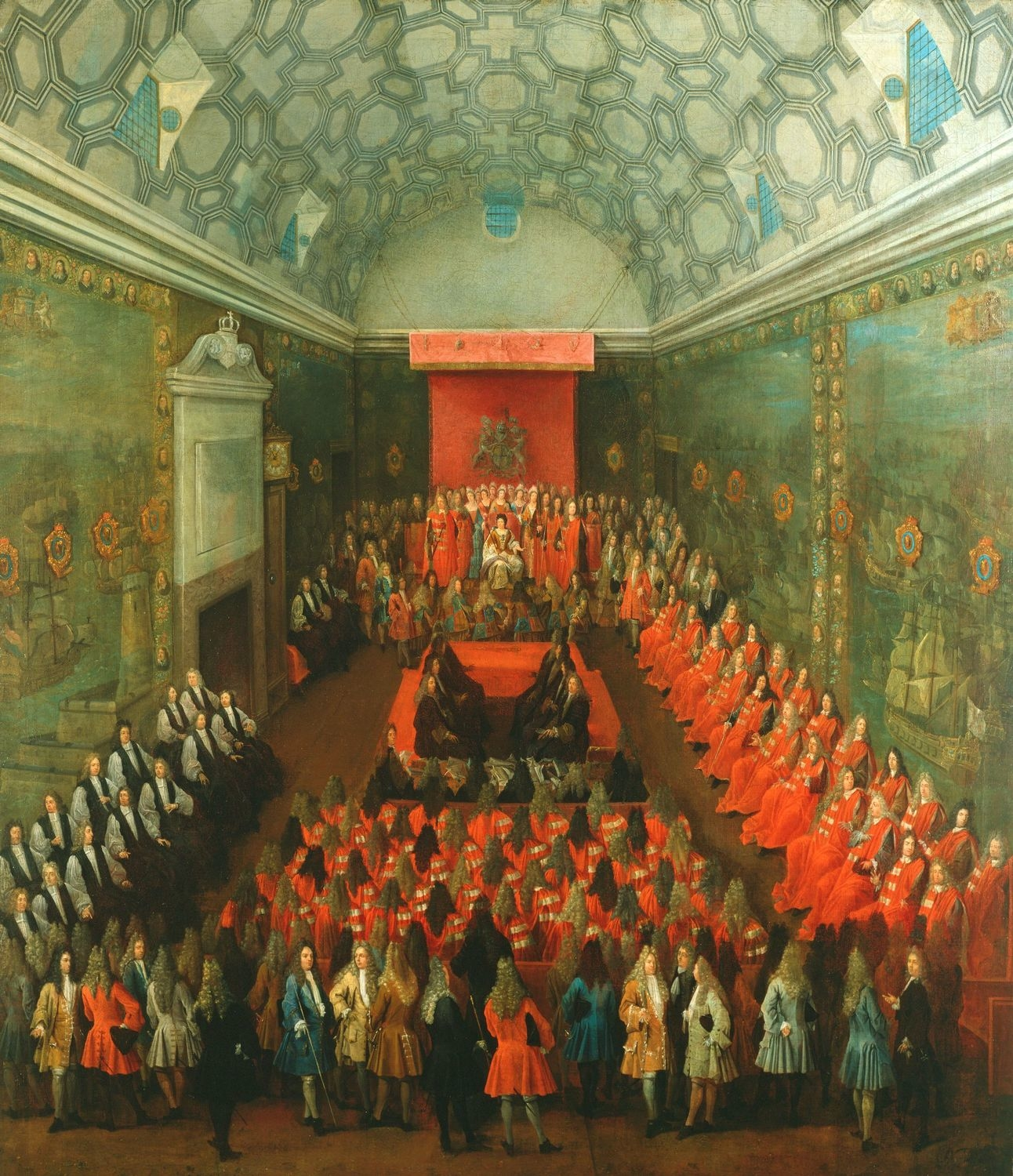
Painting of c. 1708–14 showing Queen Anne addressing the House of Lords in the old Palace of Westminster, depicting the ceremonial union of crown and parliament after the Acts of Union 1707

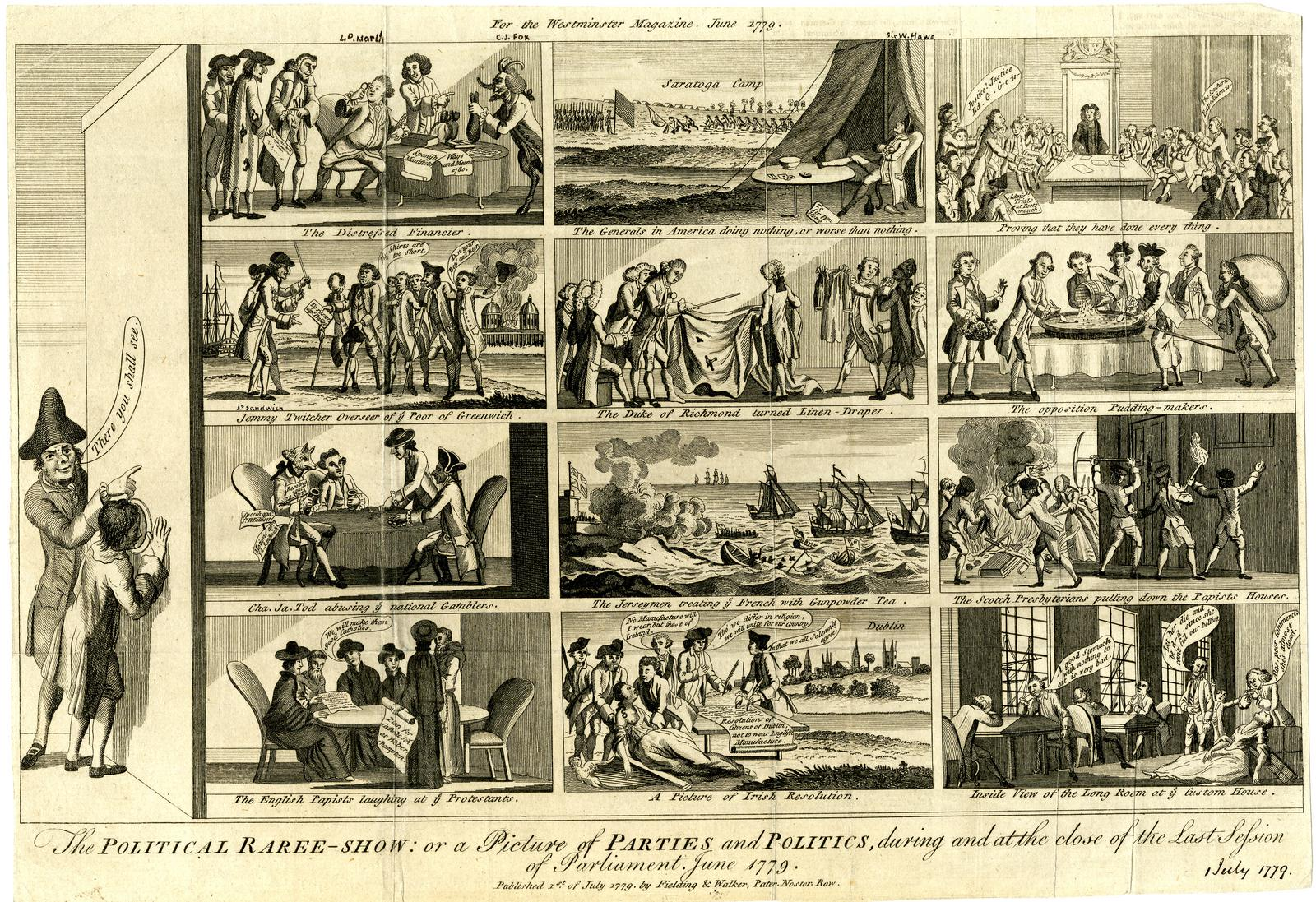
The political raree-show: or a picture of parties and politics, during and at the close of the last session of Parliament, June 1779 (1779 etching)

Following the Treaty of Union in 1706, Acts of Union ratifying the Treaty were passed in both the Parliament of England and the Parliament of Scotland, which created a new Kingdom of Great Britain. The Acts paved the way for the enactment of the treaty of Union which created a new parliament, referred to as the 'Parliament of Great Britain', based in the home of the former English parliament. All of the traditions, procedures, and standing orders of the English parliament were retained, although there is no provision for this within the treaty; furthermore, the incumbent officers and members representing England comprised the overwhelming majority of the new body. It was not even considered necessary to hold a new general election. While Scots law and Scottish legislation remained separate, new legislation was thereafter to be enacted by the new parliament, with the exception of that pertaining to private right which could only be legislated on for the "evident utility" of the people. England's de facto prominence in the new parliament was, and remains, a contentious issue.

After the Hanoverian King George I ascended the British throne in 1714 through the Act of Settlement of 1701, real power continued to shift away from the monarchy. George was a German ruler, spoke poor English, and remained interested in governing his dominions in continental Europe rather than in Britain. He thus entrusted power to a group of his ministers, the foremost of whom was Sir Robert Walpole, and by the end of his reign in 1727 the position of the ministers – who had to rely on Parliament for support – was cemented. George I's successor, his son George II, continued to follow through with his father's domestic policies and made little effort to re-establish monarchical control over the government which was now in firm control by Parliament. By the end of the 18th century the monarch still had considerable influence over Parliament, which was dominated by the English aristocracy, by means of patronage, but had ceased to exert direct power: for instance, the last occasion on which royal assent was withheld was in 1708 by Queen Anne, even this being done only at the request of her ministers. At general elections the vote was restricted to freeholders and landowners, in constituencies that had changed little since the Middle Ages, so that in many "rotten" and "pocket" boroughs seats could be bought, while major cities remained unrepresented, except by the Knights of the Shire representing whole counties. Reformers and Radicals sought parliamentary reform, but as the French Revolutionary Wars developed the British government became repressive against dissent and progress towards reform was stalled.

George II's successor, George III, sought to restore royal supremacy and absolute monarchy, but by the end of his reign the position of the king's ministers – who discovered that they needed the support of Parliament to enact any major changes – had become central to the role of British governance, and would remain so ever after.

During the first half of George III's reign, the monarch still had considerable influence over Parliament, which itself was dominated by the patronage and influence of the English nobility. Most candidates for the House of Commons were identified as Whigs or Tories, but once elected they formed shifting coalitions of interests rather than dividing along clear party lines. At general elections the vote was restricted in most places to property owners, in constituencies which were out of date and did not reflect the growing importance of manufacturing towns or shifts of population, so that in the rotten and pocket boroughs seats in parliament could be bought from the rich landowners who controlled them, while major cities remained unrepresented. Reformers like William Beckford and Radicals beginning with John Wilkes called for reform of the system. In 1780, a draft programme of reform was drawn up by Charles James Fox and Thomas Brand Hollis and put forward by a sub-committee of the electors of Westminster. This included calls for the six points later adopted by the Chartists.

The American War of Independence ended in defeat for a foreign policy that sought to prevent the thirteen American colonies from breaking away and forming their own independent nation, something which George III had fervently advocated, and in March 1782 the king was forced to appoint an administration led by his opponents which sought to curb royal patronage. In November 1783, he took the opportunity to use his influence in the House of Lords to defeat a bill to reform the Honourable East India Company, dismissed the government of the day, and appointed William Pitt the Younger to form a new government. Pitt had previously called for Parliament to begin to reform itself, but he did not press for long for reforms the king did not like. Proposals Pitt made in April 1785 to redistribute seats from the "rotten boroughs" to London and the counties were defeated in the House of Commons by 248 votes to 174.

In the wake of the French Revolution of 1789, Radical organisations such as the London Corresponding Society sprang up to press for parliamentary reform, but as the French Revolutionary Wars developed the government took extensive repressive measures against feared domestic unrest aping the democratic and egalitarian ideals of the French Revolution and progress toward reform was stalled for decades.

=== Parliament of the United Kingdom ===
In 1801, the Parliament of the United Kingdom was created when the Kingdom of Great Britain was united with the Kingdom of Ireland to become the United Kingdom of Great Britain and Ireland under the Acts of Union 1800.

== Membership by constituent country and type of seat, in 1801 ==
=== House of Commons ===
Monmouthshire (One County constituency with two members and one single member Borough constituency) is included in Wales in these tables. Sources for this period may include the county in England.

Table 1: Constituencies and Members, by type and country, in 1801

Country	BC	CC	UC	Total C	BMP	CMP	UMP	Total Members	Population (1801)	People per MP (1801)
England	202	39	2	243	404	78	4	486	8,350,859	~17,182
Wales	13	13	0	26	13	14	0	27	541,677	~20,062
Scotland	15	30	0	45	15	30	0	45	1,608,420	~35,724
Total	230	82	2	314	432	122	4	558	10.5 million	~18,819

Table 2: Number of seats per constituency, by type and country, in 1801

Country	BC×1	BC×2	BC×4	CC×1	CC×2	UC×2	Total C
England	4	196	2	0	39	2	243
Wales	13	0	0	12	1	0	26
Scotland	15	0	0	30	0	0	45
Total	32	196	2	42	40	2	314

=== House of Lords ===
Country	Lords Temporal			Lords Spiritual	Total Peers
Country	PE	PGB	SRP	Lords Spiritual	Total Peers
England	119	108	—N/a	22	269
Wales	119	108	—N/a	4	269
Scotland	—N/a	108	16	—N/a	269
Total	243			26	269

Distinguishing English from Welsh or Scottish lords is difficult as they did not represent a region or constituency: some had territorial designations in one country but principal residence or estates in another, like the Earl of Pembroke and Montgomery, whose titles referred to Welsh places but who lived at Wilton House in England, or Lord Cawdor, who was Scottish but owned land and lived in Wales. All members of the pre-1707 Peerage of England (which also included Welsh titles) and the post-1707 Peerage of Great Britain (which had lords from all over Britain) could sit in the Lords. Also with them were the bishops of the Church of England, with four Welsh sees.

The pre-1707 Peerage of Scotland elected 16 members from among their number, who sat in the Lords as representative peers.

The exact numbers in the Lords could vary, as sometimes a peer would die without an heir and his title would become extinct; sometimes a title would be inherited by a minor, who would not be allowed to sit until he turned twenty-one years of age; an heir apparent could enter the Lords during his father's lifetime via a writ of acceleration if his father held two peerages; and the monarch could create new peers (in the Peerage of Great Britain) at any time. This table gives numbers as of 1799.

== See also ==
- List of acts of the Parliament of Great Britain
- List of parliaments of Great Britain
  - First Parliament of Great Britain
- List of speakers of the British House of Commons
- Parliament of Ireland
- Members of the Parliament of Great Britain

== Sources ==
- Cowan, D. (2024). "Pittite Triumph and Whig Failure in the Cambridge University Constituency, 1780–96". Parliamentary History. 43 (1). doi:10.1111/1750-0206.12724.
- Fleming, Thomas (2007). The Perils of Peace: America's Struggle for Survival After Yorktown. New York: Collins. ISBN 978-0060501235.

Parliament of Great Britain
Preceded by Parliament of England c. 1215–1707; Parliament of Scotland c. 1235–1707	Parliament of Great Britain; 1707–1800	Succeeded by Parliament of the United Kingdom of Great Britain and Ireland; 1801–1927; Parliament of the United Kingdom of Great Britain and Northern Ireland; 1927–present
