= 1839 Speaker of the British House of Commons election =

← 1835	27 May 1839	1895 →
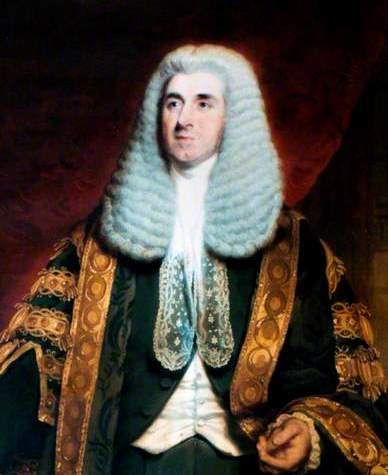

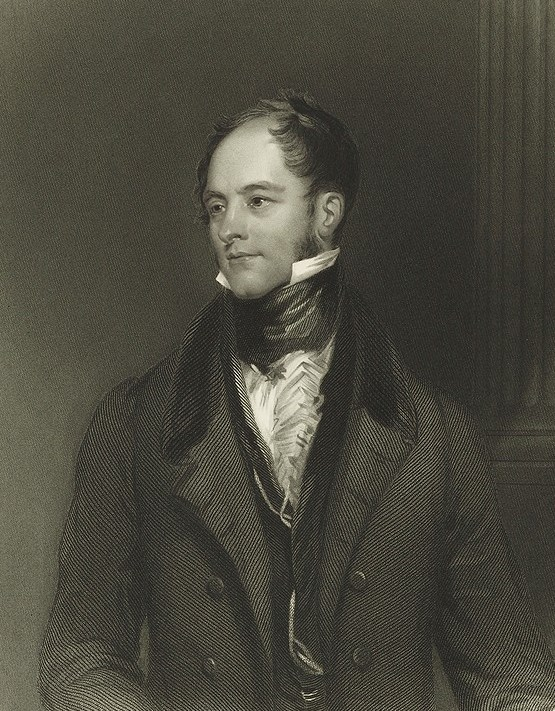
Candidate	Charles Shaw-Lefevre	Henry Goulburn
Party	Whig	Tory
Popular vote	317	299
Percentage	51.5%	48.5%
Candidate's seat	North Hampshire	Cambridge University
Speaker before election
James Abercromby
Elected Speaker
Charles Shaw-Lefevre

The 1839 election of the Speaker of the House of Commons occurred on 27 May 1839. James Abercromby had retired due to failing health. The next day he was raised to the peerage as Baron Dunfermline.

Charles Shaw-Lefevre was proposed by Henry Handley and seconded by Stephen Lushington.

Henry Goulburn was proposed by Sir Watkin Williams-Wynn and seconded by John Wilson-Patten.

Both candidates addressed the House.

On the motion that Shaw-Lefevre take the Chair, he was elected by 317 votes to 299, a majority of 18.
