= 1992 Speaker of the British House of Commons election =

- 27 April 1992
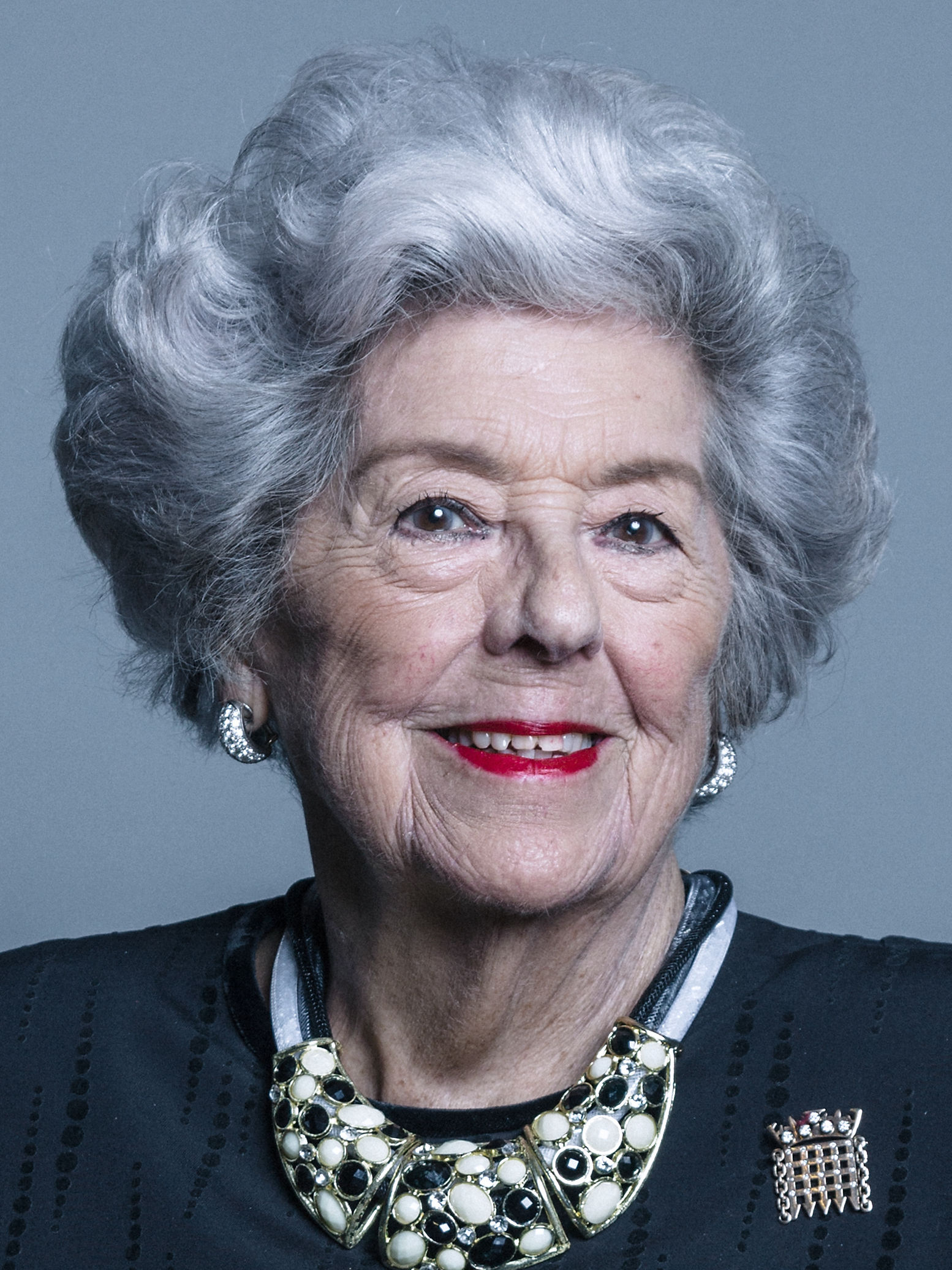
Candidate	Betty Boothroyd	Peter Brooke
Party	Labour	Conservative
Constituency	West Bromwich West	City of London and Westminster South
Members' vote	372	238
Percentage	61.0%	39.0%
Speaker before election
Bernard Weatherill
Conservative
Elected Speaker
Betty Boothroyd
Labour

The 1992 election of the Speaker of the House of Commons occurred on 27 April 1992, in the first sitting of the House of Commons following the 1992 general election and the retirement of the previous Speaker Bernard Weatherill. The election resulted in the election of Labour MP Betty Boothroyd, one of Weatherill's deputies, who was the first woman to become Speaker. This was at a time when the Conservative Party had a majority in the House of Commons. It was also the first contested election (with more than one willing nominee) since William Morrison defeated Major James Milner on 31 October 1951, although Geoffrey de Freitas had been nominated against his wishes in the 1971 election.

== Candidates ==
The candidates were Betty Boothroyd (Labour), MP for West Bromwich West and Deputy Speaker of the House of Commons from 1987 to 1992, and Peter Brooke (Conservative), MP for City of London and Westminster South and Secretary of State for Northern Ireland from 1989 to 1992.

== Election ==
The election was presided over by the Father of the House, the Father of the House being former Prime Minister Sir Edward Heath, and was conducted by means of a conventional parliamentary motion, originally to elect Peter Brooke. He was proposed and seconded by Conservative MPs Sir Michael Neubert and Sir Tom Arnold respectively.

When Brooke had made his own speech submitting his candidacy, Conservative MP John Biffen moved an amendment to the original motion to elect Betty Boothroyd, who was then seconded by Labour MP Gwyneth Dunwoody. Boothroyd then gave her own speech submitting her candidacy.

== Results ==
MPs then voted on the amendment to the original motion, that Betty Boothroyd take the Chair as Speaker, which was approved by 372 votes to 238. Boothroyd was thus conducted to the Speaker's Chair by Biffen and Dunwoody, to unprecedented scenes of spontaneous and sustained applause. Clapping was and remains disorderly in the House of Commons, but it has since been tolerated in subsequent elections of Speaker.
