= 1802 Speaker of the British House of Commons election =

- 10 February 1802
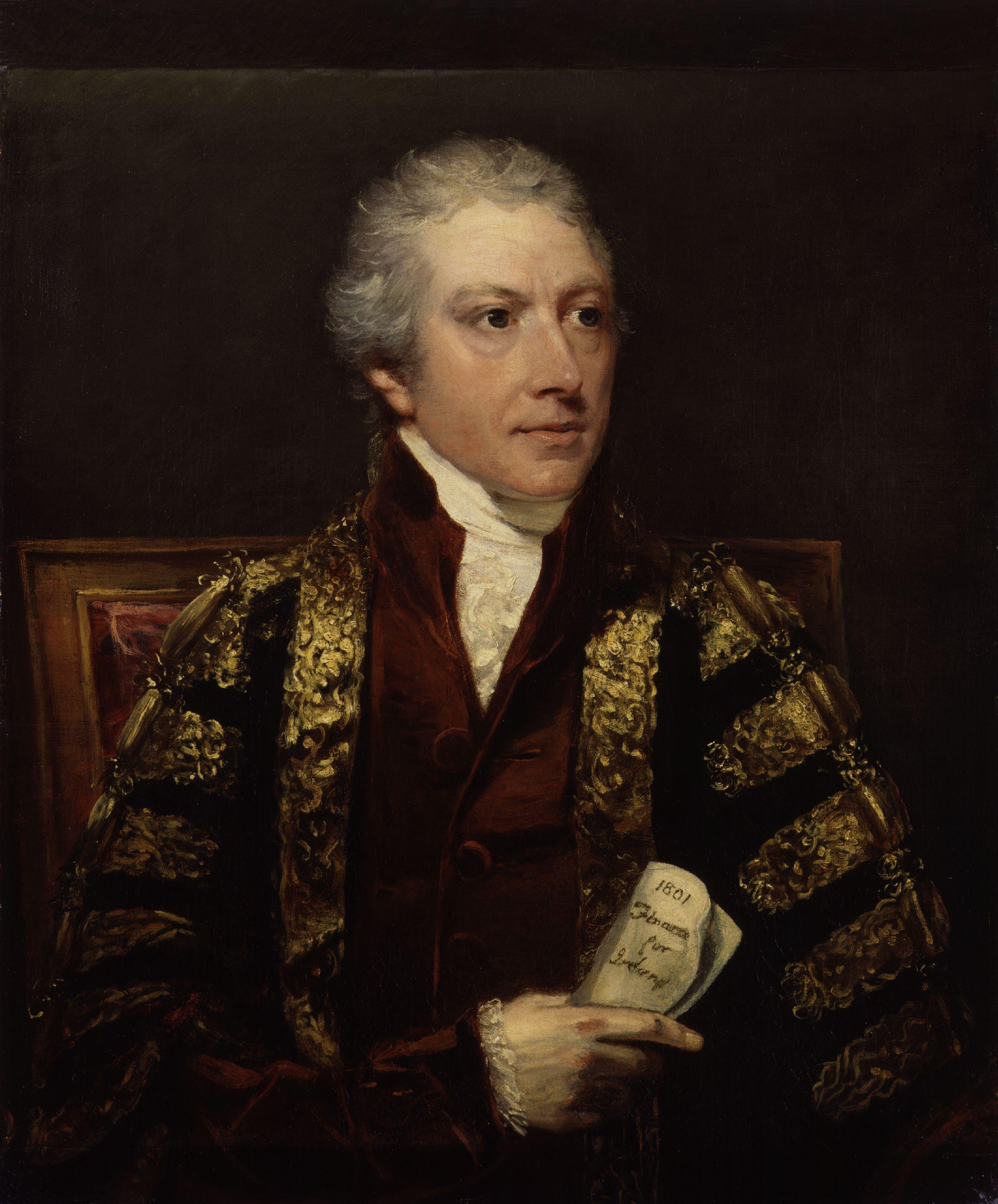

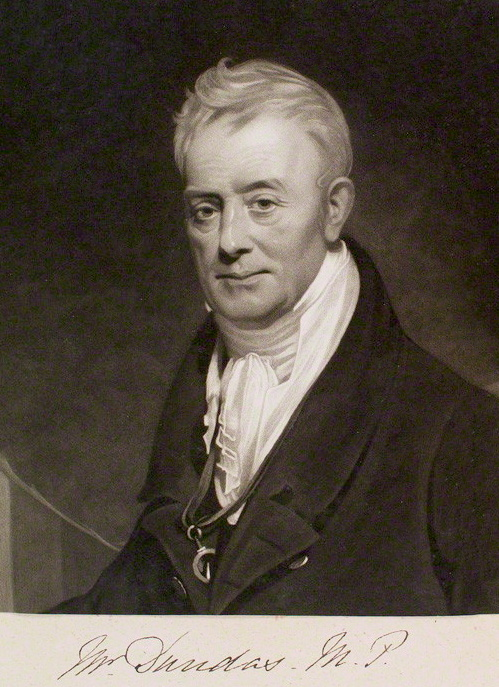
Candidate	Charles Abbot	Charles Dundas
Popular vote	unanimous	withdrew
Candidate's seat	Helston	Berkshire
Speaker before election
Sir John Mitford
Elected Speaker
Charles Abbot

The 1802 election of the Speaker of the House of Commons occurred on 10 February 1802.

The incumbent Speaker Sir John Mitford had resigned to take office as Lord Chancellor of Ireland.

Charles Abbot was proposed by Sir William Grant, Master of the Rolls, and seconded by William Baker.

Despite having no personal opposition to Abbot, Richard Brinsley Sheridan objected to the government's practice of nominating its officials to the speakership, believing that the Commons should make the choice for itself. He proposed Charles Dundas. Lord George Cavendish seconded.

Abbot submitted to the will of the House. Dundas sought to decline the office, and requested that Sheridan withdraw the nomination.

On the motion "That the Right Hon. Charles Abbot do take the Chair of this House as Speaker," Abbot was elected unanimously.
