= 1770 Speaker of the British House of Commons election =

- 22 January 1770
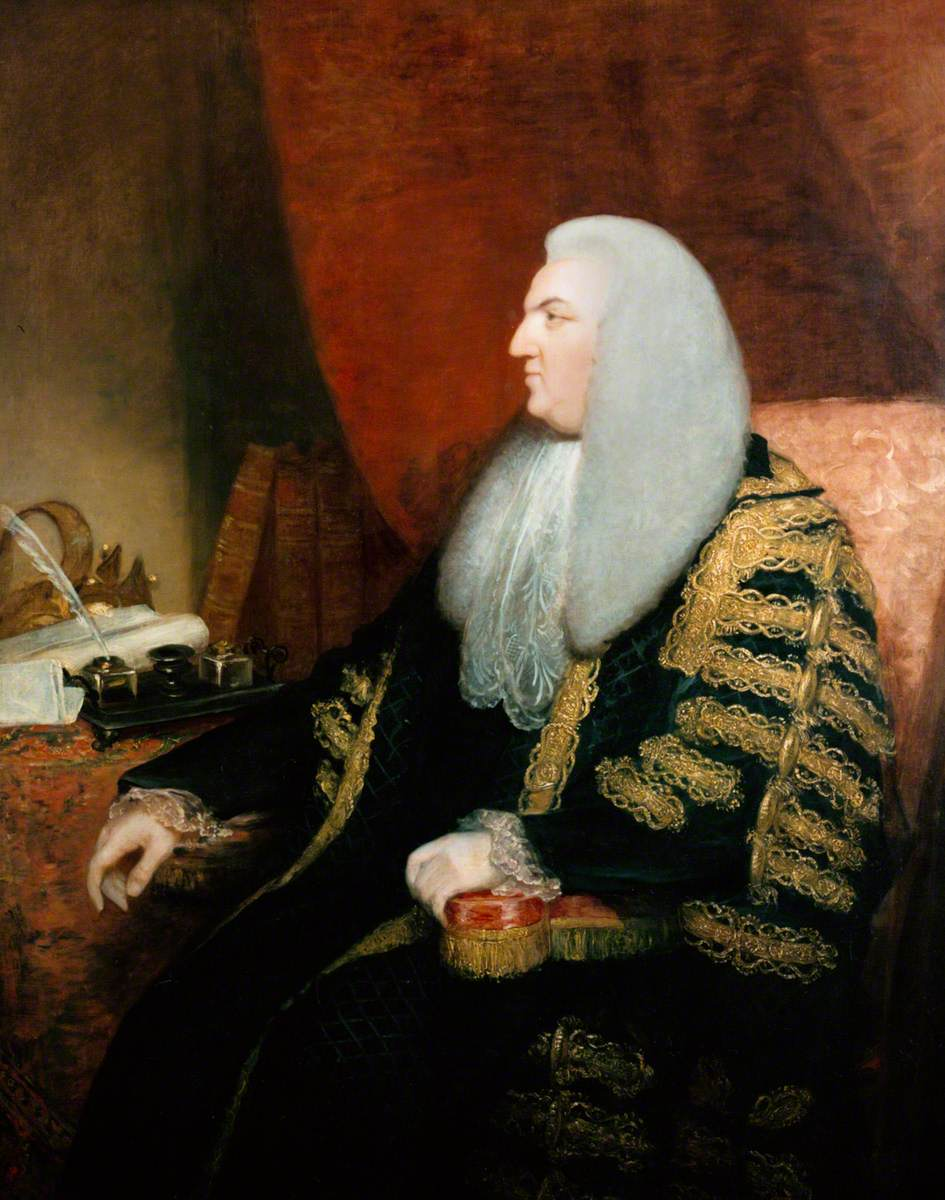

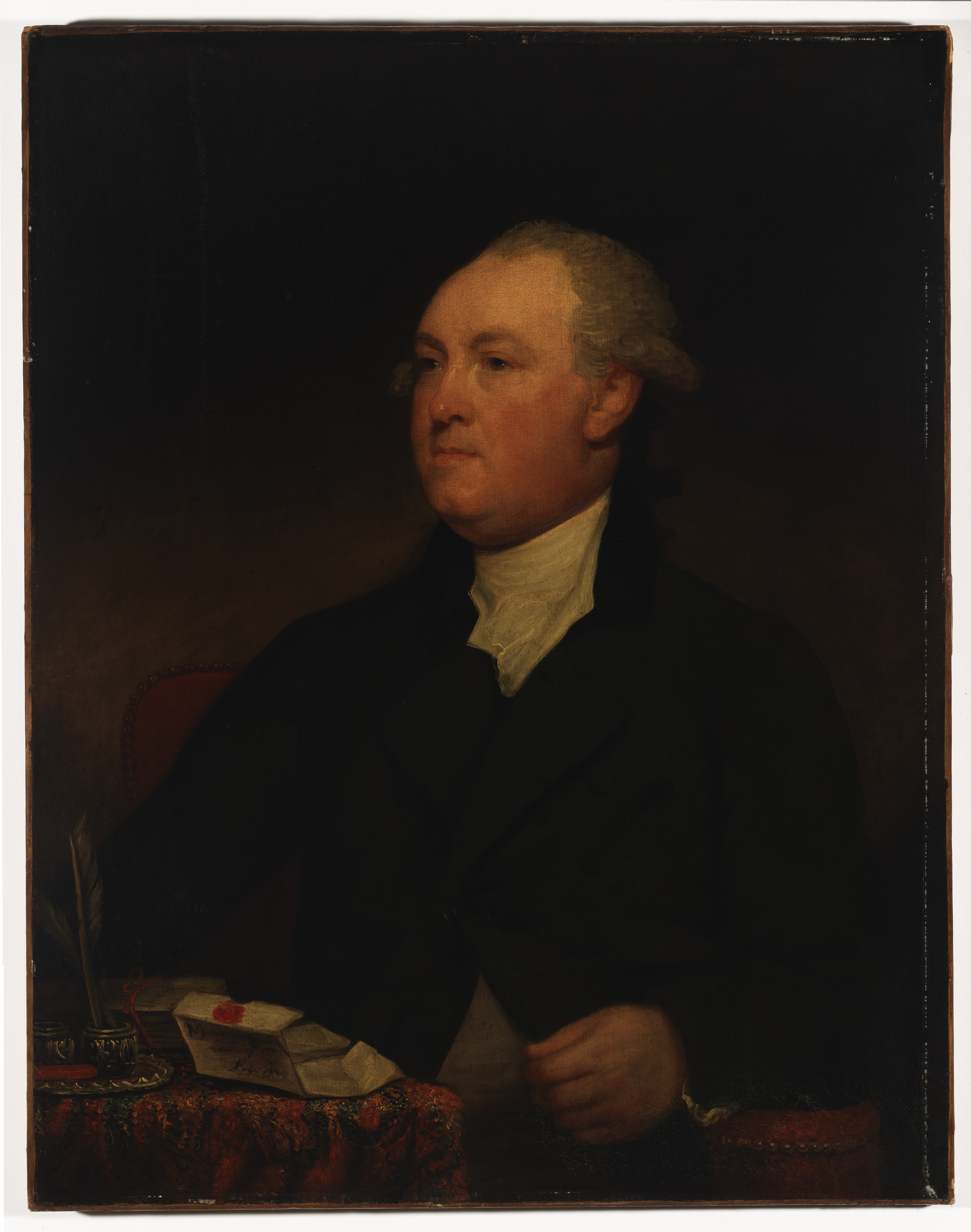
Candidate	Sir Fletcher Norton	Thomas Townshend
Popular vote	237	121
Percentage	66.2%	33.8%
Candidate's seat	Guildford	Whitchurch
Speaker before election
Sir John Cust
Elected Speaker
Sir Fletcher Norton

The 1770 election of the Speaker of the House of Commons occurred on 22 January 1770.

The election followed the resignation of incumbent Speaker Sir John Cust due to ill health. Cust died two days after this election.

Sir Fletcher Norton was proposed by Lord North and seconded by Richard Rigby.

Thomas Townshend was proposed by Lord John Cavendish and seconded by Lord George Sackville.

Both candidates addressed the House. Townshend stated, as Cavendish had, that he had been proposed without his knowledge. A debate followed, with Edmund Burke supporting Townshend.

On the motion "That the Right Hon. Sir Fletcher Norton do take the Chair of this House as Speaker," Norton was elected by 237 votes to 121 (the votes against given as 124 in some sources).
