= Speaker's Committee on the Electoral Commission =

British parliamentary committee

The Speaker's Committee on the Electoral Commission (SCEC), or simply the Speaker's Committee, is a body created under the Political Parties, Elections and Referendums Act 2000 to scrutinise the Electoral Commission. Through the committee's members, the commission is able to field questions in the House of Commons in a manner similar to the way ministers do.

== Composition ==
The committee comprises nine MPs: the speaker of the House of Commons (who also serves as its chair), the Secretary of State for Levelling Up, Housing and Communities, the chair of the select committee responsible for electoral issues, As of 25 September 2026, the members of the committee are as follows:

Member	Party	Role
Lindsay Hoyle	Speaker (Labour)	Speaker of the House of Commons (ex officio member)
Angela Rayner	Labour	Minister of the Crown with responsibilities in relation to local government (Appointed by the Prime Minister)
Abena Oppong-Asare	Labour	Chair of local governments committee
Simon Hoar	Conservative	Regular Member
Sir Jeremy Wright	Conservative	Regular Member
Lisa Smart	Liberal Democrat	Regular Member

== See also ==
- Parliamentary committees of the United Kingdom
