= Thomas Davies (Conservative politician) =

British politician

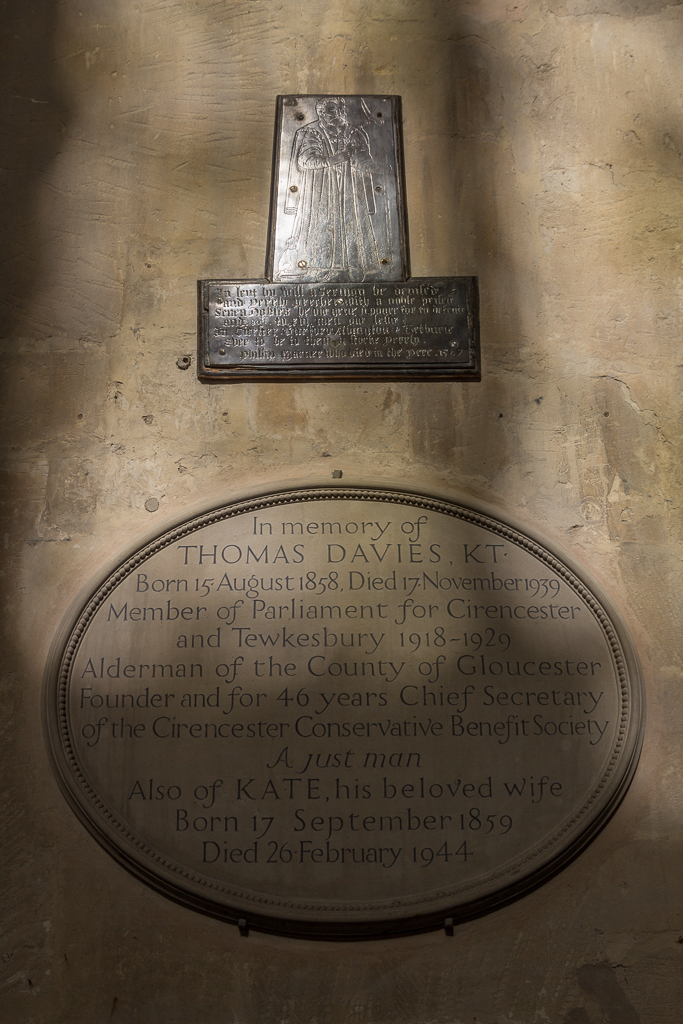
Memorial to Sir Thomas Davies and his wife in St John the Baptist Church, Cirencester

Sir Thomas Davies (15 August 1858 – 17 November 1939) was a British Conservative Party politician. He was the member of parliament (MP) for the Cirencester and Tewkesbury division of Gloucestershire from 1918 to 1929.

Davies was the son of William Davies of St Hilary, Cowbridge, Glamorgan, and was educated privately. He was married in 1881 to Kate Vokes, the daughter of William Vokes, from Cardiff. The couple had two sons and two daughters. Their second son was the historian of seventeenth-century England, Godfrey Davies.

From 1899 to 1910 he was a member of Gloucestershire County Council for Campden, and was listed in 1922 an Alderman of the Council and Chairman of Cirencester War Pension Committee. He was at some point the agent for Gloucestershire Conservative Association.

He was elected at the 1918 general election as MP for Cirencester and Tewkesbury, standing as a Coalition Unionist (i.e. a supporter of the Conservative-dominated coalition government led by the Liberal David Lloyd George). He was re-elected at the next three general elections, and retired from the House of Commons at the 1929 general election.

He was knighted in 1924.

Parliament of the United Kingdom
New constituency	Member of Parliament for Cirencester & Tewkesbury; 1918 – 1929	Succeeded by William Morrison
