= William Morrison, 1st Viscount Dunrossil =

British politician (1893–1961)

The Right Honourable The Viscount Dunrossil GCMG MC PC QC
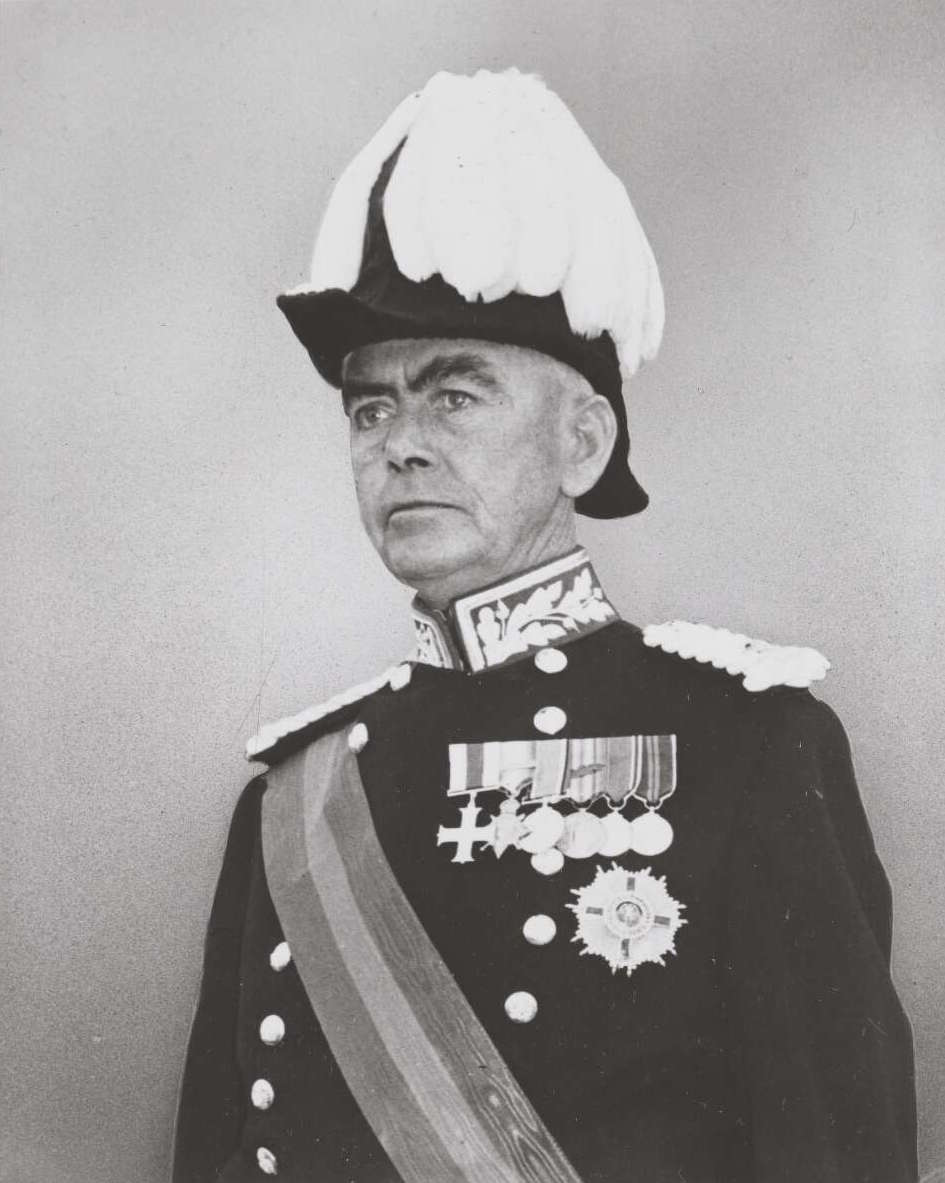
- Morrison in 1960

14th Governor-General of Australia
- In office 2 February 1960 – 3 February 1961
- Monarch: Elizabeth II
- Prime Minister: Robert Menzies
- Preceded by: Sir William Slim
- Succeeded by: Lord De L'Isle

Speaker of the House of Commons of the United Kingdom
- In office 31 October 1951 – 20 October 1959
- Monarchs: George VI; Elizabeth II
- Prime Minister: Winston Churchill; Anthony Eden; Harold Macmillan
- Preceded by: Douglas Clifton Brown
- Succeeded by: Sir Harry Hylton-Foster
Ministerial positions
Postmaster General
In office 3 April 1940 – 7 February 1943
Monarch	George VI
Prime Minister	Neville Chamberlain; Winston Churchill
Preceded by	George Tryon
Succeeded by	Harry Crookshank
Chancellor of the Duchy of Lancaster
In office 29 January 1939 – 3 April 1940
Monarch	George VI
Prime Minister	Neville Chamberlain
Preceded by	The Earl Winterton
Succeeded by	George Tryon
Minister of Food
In office 4 September 1939 – 3 April 1940
Monarch	George VI
Prime Minister	Neville Chamberlain
Preceded by	Office Established; Charles McCurdy as Minister of Food Control, 1921
Succeeded by	The Lord Woolton
Minister of Agriculture, Fisheries and Food
In office 29 October 1936 – 29 January 1939
Monarchs	Edward VIII; George VI
Prime Minister	Stanley Baldwin; Neville Chamberlain
Preceded by	Walter Elliot
Succeeded by	Sir Reginald Dorman-Smith
Constituency
Member of Parliament for Cirencester and Tewkesbury
In office 30 May 1929 – 18 September 1959
Preceded by	Thomas Davies
Succeeded by	Nicholas Ridley

Personal details
- Born: 10 August 1893 Torinturk Farm, Argyll, Scotland
- Died: 3 February 1961 (aged 67) Canberra, Australia
- Resting place: St John the Baptist Church, Reid
- Party: Conservative
- Spouse: Allison Swan (m. 1924)
- Children: Four, including John
- Education: University of Edinburgh

William Shepherd Morrison, 1st Viscount Dunrossil (10 August 1893 – 3 February 1961), was a British politician. He was a long-serving cabinet minister before serving as Speaker of the House of Commons from 1951 to 1959. He was then appointed as the 14th governor-general of Australia, in office from 1960 until his death in 1961.

Morrison was the son of a Scottish farmer, born at Torinturk farm by Loch Nell near Oban, Argyll. He attended George Watson's College and then went on to the University of Edinburgh; his studies were interrupted by World War I, where he served with the Royal Field Artillery and won the Military Cross. Training as a lawyer, Morrison was called to the bar in 1923 and began working as a private secretary to Sir Thomas Inskip, the Solicitor-General. After several previous attempts, he was elected to the House of Commons in 1929, representing a constituency in Gloucestershire for the Conservative Party.

In 1936, after several years as a junior minister, Morrison was made Minister of Agriculture and Fisheries by Stanley Baldwin. He also served as a minister under Neville Chamberlain and Winston Churchill, including as Minister of Food (1939–1940), Postmaster General (1940–1943), and Minister of Town and Country Planning (1943–1945). Morrison was elevated to the speakership following the 1951 general election. He was praised for his impartiality, especially during the heated debate on the Suez Crisis, and was raised to the viscountcy when his term ended. Lord Dunrossil became governor-general in 1960, on the nomination of Robert Menzies, but served only a year before dying in office.

== Early life and career ==
Morrison was born at Torinturk farm by Loch Nell near Oban, Argyll, Scotland, the son of Marion (née McVicar) and John Morrison. His father was a farmer who had previously spent time working in South Africa's diamond industry. Morrison was educated at George Watson's College and the University of Edinburgh. He joined the British Army as an officer in the First World War and served with an artillery regiment in France, where he won the Military Cross. In 1919 he left the Army with the rank of captain. He married Katharine Swan in 1924, with whom he had four sons.

Morrison was called to the English bar at the Inner Temple in 1923 and worked as private secretary to Sir Thomas Inskip, the Solicitor-General. He became a King's Counsel in 1934 and Recorder of Walsall in 1935.

== Political career ==
Morrison was elected to the House of Commons as Conservative Member of Parliament (MP) for Cirencester and Tewkesbury in 1929. In Parliament he was known as "Shakes", a nickname given him at Edinburgh when he was elected the University Bard for his Gaelic poetry and which stuck because of his prodigious memory for Shakespeare.

=== Government minister ===
Morrison had a long ministerial career under four Prime Ministers (Ramsay MacDonald, Stanley Baldwin, Neville Chamberlain and Winston Churchill). He was:

- Parliamentary Secretary to the Attorney-General 1931–35,
- Financial Secretary to the Treasury 1935–36,
- Minister of Agriculture and Fisheries 1936–39,
- Minister of Food 1939–40,
- Postmaster-General 1940–43
- Minister of Town and Country Planning 1943–45.

Morrison was referred to in the book Guilty Men by Michael Foot, Frank Owen and Peter Howard (writing under the pseudonym 'Cato'), published in 1940 as an attack on public figures for their failure to re-arm and their appeasement of Nazi Germany. However, as noted in the diaries of Chips Channon, he was part of the Insurgents, the faction of the Conservative party that worked in secret against appeasement, to oust Chamberlain and replace him with Churchill ahead of the war.

Campaigning during the general election of 1945, Morrison attacked Socialism and claimed that Hitler and Mussolini began as Socialists. He further claimed that although Labour objected to the Conservatives calling themselves 'National', the Conservatives had no objection in their opponents labelling themselves National-Socialists. In 1947 he attacked identity cards which had been introduced during the war because he believed they were a nuisance to law-abiding people and also because the cards were ineffective.

=== Speaker of the House of Commons ===
In 1951, when the Conservatives returned to power, Morrison was elected Speaker of the House of Commons. He was opposed by Labour MP Major James Milner, who said it was his party's turn to have a Speaker of the House. It was the first contested election for the post in the twentieth century. Morrison was elected in a vote on party lines.

== Governor-General of Australia ==
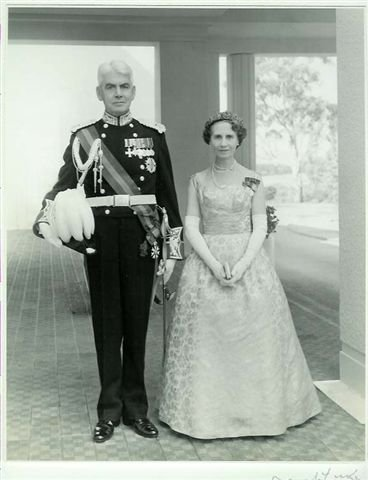
Dunrossil and his wife in Canberra, 1960

Morrison held the post of Speaker until 1959, when he announced that he would not be contesting the forthcoming general election but retiring for reasons of health. As was customary for former Speakers, he was made a viscount, taking the title Viscount Dunrossil, of Vallaquie in the Isle of North Uist and County of Inverness.

Given his health, it surprised many when it was announced shortly thereafter that he had been chosen to succeed Sir William Slim as Governor-General of Australia, leading to 155 MPs voting against the customary bill granting him the traditional pension of £4,000 per annum. He was also appointed a Knight Grand Cross of the Order of St Michael and St George (GCMG) that year. By this time support for the idea of British governors-general was declining in Australia, but the Liberal Prime Minister, Robert Menzies, was determined to maintain the British link (and, in particular, the Scottish link).

Dunrossil took office on 2 February 1960. He was the first governor-general since Sir Isaac Isaacs (1931–1936) to wear the full ceremonial vice-regal uniform, but despite this was known for having a more relaxed approach than his predecessor. Dunrossil suffered from ill health while in office, and his wife frequently deputised for him at ceremonial events. He suffered a pulmonary embolism on the morning of 3 February 1961, becoming the first and only governor-general to die in office. He was granted a state funeral, and buried at St John the Baptist Church, Reid. His Official Secretary throughout his term was Murray Tyrrell.

Dunrossil was succeeded in the viscountcy by his son, John Morrison, 2nd Viscount Dunrossil, who was a career officer in the Foreign & Commonwealth Office, holding several senior diplomatic appointments, including serving as Governor of Bermuda. He was proud to wear his father's vice-regal hat on formal occasions on the island colony.

== Honours, decorations and arms ==

Knight Grand Cross of the Order of St Michael and St George (GCMG)	1959
Military Cross (MC)	1915
Knight of the Order of St John (KStJ)	1960
1914-15 Star	
British War Medal	
Victory Medal	with palm for Mentioned in Dispatches
King George V Silver Jubilee Medal	1935
King George VI Coronation Medal	1937
Queen Elizabeth II Coronation Medal	1953

Morrison was unusual in having separate, and entirely different, grants of arms from both the College of Arms in England and the Lyon Court in Scotland.

Coat of arms of William Morrison, 1st Viscount Dunrossil (except Scotland)
Notes Earl Marshal’s Warrant 14 July 1952, Granted 14 August 1953. Agent Richmond Herald. Grants: 115 / 188. Crest A Viking galley with one mast and sail furled proper flying from the masthead a pennon Argent charged with a raven volant Sable. Escutcheon Azure on a Pale Ermine between two Gannets reversed volant to the dexter their wings expanded palewise proper a representation of the Mace of the House of Commons Or. Motto An Tighnearna Mo Bhuachaille (The Lord is my Shepherd)

Coat of arms of William Morrison, 1st Viscount Dunrossil (in Scotland)
Notes Petition to Lord Lyon 17 December 1959, matriculated 18 April 1960. (College of Arms: Scotland IV 143). Coronet Coronet of a Viscount Crest Issuant from waves of the Sea Azure crested Argent a Mount Vert thereon an embattled Wall Azure masoned Argent charged with a Portcullis Or and issuant therefrom a Cubit Arm naked proper the hand grasping a Dagger Azure hilted Or Escutcheon Per bend sinister Gules and Argent a Demi-Lion rampant issuant Or armed and langued Azure holding in his paws a Battleaxe the Shaft curved of the third and the Axehead of the fourth in chief and in base issuant from the Sea undy Vert and Or a Tower Sable Windows and Port Or over all a Bend sinister embattled Azure charged with an Open Crown Or jewelled Gules between two Fleurs-de-lys Argent; within a Bordure Vert for difference. Supporters On either side a Lion regardant Or armed and langued Gules collared Vert supporting between the exterior forepaw and interior hindpaw a Battleaxe Azure the shaft embowed Motto Above the Crest: Teaghlach Phabbay (The household or family of Phabbay); Below the Shield: An Tighnearna Mo Bhuachaille (The Lord is my Shepherd)

== Notes ==
Parliament of the United Kingdom
Preceded by Sir Thomas Davies	Member of Parliament for Cirencester and Tewkesbury; 1929–1959	Succeeded by Nicholas Ridley
Preceded by Douglas Clifton Brown	Speaker of the House of Commons of the United Kingdom; 1951–1959	Succeeded by Sir Harry Hylton-Foster
Political offices
Preceded by Alfred Duff Cooper	Financial Secretary to the Treasury; 1935–1936	Succeeded by John Colville
Preceded by Walter Elliot	Minister of Agriculture and Fisheries; 1936–1939	Succeeded by Sir Reginald Dorman-Smith
New title	Minister of Food; 1939–1940	Succeeded by The Lord Woolton
Preceded by The Earl Winterton	Chancellor of the Duchy of Lancaster; 1939–1940	Succeeded by George Tryon
Preceded by George Tryon	Postmaster General; 1940–1942	Succeeded by Harry Crookshank
Government offices
Preceded by Sir William Slim	Governor-General of Australia; 1960–1961	Succeeded by The Viscount De L'Isle
Peerage of the United Kingdom
New creation	Viscount Dunrossil; 1959–1961	Succeeded by John Morrison
