= 1951 Speaker of the British House of Commons election =

- 31 October 1951
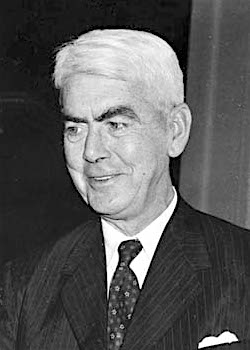
Candidate	William Morrison	Maj. James Milner
Party	Conservative	Labour
Popular vote	318	251
Percentage	55.8%	44.1%
Candidate's seat	Cirencester and Tewkesbury	Leeds South East
Speaker before election
Douglas Clifton Brown
Conservative
Elected Speaker
William Morrison
Conservative

The 1951 election of the Speaker of the House of Commons occurred on 31 October 1951, following the 1951 general election and the retirement of the previous speaker Douglas Clifton Brown. The election resulted in the election of Conservative MP William Morrison. This was one of the few speaker elections held in the 20th century in which there was more than one nominee (the others including 1971 and 1992), and the first contested election of speaker since 10 April 1895.

== Nominated candidates ==
- William Morrison (Conservative), former Minister of Town and Country Planning, Member of Parliament for Cirencester and Tewkesbury
- Major James Milner (Labour), incumbent Chairman of Ways and Means, Member of Parliament for Leeds South East

== Election ==
The election was conducted by means of a conventional parliamentary motion, originally to elect Morrison. He was proposed by Sir Hugh O'Neill and seconded by Sir Ralph Glyn.

Samuel Viant then moved an amendment to the original motion to elect Milner, who was then seconded by David Logan.

Both Morrison and Milner then gave their speeches of submission to the will of the House.

== Results ==
MPs voted on the motion that Morrison take the chair as speaker, which was approved by 318 votes to 251. Morrison was then conducted to the chair by O'Neill and Glyn.

== Aftermath ==
Milner was replaced as Chairman of Ways and Means by his deputy Charles MacAndrew who in turn was replaced by Liberal Rhys Hopkin Morris.

On 20 December he was elevated to the House of Lords as Baron Milner of Leeds, of Roundhay in the City of Leeds.
