= 1895 Speaker of the British House of Commons election =

- 10 April 1895
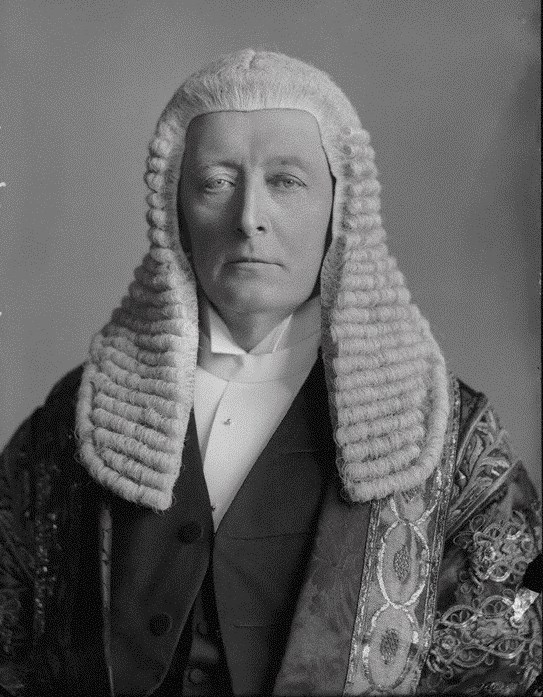

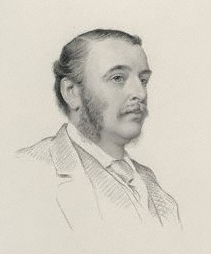
Candidate	William Court Gully	Matthew White Ridley
Party	Liberal	Conservative and Liberal Unionist
Popular vote	285	274
Percentage	51.0%	49.0%
Candidate's seat	Carlisle	Blackpool
Speaker before election
Arthur Wellesley Peel
Liberal
Elected Speaker
William Court Gully
Liberal

The 1895 election of the Speaker of the House of Commons occurred on 10 April 1895, following the retirement of the previous Speaker Arthur Wellesley Peel. The election resulted in the election of Liberal MP William Court Gully by the narrow margin of 11 votes. It was the first contested Speaker election since 27 May 1839. The next contested election would not be for another 56 years, until 31 October 1951.

== Nominated candidates ==
- William Court Gully (Liberal)
- Sir Matthew White Ridley (Conservative and Liberal Unionist)

== Election ==
The election was conducted by means of a conventional parliamentary motion, originally to elect Gully. He was proposed by Samuel Whitbread and seconded by Augustine Birrell.

Sir John Mowbray then moved an amendment to the original motion to elect Sir Matthew White Ridley, who was then seconded by John Lloyd Wharton.

Both Gully and Ridley then gave their speeches of submission to the will of the House.

== Results ==
MPs voted on the motion that Gully take the Chair as Speaker, which was approved by 285 votes to 274. Gully was then conducted to the Chair by Whitbread.
