= Speaker of the House of Commons (United Kingdom) =

Presiding officer of the House of Commons

- Logo of the House of Commons

- Flag of the House of Commons

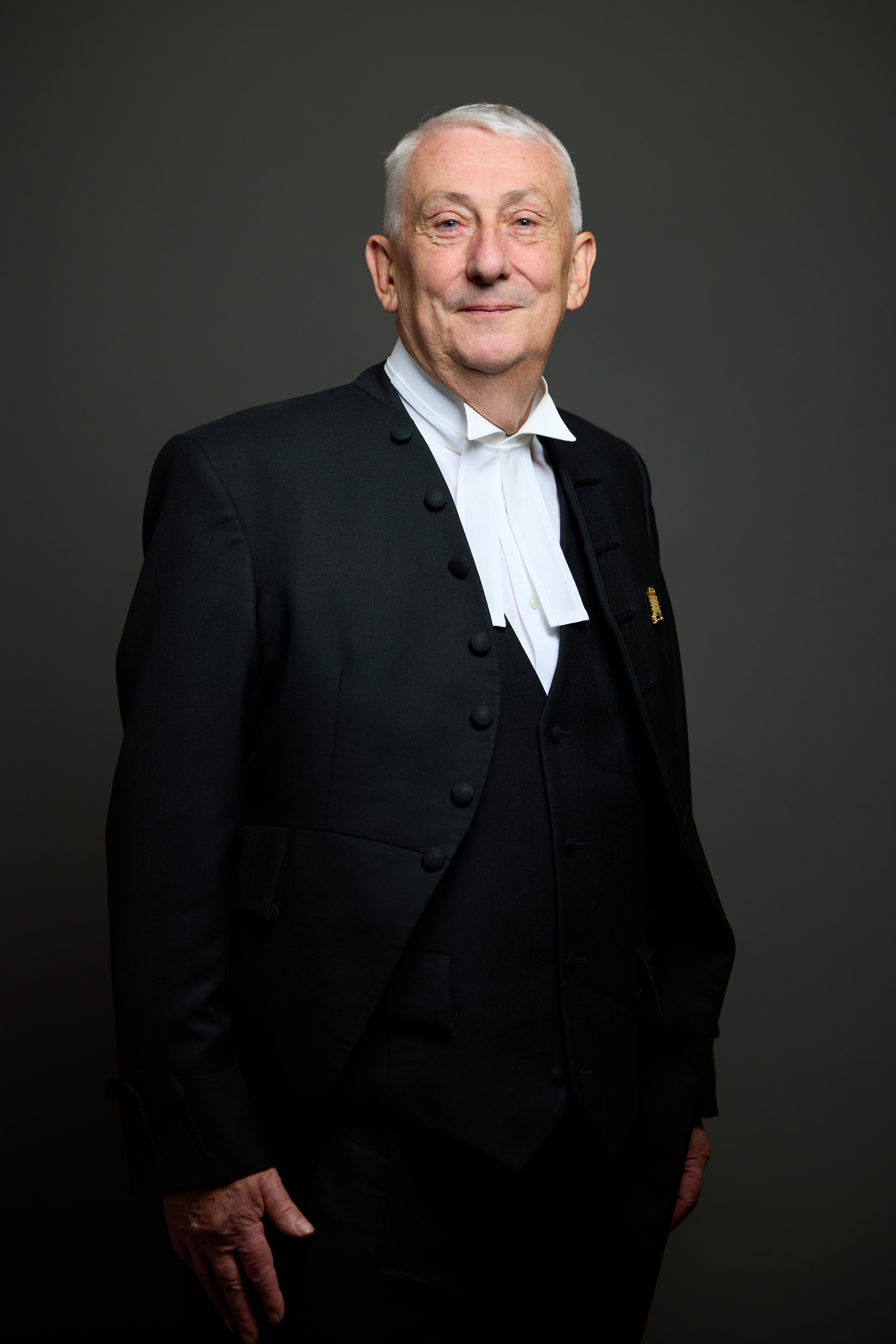
- Incumbent; Sir Lindsay Hoyle since November 4th, 2019
- House of Commons of the United Kingdom; Speaker's Office
- Style: Mr Speaker (informal and within the house); The Right Honourable (within the UK and the Commonwealth)
- Status: Presiding and chief administrative officer
- Member of: House of Commons; House of Commons Commission; Privy Council; Boundary Commissions; SCIPSA; SCEC
- Residence: Speaker's House, Palace of Westminster
- Nominator: No fewer than twelve MPs, at least three of whom must be from different political parties
- Appointer: House of Commons; approved and sworn in by the Sovereign
- Term length: At His Majesty's pleasure; elected by the Commons at the start of each parliament, and upon a vacancy
- Formation: 1377
- First holder: Thomas Hungerford (first recorded holder, though role existed before)
- Deputy: Chairman of Ways and Means
- Salary: Entitled to £156,676 annually (including £79,468 MP's salary)
- Website: Official website

The Speaker of the House of Commons is the presiding officer of the House of Commons, the lower house and primary chamber of the Parliament of the United Kingdom. The current speaker, Lindsay Hoyle, was elected Speaker on November 4th 2019, following the retirement of John Bercow. Hoyle began his first full parliamentary term in the role on December 17th 2019, having been unanimously re-elected after the 2019 general election.

The speaker presides over the House's debates, determining which members may speak and which amendments are selected for consideration. The speaker is also responsible for maintaining order and decorum in the House during debate and during its normal operations. As a result, the speaker has full, supreme authority to impose the penalties that they deem just and that they deem fair on members who break the rules of the House. By convention, the Speaker is strictly non-partisan; accordingly, a Speaker is expected to renounce all affiliation with their former political parties when taking office and afterwards.

The speaker does not take part in debate or vote (except to break ties; and even then, the convention is that the speaker casts the tie-breaking vote according to Speaker Denison's rule which results either in further debate or a vote for the status quo). Aside from duties relating to presiding over the House, the speaker also performs administrative and procedural functions. In addition, they remain a constituency Member of Parliament (MP), are part of the Privy Council, and represent the Commons to the monarch, the House of Lords and other authorities. The official residence of the Speaker is the Speaker's House at the Palace of Westminster.

== History ==
=== Early history ===
The office of the speaker is almost as old as the Parliament itself. The earliest year for which a presiding officer has been identified is 1258, when Peter de Montfort presided over the Parliament held in Oxford. Early presiding officers were known by the title parlour or prolocutor. The continuous history of the office of speaker is held to date from 1376 when Peter de la Mare spoke for the commons in the "Good Parliament" as they joined leading magnates in purging the chief ministers of the Crown and the most unpopular members of the king's household. Edward III was frail and in seclusion; his prestigious eldest son, Edward the Black Prince, terminally ill. It was left to the next son, a furious John of Gaunt, to fight back. He arrested De la Mare and disgraced other leading critics.

In the next, "Bad Parliament", in 1377, a cowed Commons put forward Gaunt's steward, Thomas Hungerford, as their spokesman in retracting their predecessors' misdeeds of the previous year. Gaunt evidently wanted a "mirror-image" as his form of counter-coup and this notion, born in crisis, of one 'speaker', who quickly also became 'chairman' and organiser of the Commons' business, was recognised as valuable and took immediate root after 1376–1377.

On October 6th 1399, John Cheyne of Beckford (Gloucester) was elected speaker. The powerful Archbishop of Canterbury, Thomas Arundel, is said to have voiced his fears of Cheyne's reputation as a critic of the Church. Eight days later, Cheyne resigned on grounds of ill-health, although he remained in favour with the king and active in public life for a further 14 years.

Although the officer was elected by the Commons at the start of each Parliament, with at least one contested election known, in 1420 (Roger Hunt prevailing by a majority of just four votes), in practice the Crown was usually able to get whom it wanted. Whilst the principle of giving this spokesman personal immunity from recrimination as only being the voice of the whole body was quickly adopted and did enhance the Commons' role, the Crown found it useful to have one person with the authority to select and lead the lower house's business and responses to the Crown's agenda, much more often than not in the way the Crown wanted. Thus, Whig ideas of the Commons growing in authority as against royal power are somewhat simplistic; the Crown used the Commons as and when it found it advantageous to do so, and the speakership was one means to make the Commons a more cohesive, defined and effective instrument of the king's government.

Throughout the medieval and early modern period, every speaker was an MP for a county, reflecting the implicit position that such shire representatives were of greater standing in the house than the more numerous burgess (municipality) MPs. Although evidence is almost non-existent, it has been surmised that any vote was by count of head, but by the same token perhaps the lack of evidence of actual votes suggests that most decisions, at least of a general kind, were reached more through persuasion and the weight by status of the county MPs. In such a situation, the influence of the speaker should not be underestimated. Thomas More was the first speaker to go on to become Lord Chancellor.

=== 17th to mid-19th century ===
Until the 17th century, members of the House of Commons often continued to view their speaker (correctly) as an agent of the Crown. As Parliament evolved, however, the speaker's position grew to involve more duties to the House than to the Crown; this was definitely true by the time of the English Civil War. This change is sometimes said to be reflected by an incident in 1642, when King Charles I entered the House in order to search for and arrest Five Members for high treason. When the King asked him if he knew of the location of these members, the speaker, William Lenthall, replied: "May it please your Majesty, I have neither eyes to see nor tongue to speak in this place but as the House is pleased to direct me, whose servant I am here."

The development of Cabinet government under King William III in the late 17th century caused further change in the role of the speaker. Speakers were generally associated with the ministry, and often held other government offices. For example, Robert Harley served simultaneously as Speaker and as a Secretary of State between 1704 and 1705.

The speaker between 1728 and 1761, Arthur Onslow, reduced ties with the government, though the office remained to a large degree political.

=== The modern speakership ===
The speakership evolved into its modern form—in which the holder is an impartial and apolitical officer who does not belong to any party—only during the middle of the 19th century.

More than 150 individuals have served as Speaker of the House of Commons. Their names are inscribed in gold leaf around the upper walls of Room C of the House of Commons Library. Betty Boothroyd, elected in 1992, was the first female speaker (the first woman to sit in the speaker's chair was Betty Harvie Anderson, a Deputy Speaker from 1970). Michael Martin, elected in 2000, was the first Catholic speaker since the Reformation. John Bercow, elected in 2009, was the first Jewish speaker.

The speaker has significant influence on legislation, for example by selecting which amendments to a bill may be proposed, and by interpreting and enforcing the rules of Parliament as laid out in the official parliamentary rulebook, Erskine May. In 2019 Speaker John Bercow had significant influence in selecting which important amendments to legislation affecting Britain's exit from the European Union could be voted on, and later by not allowing the government to repeat a vote on the terms of exit, as the same motion may not be proposed twice in the same session of Parliament. Bercow was criticised for these interventions, but said that he was acting within his powers and enforcing clear rules in a non-partisan way.

Until 1992, all speakers were men, and were always addressed in Parliament as "Mr Speaker", and their deputies as "Mr Deputy Speaker". Betty Boothroyd was, at her request, addressed as "Madam Speaker". When Betty Harvie Anderson served in the 1970s as a Deputy Speaker, on the other hand, she was addressed as "Mr Deputy Speaker". Eleanor Laing, who was a Deputy Speaker from 2013 to 2019 and again from 2020 to 2024, was addressed as "Madam Deputy Speaker".

The speaker has traditionally been offered a life peerage in the House of Lords upon stepping down – even if ousted following a political scandal. This tradition was broken in 2020 when John Bercow became the first Speaker in 230 years to step down and not be nominated for the Lords by the government. Since the death of Baroness Boothroyd in 2023, it is also the first time in over fifty years that the membership of the Lords has not included a former Speaker.

== Election ==
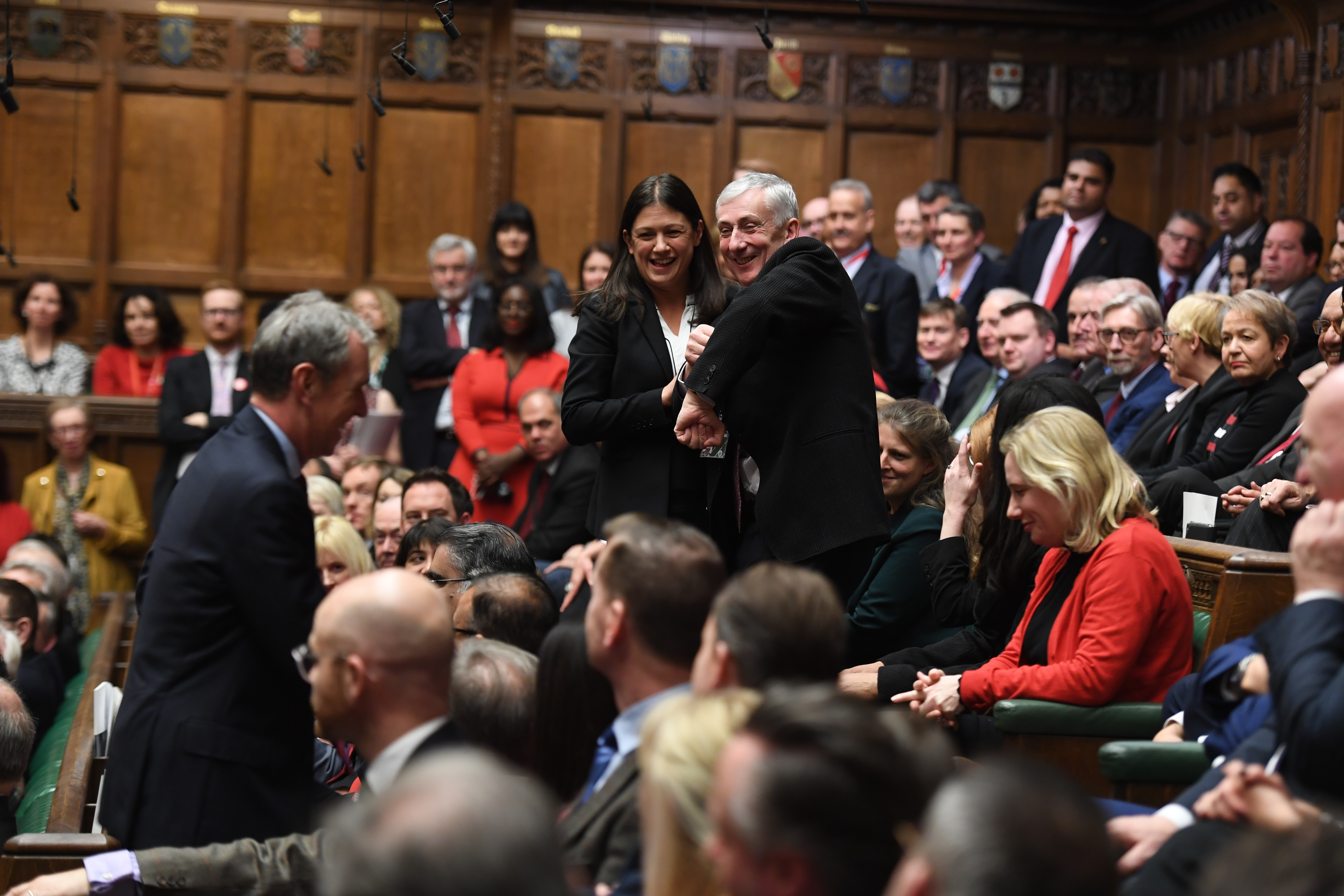
Sir Lindsay Hoyle is dragged to the chair, 2019.

MPs elect the speaker from amongst their own ranks. The House must elect a Speaker at the beginning of each new parliamentary term after a general election, or after the death or resignation of the incumbent. Once elected, a Speaker continues in office until the dissolution of Parliament, unless they resign prior to this. The House customarily re-elects the incumbent speaker from the previous Parliament. Theoretically, the House could elect an opposing candidate to the chair, but the last time this happened was in 1835, when Charles Manners-Sutton lost the election to James Abercromby.

The procedure for electing a Speaker has changed in recent years. Until 1971, the Clerk of the House of Commons became temporary Chairman of the House. As the clerk is never a member, and therefore is not permitted to speak, he would silently stand and point at the member who was to speak. However, this procedure broke down at the election of a new Speaker in 1971 (see below) and had to be changed. Since that time, as recommended by a Select committee, the MP with the longest period of unbroken service who is not a minister (either the Father or Mother of the House) becomes the presiding officer.

Until 2001, the election of a Speaker was conducted as a routine matter of House of Commons business, as it used motions and amendments to elect. A member would move "That Mr(s) [X] do take the Chair of this House as Speaker", and following debate (which may have included an amendment to replace the name of the member on whom the speakership was to be conferred), a routine division of the House would resolve in favour of one candidate. There was, however, a considerable amount of behind-the-scenes lobbying before suitable candidates were agreed upon, and so it was very rare for a new speaker to be opposed. However, this system broke down in 2000 when twelve rival candidates declared for the job and the debate occupied an entire parliamentary day. The House of Commons Procedure Committee then re-examined the means of electing a speaker and recommended a new system that came into effect in 2007 and was first used in June 2009, following the resignation of Michael Martin.

Under the new system, candidates must be nominated by at least twelve members, of whom at least three must be of a different party from the candidate. Each member may nominate no more than one candidate. The House then votes by secret ballot; an absolute majority (i.e. more than 50% of the votes cast) is required for victory. If no candidate wins a majority, then the individual with the fewest votes is eliminated, as are any other candidates who receive less than 5% of the votes cast, and as are any candidates who choose to withdraw. The House continues to vote, for several rounds if necessary, until one member receives the requisite majority. Then, the House votes on a formal motion to appoint the member in question to the speakership. (In the unlikely event that this motion fails, the House must hold a fresh series of ballots on all of the nominees.)

If only one candidate is nominated, then no ballot is held, and the House proceeds directly to the motion to appoint the candidate to the speakership. A similar procedure is used if a Speaker seeks a further term after a general election: no ballot is held, and the House immediately votes on a motion to re-elect the speaker. If this motion fails, candidates are nominated, and the House proceeds with voting (as described above).

Upon the passage of the motion, the speaker-elect is expected to show reluctance at being chosen; they are customarily "dragged unwillingly" by MPs to the speaker's bench. This custom has its roots in the speaker's original function of communicating the Commons' opinions to the monarch. Historically, the speaker, representing the House to the monarch, potentially faced the monarch's anger and therefore required some persuasion to accept the post. Contrary to an often repeated claim, no speaker has ever been executed for his actions in that capacity. Six former speakers were executed between 1471 and 1535 (sometimes many years after their terms); for five of these, the execution was due to behaviour in subsequent offices.

The speaker-elect must receive approbation by the sovereign before they may take office; this has only been refused once, in 1679, to Edward Seymour. On the day of the election, the speaker-elect leads the Commons to the Chamber of the House of Lords, where Lords Commissioners appointed by the Crown confirm him or her in the monarch's name. The speaker then requests "in the name and on behalf of the Commons of the United Kingdom, to lay claim, by humble petition to His Majesty, to all their ancient and undoubted rights and privileges, especially to freedom of speech in debate, to freedom from arrest, and to free access to His Majesty whenever occasion shall require." After the Lords Commissioners, on the behalf of the sovereign, confirm the Commons' rights and privileges, the Commons return to their chamber. If a speaker is chosen in the middle of a parliament due to a vacancy in the office, they must receive the royal approbation as described above but does not again lay claim to the Commons' rights and privileges.

=== Notable elections ===
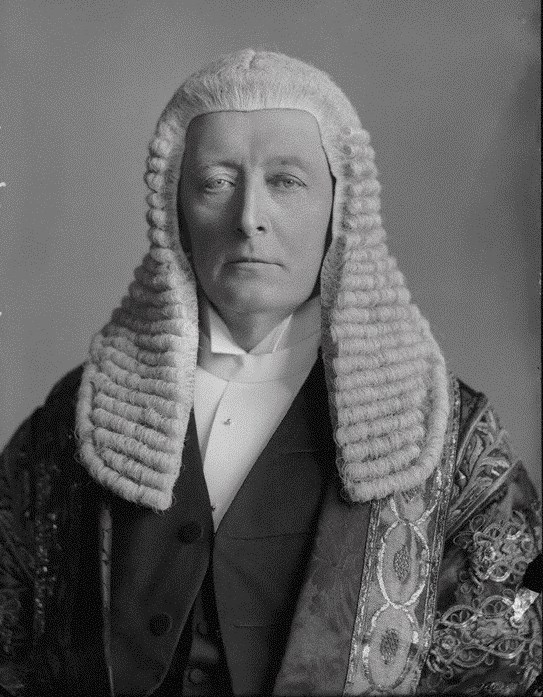
William Court Gully

Though the election of a Speaker is normally non-partisan, there have been several controversial elections in history. For example, in 1895, the sudden retirement of Arthur Peel came at a time when partisan feelings were running high. The Conservatives and Liberal Unionists put forward Matthew White Ridley, a well-respected MP who had many years of experience, and hoped for a unanimous election as the previous speaker had been a Liberal. However, the Liberals decided to oppose him and nominated William Court Gully who had been an MP for only nine years and had been a relatively quiet presence. On a party-line vote, Gully was chosen by 285 to 274. Although Gully proved his impartiality to the satisfaction of most of his opponents and was unanimously re-elected after the 1895 general election, the episode left many Unionists bitter. During that year's general election, Gully became one of the few speakers to be opposed in his own constituency, a sign of the bitterness of the time. It was not until the mid-1930s that it became common for a speaker to face some form of opposition for re-election.

The 1951 election was similarly controversial. After the incumbent speaker, Douglas Clifton Brown, retired at the 1951 general election, there was a great demand from the Labour Party for Major James Milner to become the first Labour speaker after he had served as deputy speaker for eight years. However, the Conservatives (who had just regained power) nominated William Shepherd Morrison against him. The vote again went down party lines, and Morrison was elected. Milner received a peerage as compensation.

In 1971, having had early warning that Horace King would be retiring, the Conservatives took the lead in offering to the Labour Party either Selwyn Lloyd or John Boyd-Carpenter as potential speakers. The Labour Party chose Selwyn Lloyd, partly because he was perceived as a weak figure. However, when the House of Commons debated the new speaker, Conservative MP Robin Maxwell-Hyslop and Labour MP Willie Hamilton nominated Geoffrey de Freitas, a senior and respected backbench Labour MP. De Freitas was taken aback by the sudden nomination and urged the House not to support him (a genuine feeling, unlike the feigned reluctance which all speakers traditionally show). Lloyd was elected, but there was a feeling among all parties that the system of election needed to be overhauled. A candidate's consent is now required before they can be nominated.

Bernard Weatherill had announced his impending retirement a long time before the 1992 general election, leading to a long but suppressed campaign for support. Betty Boothroyd, a Labour MP who had been a deputy speaker, was known to be extremely interested in becoming the first woman speaker (and in doing so, finished the chances of fellow Labour MP Harold Walker who had also been a deputy speaker). The Conservative former Cabinet member Peter Brooke was put forward at a late stage as a candidate. Unlike previous elections, there was an active campaign among Conservative MPs to support Boothroyd and about 70 of them did so, ensuring her election. She was the only speaker elected in the 20th century not to be a member of the governing party at the time of her first election.

Betty Boothroyd announced her retirement shortly before the summer recess in 2000, which left a long time for would-be speakers to declare their candidature but little opportunity for Members of Parliament to negotiate and decide on who should be chosen. Many backbench Labour MPs advanced the claims of Michael Martin. Most Conservatives felt strongly that the recent alternation between the main parties ought to be maintained and a Conservative speaker chosen. The most prominent Conservative choices were George Young and Deputy Speaker Alan Haselhurst. With several additional candidates announcing themselves, the total number of Members seeking the speakership was 14, none of whom would withdraw. A lengthy sitting of the House saw Michael Martin first proposed, then each of the other candidates proposed in turn as amendments, which were all voted down. In points of order before the debate, many members demanded a secret ballot.

== Removal ==
There is no formal process for removing the Speaker. Ed Selkirk Ford of the Constitution Society has suggested this is a deliberate protection against a majority government removing a speaker they are displeased with on a whim.

The House may pass a non-binding motion expressing no confidence in the Speaker, which can make their position unsustainable in the face of opposition from a sizeable portion of MPs. The Speaker can be removed by losing their seat as an MP, for example through disqualification, expulsion, or a successful recall petition.

== Non-partisanship ==
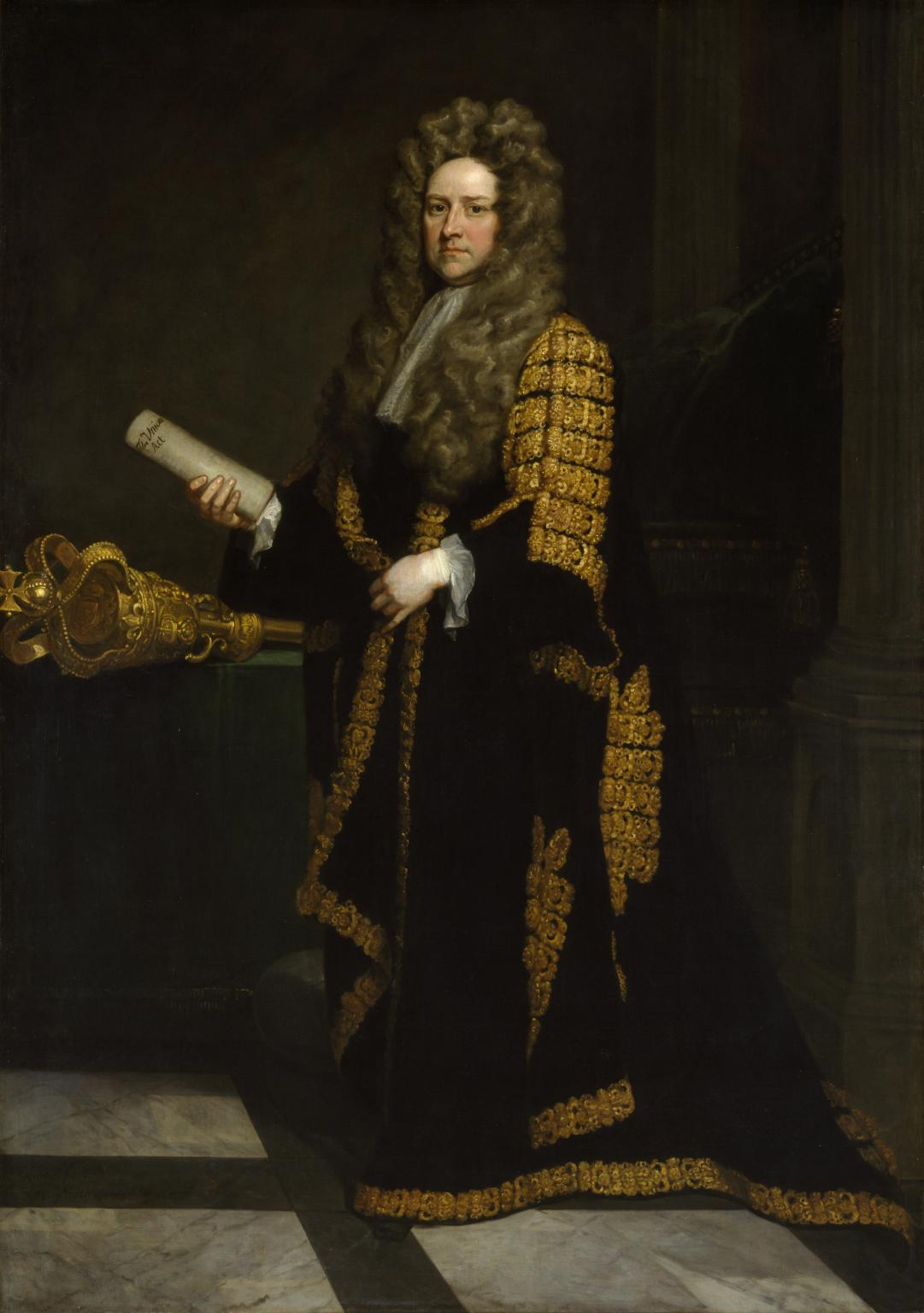
Portrait of John Smith by Godfrey Kneller, 1708

By (post 19th century) convention the speaker severs all ties with their political party while in office, as it is considered essential they be seen as an impartial presiding officer. Many have served in ministerial or other political positions beforehand. For example, Selwyn Lloyd and George Thomas had both served as high-ranking Cabinet members and Bernard Weatherill and Betty Boothroyd had been party whips.

In the House, the speaker does not vote on any motion, except to resolve ties (see section below). By modern convention the deputies (actively presiding roles) adhere to this and number one from the speaker's former party, and two from the other side of the House. Thus no net voting power is lost for government or the opposition.

After leaving office, the speaker normally takes no part in party politics; if elevated to the House of Lords, they would normally sit as a crossbencher. If a former speaker desires to be (re-)elected to the Commons, they may rejoin their pre-speakership party.

=== Seat in Parliament ===
The speaker will customarily seek re-election at a general election not under a party label – being entitled to describe themselves on the ballot as "The Speaker seeking re-election". In the past they could be returned unopposed, but this has not happened since 1931. The main (usually two) parties taking part in the offsetting of three Deputies and Speaker (i.e. two each) seldom field opponents by logic and convention; opponents are deemed to question the speaker's role, performance or means of appointment if they stand.

When ex-Tory Edward FitzRoy was opposed by a Labour Party candidate at the 1935 general election, there was strong disapproval from other parties and a sub-committee of the Cabinet considered whether a mechanism should be created to facilitate the Speaker's automatic re-election (as is done for the speaker of the lower house of the Irish parliament). The sub-committee concluded that parliamentary opinion would not favour this suggestion. Likewise, in December 1938 the Commons rejected a motion from the prime minister for a Select Committee to re-examine the idea. The sub-committee, chaired by former Prime Minister David Lloyd George, reported in April 1939 that no change should be made; disallowing opposition to a sitting speaker would be "a serious infringement of democratic principles" and that "to alter the status of the speaker, so that he ceased to be returned to the House of Commons by the same electoral methods as other members or as a representative of a Parliamentary constituency, would be equally repugnant to the custom and tradition of the House".

Labour and Liberal candidates opposed Selwyn Lloyd in both elections in 1974. Labour and the SDP stood against Bernard Weatherill in 1987. Speakers from Scottish and Welsh seats commonly face nationalist opponents: Plaid Cymru stood against George Thomas at his re-election, and Scottish National Party candidates stood against Michael Martin throughout, as their party constitution requires them to stand in all seats in Scotland, since October 1974. In 2010 Speaker John Bercow faced ten opponents, including Nigel Farage, former leader of the UK Independence Party polling 17.4% of the vote and John Stevens, from the Buckinghamshire Campaign for Democracy party polling 21.4%. Bercow won with 47% of the vote.

The last sitting Speaker to be defeated in his own constituency was Richard Onslow in 1710.

== Role ==
=== Presiding officer ===
The speaker's primary function is to preside over the House of Commons. According to parliamentary rules, the speaker is the highest authority of the House of Commons and has final say over how its business and operations are conducted. Traditionally, the speaker, when presiding, wore court dress – a black coat with white shirt and bands, beneath a black gown, with stockings and buckled shoes, and a full-bottomed wig. But in 1992 Betty Boothroyd, the first female speaker, eschewed the wig. Her successor, Michael Martin, also declined to wear the wig; moreover, he chose to simplify other aspects of the costume, doing away with the once customary buckled court shoes and silk stockings. His successor John Bercow abandoned traditional dress, wearing a plain black gown over his lounge suit when presiding. For ceremonial occasions such as the State Opening, the speaker wears a black and gold robe with a train; previously, this was worn over court dress with a white waterfall cravat, but the present speaker wears plain morning dress.

Whilst presiding, the speaker sits in a chair at the front of the House. Traditionally, members supporting the Government sit on the speaker's right, and those in Opposition on the speaker's left. The speaker's powers are extensive – much more so than those of the speaker's counterpart in the House of Lords, the Lord Speaker. Most importantly, the speaker calls on members to speak; no member may make a speech without the speaker's prior permission. By custom, the speaker alternates between members supporting the Government and those in Opposition. Members direct their speeches not to the whole House, but to the speaker, using the words "Mister Speaker" or "Madam Speaker". Members must refer to each other in the third person by the name of their constituency or their ministerial titles (not their names); they may not directly address anyone other than the speaker (who does call them by name). In order to remain neutral, the speaker generally refrains from making speeches, although there is nothing to prevent him or her from doing so. For example, on Tuesday, September 1st, 2020, Speaker Hoyle addressed the House on the subject of the arrest of a Conservative MP for rape.

Video of John Bercow (speaker from 2009 to 2019) explaining the speaker's role of keeping order

During debate, the speaker is responsible for maintaining order and decorum, and rules on all points of order (objections made by members asserting that a rule of the House has been broken – though sometimes used by a Member in a rhetorical manner such as to ask if it is in order that (some named matter) be placed in the official record while knowing that by asking it will be, or asking if (some Minister) has informed the Speaker of an intention to make a statement on (some named topic) to the House as a way to record the request in the official record); the decisions may not be appealed. The speaker bases decisions on the rules of the House and on precedent; if necessary, they may consult with the Parliamentary Clerks before issuing a ruling. In addition, the speaker has other powers that may be used to maintain orderly debate. Usually, the speaker attempts to end a disruption, or "calls members to order", by loudly repeating "ORDER! ORDER!" If members do not follow instructions, the speaker may punish them by demanding that they leave the House for the remainder of the day's sitting. For gross misconduct and misbehaviour, the speaker may order the Sergeant-At-Arms to remove the member from the House or to place them into custody. Similarly, for other acts of grave disobedience, the speaker may "name" a member, by saying "I name [Mr/Mrs X] …," (deliberately breaching the convention that members are only referred to by reference to their constituency) "…the [Right] Honourable Member for [Y]". The House may then vote to suspend the member "named" by the speaker, for five sitting days for a first offence. In case of "grave disorder", the speaker may immediately adjourn the entire sitting. This power has been invoked on several occasions since it was conferred in 1902.

In addition to maintaining discipline, the speakers must ensure that debate proceeds smoothly. If they find that a member is making irrelevant remarks, is tediously repetitive, or is otherwise attempting to delay proceedings, they may order the member to end the speech.

Before a debate begins in which "many members have expressed a wish to speak" or in which allotted Parliamentary time is short, the speaker may ask honourable members for (in reality demand) short speeches, and set a time limit. At the same time, however, the speaker is charged with protecting the interests of the minority by ensuring sufficient debate before a vote. Thus, the speaker may disallow a closure, which seeks to end debate and immediately put the question to a vote, if the speaker finds that the motion constitutes an abuse of the rules or breaches the rights of the minority.

The speaker selects which tabled amendments are selected for votes. Before the members of the House vote on any issue, the speaker "puts the question"; that is, they orally state the motion on which the members are to vote, and the members present say "aye" or "no". If this voice vote indicates a clear majority the result will usually be accepted, but if the acclamation is unclear or any member demands it, a division (vote in the aye and noe lobbies in which members' names are taken) takes place; the speaker and deputy speakers do not vote. The speaker may overrule a request for a division and maintain the original ruling; this power, however, is used only rarely, usually when members make frivolous requests for a division to delay proceedings.

=== Casting votes ===
When the Ayes and Noes are tied, the speaker must use the casting vote. By convention the casting vote is issued in accordance with the constitutional convention known as Speaker Denison's rule, rather than in line with the speaker's personal opinion in the matter. The principle is always to vote in favour of further debate, or, where it has been previously decided to have no further debate or in some specific instances, to vote in favour of the status quo. For example, the speaker would vote against a closure motion, or the final passage of a bill, or an amendment.

Since the House of Commons has more than 600 members, tied votes are very uncommon and speakers are rarely called upon to use the casting vote. Since 1801, there have been only 50 instances of tied divisions. A casting vote by a Speaker was cast on April 3rd 2019, the first since 1993, against an amendment to the Business of the House Motion. Speaker Bercow affirmed the precedent that it was not the role of the chair to create a majority that did not otherwise exist for action. The last casting vote was cast on 9 December 2025 by the Deputy Speaker Caroline Nokes on a question of leave to bring a Bill for the consideration of the House. The Deputy Speaker voted in favor to allow further debates.

=== Other functions ===
In addition to the role of presiding officer, the speaker performs several other functions on behalf of the House of Commons.

- The speaker represents the body in relations with the Sovereign, the House of Lords, and non-parliamentary bodies. On important occasions of state (such as Queen Elizabeth II's Golden Jubilee in 2002), the speaker presents Addresses to the Crown on behalf of the House.
- The speaker performs various procedural functions such as deciding whether to recall the House from recess during a national emergency, when requested by the Government.
- When vacancies arise, the speaker authorises the issuance of writs of election.
- Furthermore, the speaker is responsible for certifying bills that relate solely to national taxation as "money bills" under the Parliament Acts 1911 and 1949. The House of Lords has no power to block or substantially delay a money bill; even if the Lords fail to pass the bill, it becomes law within a month of passage by the Commons. The speaker's decision on the matter is final, and cannot be challenged by the Upper House.
- Before 2021, under the former English votes for English laws procedures, the speaker certified which bills or parts of bills related to England or England & Wales only.

The speaker is also responsible for overseeing the administration of the House. The speaker chairs the House of Commons Commission, a body that appoints staff, determines their salaries, and supervises the general administration of those who serve the House. Furthermore, the speaker controls the parts of the Palace of Westminster used by the House of Commons. The speaker chairs the Speaker's Committee for the Independent Parliamentary Standards Authority (SCIPSA) and the Speaker's Committee on the Electoral Commission (SCEC). Also, the speaker is the ex officio Chairman of the four boundary commissions (for England, Wales, Scotland, and Northern Ireland), which are charged with redrawing the boundaries of parliamentary constituencies to reflect population changes. However, the speaker normally does not attend meetings of the boundary commissions; instead, the Deputy Chairman of the commission (usually a judge) normally presides.

The speaker appoints MPs to serve on the Ecclesiastical Committee.

When John Bercow was Speaker, he ran a series of lectures called Speaker's Lectures.

Finally, the speaker continues to represent their constituency in Parliament. Like any other Member of Parliament, the speaker deals with issues raised by constituents and attempts to address their concerns.

== Deputies ==
The speaker is helped by three deputies elected by the House (addressed Mr/Madam Deputy Speaker). The most senior has an alternative style Chairman of Ways and Means; the title derives from the defunct Committee of Ways and Means which could amend and expedite bills to tax. The others can be called the second or third deputy speakers but are formally in the House named the First and Second Deputy Chairmen of Ways and Means (this resembles the "Junior Lords of the Treasury" being the government chief whips). Typically the speaker presides for three hours each day; otherwise a deputy takes the Chair. During the annual Budget, which the Chancellor of the Exchequer reads out in outline, the Chairman of Ways and Means presides.

The speaker never presides over the Committee of the Whole House, which consists of all the members, but operates under more flexible rules of debate. This device was used so that members could debate independently of the speaker, who they suspected acted as an agent or spy of the monarch. Now the procedure is invoked to have a less procedurally strict debate.

Deputies have the same powers as the speaker when presiding and in deadlock are bound by constitutional precedent to follow Speaker Denison's rule. They do not take part in partisan politics and remain completely impartial in the House. They are entitled to take a full part in constituency politics including raising of questions, often written, of ministers. In general elections, they stand as party politicians.

== Precedence, salary, residence and privileges ==
The speaker is one of the highest-ranking officials in the United Kingdom. By an Order in Council issued in 1919, the speaker ranks in the order of precedence above all non-royal individuals except the Prime Minister, the Lord Chancellor, and the Lord President of the Council. In England and Wales, he also ranks below the two archbishops of the Church of England; in Scotland, he also ranks below the Moderator of the General Assembly of the Church of Scotland; and in Northern Ireland, he also ranks below the Church of Ireland and Roman Catholic archbishops of Armagh, and the Moderator of the General Assembly of the Presbyterian Church.

In 1789 Henry Addington received £6,000 as his salary as Speaker (equivalent to £792,716 in 2025).

In 2010, the speaker received a salary of £145,492, equal to that of a Cabinet Minister. Speaker's House, the official residence, is at the northeast corner of the Palace of Westminster and is used for official functions and meetings, with private accommodation in a four-bedroom apartment upstairs. Each day, prior to the sitting of the House of Commons, the speaker and other officials travel in procession from the apartments to the Chamber. The procession includes the Doorkeeper, the Serjeant-at-arms, the speaker, a trainbearer, the Chaplain, and the Speaker's Private Secretary. The Serjeant-at-Arms attends the speaker on other occasions, and in the House; they bear a ceremonial mace that symbolises the royal authority under which the House meets, as well as the authority of the House of Commons itself.

Speakers, according with their high order of precedence, are appointed to the Privy Council on election. Thus they keep entitlement to the style "The Right Honourable" and postnominal letters PC. On retirement most were since the Wars of the Three Kingdoms elevated to the House of Lords as viscounts. The last ennobled as a viscount was George Thomas in 1983. Since then, the custom has been for the Government to offer life peerages (life baronies) to those retiring. Division on John Bercow's legacy led to this precedent being broken for the first time in more than two centuries when he was not nominated to the House of Lords by the Government.

=== Speaker's Chaplain ===
Chaplain to the speaker was traditionally a canon residentiary of Westminster Abbey; from c.1990–2010 the post was held by that canon who is Rector of St Margaret's, Westminster (the parish church between Parliament and the Abbey). Under Speaker Bercow for 2010–2019, Rose Hudson-Wilkin, then serving as Vicar of Dalston and Haggerston, was appointed Speaker's Chaplain, the first chaplain appointed not to be a canon of the Abbey. The Speaker's Chaplain commences daily proceedings by leading prayers and also conducts marriages of Members when they are carried out in the crypt chapel of the Palace of Westminster.

=== Speaker's Counsel ===
The Speaker's Counsel is the speaker's legal adviser.

== Official dress ==
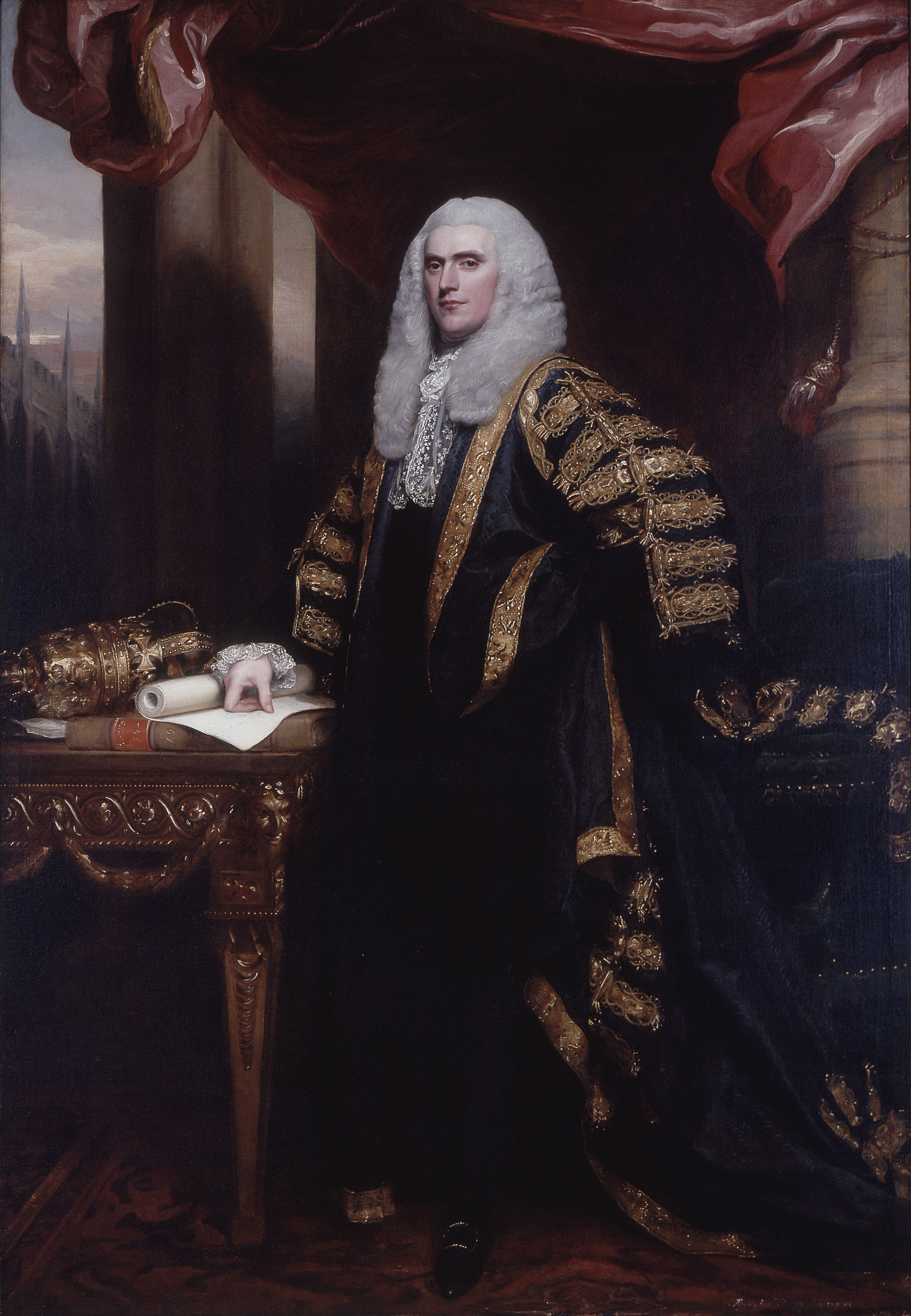
Henry Addington in state robes. Portrait of Henry Addington by John Singleton Copley, 1798.

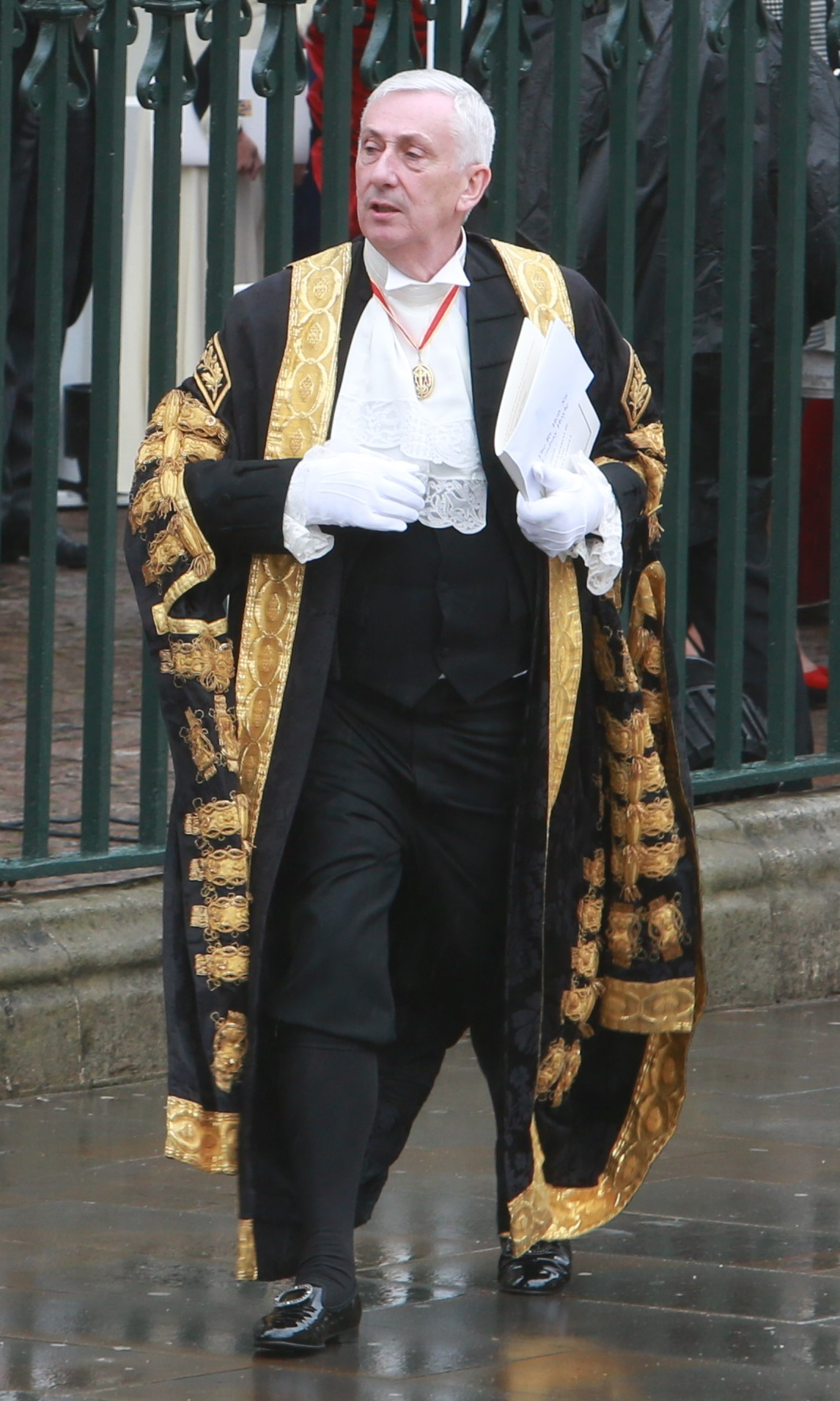
Lindsay Hoyle in state robes at the coronation of Charles III.

On normal sitting days, the speaker wears a black silk lay-type gown (similar to a King's Counsel's gown) with a train and a mourning rosette (also known as a 'wig bag') over the flap collar at the back.

On state occasions (such as the Opening of Parliament), the speaker wears a robe of black satin damask trimmed with gold lace and frogs and, in the past, a full-bottomed wig and tricorne hat.

The previous speaker, John Bercow, no longer wore the traditional court dress outfit, which included knee breeches, silk stockings and buckled court shoes under the gown, or the wig. Betty Boothroyd first decided not to wear the wig and Michael Martin chose not to wear knee breeches, silk stockings or the traditional buckled shoes, preferring flannel trousers and Oxford shoes. Bercow chose not to wear court dress altogether in favour of a lounge suit, as he felt uncomfortable in court dress (he wore morning dress under the State Robe at State Openings). As seen at the 2015 State Opening of Parliament, Bercow further toned down the state robe by removing the gold frogging on the sleeves and train, so that it now resembles a pro-chancellor's robe at certain universities. However, he returned to wearing the traditional robe in 2016. The new speaker elected in November 2019, Lindsay Hoyle, wears a gown like Bercow, but continues to wear his parliamentary identification card on a lanyard, as he did while Deputy Speaker. He later said he would wear the full court dress on ceremonial occasions, which he first did at the State Opening on 19 December 2019, with lanyard included, albeit without the wig, which is still stored under the bed of former Speaker Bernard Weatherill’s daughter-in-law. Following the death of Elizabeth II, Speaker Hoyle briefly returned to wearing court dress before returning to a regular business suit when the mourning period ended. Beginning with the 59th session of Parliament in 2024, Speaker Hoyle began wearing both pre-Martin court dress and Bercow-era robes.

== Current speaker and deputy speakers ==
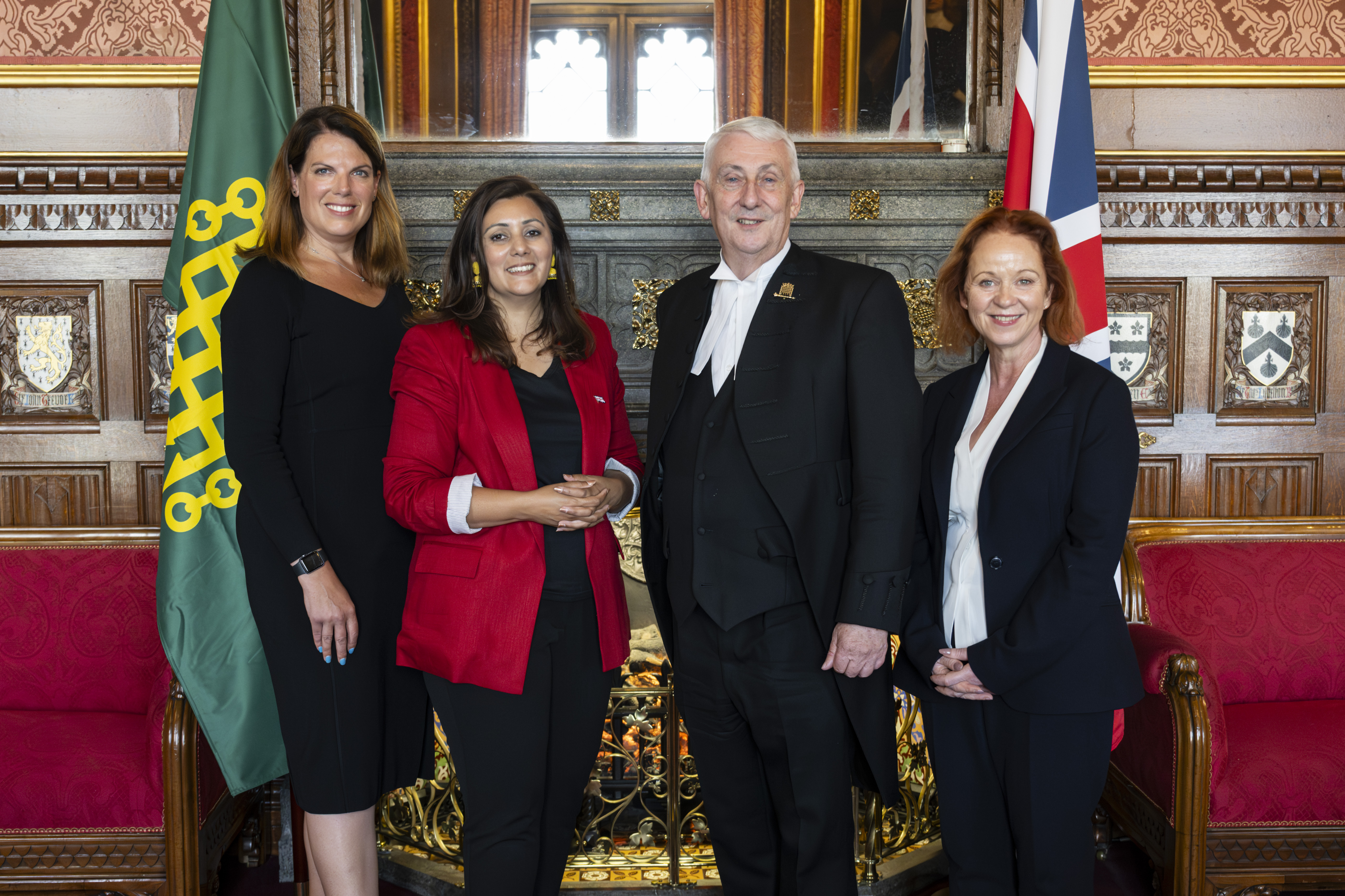
Current speaker and deputy speakers

| Position | Current holder | Term started | Political party | Constituency |
|---|---|---|---|---|
| Speaker of the House of Commons | Lindsay Hoyle | 4 November 2019 | Speaker (formerly Labour) | Chorley |
| Chairman of Ways and Means | Nus Ghani | 23 July 2024 | Conservative | Sussex Weald |
| First Deputy Chairman of Ways and Means | Judith Cummins | 23 July 2024 | Labour | Bradford South |
| Second Deputy Chairman of Ways and Means | Caroline Nokes | 23 July 2024 | Conservative | Romsey and Southampton North |

== See also ==
- List of speakers of the House of Commons of England (up to 1707)
- List of speakers of the House of Commons of the United Kingdom
- List of peerages created for speakers of the House of Commons
- Lord Speaker
- Llywydd of the Senedd
- Presiding Officer of the Scottish Parliament
- Speaker of the Northern Ireland Assembly
- Speaker's State Coach

== Bibliography ==
- Dasent, Arthur Irwin (1911): The Speakers of the House of Commons. London: John Lane
- House of Commons Information Office (2003) "The Speaker"
- MacDonagh, Michael (1914). The Speaker of the House. London: Methuen & Co.
- McKay, William (2004): Erskine May: Parliamentary Practice, 23rd ed. London: Butterworths Tolley
- Roskell, John Smith, The Commons and their Speakers in English Parliaments, 1376–1523, Manchester, 1965
- Roskell, John Smith, Parliament and Politics in Late Medieval England, 3 vols., London, 1983: contains individual essays on many medieval Speakers, plus one on origins of the office
