= Fox-Strangways =

Fox-Strangways is a surname, and may refer to:

- Arthur Henry Fox Strangways (1859–1948), English music critic
- Elizabeth Fox, Countess of Ilchester (c.1723–1792), also Fox-Strangways, wife of the 1st Earl
- Giles Fox-Strangways, 6th Earl of Ilchester (1874–1959)
- Harry Fox-Strangways, 7th Earl of Ilchester (1905–1964)
- Henry Fox-Strangways, 2nd Earl of Ilchester (1747–1802)
- Henry Fox-Strangways, 3rd Earl of Ilchester (1787–1858)
- Henry Fox-Strangways, 5th Earl of Ilchester (1847–1905)
- John Fox-Strangways (1803–1859), British diplomat, third son of the 2nd Earl
- Mary Fox-Strangways, Countess of Ilchester (1852–1935), Anglo-Irish noblewoman, wife of the 5th Earl
- Maurice Fox-Strangways, 9th Earl of Ilchester (1920–2006)
- Stephen Fox-Strangways, 1st Earl of Ilchester (1704–1776)
- Walter Angelo Fox-Strangways, 8th Earl of Ilchester (1887–1970)
- Vivian Fox-Strangways (1898–1974), British Army officer and colonial administrator
- William Fox-Strangways, 4th Earl of Ilchester (1795–1865), Fellow of the Royal Society

== See also ==
- Strangways
