= 1835 Speaker of the British House of Commons election =

- 19 February 1835
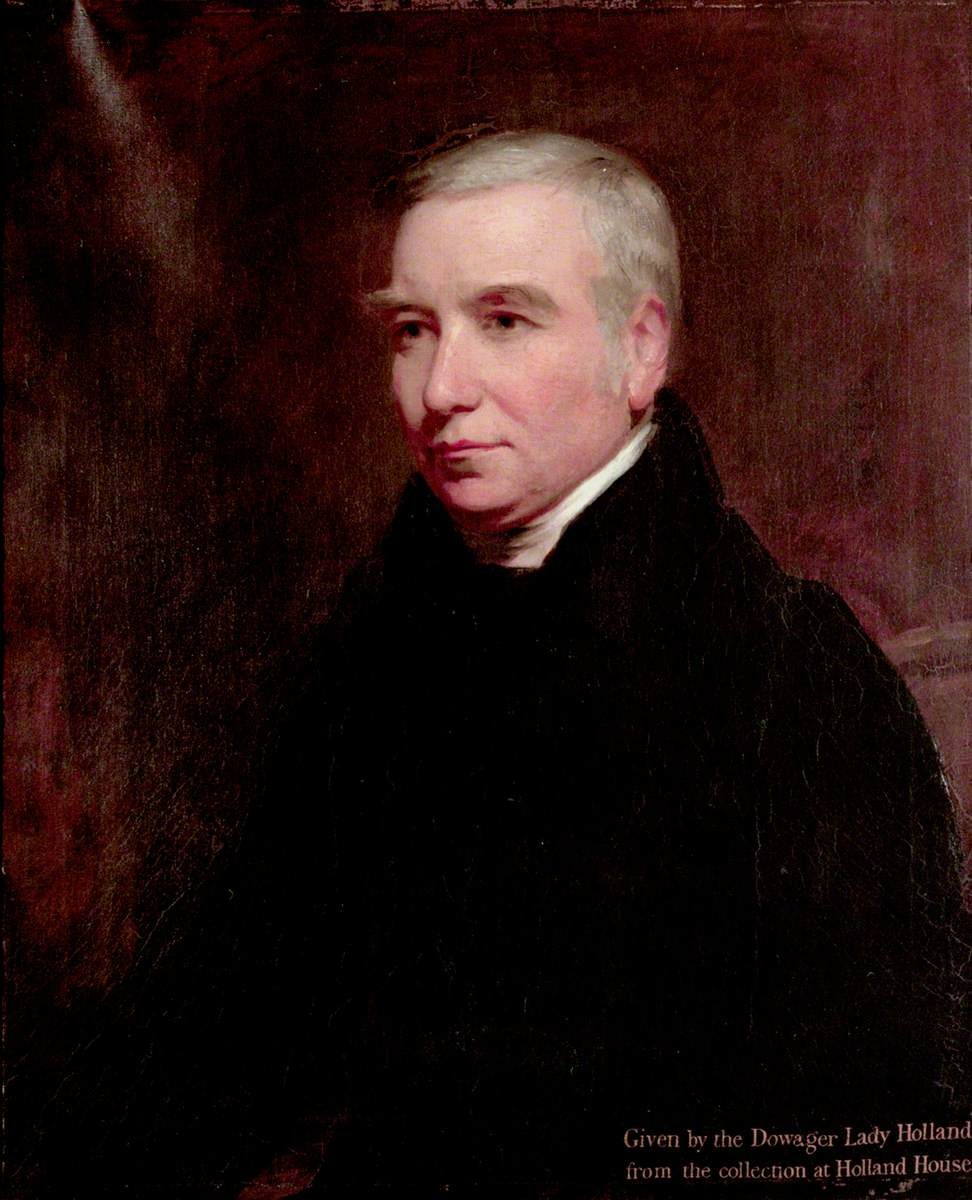

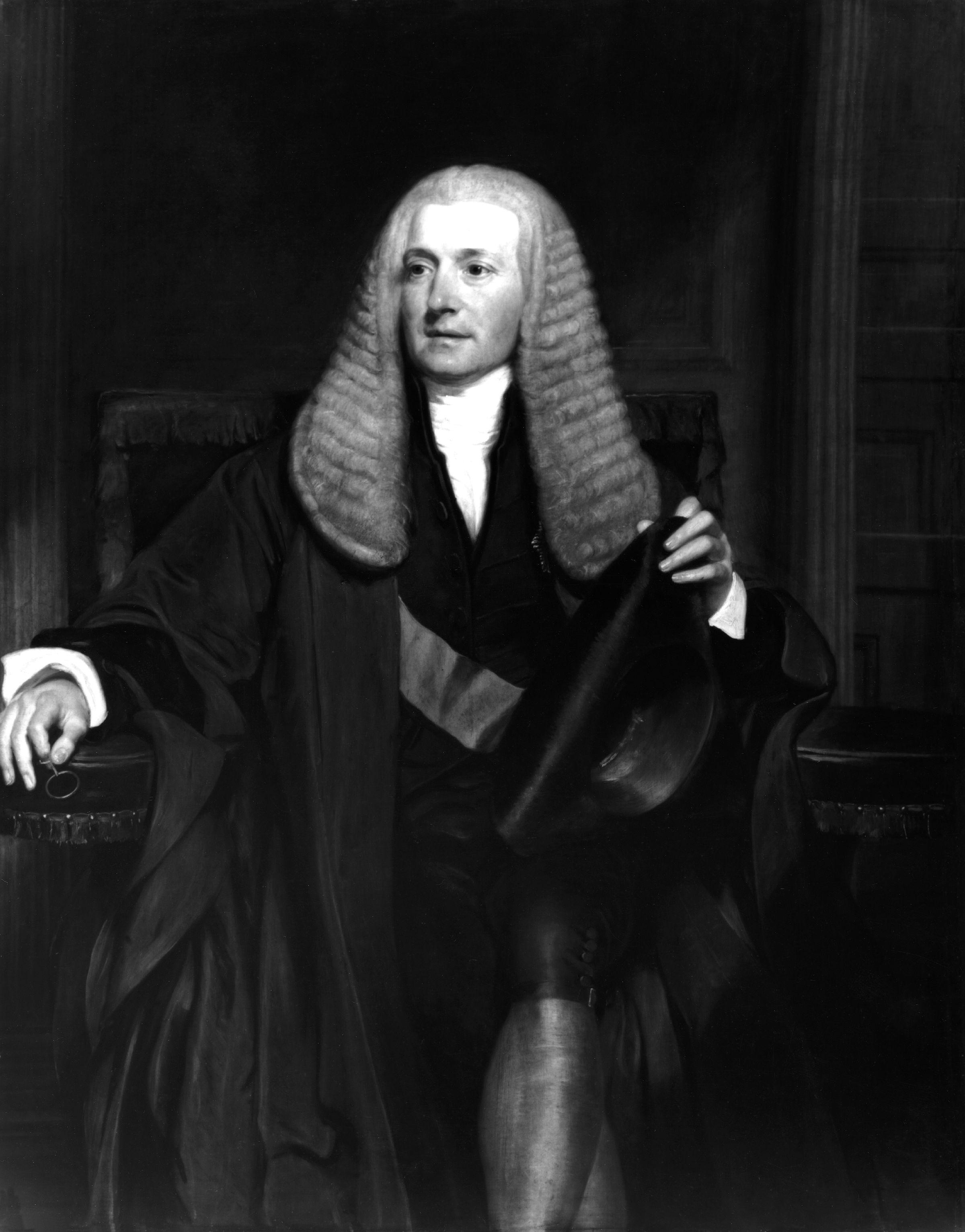
Candidate	James Abercromby	Sir Charles Manners-Sutton
Party	Whig	Speaker
Popular vote	316	306
Percentage	50.8%	49.2%
Candidate's seat	Edinburgh	Cambridge University
Speaker before election
Sir Charles Manners-Sutton
Elected Speaker
James Abercromby

The 1835 election of the Speaker of the House of Commons occurred on 19 February 1835.

Sir Charles Manners-Sutton, Speaker since 1817, was seeking an eighth term in office. He was proposed by Lord Francis Egerton and seconded by Sir Charles Burrell.

The Whigs objected to Manners-Sutton's Tory partisanship.

James Abercromby was proposed by William Denison and seconded by William Ord.

Both candidates addressed the House. Manners-Sutton denied the three charges of partisanship against him – that he had obstructed the previous Whig government, assisted in the formation of the new Conservative government, and had advised that the previous Parliament be dissolved.

A debate followed.

The motion "That the Right Hon. Sir Charles Manners Sutton do take the Chair of this House as Speaker" was defeated by 306 votes to 316, a majority of 10. The amended motion "That the Right Hon. James Abercromby do take the Chair of this House as Speaker" was then passed without division.

This was the only Speaker election since 1780 in which the incumbent Speaker was defeated. The elections of 1833 and 1835 were the only elections since 1780 in which an incumbent Speaker seeking re-election was opposed.
