= 1833 Speaker of the British House of Commons election =

← 1817	29 January 1833	1835 →
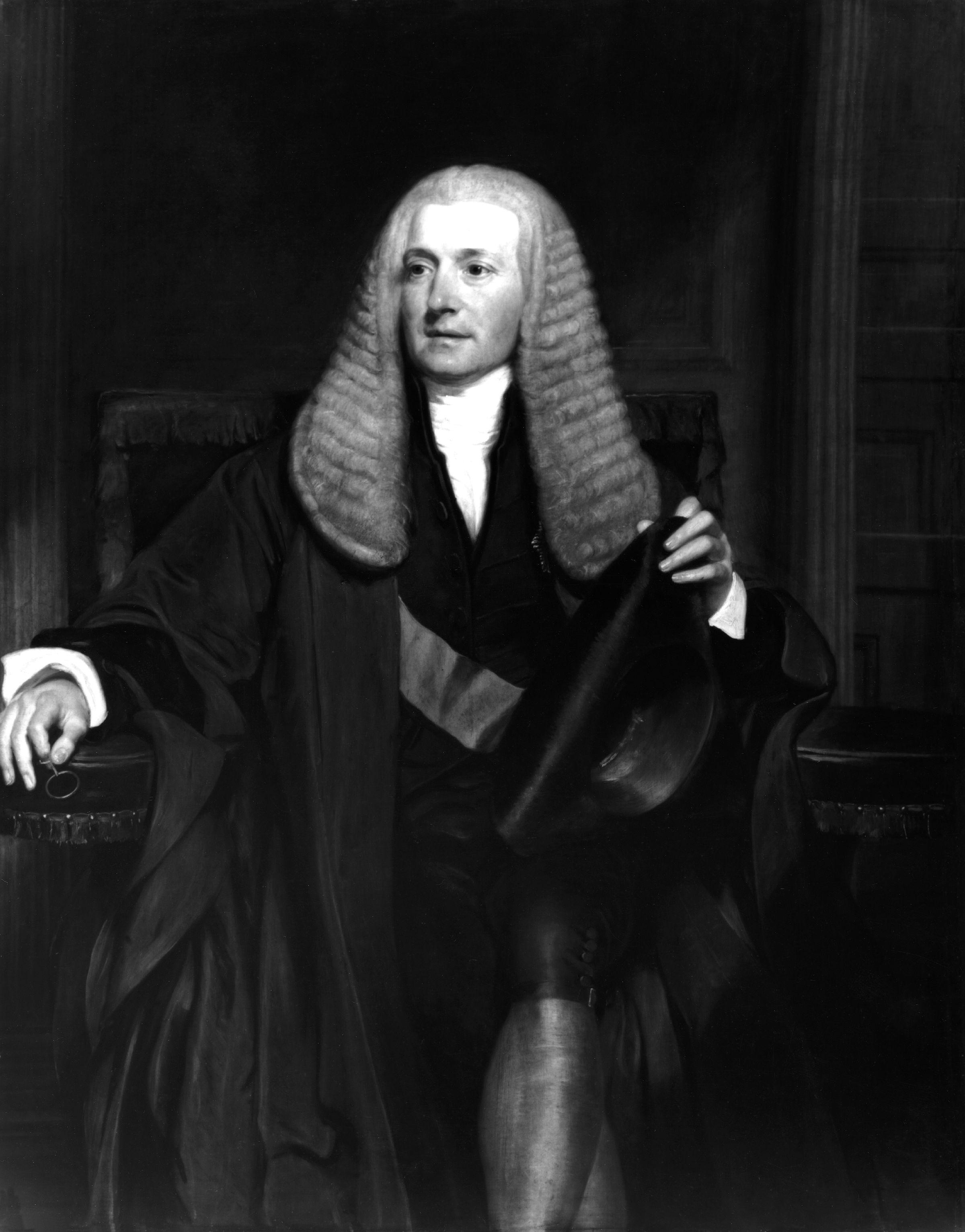

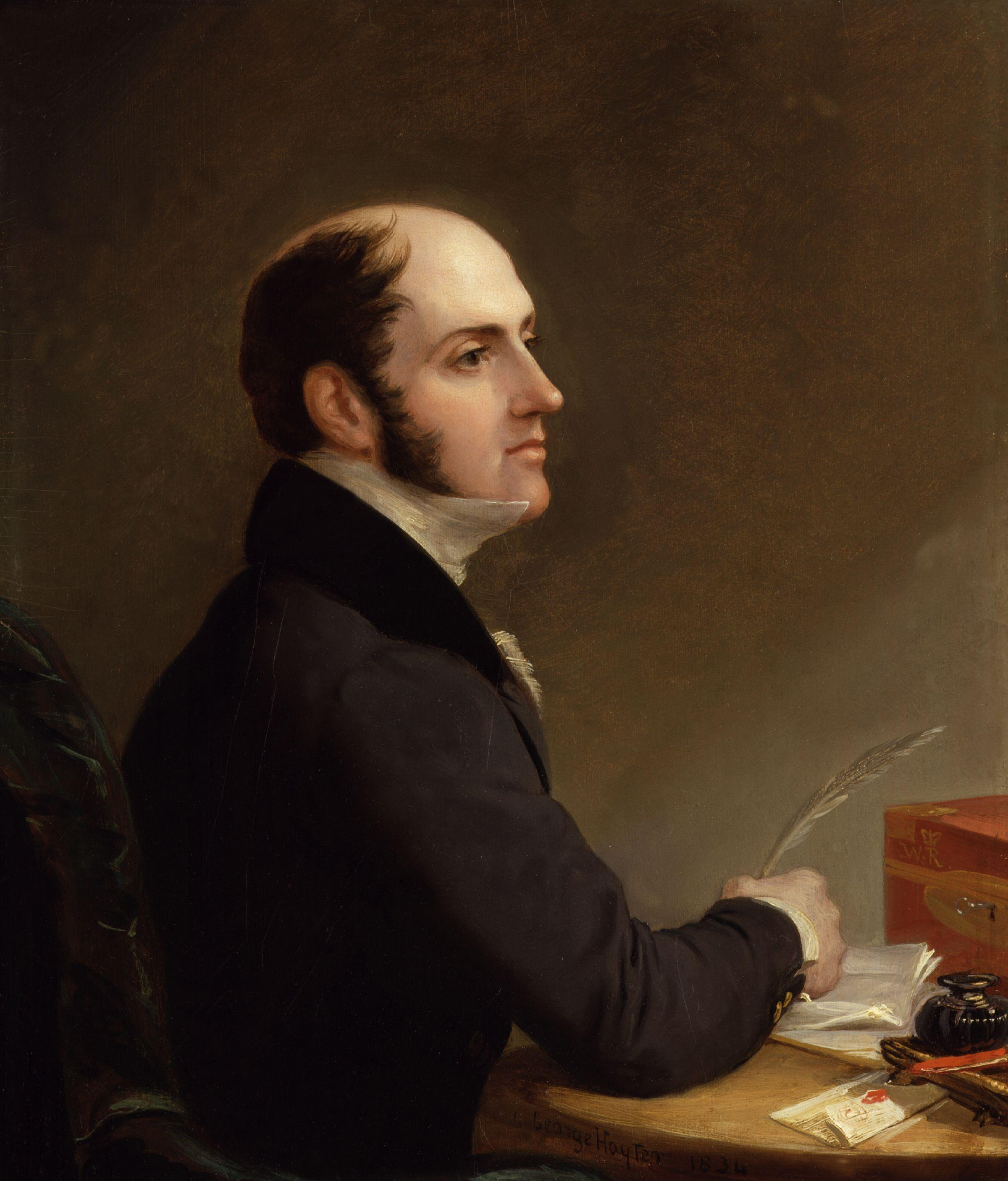
Candidate	Charles Manners-Sutton	Edward Littleton
Party	Speaker (politics)	Whig
Popular vote	241	31
Percentage	88.6%	11.4%
Candidate's seat	Cambridge University	Staffordshire South
Speaker before election
Charles Manners-Sutton
Elected Speaker
Charles Manners-Sutton

The 1833 election of the Speaker of the House of Commons occurred on 29 January 1833.

This was the first Parliament after the Reform Act 1832. Not wishing to have an inexperienced Speaker preside over the reformed Parliament, the government persuaded the long-serving incumbent Speaker Charles Manners-Sutton to postpone his retirement. He was standing for a seventh term as Speaker.

Joseph Hume (Radical) objected that Manners-Sutton, a vocal opponent of the reform, should not preside over a reformed Parliament. He proposed Edward Littleton (Whig). Daniel O'Connell (Irish Nationalist) seconded.

Viscount Morpeth, although a Whig, commended Manners-Sutton's conduct as Speaker, and proposed him. Sir Francis Burdett (Radical) seconded.

A debate ensued. Littleton spoke against his own nomination, stating his support for Manners-Sutton and asking that Manners-Sutton be elected without a division.

O'Connell objected to this: he would not countenance a Tory Speaker after the reform, believing that "the grand advantage of the Reform Bill was to put down Toryism in England — that vile and abominable system, which existed by the plunder of the people, and by the usurpation of their rights".

Among other objections to Manners-Sutton was the pension awarded on the basis that he was retiring: if re-elected he might draw both a pension and a salary.

Voting on Hume's motion that Littleton take the Chair, the motion was defeated by 31 votes to 241, a majority of 210. The amended motion that Manners-Sutton take the Chair was then passed without division.

The elections of 1833 and 1835 (in which Manners-Sutton was defeated) were the only elections since 1780 in which an incumbent Speaker seeking re-election was opposed.
