= William Petty-FitzMaurice, Earl of Kerry =

British politician

The Right Honourable William Petty-FitzMaurice, Earl of Kerry

Member of Parliament for Calne
- In office 1832–1836
- Preceded by: Thomas Babington Macaulay
- Succeeded by: John Fox-Strangways

Personal details
- Born: 30 March 1811 Mayfair, London, England
- Died: 21 August 1836 (aged 25) Mayfair, London, England
- Party: Whig
- Spouse: Lady Augusta Ponsonby (m. 1834; died 1836)
- Children: 1
- Parent: Henry Petty-Fitzmaurice (father)
- Relatives: Henry Petty-Fitzmaurice (brother); William Petty (grandfather); Henry Fox-Strangways (grandfather)

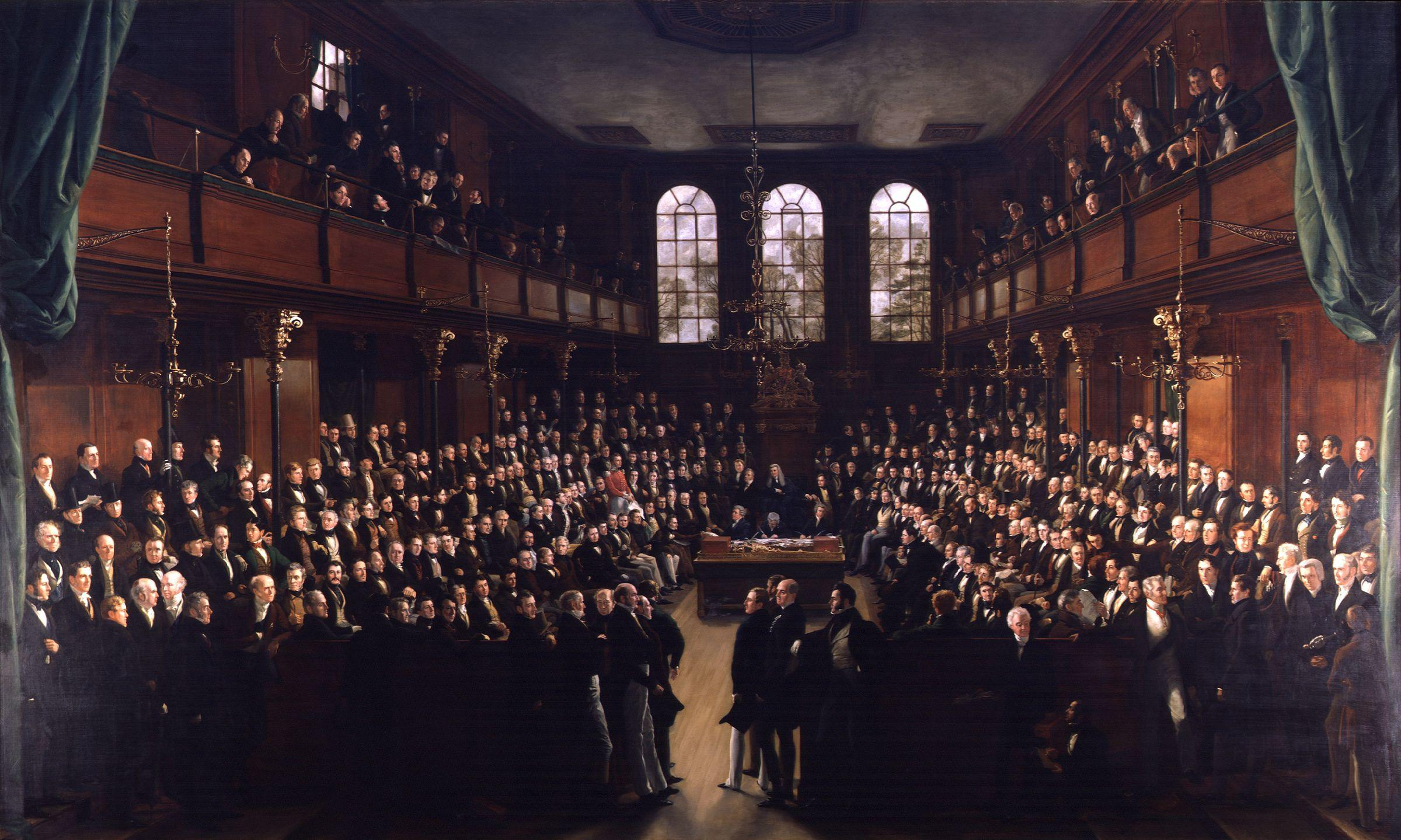
Depiction of the House of Commons during Kerry’s time in Parliament.

William Thomas Petty-FitzMaurice, Earl of Kerry (30 March 1811 – 21 August 1836), styled Earl of Wycombe between 1811–1818, was an Anglo-Irish aristocrat and Whig Member of Parliament for Calne, Wiltshire. He was the heir to his father, Henry Petty-Fitzmaurice, 3rd Marquess of Lansdowne, but died aged only 25.

== Background ==
Kerry was born at Lansdowne House, London, the eldest son of Henry Petty-Fitzmaurice, 3rd Marquess of Lansdowne, and Lady Louisa Emma, daughter of Henry Fox-Strangways, 2nd Earl of Ilchester.

== Political career ==
In 1832, Kerry was returned unopposed to Parliament for Calne, a borough his family had controlled for the Whigs since his ancestor William Petty, 2nd Earl of Shelburne bought out three of its largest estates in the mid-18th century, including Bowood House, which remains the family seat today. Thomas FitzMaurice claimed one of the two seats in 1762. In 1832, the borough was reduced to one member. Kerry was again returned unopposed in 1835 but died the following year.

He was succeeded by his mother's half-brother John Fox-Strangways.

== Marriage, issue, and death ==
Lord Kerry married Lady Augusta Lavinia Priscilla, daughter of John Ponsonby, 4th Earl of Bessborough, in 1834. They had one daughter:

- Lady Mary Caroline Louisa (25 April 1835 – 17 September 1927), who married in 1860 Sir Percy Egerton Herbert, and was the mother of George Herbert, 4th Earl of Powis, and two daughters.

Following a lengthy illness, Kerry died at Lansdowne House, London, in August 1836, aged 25. The cause of death was constrictive pericarditis.

The Countess of Kerry was reported to be in "a most pitiful state" after his death, being unable to get out of bed. She was taken to Dublin to recover, where it was soon discovered she was pregnant. She returned to Lansdowne House to await the birth. In April 1837, Freeman's Journal reported that news from 7 April that she had given birth to a son were false, and that the earl's brother now was expected to become heir apparent, the countess apparently having suffered a late miscarriage or stillborn son. The following day, the newspaper reported that the Countess had "so far recovered from her late illness as to be able to take carriage airings."

Kerry's younger brother Lord Henry succeeded him as their father's heir apparent but chose to be styled as the Earl of Shelburne — another courtesy title to the Marquessate of Lansdowne — instead of the Earl of Kerry. In the 1837 general election, Shelburne was elected to his brother's old seat for Calne, which he held until 1856. He succeeded in the marquessate in 1863 upon the death of their father.

Kerry's widow retained her title as the Countess of Kerry and remarried in 1845 to Hon. Charles Alexander Gore, brother of the fourth Earl of Arran. Her three sons with Gore were the barrister Sir Francis Charles Gore; sportsman Spencer Gore, the first winner of the Wimbledon Championships (and father of the artist Spencer Gore); and the theologian Rev. Charles Gore. She died in November 1904, aged 90.

=== Catherine, Princess of Wales ===
Research in 2012 suggested that Catherine, Princess of Wales (Kate Middleton), might be a collateral descendant of prime minister William Petty, 1st Marquess of Lansdowne (1737–1805), who is the grandfather of Lord Kerry. The connection might be through Lady Bullock, née Barbara May Lupton (1891–1974) who is the Princess's second cousin, thrice removed.

Parliament of the United Kingdom
Preceded by Thomas Babington Macaulay; Charles Richard Fox (representation reduced to one member 1832)	Member of Parliament for Calne; 1832–1836	Succeeded by Hon. John Fox-Strangways
