= Strange Ways (disambiguation) =

Strange Ways is an independent record label from Hamburg, Germany.

Strange Ways, Strangeways or similar may also refer to:

== Places ==
- Strangeways or HM Prison Manchester, in England
- Strangeways, Manchester, an area of inner north Manchester around the prison

== Arts and entertainment ==
=== Music ===
- Strangeways, Here We Come, a 1987 album by The Smiths
- "Strange Ways", a 1974 song by Kiss from Hotter Than Hell
- "Strangeways", a 1987 song by Deep Purple from The House of Blue Light
- "Strange Ways", a 1995 song by Ace of Base from The Bridge
- "Strange Ways", a 2004 song by Madvillain from Madvillainy

=== Film ===
- Strangeways Here We Come, a 2017 British comedy drama film shot in Salford, Greater Manchester

=== Graphic novel ===
- Strangeways, a 2008 graphic novel

== People ==
- Strangeways (surname), a surname

== See also ==
- Strangways, a surname
