= James Abercromby, 1st Baron Dunfermline =

British politician (1776–1858)

The Right Honourable The Lord Dunfermline PC, FRSE
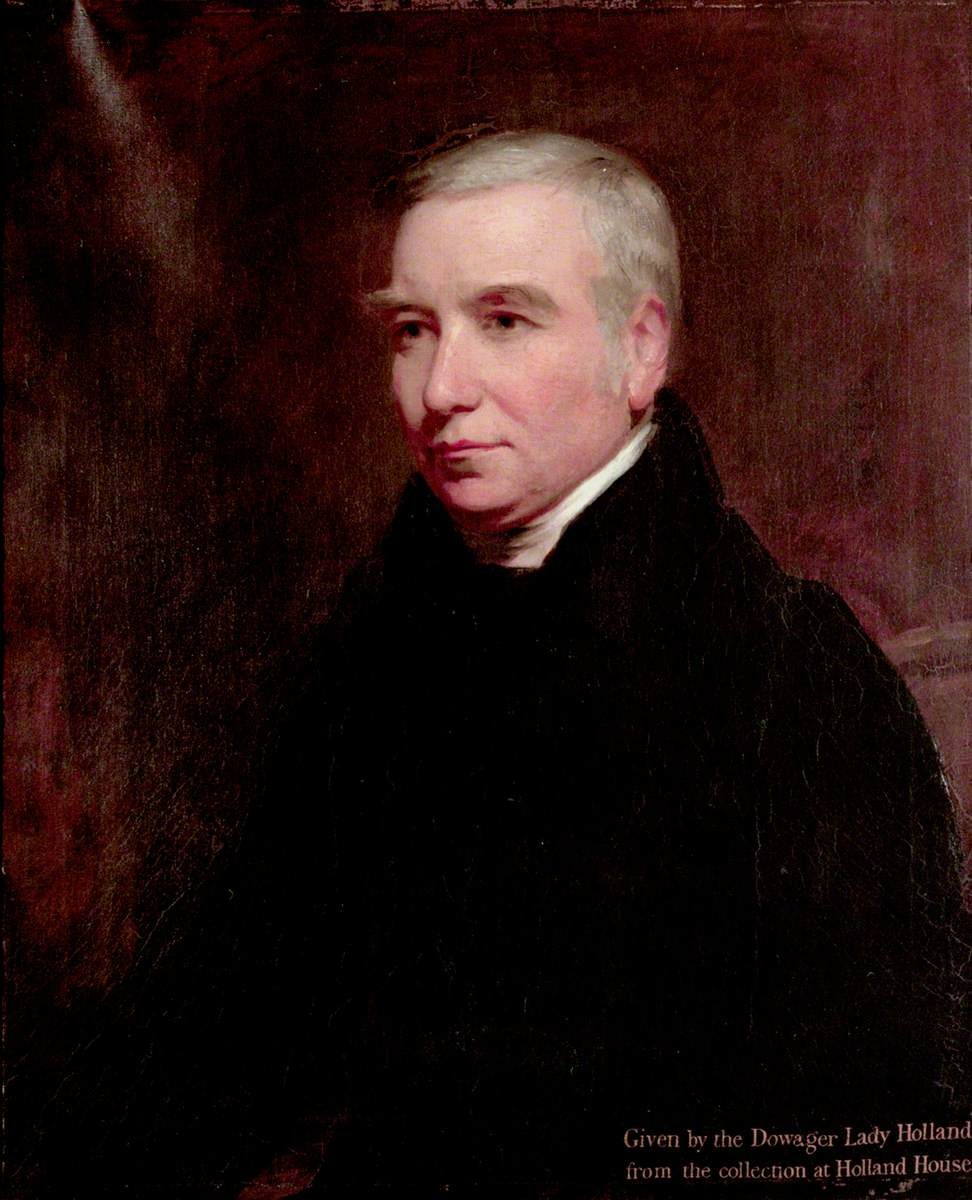

Speaker of the House of Commons of the United Kingdom
- In office 19 February 1835 – 27 May 1839
- Monarchs: William IV; Victoria
- Prime Minister: Robert Peel; William Lamb
- Preceded by: Charles Manners-Sutton
- Succeeded by: Charles Shaw-Lefevre

Judge Advocate General
- In office 12 May 1827 – 21 January 1828
- Monarch: George IV
- Prime Minister: George Canning; The Viscount Goderich
- Preceded by: Sir John Beckett, Bt
- Succeeded by: Sir John Beckett, Bt

Lord Chief Baron of the Court of Exchequer in Scotland
- In office 1830–1832
- Monarch: William IV
- Preceded by: Sir Samuel Shepherd
- Succeeded by: Office abolished

Master of the Mint
- In office 13 June 1834 – 14 November 1834
- Monarch: William IV
- Prime Minister: The Viscount Melbourne
- Preceded by: The Lord Auckland
- Succeeded by: Alexander Baring

Member of Parliament
- In office 1806–1834
- Constituency: Midhurst (1807–1812); Calne (1812–1830); Edinburgh (1832–1834)

Personal details
- Born: 7 November 1776
- Died: 17 April 1858 (aged 81) Colinton House, Midlothian
- Party: Whig
- Spouse(s): Mary Anne Leigh (d. 1874)

James Abercromby, 1st Baron Dunfermline PC FRSE (7 November 1776 – 17 April 1858), was a British barrister and Whig politician. He served as Speaker of the House of Commons between 1835 and 1839, the first Scottish MP to hold that position.

== Background and education ==
Abercromby was the third son of General Sir Ralph Abercromby, who fell at the Battle of Alexandria, and Mary, 1st Baroness Abercromby, daughter of John Menzies of Fernton, Perthshire. He was the younger brother of George Abercromby, 2nd Baron Abercromby and Sir John Abercromby and the elder brother of Alexander Abercromby. He attended the Royal High School, Edinburgh, and was called to the English Bar, Lincoln's Inn, in 1801. He became a commissioner of bankruptcy and later appointed steward of the Duke of Devonshire's estates.

== Legal and political career ==
Abercromby sat as Whig Member of Parliament for Midhurst between 1807 and 1812 and for Calne between 1812 and 1830. He brought forwards two motions for bills to change the representation for Edinburgh in parliament. He received great support but no change was made until the Reform Act 1832. In 1827 he was sworn of the Privy Council and appointed Judge-Advocate-General by George Canning, a post he held until 1828, the last months under the premiership of Lord Goderich.

In 1830, Abercromby was made Lord Chief Baron of the Court of Exchequer in Scotland, a position he retained until 1832, when the office was abolished. He received a pension of £2,000 a year.

In 1831, he was elected a Fellow of the Royal Society of Edinburgh his proposer being John Hope, Lord Hope.

In 1832, he returned to the House of Commons as one of two members for Edinburgh, whose representation had now been increased from one to two members. In July 1834 he entered Lord Melbourne's cabinet as Master of the Mint, but only held the post until November of the same year, when the Whigs lost power.

Abercromby was considered for the speakership of the House of Commons by his party for the 1833 election, but Edward Littleton was eventually chosen instead (he was defeated by Charles Manners-Sutton). However, in the 1835 election he was chosen as the Whig candidate. Due to an evenly balanced House of Commons the election rendered great interest and was fiercely contested. On 19 February 1835, Abercromby was elected, defeating Manners-Sutton by 316 votes to 306. The Dictionary of National Biography writes that "As speaker Abercromby acted with great impartiality while he possessed sufficient decision to quell any serious tendency to disorder." During his tenure a number of reforms for the introduction of private bills were made. In spite of failing health Abercromby continued as speaker until 1839. On his retirement he was raised to the peerage as Baron Dunfermline, of Dunfermline in the County of Fife.

After his retirement Abercromby continued to take an interest in public affairs, specifically those involving the city of Edinburgh. He was one of the originators of the United Industrial School for the support and training of destitute children. In 1841, he was elected as Dean of Faculty at the University of Glasgow. He also wrote a biography of his father, published posthumously in 1861.

== Family ==
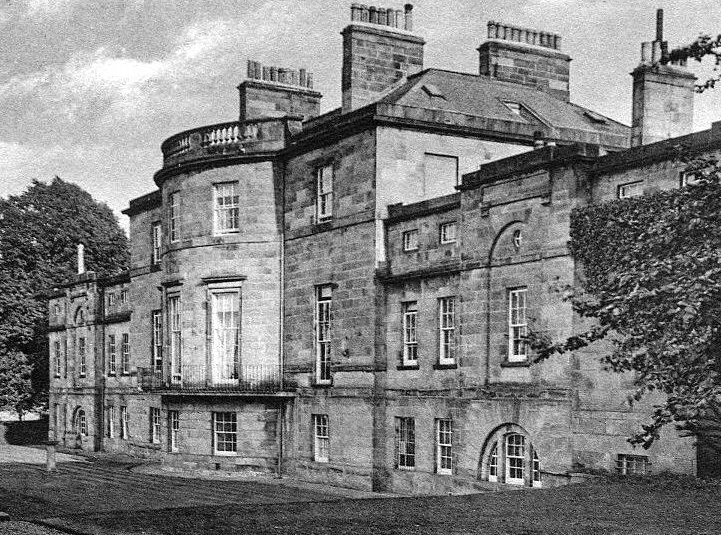
Colinton House, Edinburgh c.1900 (demolished 1925)

Lord Dunfermline married Mary Anne, daughter of Egerton Leigh, of West Hall, in High Legh, on 14 June 1802. He bought property and land in Colinton, Midlothian, in 1840.

He died at Colinton House, on the south-west edge of Edinburgh in April 1858, aged 81, and was buried at Grange Cemetery, Edinburgh. He was succeeded in the barony by his son, Sir Ralph Abercromby, KCB, who was Secretary of Legation at Berlin and served as Envoy Extraordinary and Minister Plenipotentiary to Sardinia between 1840 and 1851 and to The Hague between 1851 and 1858. Lady Dunfermline died in August 1874.

He was the nephew of Robert Bruce, Lord Kennet.

A portrait of James Abercromby as a child by David Allan (1779) is held by the University of Dundee Museum Services

== Arms ==
Coat of arms of James Abercromby, 1st Baron Dunfermline

Crest
A Bee erect proper
Escutcheon
Argent a Fess embattled Gules therefrom issuant in chief a Dexter Arm embowed in Armour proper garnished Or encircled by a Wreath of Laurel the hand supporting the French Standard in bend sinister also proper in base (for Abercromby) a Chevron indented Gules between three Boars' Heads erased Azure
Supporters
On either side a Greyhound per fess Argent and Or each plain collared with a Line reflexed over the back Gules and suspended from the collar a Shield Azure charged with the Speaker's Mace in pale gold and charged on the shoulder with a Thistle proper
Motto
Vive ut vivas

== Sources ==
- Burke, John, History of the Commoners of Great Britain and Ireland, vol.iii, London, 1838, pp. 1–2.
- Anderson, William, The Scottish Nation, Edinburgh, 1867, vol.iv, p. 105.
- Chisholm, Hugh, ed. (1911). "Dunfermline, James Abercromby, 1st Baron" . Encyclopædia Britannica. Vol. 8 (11th ed.). Cambridge University Press. p. 678.

Parliament of the United Kingdom
Preceded by Henry Watkin Williams-Wynn; William Plunket	Member of Parliament for Midhurst; 1807–1812; With: Samuel Smith 1807; Thomas Thompson 1807–12	Succeeded by Thomas Thompson; George Smith
Preceded by Joseph Jekyll; Henry Smith	Member of Parliament for Calne; 1812–1830; With: Joseph Jekyll 1812–16; Sir James Macdonald, Bt 1816–30	Succeeded by Sir James Macdonald; Thomas Babington Macaulay
Preceded by Robert Adam Dundas	Member of Parliament for Edinburgh; 1832–1839; With: Francis Jeffrey 1832–34; Sir John Campbell 1834–39	Succeeded by Sir John Campbell; Thomas Babington Macaulay
Legal offices
Preceded by Sir John Beckett, Bt	Judge-Advocate-General; 1827–1828	Succeeded by Sir John Beckett, Bt
Preceded by Sir Samuel Shepherd	Lord Chief Baron of the Court of Exchequer in Scotland; 1830–1832	Office abolished
Political offices
Preceded by The Lord Auckland	Master of the Mint; 1834–1835	Succeeded by Alexander Baring
Preceded by Charles Manners-Sutton	Speaker of the House of Commons of the United Kingdom; 1835–1839	Succeeded by Charles Shaw-Lefevre
Peerage of the United Kingdom
New creation	Baron Dunfermline; 1839–1858	Succeeded by Ralph Abercromby
