= Baron Dunfermline =

Title in the Peerage of the United Kingdom

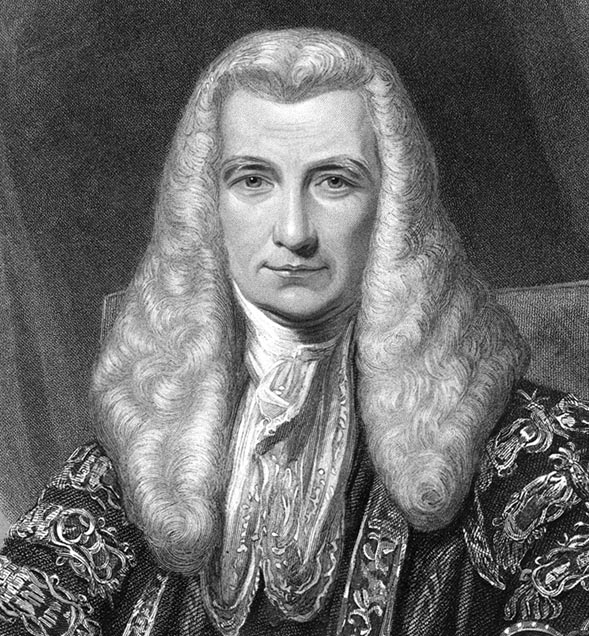
James Abercromby, 1st Baron Dunfermline.

Baron Dunfermline, of Dunfermline in the County of Fife, was a title in the Peerage of the United Kingdom. It was created on 7 June 1839 for the Whig politician and former Speaker of the House of Commons, James Abercromby. He was the third son of Sir Ralph Abercromby and Mary Anne Abercromby, 1st Baroness Abercromby (see Baron Abercromby for earlier history of the family). The title became extinct on the death of his son, the second Baron, in 1868.

== Barons Dunfermline (1839) ==
- James Abercromby, 1st Baron Dunfermline (1776–1858)
- Ralph Abercromby, 2nd Baron Dunfermline (1803–1868)

== See also ==
- Baron Abercromby
