= John Fox-Strangways =

British diplomat, Whig politician and courtier

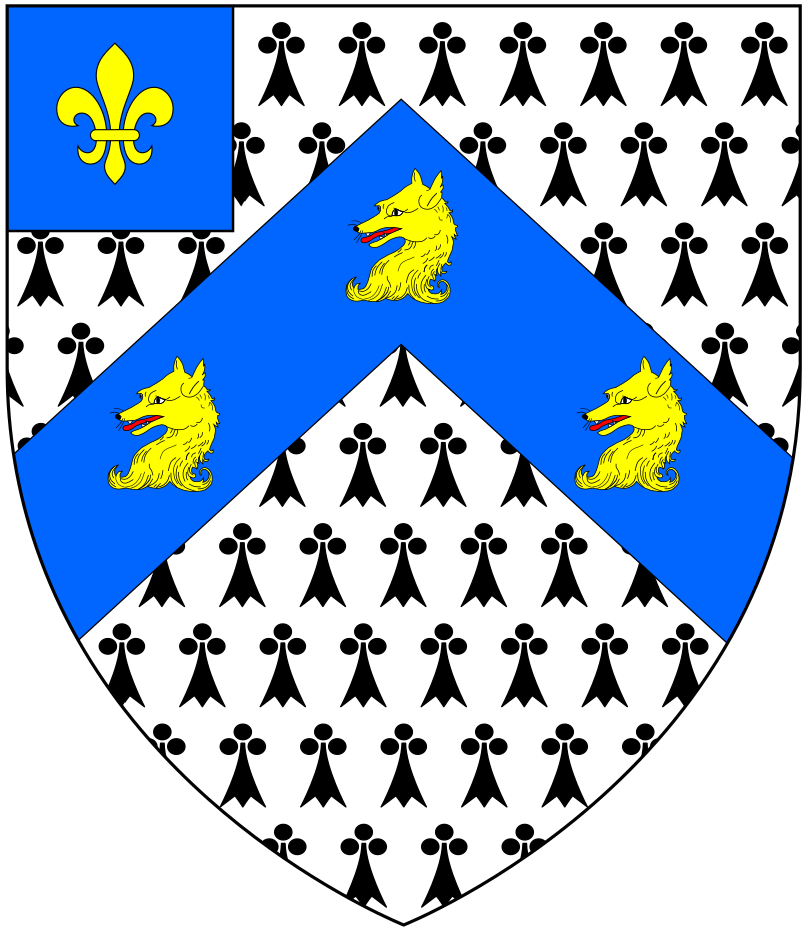
Left: Arms of Strangways: Sable, two lions passant paly of six argent and gules. The Earl of Ilchester's arms are Strangways quartering Fox; right: Canting arms of Fox: Ermine, on a chevron azure three fox's heads and necks erased or on a canton of the second a fleur-de-lys of the third

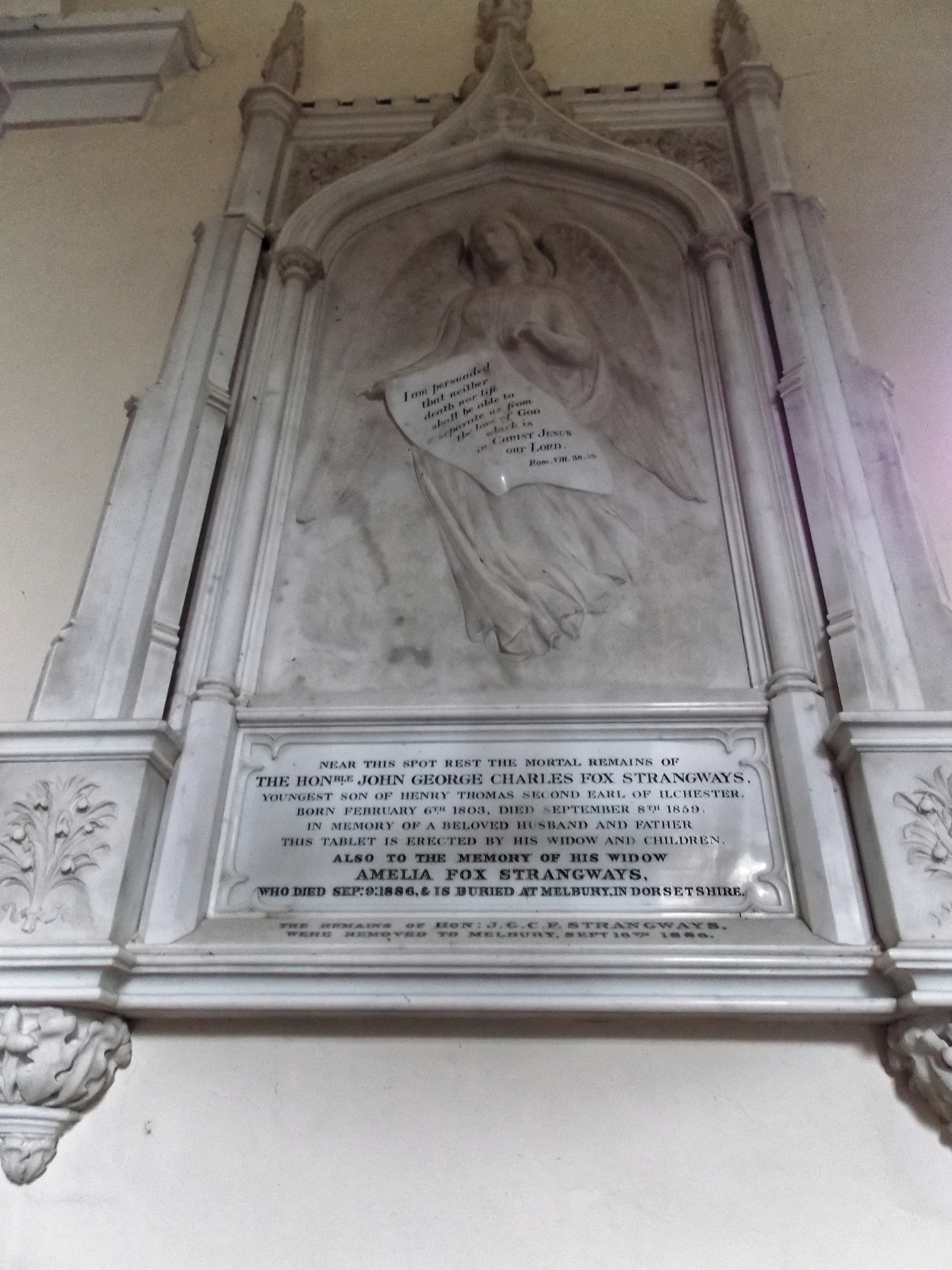
Mural monument to Hon. John George Charles Fox-Strangways (1803–1859), Ilchester Chapel of All Saints Church, Farley, Wiltshire

The Honourable John George Charles Fox-Strangways (6 February 1803 – 8 September 1859) was a British diplomat, Whig politician, and courtier.

== Early life ==
Fox-Strangways was the posthumous third son of Henry Fox-Strangways, 2nd Earl of Ilchester and his second wife, Maria Digby, daughter of The Very Reverend William Digby. The 3rd and 4th Earls of Ilchester were respectively his elder half-brother and brother. Louisa Fitzmaurice-Petty, Marchioness of Lansdowne was his half-sister.

== Political career ==
Fox-Strangways was elected Member of Parliament (MP) for Calne in 1836, a seat he held until 1837. He then represented Dorset until 1841.

Fox-Strangways was also in the Foreign Office and served as a Gentleman Usher to Queen Adelaide.

== Marriage and children ==
Fox-Strangways married Amelia, daughter of Edward Marjoribanks, in 1844. They had two children:

- Lady Maria Georgiana Julia Fox-Strangways (died 12 October 1922), married Arthur Hood, 2nd Viscount Bridport.
- Henry Edward Fox-Strangways, 5th Earl of Ilchester (13 September 1847 - 6 December 1905)

Fox-Strangways died in September 1859, aged 56. His wife died in September 1886.

Their son, Henry, succeeded his uncle William Fox-Strangways, 4th Earl of Ilchester in the earldom of Ilchester in 1865.

Parliament of the United Kingdom
Preceded by The Earl of Kerry	Member of Parliament for Calne; 1836–1837	Succeeded by The Earl of Shelburne
Preceded by Lord Ashley; Hon. William Ponsonby; Henry Charles Sturt	Member of Parliament for Dorset; 1837–1841; With: Lord Ashley; Henry Charles Sturt	Succeeded by Lord Ashley; Henry Charles Sturt; George Bankes
