= Strangways =

Strangways is a surname, and may refer to:

- A. H. Fox Strangways (Arthur Henry Fox Strangways 1859–1948), a music critic who wrote for The Observer
- Henry Strangways (Henry Bull Templar Strangways 1832–1920), lawyer, politician and Premier of South Australia
- Henry Strangways (pirate) (died 1562) aka Henry Strangwish
- Thomas Bewes Strangways (1809-1859) South Australian founding settler and explorer
- Fox-Strangways, surname
- John Strangways, a fictional character in the James Bond series

== See also ==
- Strangways, Wiltshire, a suburb of Larkhill, Wiltshire, England
- Strangways, Victoria, a locality in the Shire of Mount Alexander, Australia
- Strangways crater or Strangways River, Northern Territory, Australia
- Strange Ways (disambiguation), also for Strangeways
