= Charles Manners-Sutton, 1st Viscount Canterbury =

British politician (1780–1845)

The Right Honourable The Viscount Canterbury GCB PC
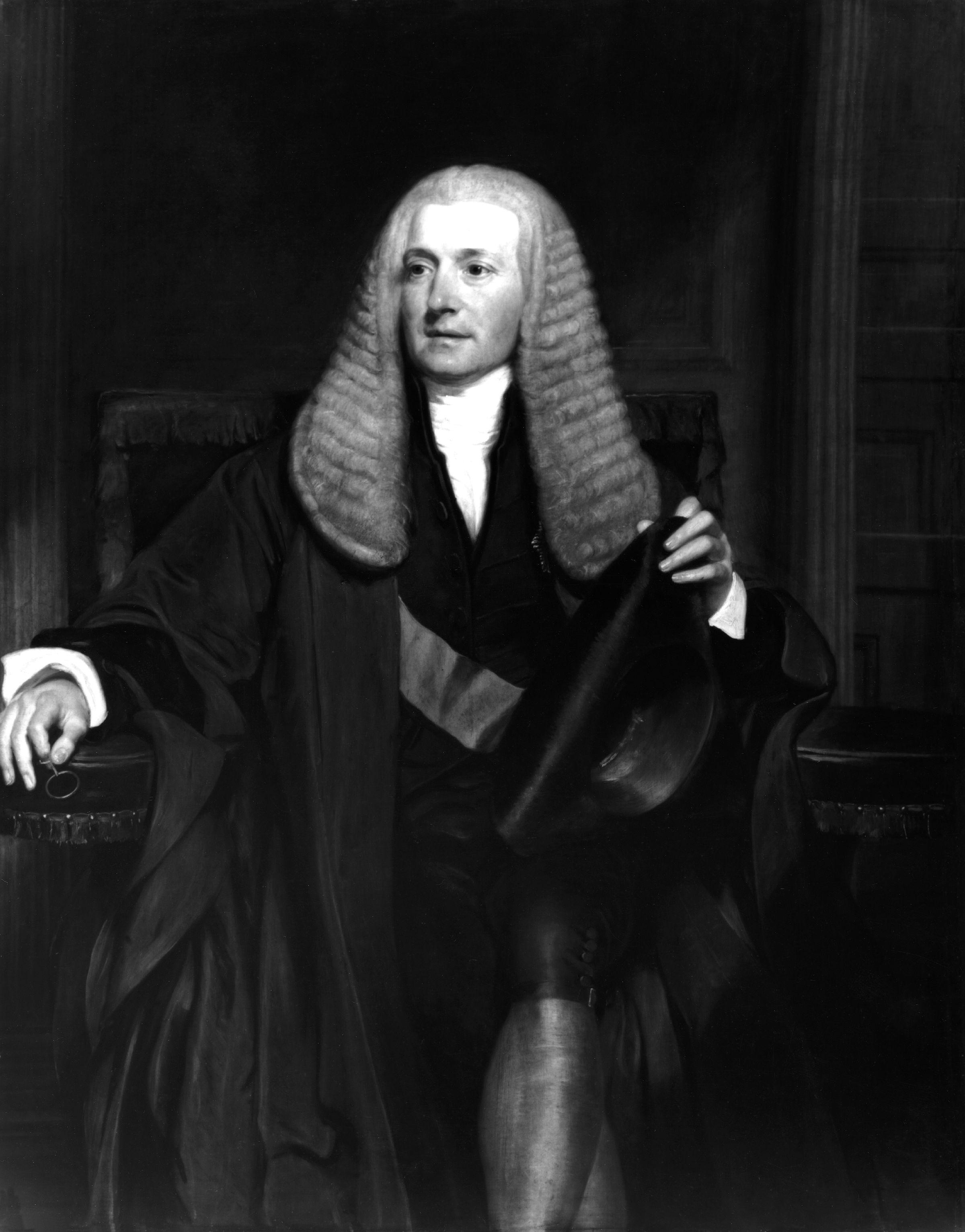
- 1833 portrait of Canterbury by Henry William Pickersgill

Speaker of the House of Commons of the United Kingdom
- In office 2 June 1817 – 19 February 1835
- Monarch: George III; George IV; William IV
- Prime Minister: Robert Jenkinson; George Canning; Frederick John Robinson; Arthur Wellesley; Charles Grey; William Lamb; Arthur Wellesley; Robert Peel
- Preceded by: Charles Abbot
- Succeeded by: Hon. James Abercromby

Personal details
- Born: 9 January 1780 Screveton, Nottinghamshire
- Died: 21 July 1845 (aged 65) Southwick Crescent, Paddington, London
- Party: Tory
- Spouse(s): (1) Lucy Denison (d. 1815) (2) Ellen Power (d. 1845)
- Children: 4, including John, 3rd Viscount Canterbury
- Parent: Charles Manners-Sutton (father)
- Education: Trinity College, Cambridge

Charles Manners-Sutton, 1st Viscount Canterbury, GCB, PC (9 January 1780 – 21 July 1845) was a British Tory politician who served as Speaker of the House of Commons from 1817 to 1835.

== Background and education ==
A member of the Manners family headed by the Duke of Rutland, Manners-Sutton was born at Screveton, Nottinghamshire, the son of the Most Reverend Charles Manners-Sutton, Archbishop of Canterbury, fourth son of Lord George Manners-Sutton, third son of John Manners, 3rd Duke of Rutland. His mother was Mary, daughter of Thomas Thoroton, of Screveton, Nottinghamshire, while Thomas Manners-Sutton, 1st Baron Manners, Lord Chancellor of Ireland, was his uncle.

He was educated at Eton College and Trinity College, Cambridge (matriculated 1798, graduated B.A. 1802, M.A. 1805, LL.D. 1824). He was admitted to Lincoln's Inn in 1802, and called to the Bar in 1806.

== Political career ==
In 1806 Manners-Sutton was elected Tory member of parliament for Scarborough, a seat he would hold until 1832, and then sat for Cambridge University from 1832 to 1835. He served as Judge Advocate General under Spencer Perceval and Lord Liverpool from 1809 to 1817 and was admitted to the Privy Council in 1809.

Manners-Sutton was elected Speaker of the House of Commons in the 1817 election, holding the post for the next eighteen years. Antonia Fraser described Manners-Sutton as "a fine, friendly, genial figure, if inclined to pomposity (but that was a forgivable offence in a Speaker)." Manners-Sutton, notably, was Speaker during the passing of the Reform Act 1832. Following the King's prorogation of Parliament, Manners-Sutton led an angry group of MPs to the House of Lords to hear his proclamation. Manners-Sutton himself was said to be "red-faced and quivering with rage" at the news.

When Lord Grey resigned as Prime Minister in May 1832, this caused a period of political unrest known as the Days of May. The King asked the Duke of Wellington to form a government to replace Grey's, but he was reluctant to do so. Nevertheless, according to Fraser, "There was the possibility that... Charles Manners-Sutton might prove an acceptable anodyne leader because, by the nature of his office, he was not tarred by the brush of his own anti-Reform declarations." Manners-Sutton spent three hours outlining his views on the matter at "exhaustive and exhausting length" during a crucial meeting of the Tories at Apsley House. Following the meeting, Lyndhurst flung back his chair and exclaimed that he refused to listen any longer to such "a damned tiresome old bitch." Manners-Sutton was only the third candidate in contention to lead a Tory administration, behind Wellington and Sir Robert Peel. In the end, "he was understood to have declined" the opportunity to head the proposed Tory administration.

After the passing of the Reform Act, Manners-Sutton was persuaded to postpone his retirement as Speaker by the government. Objecting to him as an opponent of the reform, the Radicals opposed his re-election in the 1833 election, nominating Edward Littleton, whom Manners-Sutton defeated by 210 votes. In the 1835 election the Whigs opposed Manners-Sutton, nominating James Abercromby, who defeated Manners-Sutton by 10 votes.

In 1835 Manners-Sutton was appointed High Commissioner for Canada, but did not take up the post. He was appointed a Knight Grand Cross of the Order of the Bath in 1833 and in 1835 he was raised to the peerage as Baron Bottesford, of Bottesford in the County of Leicester, and Viscount Canterbury, of the City of Canterbury.

== Family ==
Lord Canterbury was twice married.

He married as his first wife Lucy Maria Charlotte, daughter of John Denison, on 8 July 1811. They had two sons and a daughter:

- Charles John Manners-Sutton, 2nd Viscount Canterbury (1812–1869)
- John Henry Thomas Manners-Sutton, 3rd Viscount Canterbury (1814–1877)
- Charlotte Matilda Manners-Sutton (1815–1898)

After his first-wife's early death at Ossington, Nottinghamshire, in December 1815, he married as his second wife Ellen, daughter of Edmund Power and widow of John Home Purves, on 6 December 1828. They had one daughter:

- Frances Diana Manners-Sutton (1829–1874)

Ellen Manners-Sutton played a prominent role as political hostess in Speaker's House. Her sister was Marguerite Gardiner, Countess of Blessington.

Lord Canterbury died at Southwick Crescent, Paddington, London, in July 1845, aged 65, from apoplexy, and was succeeded by his eldest son, Charles. His second wife only survived him by a few months and died at Clifton, Gloucestershire, in November 1845.

== Arms ==
Coat of arms of Charles Manners-Sutton, 1st Viscount Canterbury
Escutcheon Quarterly, 1st & 4th: Argent, a canton sable (Sutton) 2nd & 3rd: Or, two bars azure, a chief quarterly azure and gules, the 1st and 4th quarters charged with two fleurs-de-lis or, and the 2nd and 3rd a lion of England (Manners) Supporters On either side a Unicorn Argent armed maned tufted and unguled Or, around the neck of the dexter supporter a Chain Or pendent therefrom an Escutcheon Azure charged with a Mace erect Gold, around the neck of the sinister supporter a like Chain pendent therefrom an Escutcheon also Azure charged with an Archiepiscopal Mitre also gold jewelled proper Motto Pour y Parvenir

Parliament of the United Kingdom
Preceded by Edmund Phipps; Lord Robert Manners	Member of Parliament for Scarborough; 1806–1832; With: Edmund Phipps 1806–1818, 1820–1832; Viscount Normanby 1818–1820	Succeeded by Sir John Vanden-Bempde-Johnstone, Bt; Sir George Cayley, Bt
Preceded by Henry Goulburn; William Yates Peel	Member of Parliament for Cambridge University; 1832–1835; With: Henry Goulburn	Succeeded by Henry Goulburn; Charles Law
Legal offices
Preceded by Hon. Richard Ryder	Judge Advocate General; 1809–1817	Succeeded by John Beckett
Political offices
Preceded by Charles Abbot	Speaker of the House of Commons of the United Kingdom; 1817–1835	Succeeded by Hon. James Abercromby
Peerage of the United Kingdom
New creation	Viscount Canterbury; 1835–1845	Succeeded by Charles John Manners-Sutton
