= Ralph Abercromby, 2nd Baron Dunfermline =

British diplomat

The Right Honourable The Lord Dunfermline KCB FRSE
- Born: Ralph Abercromby; 6 April 1803
- Died: 2 July 1868 (aged 65); Colinton House, Midlothian, Scotland
- Spouse(s): Lady Mary Elliot-Murray-Kynynmound (m. 1838)
- Father: James Abercromby, 1st Baron Dunfermline
- Mother: Lady Mary Anne Leigh
- Occupation: Nobleman, diplomat

Personal details
- Education: Eton College

Ralph Abercromby, 2nd Baron Dunfermline KCB FRSE (6 April 1803 – 2 July 1868) was a Scottish nobleman and diplomat, styled The Honourable from 1839 to 1858.

== Life ==
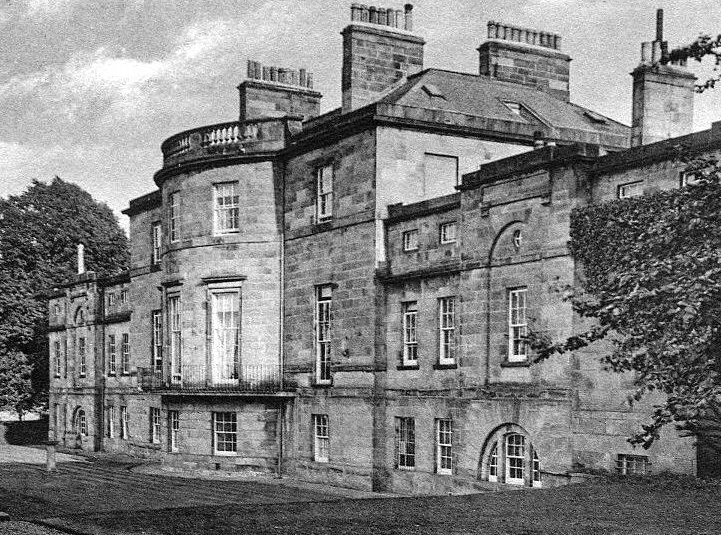
Colinton House, Edinburgh c.1900 (demolished 1925)

Ralph Abercromby was the son and heir of James Abercromby, a barrister and Whig politician, and Lady Mary Anne (Marianne) Leigh. Abercromby was educated at Eton and Peterhouse, Cambridge.

He entered the Diplomatic Service, becoming an attaché at Frankfurt in 1821 and a précis writer in the Foreign Office in 1827. He was Secretary of Legation at Berlin from 1831 to 1835, and Minister at Florence from 1835 to 1838. On 18 September 1838 he married Lady Mary Elizabeth Gilberta Elliot-Murray-Kynynmound, daughter of the Earl of Minto. From 1838 to 1840 he was Minister to the German Confederation, from 1840 to 1851 Minister at Turin, and from 1851 to 1858 Minister at The Hague.

In 1851 he was awarded a Knight Commander of the Bath (KCB). Upon his father's death in 1858 he succeeded to the Barony, as 2nd Baron Dunfermline, and lived at the family home Colinton House, Midlothian (now in Edinburgh). In 1863 he was elected a Fellow of the Royal Society of Edinburgh, upon the nomination of Sir John M'Neill.

He died without a male heir in 1868, and the Barony became extinct.

Diplomatic posts
| Preceded by George Hamilton Seymour | British Resident to Tuscany; 1835–1838 | Succeeded by Henry Fox |
| Preceded by Henry Fox | British Minister to the Germanic Confederation; 1838–1840 | Succeeded by William Fox-Strangways |
| Preceded by Augustus Foster | British Minister at Turin; 1840–1851 | Succeeded by James Hudson |
| Preceded by Sir Edward Cromwell Disbrowe | British Minister to the Netherlands; 1851–1858 | Succeeded by The Lord Napier |
Peerage of the United Kingdom
| Preceded by James Abercromby | Baron Dunfermline; 1858–1868 | Extinct |
