= Strangeways (surname) =

Strangeways is a surname. Notable people with the surname include:

- David Strangeways, British officer involved with allied deceptions during World War II
- James Strangeways, English politician of the 15th century
- Thomas Strangeways, British physician and founder of Strangeways Research Laboratory

== Fictional characters ==
- Nigel Strangeways, a fictional detective in works of Cecil Day-Lewis writing as Nicholas Blake
