= Giles Fox-Strangways, 6th Earl of Ilchester =

British peer and philanthropist (1874–1959)

Portrait by Walter Stoneman, 1922

Giles Stephen Holland Fox-Strangways, 6th Earl of Ilchester GBE DL (31 May 1874 – 29 October 1959), styled Lord Stavordale until 1905, was a British peer and philanthropist.

== Background and education ==
Fox-Strangways was the eldest child of Henry Fox-Strangways, 5th Earl of Ilchester, by Lady Mary Eleanor Anne Dawson, daughter of Richard Dawson, 1st Earl of Dartrey. He was educated at Eton and Christ Church, Oxford and was an officer in the Coldstream Guards, promoted to Lieutenant 5 March 1902.

== Career ==
For Dorsetshire Giles was justice of the peace and deputy lieutenant; he also received a Legion of Honour and O.B.E. in 1919. From 1922 to 1959, Lord Ilchester was a Trustee of the National Portrait Gallery (and Chairman from 1941–59) and of the British Museum from 1931–59. He was also a Member of the Royal Commission on the Historical Monuments of England from 1939–59 (and Chairman from 1943–59), President of the London Library from 1940–52, President of the Royal Literary Fund from 1941–51, President of the Roxburghe Club in 1940 and a Steward of the Jockey Club from 1937–40. Lord Ilchester was awarded for his work by being appointed a GBE in 1950.

== Holland House ==
The family's London home, Holland House, was built in 1605 and burnt down during the Blitz. The building remained a burned-out ruin until 1952, when he sold the house and fifty-two acres to London County Council for £250,000. The land and its gardens became Holland Park, a substantial public green space in Kensington. He wrote various works on the history of the house, including:

- Fox-Strangways, Giles (6th Earl of Ilchester), The House of the Hollands 1605–1820, London, 1937
- Fox-Strangways, Giles (6th Earl of Ilchester), Chronicles of Holland House, 1820–1900, London, 1937
- Fox-Strangways, Giles (6th Earl of Ilchester), Catalogue of pictures belonging to the Earl of Ilchester at Holland House, London, 1904

== Marriage and children ==
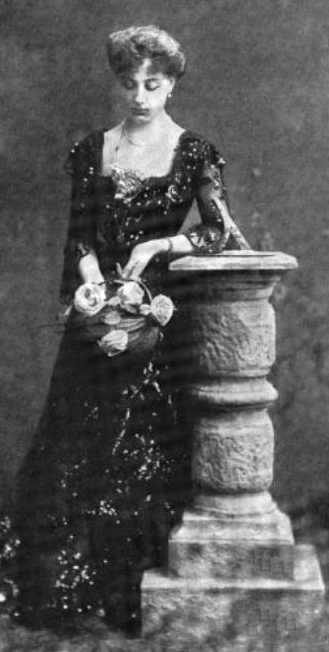
Lady Helen Vane-Tempest-Stewart in 1901

Lord Ilchester married Lady Helen Vane-Tempest-Stewart, only daughter of Charles Vane-Tempest-Stewart, 6th Marquess of Londonderry. The society wedding took place at St Peter's Church, Eaton Square, London, on 25 January 1902, and was conducted by the Archbishop of Armagh (Primate of All Ireland). It was attended by Prince Arthur, Duke of Connaught and Strathearn, his daughter Princess Margaret of Connaught and Prince George, Duke of Cambridge.

The couple had four children:

- Lady Mary Theresa Fox-Strangways (1903–1948), married Sir John Herbert.
- Edward Henry Charles James "Harry" Fox-Strangways, 7th Earl of Ilchester (1905–1964).
- The Honourable John Denzil Fox-Strangways (1908–1961)
- Lady (Mabel) Edith Fox-Strangways (1918-1995), married Ivor Grosvenor Guest, 2nd Viscount Wimborne.

The Countess of Ilchester died in January 1956, aged 79. Lord Ilchester survived her by three years and died in October 1959, aged 85. His elder son Edward (known as "Harry") succeeded in the earldom.

== Arms ==
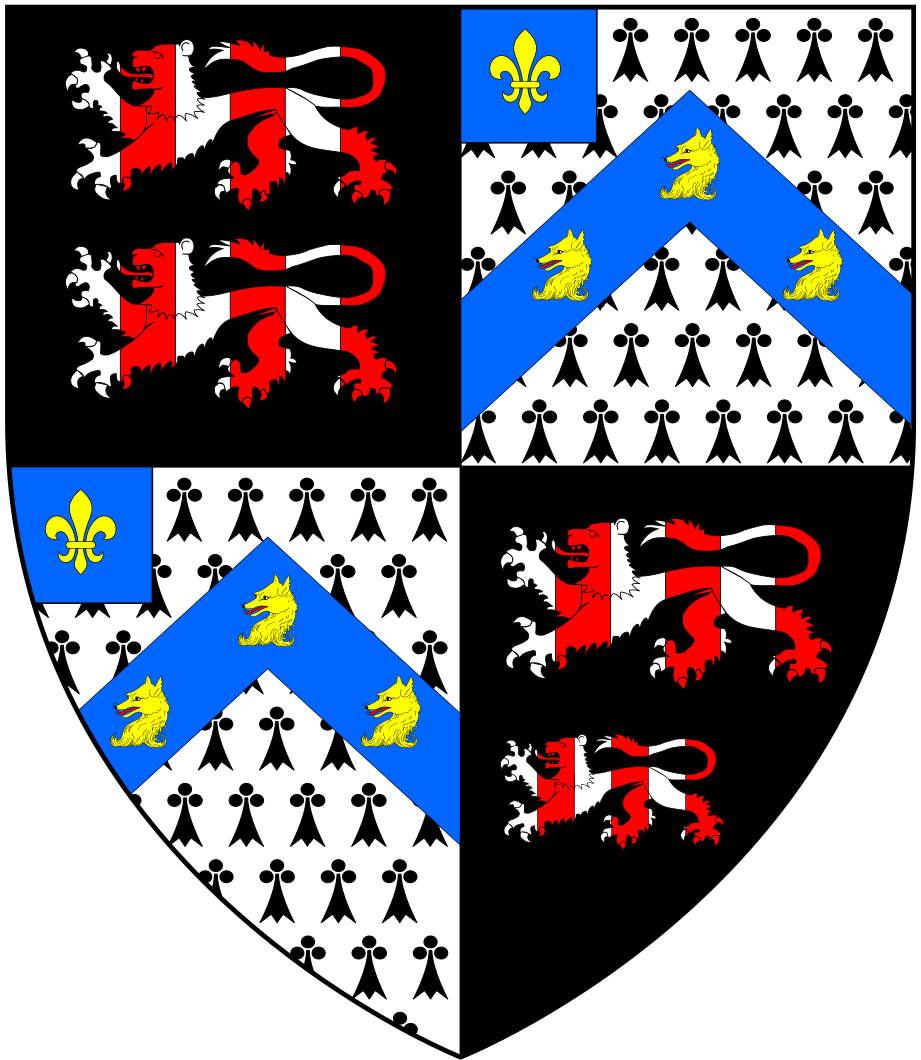
Arms of Fox-Strangways

The arms of the head of the Fox-Strangways family are blazoned "Quarterly of four: 1st & 4th: Sable, two lions passant paly of six argent and gules" (Strangways); "2nd & 3rd: Ermine, on a chevron azure three foxes' heads and necks erased or on a canton of the second a fleur-de-lys of the third" (Fox).

Peerage of Great Britain
Preceded by Henry Fox-Strangways	Earl of Ilchester; 1905–1959	Succeeded by Harry Fox-Strangways
