= Mary Fox-Strangways, Countess of Ilchester =

English noblewoman,1852-1935

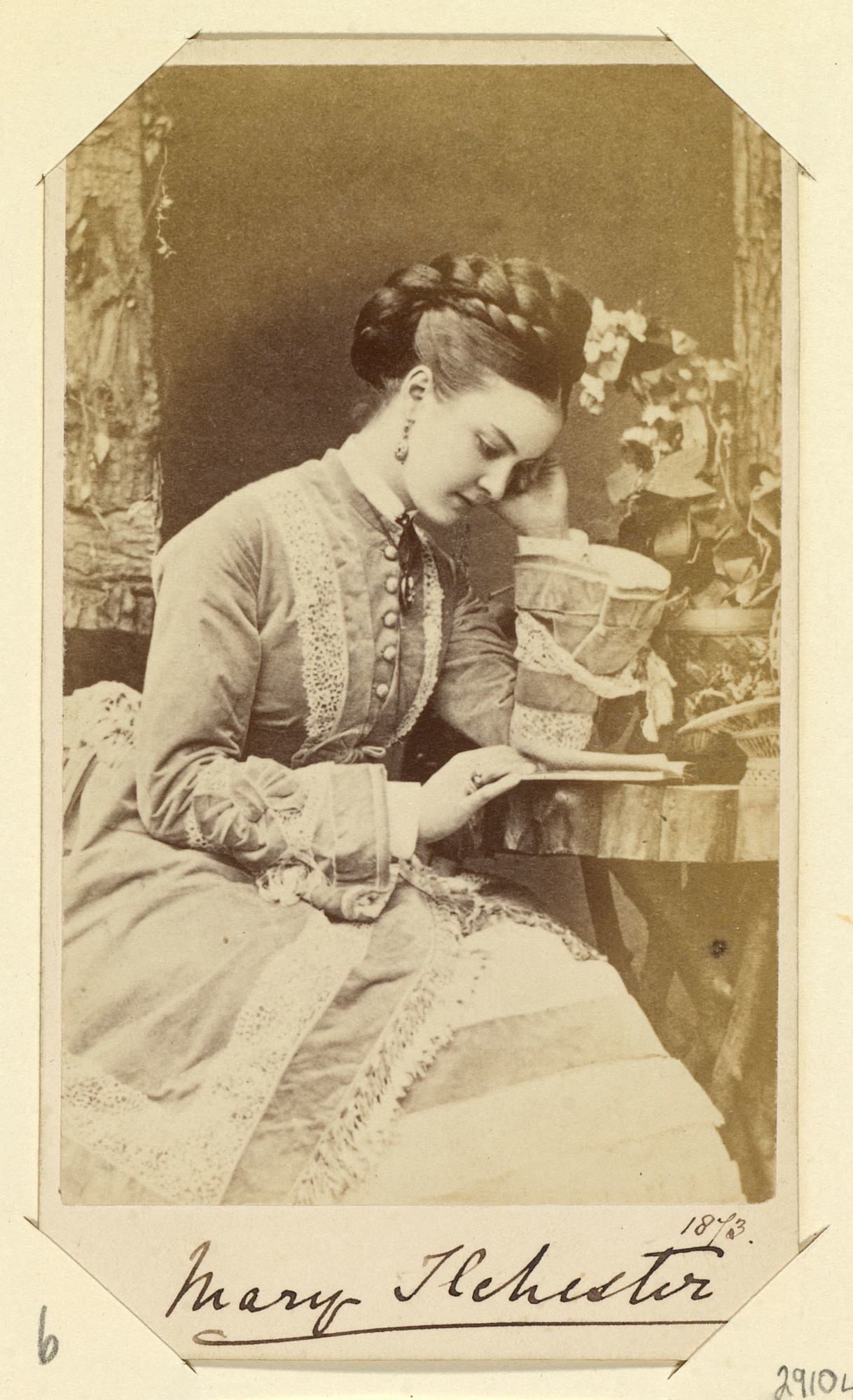
Lady Mary Eleanor, Countess of Ilchester in 1873

Mary Fox-Strangways, Countess of Ilchester (born Hon. Mary Eleanor Anne Dawson; 6 January 1852 – 1935) was an Anglo-Irish noblewoman, an anti-suffragist and a leading figure in London society. She was the wife of Henry Fox-Strangways, 5th Earl of Ilchester.

== Life ==
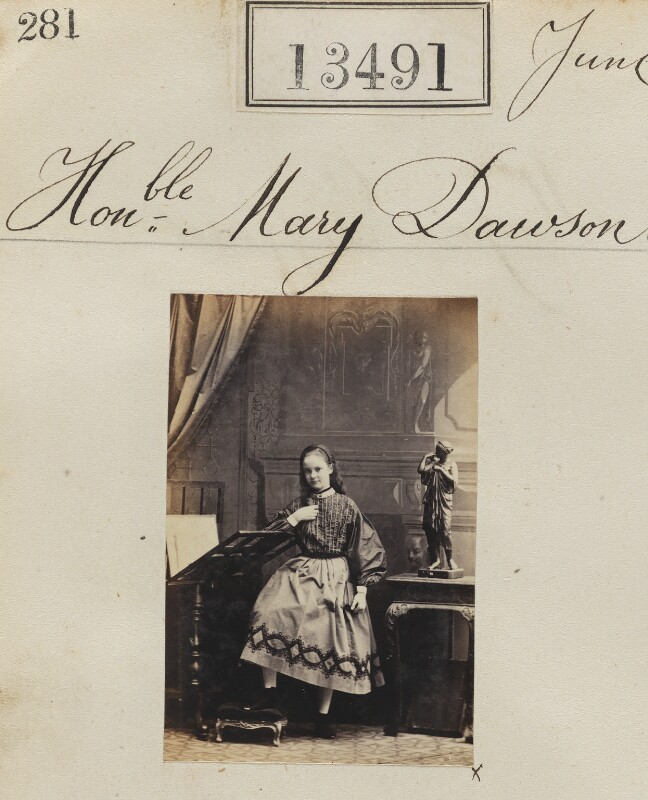
1863 portrait by Camille Silvy

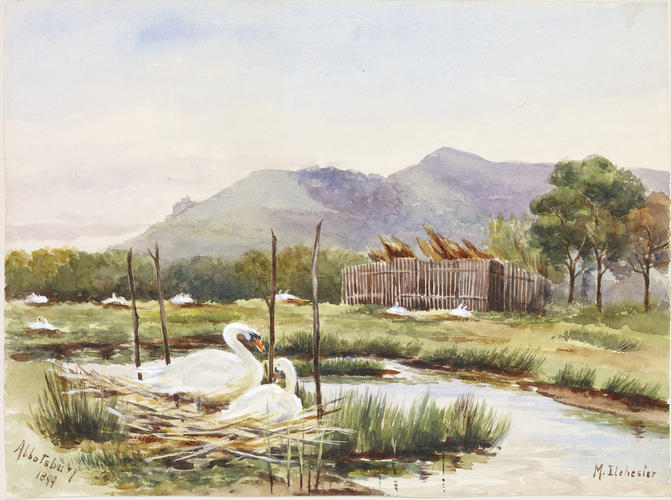
Painting of Swannery and Abbotsbury by Lady Mary Eleanor, Countess of Ilchester in 1899

Mary Eleanor Anne Dawson was born in 1852 in St George Hanover Square, Westminster, the fourth child and only daughter of Richard Dawson, 1st Earl of Dartrey (then Lord Cremorne) and Augusta Stanley.

She married Henry Fox-Strangways, 5th Earl of Ilchester on 8 February 1872 and became the Countess of Ilchester. The couple had three children, two of whom predeceased her: Giles, 6th Earl of Ilchester (1874–1959), Hon. Denzil Vesey (1879–1901; who died of pneumonia in Paris) and Lady Muriel Augusta Digby (1876–1920).

The family lived at Holland House after the Countess' husband took over the property in 1899. The Ilchesters also owned the Abbotsbury Gardens. The Countess published a catalogue of the garden's 4,000 plants in 1899. In 1902, she edited and published a collection of the letters of Lady Sarah Lennox.

The Countess was active in the anti-suffrage cause. She founded the London branch of the Women's National Anti-Suffrage League in South Kensington in 1908. Together with the Duchess of Montrose and others, she published an article in the Pall Mall Magazine titled "Why Women Should Not Have the Vote, From the Woman’s Point of View." A member of the Primrose League, she advocated for Conservative politics. She also served as president of the Women's Unionist and Tariff Reform Association.

She died in 1935 at Holland House, Kensington.
