= 1817 Speaker of the British House of Commons election =

- 2 June 1817
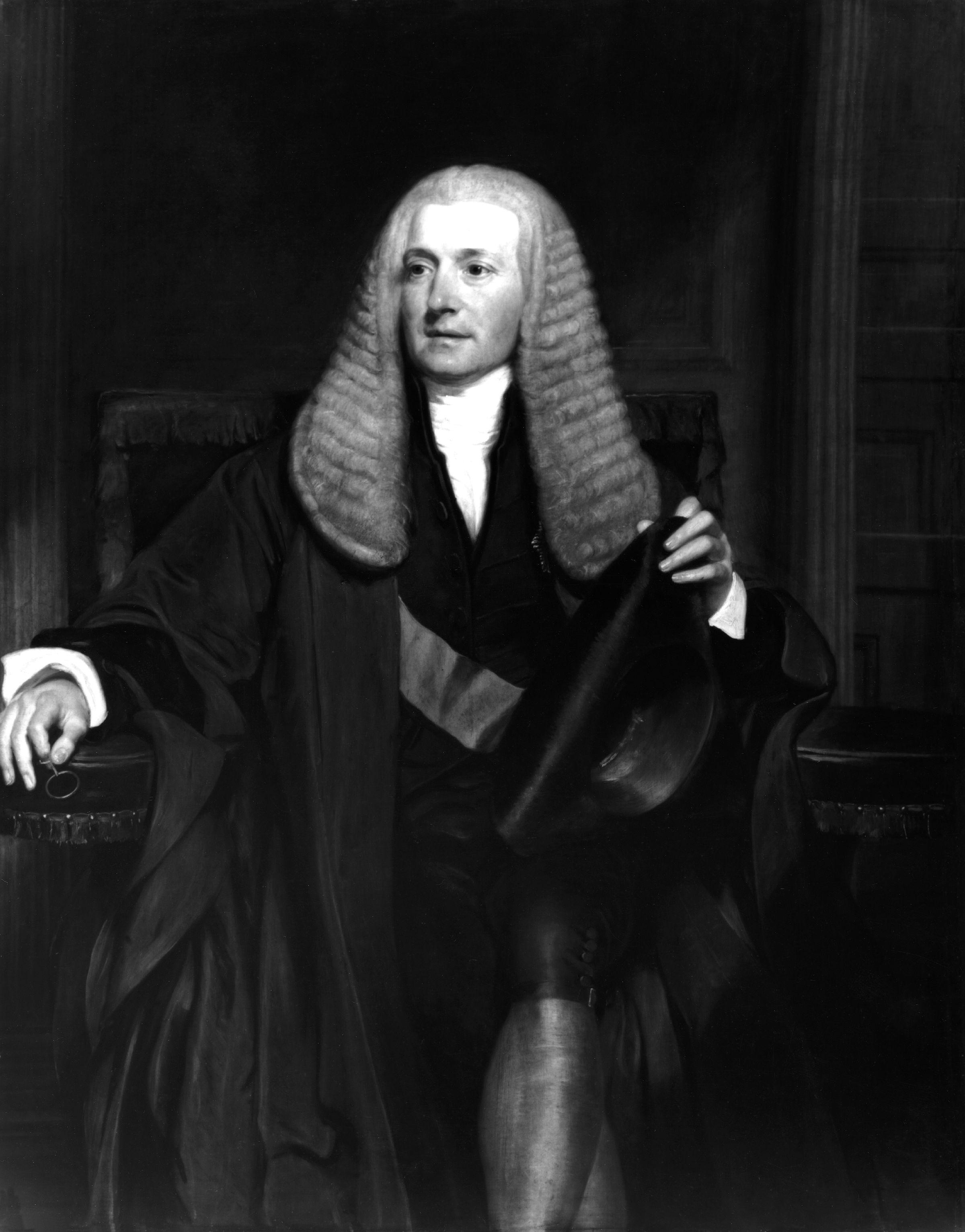

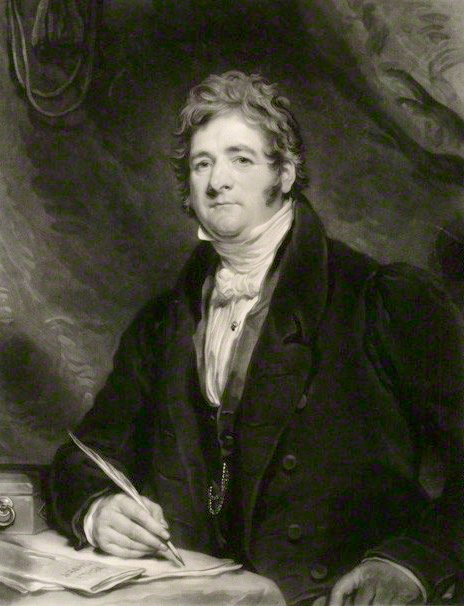
Candidate	Charles Manners-Sutton	Charles Williams-Wynn
Party	Tory	Tory
Popular vote	312	152
Percentage	67.2%	32.8%
Candidate's seat	Scarborough	Montgomeryshire
Speaker before election
Charles Abbot
Elected Speaker
Charles Manners-Sutton

The 1817 election of the Speaker of the House of Commons occurred on 2 June 1817.

The incumbent Speaker Charles Abbot had resigned due to ill health.

Charles Manners-Sutton was proposed by Sir John Nicholl and seconded by E. J. Littleton.

Charles Williams-Wynn was proposed by William Dickinson and seconded by Sir Matthew White Ridley.

Both candidates addressed the House. A debate followed.

On the motion "That the Right Honourable Charles Manners Sutton do take the chair of this House as Speaker," Manners-Sutton was elected by 312 votes to 152 (Hansard gives the votes against as 150).
