= William Fox-Strangways, 4th Earl of Ilchester =

British diplomat, Whig politician and art collector

The Right Honourable The Earl of Ilchester FRS

Under-Secretary of State for Foreign Affairs
- In office 18 April 1835 – 7 March 1840
- Monarchs: William IV; Victoria
- Prime Minister: The Viscount Melbourne
- Preceded by: Viscount Mahon
- Succeeded by: Lord Leveson

Envoy Extraordinary and Minister Plenipotentiary to the German Confederation
- In office 17 March 1840 – 1849
- Monarch: Victoria
- Preceded by: Ralph Abercromby
- Succeeded by: The Lord Cowley

Personal details
- Born: 7 May 1795
- Died: 10 January 1865 (aged 69)
- Party: Whig
- Spouse: Sophia Penelope Sheffield
- Parent: Henry Fox-Strangways, 2nd Earl of Ilchester (father)
- Education: Christ Church, Oxford

William Thomas Horner Fox-Strangways, 4th Earl of Ilchester FRS (7 May 1795 – 10 January 1865), styled The Honourable William Fox-Strangways until 1858, was a British diplomat, Whig politician and art collector. He served as Under-Secretary of State for Foreign Affairs under Lord Melbourne from 1835 to 1840 and was Envoy Extraordinary and Minister Plenipotentiary to the German Confederation from 1840 to 1849.

== Background and education ==
Fox-Strangways was the son of Henry Thomas Fox-Strangways, 2nd Earl of Ilchester, and his second wife Maria Digby, daughter of William Digby. Henry Fox-Strangways, 3rd Earl of Ilchester, was his elder half-brother and John Fox-Strangways his younger brother. He was educated at Christ Church, Oxford, taking a BA in 1816 and an MA in 1820.

== Political and diplomatical career ==
Fox-Strangways served as an attaché at the British embassies in Saint Petersburg, Constantinople, Naples and The Hague, as Secretary of Legation in Florence and Naples and as Secretary of Embassy in Vienna. In 1835 he was appointed Under-Secretary of State for Foreign Affairs in the Whig administration of Lord Melbourne, a post he held until 1840 (however, he was not a Member of Parliament during this time). The latter year he was appointed Envoy Extraordinary and Minister Plenipotentiary to the German Confederation, which he remained until 1849. In 1858 he succeeded his half-brother as fourth Earl of Ilchester and entered the House of Lords.

He was elected a Fellow of the Royal Society in March 1821.

== Geological work ==
Fox-Strangways was interested in geology and was elected as a Member of the Geological Society in 1815, serving on the Council 1820–1821. When he was attaché at the British Embassy in St Petersburg Fox-Strangways wrote 'Geological sketch of the environs of Petersburg' published in the Transactions of the Geological Society of London in 1821 (read on 16 April 1819), which includes a coloured geological map of the St Petersburg region, distinguishing four rock types, as well as some cross-sections and scenic views along the river banks. His work was expanded in a paper read to the Geological Society in 1821 published as 'An Outline of the Geology of Russia', which includes a 'Sketch to serve as a basis for a Geological Map of European Russia Coloured to show the connections of its the Strata with this of the Surrounding Countries'. The map is mineralogical, that is essentially charting lithological types, depicting 24 different types, labelled A to Z. These papers and maps are amongst the earliest published works on the geology of Russia and formed the basis of R. I. Murchison's 'Geology of Russia' (1845). His great nephew Charles Edward Fox-Strangways (1844–1910) was a geologist for the Geological Survey of Great Britain.

== Family ==
Lord Ilchester married Sophia Penelope Sheffield, daughter of Sir Robert Sheffield, 4th Baronet, in 1857. They had no children. He died in January 1865, aged 69, and was succeeded by his nephew Henry Edward Fox-Strangways. Between 1828 and 1834 Fox-Strangways donated 37 early Italian paintings to Christ Church. There they are still shown at the Christ Church Picture Gallery. "He also left a further 41 paintings to the Ashmolean, including Paolo Ucello's The Hunt.

== Arms ==
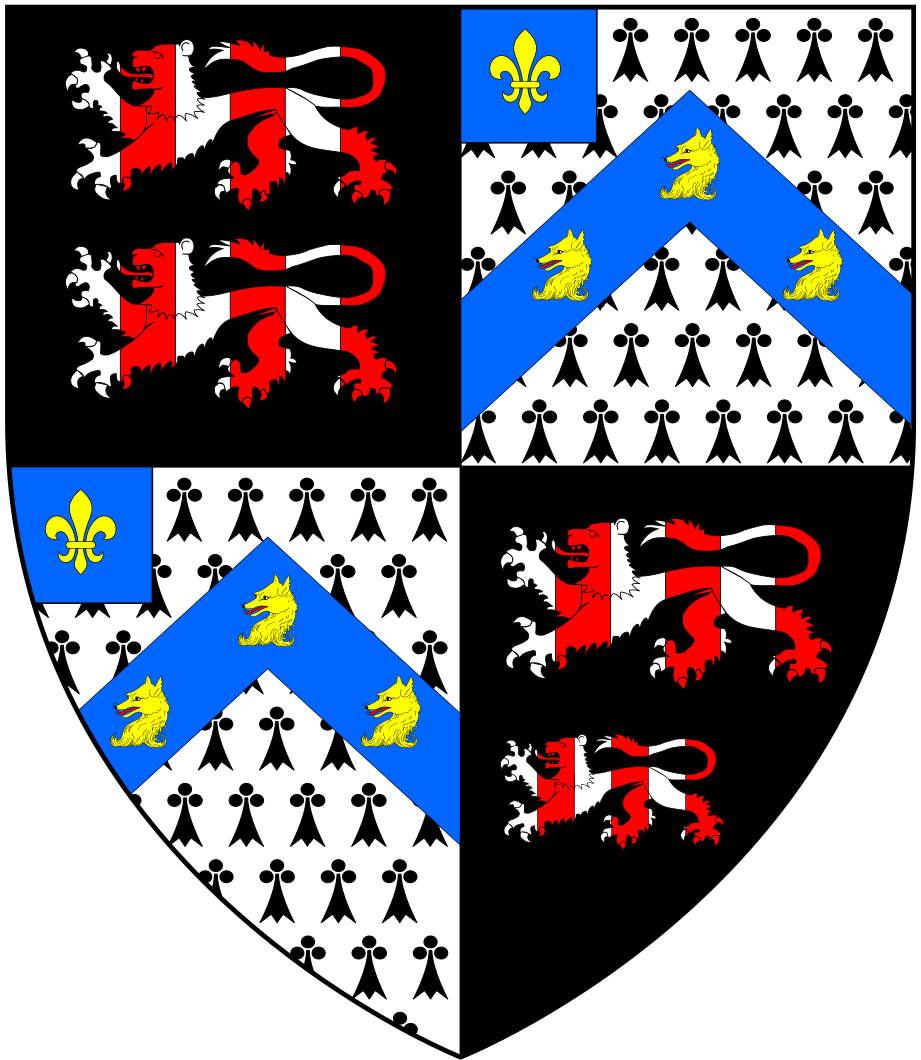
Arms of Fox-Strangways

The arms of the head of the Fox-Strangways family are blazoned Quarterly of four: 1st & 4th: Sable, two lions passant paly of six argent and gules (Strangways); 2nd & 3rd: Ermine, on a chevron azure three foxes' heads and necks erased or on a canton of the second a fleur-de-lys of the third (Fox).

== See also ==
- Ilchester Lectures

Political offices
Preceded by Viscount Mahon	Under-Secretary of State for Foreign Affairs; 1835–1840	Succeeded by Lord Leveson
Diplomatic posts
Preceded by Ralph Abercromby	Envoy Extraordinary and Minister Plenipotentiary to the German Confederation; 1840–1849	Succeeded by The Lord Cowley
Peerage of Great Britain
Preceded by Henry Stephen Fox-Strangways	Earl of Ilchester; 1858–1865	Succeeded by Henry Edward Fox-Strangways
