= Henry Fox-Strangways, 5th Earl of Ilchester =

British peer and Liberal politician

The Right Honourable The Earl of Ilchester PC
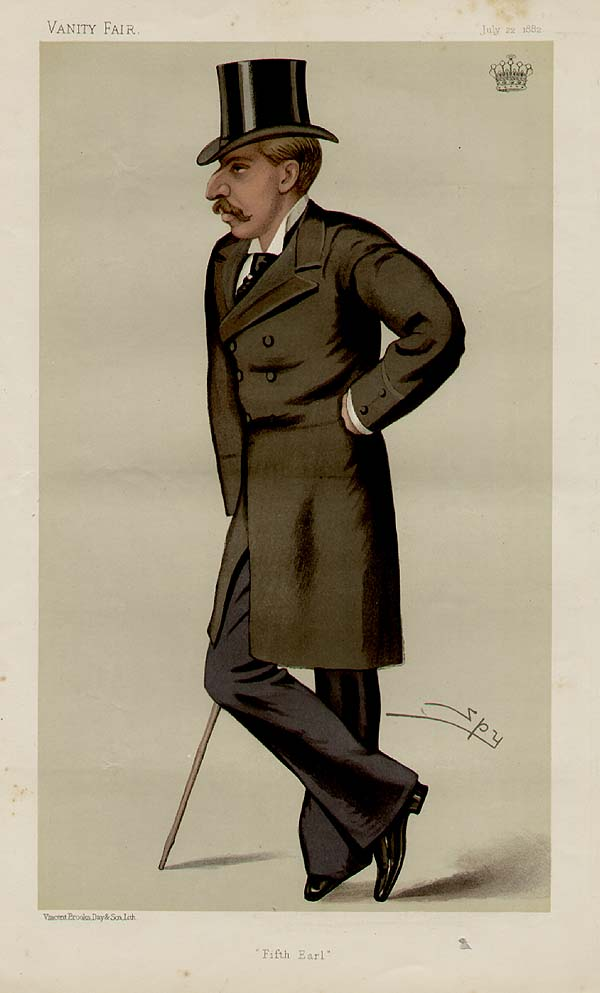
- "Fifth Earl": The Earl of Ilchester as caricatured by Spy (Leslie Ward) in Vanity Fair, July 1882.

Captain of the Gentlemen-at-Arms
- In office 1 January 1874 – 17 February 1874
- Monarch: Victoria
- Prime Minister: William Ewart Gladstone
- Preceded by: The Earl Cowper
- Succeeded by: The Marquess of Exeter
- Born: 13 February 1847
- Died: 6 December 1905 (aged 58)
- Education: Eton College
- Political party: Liberal
- Spouse: Mary Dawson (m. 1872)
- Children: 3
- Father: John Fox-Strangways

Henry Edward Fox-Strangways, 5th Earl of Ilchester PC (13 February 1847 – 6 December 1905), known as Henry Fox-Strangways until 1865, was a British peer and Liberal politician. He served as Captain of the Honourable Corps of Gentlemen-at-Arms under William Ewart Gladstone between January and February 1874.

== Early life and education ==
Lord Ilchester was the son of Hon John Fox-Strangways, fourth son of Henry Thomas Fox-Strangways, 2nd Earl of Ilchester. His mother was Amelia Marjoribanks, daughter of Edward Marjoribanks. He was educated at Eton College.

Lord Ilchester succeeded his uncle, William Fox-Strangways, 4th Earl of Ilchester, in the earldom of Ilchester in 1865 and was able to take his seat in the House of Lords on his 21st birthday in 1868.

In 1874 he acquired the Holland House estate in London from the estate of his distant cousin Henry Fox, 4th and last Baron Holland who died in 1859.

== Career ==
In January 1874, at the age of only 26, Ilchester was appointed Captain of the Honourable Corps of Gentlemen-at-Arms in the Liberal administration of William Ewart Gladstone, a post he held until the government fell the following month. He was admitted to the Privy Council in February of that year.

Lord Ilchester never held political office again but served as Lord Lieutenant of Dorset from 1885 to 1905.

== Marriage and children ==
In 1872 Lord Ilchester married Lady Mary Eleanor Anne Dawson (died 1935), a daughter of Richard Dawson, 1st Earl of Dartrey, with whom he had three children:

- Giles Stephen Holland Fox-Strangways, 6th Earl of Ilchester (31 May 1874 – 29 October 1959)
- Lady Muriel Augusta Fox-Strangways (23 November 1876 – 7 January 1920)
- Hon Denzil Vesey Fox-Strangways (26 February 1879 – 7 March 1901)

== Death and burial ==
He died in December 1905, aged 58, and was buried in the family vault at Melbury Osmond, Dorset. He was succeeded in his titles by his elder son Giles.

== Arms ==
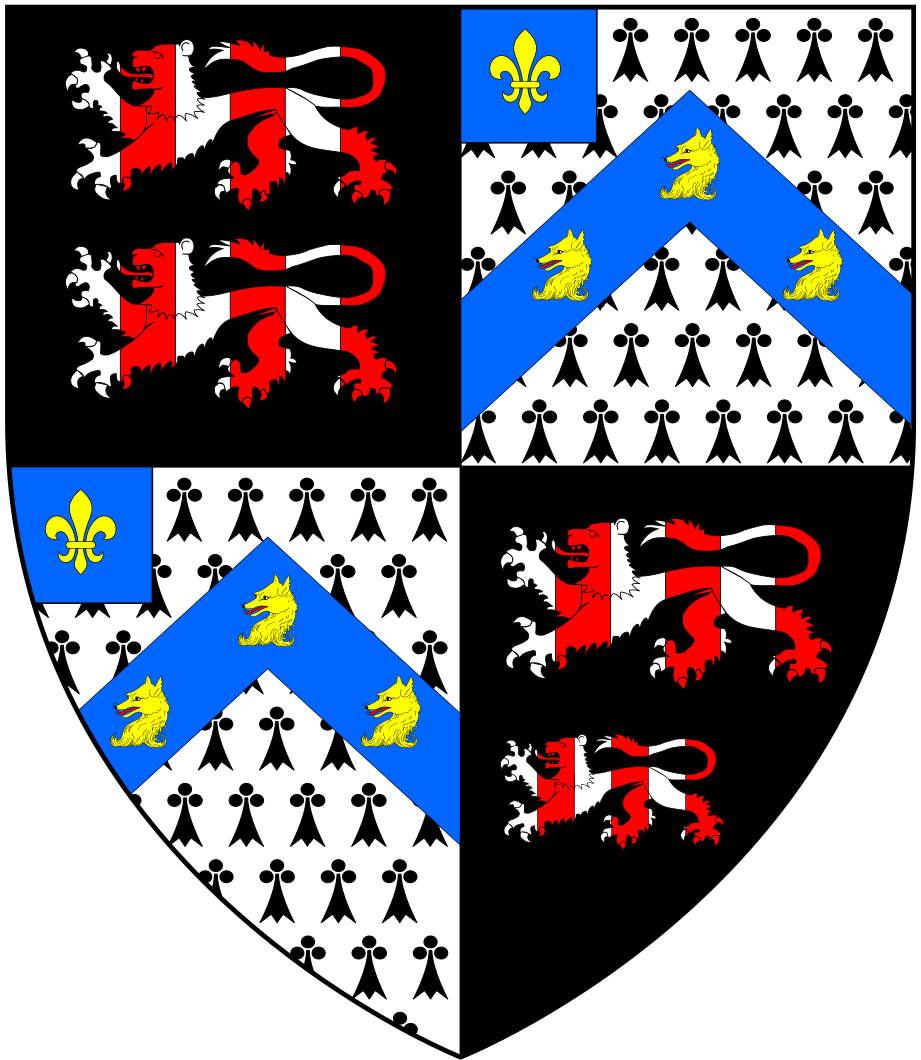
Arms of Fox-Strangways

The arms of the head of the Fox-Strangways family are blazoned Quarterly of four: 1st & 4th: Sable, two lions passant paly of six argent and gules (Strangways); 2nd & 3rd: Ermine, on a chevron azure three foxes' heads and necks erased or on a canton of the second a fleur-de-lys of the third (Fox).

Political offices
Preceded by The Earl Cowper	Captain of the Honourable Corps of Gentlemen-at-Arms; 1874	Succeeded by The Marquess of Exeter
Honorary titles
Preceded by The Earl of Shaftesbury	Lord Lieutenant of Dorset; 1885–1905	Succeeded by John Mount Batten
Peerage of Great Britain
Preceded by William Fox-Strangways	Earl of Ilchester; 1865–1905	Succeeded by Giles Fox-Strangways
