= 1780 Speaker of the British House of Commons election =

1780 election of the Speaker of the House of Commons

- 31 October 1780
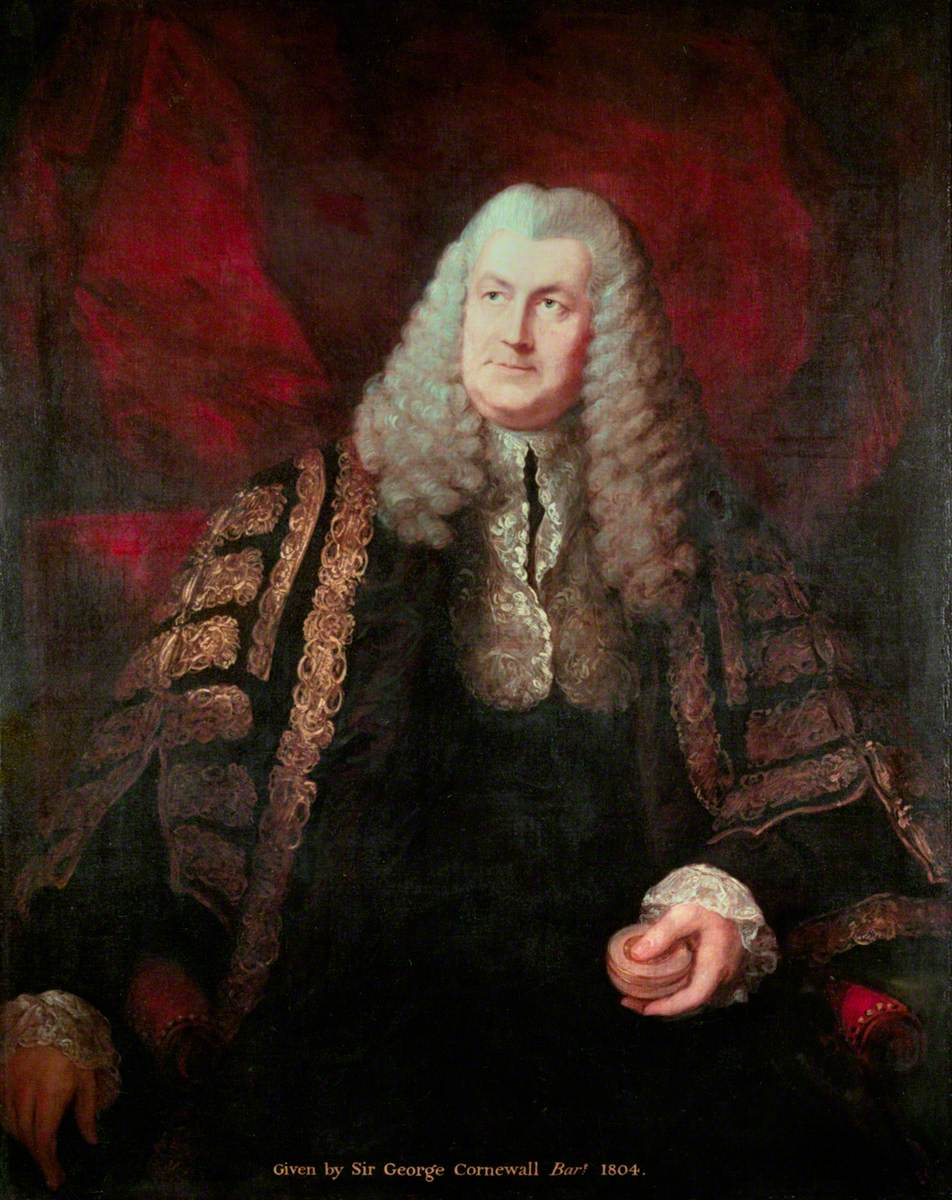

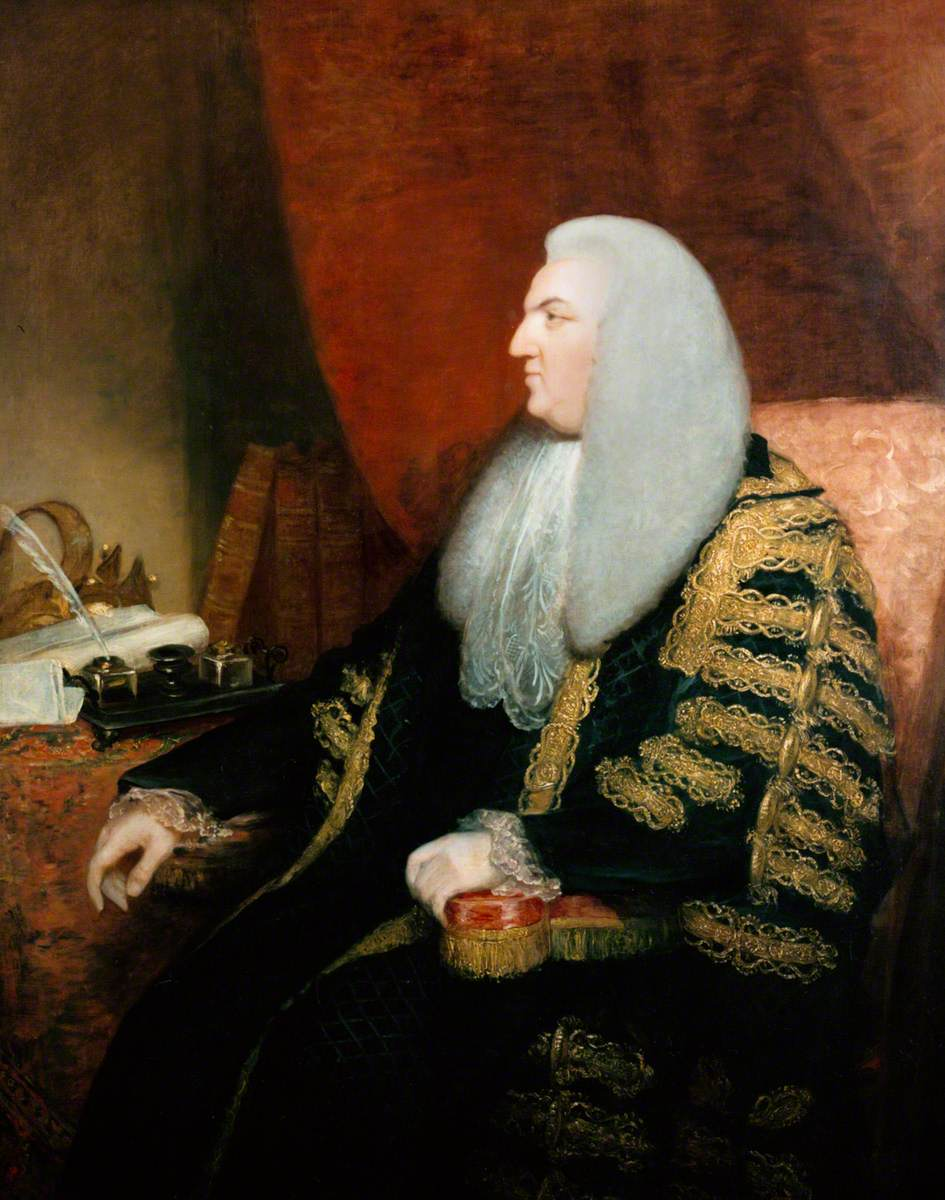
Candidate	Charles Wolfran Cornwall	Sir Fletcher Norton
Popular vote	203	134
Percentage	60.2%	39.8%
Candidate's seat	Winchelsea	Guildford
Speaker before election
Sir Fletcher Norton
Elected Speaker
Charles Wolfran Cornwall

The 1780 election of the Speaker of the House of Commons occurred on 31 October 1780.

Opening the debate, Lord George Germain complimented the "great honour, great diligence, and great dignity" of the incumbent Speaker Sir Fletcher Norton, but claimed that his health was too impaired to continue in office, and therefore proposed that Charles Wolfran Cornwall take the chair. Welbore Ellis seconded Cornwall. John Dunning proposed an amendment nominating Norton, and Thomas Townshend seconded.

Norton himself acknowledged his ill health, and stated that he intended to step down as Speaker, and wished to decline the nomination. However, he did not believe that his state of health was the true motive behind the government's wish for a new Speaker, and was surprised at his treatment. He called upon Germain and Ellis "to tell him why he was thus disgracefully dismissed". He stated that if anything could induce him to seek the Speakership, it was the contempt with which he was treated.

Charles James Fox, George Byng and Lord Mahon praised Norton and condemned the government's treatment of him.

Ellis reiterated the government line that they sought a Speaker in better health than Norton. Richard Rigby opposed Norton outright, stating that his statement in presenting the supply bill to King George III in May 1777 – that the supply was "great, beyond your Majesty’s highest expense" – was unwarranted and insulting to the King.

On the motion "That Charles Wolfran Cornwall, esq. do take the chair of this House as Speaker," Cornwall was elected by 203 votes to 134.
