= Henry Fox-Strangways, 2nd Earl of Ilchester =

British peer and Member of Parliament

The Right Honourable The Earl of Ilchester
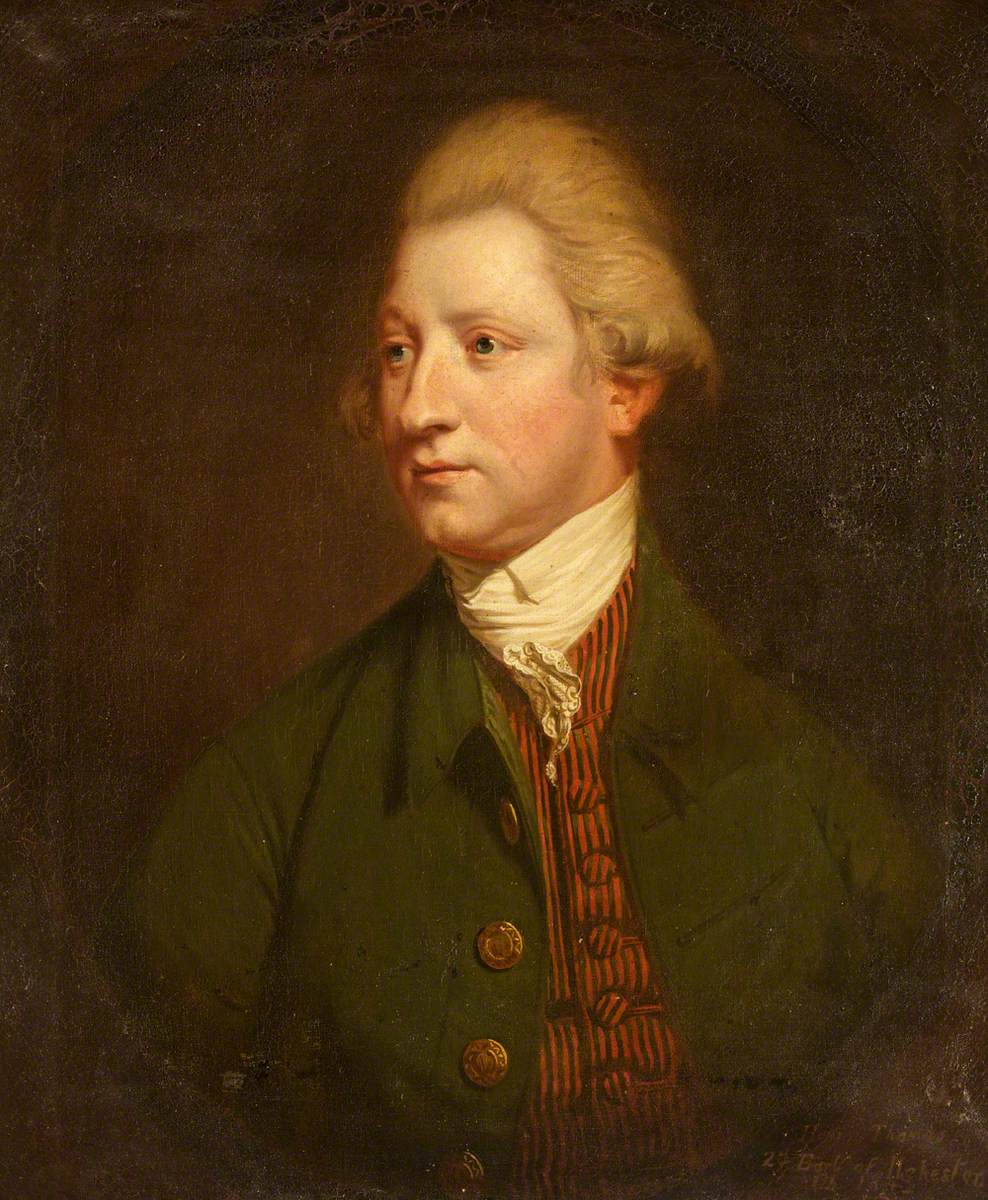

Member of the British Parliament for Midhurst
- In office 1768–1774

2nd Earl of Ilchester
- In office 1776–1802
- Succeeded by: Henry Fox-Strangways, 3rd Earl of Ilchester

Personal details
- Born: 10 August 1747
- Died: 5 September 1802
- Spouses: Mary Theresa O'Grady; Maria Digby
- Children: 11
- Parents: Stephen Fox-Strangways, 1st Earl of Ilchester (father); Elizabeth Horner (mother)

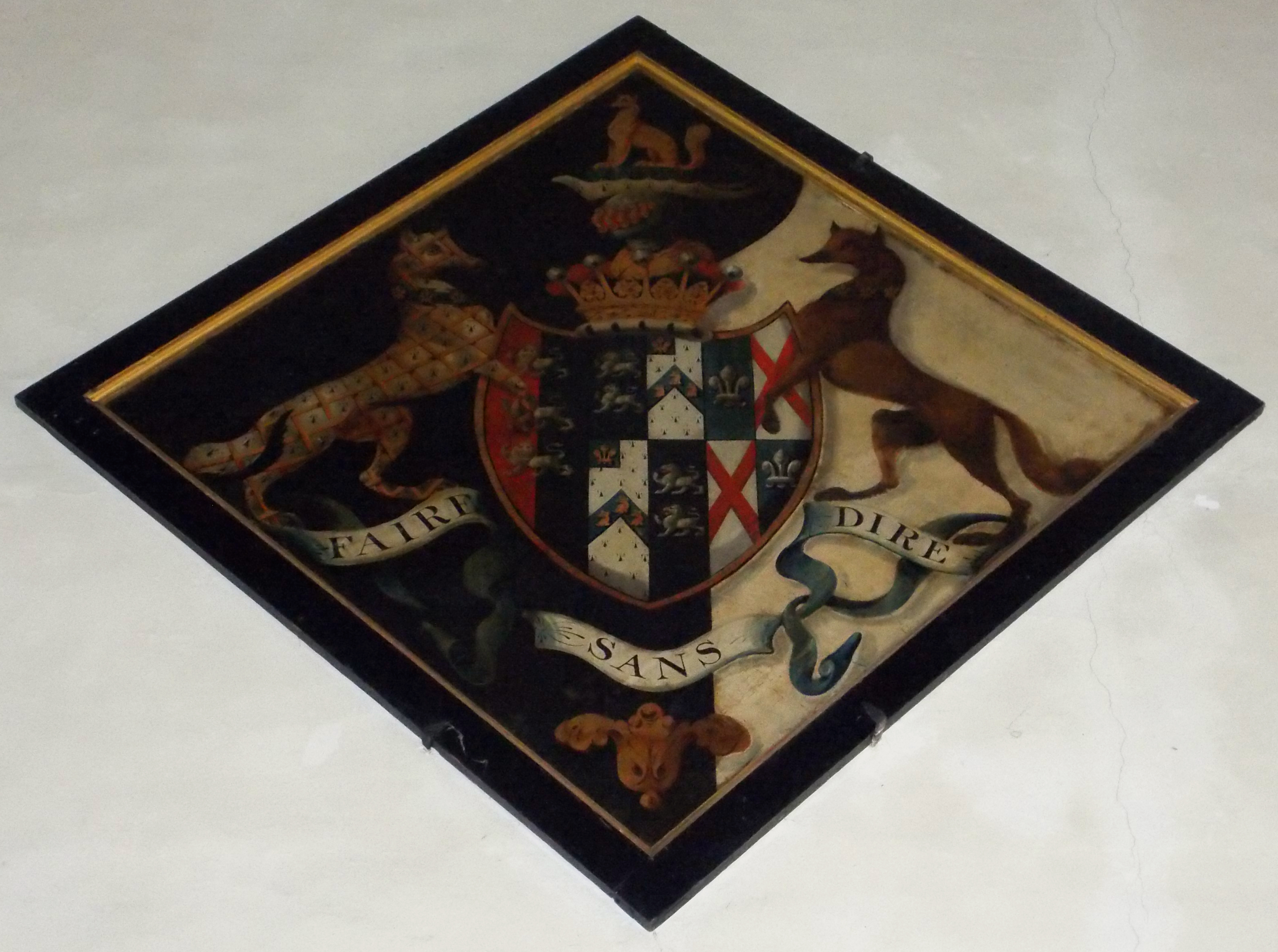
Funerary hatchment of Ilchester at Farley

Henry Thomas Fox-Strangways, 2nd Earl of Ilchester (10 August 1747 – 5 September 1802), known as Lord Stavordale from 1756 to 1776, was a British peer and Member of Parliament.

== Early life and education ==
Ilchester was the eldest son of Stephen Fox-Strangways, 1st Earl of Ilchester, and his wife, the former Elizabeth Horner. Henry Fox, 1st Baron Holland, was his uncle.

He was educated at Eton (1760–1764) and Christ Church, Oxford (1765).

== Career ==
He was elected to the House of Commons for Midhurst, Sussex in 1768 (along with his cousin Charles James Fox), a seat he retained until 1774. Two years later he succeeded his father as second Earl of Ilchester and took his seat in the House of Lords.

He bought an army commission in 1770 and was made a captain in the 24th Regiment of Foot, but in 1775 when the regiment was sent to America he resigned his commission.

Detailed information about the Ilchester household and family survives in the published diaries and correspondence of Agnes Porter, a Scottish-born governess to his many daughters from 1784 to 1797. The family's previous governess had been Jane Gardiner, a childhood friend of Mary Wollstonecraft.

== Marriages and children ==
Lord Ilchester married twice. His first marriage in 1772 was to Mary Theresa O'Grady (died 1792), a daughter of Standish O'Grady, by whom he had two sons and six daughters, including:

- Lady Mary Lucy Fox-Strangways (died 3 February 1855), married Captain Sir Christopher Cole KCB
- Lady Charlotte Anne Fox-Strangways (died 27 May 1826), married Sir Charles Lemon, 2nd Baronet
- Lady Elizabeth Theresa Fox-Strangways (died 12 March 1846), married William Davenport Talbot, of Lacock Abbey, near Chippenham, Wiltshire and were the parents of Henry Fox Talbot
- Lady Harriot Fox-Strangways (died 6 August 1844)
- Lady Louisa Emma Fox-Strangways (27 June 1785 – 3 April 1851), married Henry Petty-Fitzmaurice, 3rd Marquess of Lansdowne
- Henry Stephen Fox-Strangways, 3rd Earl of Ilchester (21 February 1787 – 3 January 1858)

Secondly, in 1794, he married Maria Digby, a daughter of The Very Reverend William Digby, Dean of Worcester, Dean of Durham, an Honorary Chaplain to the King, younger brother of Henry Digby, 1st Earl Digby and first cousin of Charles James Fox. With Maria Digby he had three sons:

- William Thomas Horner Fox-Strangways, 4th Earl of Ilchester (7 May 1795 – 10 January 1865)
- Hon Giles Digby Robert Fox-Strangways (26 May 1798 – 12 February 1827)
- Hon John George Charles Fox-Strangways (6 February 1803 – 8 September 1859), father of Henry Fox-Strangways, 5th Earl of Ilchester. A mural monument survives in the Ilchester Chapel of All Saints Church, Farley, Wiltshire.

== Death and succession ==
He died in September 1802, aged 55, and was succeeded by his son from his first marriage, Henry Fox-Strangways, 3rd Earl of Ilchester.

== Arms ==
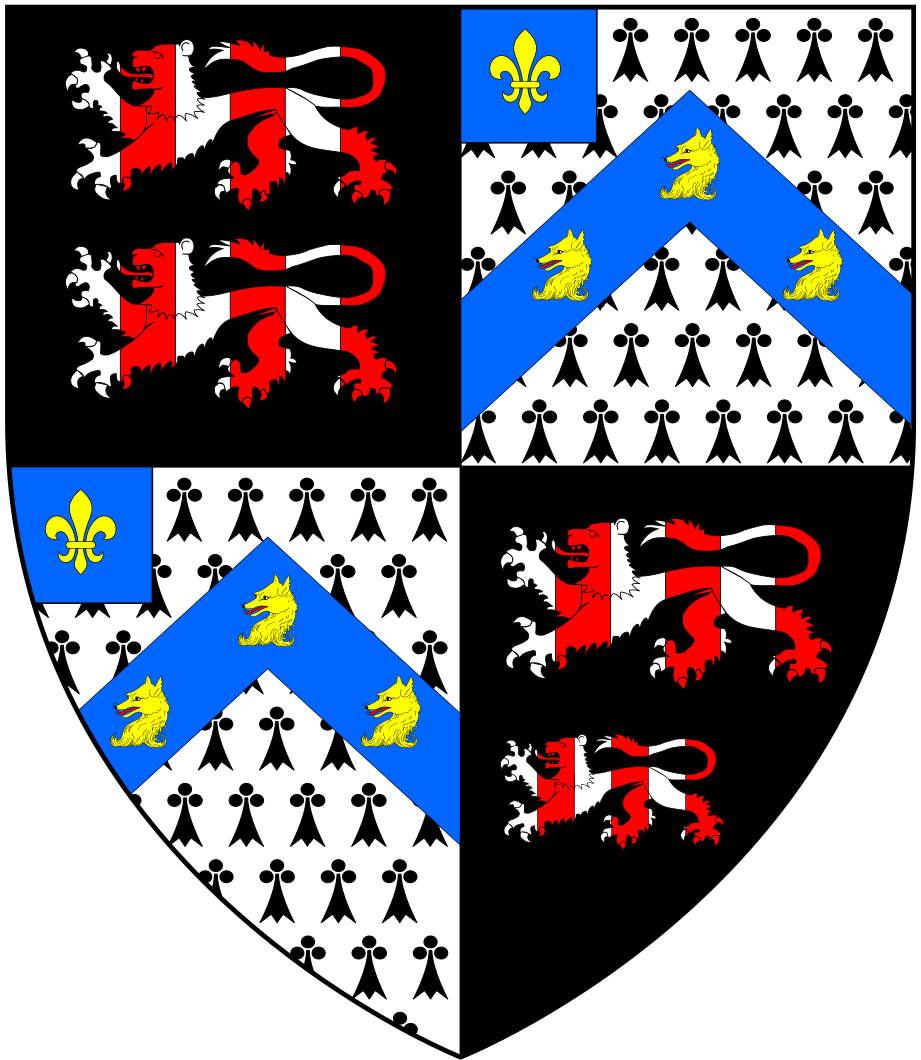
Arms of Fox-Strangways

The arms of the head of the Fox-Strangways family are blazoned Quarterly of four: 1st & 4th: Sable, two lions passant paly of six argent and gules (Strangways); 2nd & 3rd: Ermine, on a chevron azure three foxes' heads and necks erased or on a canton of the second a fleur-de-lys of the third (Fox).

A Funerary hatchment of Henry Fox-Strangways, 2nd Earl of Ilchester, in the Ilchester Chapel at Farley, shows his quartered arms impaling dexter O'Grady (Per pale gules and sable, three lions passant guardant in pale per pale argent and or) and sinister Digby (Azure, a fleur-de-lys argent) quartering FitzGerald.

Parliament of Great Britain
Preceded by John Burgoyne; Bamber Gascoyne	Member of Parliament for Midhurst; 1768–1774; With: Charles James Fox	Succeeded by Herbert Mackworth; Clement Tudway
Peerage of Great Britain
Preceded by Stephen Fox-Strangways	Earl of Ilchester; 1776–1802	Succeeded by Henry Fox-Strangways
