= Henry Fox-Strangways, 3rd Earl of Ilchester =

British peer and Whig politician

The Right Honourable The Earl of Ilchester PC
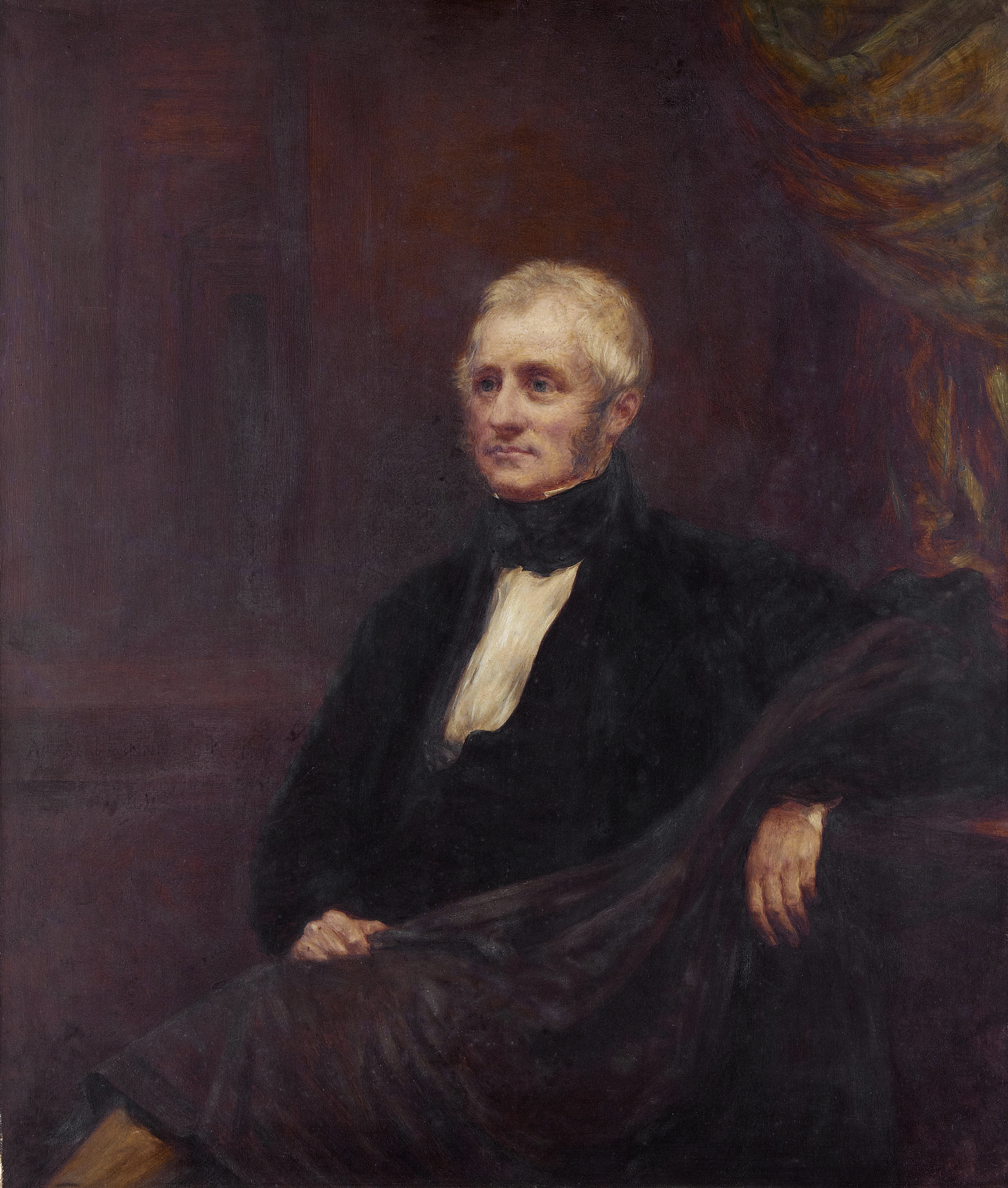
- Henry Stephen Fox-Strangways (John Linnell, 1848)

Captain of the Yeomen of the Guard
- In office 5 August 1835 – 6 July 1841
- Monarchs: William IV; Victoria
- Prime Minister: The Viscount Melbourne
- Preceded by: The Earl of Gosford
- Succeeded by: The Earl of Surrey

Personal details
- Born: 21 February 1787
- Died: 8 January 1858 (aged 70)
- Party: Whig
- Spouse: Caroline Leonora Murray (d. 1819)
- Children: 4
- Parent: Henry Fox-Strangways, 2nd Earl of Ilchester (father)
- Education: Christ Church, Oxford

Henry Stephen Fox-Strangways, 3rd Earl of Ilchester, PC (21 February 1787 – 8 January 1858), styled Lord Stavordale from birth until 1802, was a British peer and Whig politician. He served as Captain of the Yeomen of the Guard under Lord Melbourne from 1835 to 1841.

== Background and education ==
Stavordale was the eldest son of Henry Fox-Strangways, 2nd Earl of Ilchester, and Mary Theresa O'Grady, daughter of Standish O'Grady. He was educated at Christ Church, Oxford, which later (1814) awarded him a DCL.

== Political and Yeomanry career ==
Lord Ilchester succeeded his father as third Earl of Ilchester in 1802. On 15 April 1808, he was commissioned a captain in the Dorsetshire Yeomanry. The regiment was disbanded in 1814. He was commissioned major in it on 8 December 1830 when it was re-formed.

On 5 August 1835 he was appointed Captain of the Yeomen of the Guard in the Whig administration of Lord Melbourne. He was made a Privy Counsellor on 12 July 1837. Ilchester was replaced as Captain of the Yeomen of the Guard on 5 July 1841, shortly before the government's fall. He was also appointed Lord Lieutenant of Somerset on 19 April 1837, but the resigned from the post in May 1839.

On 6 June 1840, he was promoted from major to lieutenant-colonel in the Yeomanry. He was made lieutenant-colonel commandant of the Dorsetshire Yeomanry on 12 February 1846, resigning the command in July 1856.

== Family ==
Lord Ilchester married Caroline Leonora Murray, daughter of Lord George Murray, in 1812. They had four children:

- Henry Thomas Leopold Fox-Strangways, Lord Stavordale (7 January 1816 – 11 August 1837), captain in the Dorsetshire Yeomanry 1837
- Lady Theresa Anna Maria Fox-Strangways (11 January 1814 – 2 May 1874), married Edward Digby, 9th Baron Digby on 27 June 1837.
- Stephen Fox-Strangways, Lord Stavordale (21 March 1817 – 25 May 1848), cornet in the Dorsetshire Yeomanry 1838, later captain
- Lady Caroline Margaret Fox-Strangways (9 January 1819 – 26 June 1895), married Sir Edward Kerrison, 2nd Baronet on 23 July 1844.

Lady Ilchester died giving birth to her fourth child. Lord Ilchester died at Melbury House on 8 January 1858, aged 70. Both his sons had predeceased him and he was succeeded in his titles by his half-brother, William Fox-Strangways.

== Arms ==
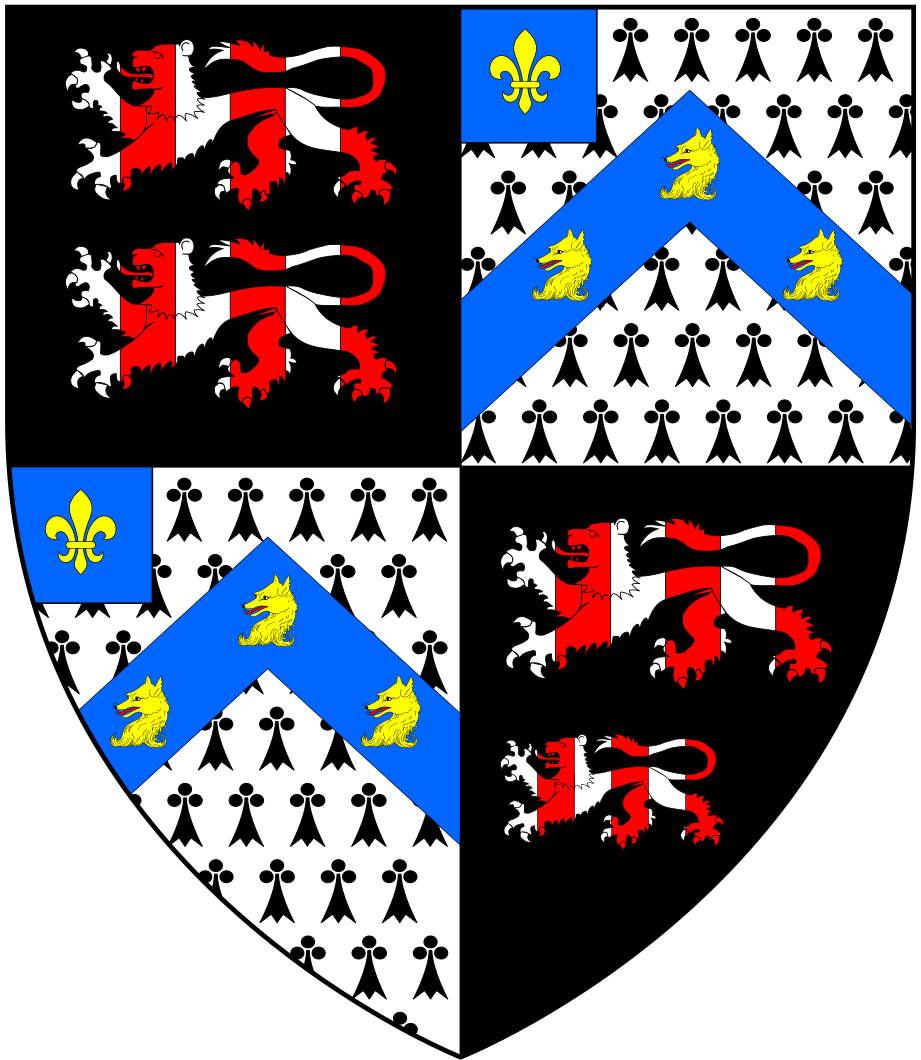
Arms of Fox-Strangways

The arms of the head of the Fox-Strangways family are blazoned Quarterly of four: 1st & 4th: Sable, two lions passant paly of six argent and gules (Strangways); 2nd & 3rd: Ermine, on a chevron azure three foxes' heads and necks erased or on a canton of the second a fleur-de-lys of the third (Fox).

Political offices
Preceded by The Earl of Gosford	Captain of the Yeomen of the Guard; 1835–1841	Succeeded by The Earl of Surrey
Military offices
Preceded by James Frampton	Lieutenant-Colonel Commandant of the Dorsetshire Yeomanry (Queen's Own); 1846–1856	Succeeded by The Lord Rivers
Honorary titles
Preceded by The Marquess of Bath	Lord-Lieutenant of Somerset; 1837–1839	Succeeded by The Viscount Portman
Peerage of Great Britain
Preceded by Henry Thomas Fox-Strangways	Earl of Ilchester; 1802–1858	Succeeded by William Thomas Horner Fox-Strangways
