= Anthony Robinson =

Anthony Robinson may refer to:

- Tony Robinson (business adviser) (Anthony Charles Robinson, born 1952), British entrepreneur and micro-enterprise campaigner
- Anthony John Robinson (1925–1982), British field hockey player
- Anthony Robinson (novelist) (1931–2026), American novelist and short story writer
- Anthony Robinson (MP) (c. 1582–1641), English politician
- Anthony Robinson (Unitarian) (1762–1827), English Unitarian minister
- Tubby T, real name Anthony Robinson (1974–2008), British dancehall/garage musician
- Anthony Robinson, swimmer from the United States, who briefly in 2001 held the world record in the long course 50 breaststroke
- Anthony Robinson, contestant from Survivor: Fiji (2007)
- Anthony Robinson (serial killer) (born 1986), American serial killer
- Anthony Robinson II (born 2005), American college basketball player

== See also ==
- Tony Robinson (disambiguation)
- Antonee Robinson, soccer player
