= A History of the Early Part of the Reign of James II =

1808 unfinished book

A History of the Early Part of the Reign of James II (1808) is a history of England during the first year of James II's reign (1685), written by the Whig MP Charles James Fox. It was left unfinished at his death in 1806 and was not published until 1808.

== Background ==
Ever since the Glorious Revolution of 1688, the Whigs had appealed to that event as a great deliverance from the attempt by James II to set up an absolute monarchy. Fox (who was James' great-great-great nephew) was a staunch Whig and believed that his conflict with George III was similar to that between the Whigs of the late seventeenth century and James II. In August 1802, during the Peace of Amiens, Fox travelled to Paris to search the archives for his history. Talleyrand brought Fox into contact with the appropriate librarian and Fox would spend each day at the library.

Part of Fox's motive in writing it was to correct the Tory interpretation of David Hume's History of England, who Fox considered to be "an excellent man and of great powers of mind, but his Partiality to Kings and Princes is intolerable". Fox was able to glean information from what his grandfather the Duke of Richmond had heard from the Duchess of Portsmouth and he consulted fellow historians William Belsham, Sir John Dalrymple, Andrew Stuart, Charles Butler. Through his aristocratic connections, Fox was also able to access the papers of some of the British nobility and through his French connections he was able to enlist the help of Talleyrand and Lafayette to access French archives.

== Contents ==
Fox originally wanted to carry the history down past James II's reign into that of William III but he died before he could complete it, and it was posthumously published in 1808. Fox's view is that of Whig history; that is, the history of England is an ongoing struggle between the absolutist designs of monarchs and the struggle of their subjects to assert their liberty.

== Reception ==
One of Fox's biographers claimed that the book "was cordially received by friends, criticized by others, ignored by professionals".

The Whig peer Lord Holland, who was Fox's nephew and who ensured its publication, considered it "an imperfect work but one which will if possible add to his reputation & I sometimes flatter myself infuse into posterity some little portion of that spirit of liberty which he & he alone preserved in this country for years". Reviewing the book in the Edinburgh Review, Francis Jeffrey praised it as "the only appeal to the old principles of English constitutional freedom, and the only expression of those firm and temperate sentiments of independence, which are the peculiar produce, and natural protection of our mixed government, which we recollect to ave met with for very many years". According to Lord John Russell the book was "a work which contains more sound constitutional opinions than any other history which I am acquainted".

The later Whig historian, Thomas Macaulay, wrote to his sister in 1833 that "We see in our time that the books written by public men of note are generally rated at more than their real value" and gave as an example Fox's history. In reviewing Sir James Mackintosh's history of the Glorious Revolution in 1835, Macaulay claimed that "the superiority of Mr. Fox to Sir James as an orator is hardly more clear than the superiority of Sir James to Mr. Fox as a historian. Mr. Fox with a pen in his hand, and Sir James on his legs in the House of Commons were, we think, each out of his proper element". He added that Fox's work "will always keep its place in our libraries as a valuable book" but that his obsessive desire not to use colloquial English was unworthy of so great a man. Macaulay also claimed that Fox's nature as an orator also hindered his ability as an historian:

There is about the whole book a vehement, contentious, replying manner. Almost every argument is put in the form of an interrogation, an ejaculation, or a sarcasm. The writer seems to be addressing himself to some imaginary audience, to be tearing in pieces a defence of the Stuarts which has just been pronounced by an imaginary Tory. Take, for example, his answer to Hume's remarks on the execution of Sydney; and substitute “the honourable gentleman” or “the noble Lord” for the name of Hume. The whole passage sounds like a powerful reply, thundered at three in the morning from the Opposition Bench. While we read it, we can almost fancy that we see and hear the great English debater, such as he has been described to us by the few who can still remember the Westminster scrutiny and the Oczakow Negotiations, in the full paroxysm of inspiration, foaming, screaming, choked by the rushing multitude of his words.

Charles Harding Firth considered the work to have "little historical value".
