= Tony Robinson (disambiguation) =

Tony Robinson is a TV presenter and actor.

Tony Robinson may also refer to:

- Tony Robinson (American football) (born 1964), former American football quarterback
- Tony Robinson (bishop) (born 1956), Bishop of Wakefield
- Tony Robinson (politician) (born 1962), Australian politician
- Tony Robinson (shooting victim) (born c. 1996), killed by police in Madison, Wisconsin in 2015
- Tony Robinson (speech recognition), British pioneer of recurrent neural networks
- Tony Robinson (business adviser) (born 1952), British business speaker, author and micro-enterprise campaigner

== See also ==
- Anthony Robinson (disambiguation)
