= Anthony Robinson (Unitarian) =

English Unitarian minister (1762-1827)

Anthony Robinson (1762–1827) was an English Unitarian minister and friend of Charles James Fox.

== Life ==
Robinson was born in January 1762 at Kirkland near Wigton in Cumberland. He was educated at Bristol Baptist Academy, under James Newton (1733-1790). Robinson was baptized at The Pithay Meeting, Bristol, in 1784. He became a minister, at the General Baptist Church, Glasshouse Yard, Worship Street, London. About 1790, having succeeded to his father's estate, he retired to Wigan. About 1796, he returned to London, where he became a successful sugar refiner.

Robinson had an influential circle of acquaintance, including Joseph Priestley, William Belsham, and Henry Crabb Robinson.

He died in Hatton Garden, 20 January 1827, and was buried in the Worship Street Baptist churchyard.

== Family ==
Robinson's son Anthony, who disappeared in 1824, is alleged one of the victims of Burke and Hare.

== Publications ==
- A Short History of the Persecution of Christians by Jews, Heathens, and Christians (Carlisle, 1793)
- A View of the Causes and Consequences of English Wars (London, 1798)
- An Examination of a Sermon preached at Cambridge by Robert Hall on Modern Infidelity (London, 1800)
