= William Belsham =

English political writer and historian (1752–1827)

William Belsham (1752 – 17 November 1827) was an English political writer and historian, noted as a supporter of the Whig Party and its principles. He justified the American Revolution in excusing Americans in their resistance to the demands of England, and he was an advocate of progressive political liberty.

== Life ==
The brother of the Unitarian preacher Thomas Belsham, and brother-in-law of the Unitarian minister Timothy Kenrick, he was born at Bedford, the son of James Belsham (died 1770), a nonconformist minister. He died near Hammersmith on 17 November 1827.

== Work ==
Belsham wrote history as a radical Whig. He belonged to the anti-war group of historians, with Charles James Fox and Anthony Robinson. He began his career as an author by publishing Essays, Philosophical, Historical, and Literary, two vols. 1789–91. He used the term "libertarian" in a discussion of free will and in opposition to "necessitarian" (or determinist) views.

In 1792 he published Examination of an Appeal from the Old to the New Whigs, and in 1793 Remarks on the Nature and Necessity of Political Reform. He also wrote on the Test Act, the French Revolution, the Treaty of Amiens, and the poor laws.

In 1793 Belsham published, in two volumes, Memoirs of the Kings of Great Britain of the House of Brunswick-Luneburg, and this was followed in 1795 by Memoirs of the Reign of George III to the Session of Parliament 1793, in four volumes, a fifth and sixth volume appearing in 1801, bringing it down to 1799. In 1798 he published, in two volumes, A History of Great Britain from the Revolution to the Accession of the House of Hanover, and in 1806 all the volumes were reissued, with two additional volumes, the twelve volumes appearing under the title, History of Great Britain to the Conclusion of the Peace of Amiens in 1802. He engaged in controversy with Bishop Herbert Marsh on the responsibility for the French Revolutionary Wars, taking the Foxite Whig line and supporting German critics of Great Britain.

An eight-volume set Memoirs of the Reign of George III from his Accession, to the Peace of Amiens was published in 1813.
