= Elizabeth Harriet Grieve =

British swindler (b. c. 1723, d. in or after 1782)

Elizabeth Grieve
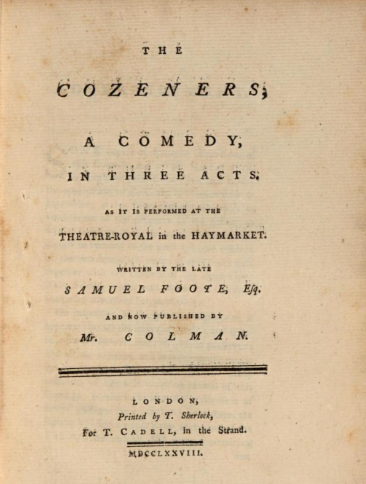
- A satirical play based on her crimes
- Born: Elizabeth Harriet Grieve c.1723
- Died: 1782 or after
- Known for: swindling

Elizabeth Harriet Grieve (c. 1723 – 1782 or after) was a British swindler. She was offering to intercede to gain preferments for her customers. She charged them with the costs of the (illegal) bribes. Her most public swindle was to offer to arrange a marriage between the Honorable Charles James Fox and a West Indian heiress. The heiress never existed. The court case led to verses and a play at the Haymarket, The Cozeners in 1774 where one of the leading character was named Miss Fleece'um.

== Life ==
Later references suggest that Grieve was born in about 1723. As it said that was about fifty when she appeared in court in 1773. Grieve had been advertising her advice for half a guinea in Soho. There were rumours that she was related to Lord North, the duke of Grafton and a friend of the earl of Guilford. What was not a rumour was that she was offering advice to the Honorable Charles James Fox who was a leading politician and a gambler known as the "Right Honourable spendthrift". Grieve had cleverly lent him £300 which kept him as a customer to impress others. Fox was promised that Grieve could arrange a marriage for him to a West Indian heiress named Miss Phipps. Fox was so taken in that he started to powder his eyebrows in order that he might appeal to Phipps who was said to be fussy about skin colour. Grieve was eventually sent to trial.

Grieve was sentenced to be transported for seven years on 27 October 1774 at Middlesex quarter sessions, Hicks Hall. During the trial she created laughter with a letter she had that was written to her by the Honorable Charles James Fox.

The resulting scandal resulted in news stories, rhymes and a play at the Theatre Royal, Haymarket. One play, The Cozeners, by Samuel Foote was based on Fox and Grieve. In 1774 The Cozeners opened with Mrs Gardner in the part of Mrs Fleece'em. George III, observing Fox's licentious private behaviour, took it to be presumption and judged that Fox could not be trusted to take anything seriously.
