= Anthony Robinson (serial killer) =

Serial killer known as the Shopping Cart Killer (born 1986)

- Born: September 3, 1986 (age 40)
- Other name: Shopping Cart Killer
- Years active: 2021 (possibly 2018)
- Children: 2 (1 deceased)
- Conviction: First degree murder (2 counts) Concealing dead bodies (2 counts) Aggravated murder (2 counts)

Details
- Victims: 2 convicted, 6 total suspected
- States: Virginia, Washington D.C.
- Date apprehended: November 23, 2021
- Imprisoned at: Wallens Ridge State Prison

Anthony Eugene Robinson (born September 3, 1986) is an American serial killer who murdered at least four women in the Washington, D.C. area and transported their bodies using shopping carts, thus dubbing him the Shopping Cart Killer. On May 22, 2026, he was sentenced to life in prison for the murders of Beth Redmon and Tonita Smith.

== Background ==
Prior to his arrest, Robinson worked in waste management and had a "remarkable absence of criminal history". He was homeless and lived in multiple areas including New York City, Maryland, and Virginia.

== Victims ==
=== Allene Elizabeth Redmon ===
Redmon, 54, went missing on October 24, 2021. She had told her family she was going to a football game with a friend by the name of Ant (Anthony), whom her daughter, Amanda May, had never heard of before. Her remains were found with her hands bound in an undeveloped lot in Harrisonburg, Virginia near the Howard Johnson Motel. The cause of death is disputed. One source stated blunt force trauma, while others suspected asphyxiation due to a cord being tied around Redmon's neck.

=== Tonita Smith ===
Smith, 39, went missing November 19, 2021. The last location extracted from her phone data was deemed to be at the Howard Johnson Hotel in Harrisonburg. Her body was found 15 feet away from Redmon on November 25, although it was confirmed that the two women had been murdered on separate occasions. Her cause of death, like Redmon's, is disputed.

=== Cheyenne Brown ===
Brown, 29, was reported missing September 30, 2021, last seen entering a Metrobus. She had a 7-year-old son and was pregnant at the time of her disappearance. Her family went on live television to spread awareness. Brown's cousin Jonathan Willis confirmed seeing Robinson with Brown in her house ten days before she went missing, at which time Willis forced him to leave the house. Robinson came back a day later and was kicked out once more. Like Redmon and Smith, Brown's remains were found near a hotel, the Moon Inn Hotel, some 130 miles from Howard Johnson Motel. Her body was placed with another victim, Stephanie Harrison, in a container next to a shopping cart. Both women's bodies were so decomposed that they could only recognize Brown by a tattoo. Police found data that she had been communicating with Robinson on a dating app days before she was murdered. Video footage showed that she and Robinson were at the same metro station, and that she was staying at the Moon Inn Hotel at the same time as Robinson. Her cause of death is unknown.

=== Stephanie Harrison ===
Stephanie Harrison, 48, had been visiting D.C from Redding, California. She was staying at the Moon Inn Hotel concurrently but unconnected to Robinson. It is suspected that they met spontaneously while staying at the hotel. Her remains were found in a container with Cheyenne Brown on December 15, after Robinson's arrest. Her body was in so late a stage of decomposition that police could not identify her for multiple weeks. Her cause of death is unknown.

== Suspected victims ==
=== Sonya Champ ===
Sonya Champ, 40, was a resident of D.C. whose body was found in mid-September 2021, before any of the confirmed murders. Her corpse was placed in a shopping cart and covered by a blanket. At the time of her discovery, her death was not linked to a serial killer as Robinson's other victims had not gone missing yet, although it was still ruled a homicide.

In September 2024, three years after her death, Robinson's DNA was found on Champ's body. The likelihood of the DNA belonging to another person was 1 in 22 nonillion (the number “one” followed by 30 zeros).

=== Skye Allen ===
Skye Allen was the ex-fiancée of Robinson. She died in 2018 at the age of 30 due to cardiac arrhythmia. Allen's mother had gone into her room, believing her to be awake, and found her barely breathing. After her death, Allen's mother confronted Robinson, who was disliked among many of Allen's family members, and asked him if he had killed her daughter. He denied any part in her death, but Allen's mother stated she still believes that Robinson had something to do with it. Similarly to his victims, Robinson met Allen on a dating site.

== Attempted victims ==
=== Monica White ===
Monica White claimed to have met Robinson on a dating app one year before he was arrested. At age 53, she had recently gone through a divorce and signed up for dating apps in the fall of 2020. She alleged that Robinson started the conversation with "Hi beautiful, I'd like to get to know you better." He also told her that he had once been a preschool teacher. As the relationship progressed, Robinson stated he preferred older women, which most of his victims were. He told White he had a son who had died as an infant, and a school-aged daughter.

In early 2021, Robinson visited White in her hometown of Mechanicsburg, Pennsylvania. As she greeted him at the bus station, he asked her not to judge him immediately, stating, "I don't like when women reject me". He allegedly tried to move in with her as soon as the two met in person, but White turned the suggestion down.

A month after his first visit, Robinson visited again, booking a one-way ticket, informing White he planned to stay in Pennsylvania. During his stay there, however, White and Robinson ended things on bad terms. She gave him $20 to buy a ticket and return home, but he did not. Weeks later, still in the state, he asked White to come to a hotel with him in Harrisburg, Pennsylvania, offering her $500. She declined and the two never spoke again.

== Capture and incarceration ==
Police were given access to all visitors at the Howard Johnson Hotel as well as security camera footage. One such video showed Redmon arriving at Robinson's room at around 6 p.m. on the day she was murdered. At 4 a.m. the next morning, it showed Robinson removing the corpse, which was wrapped in the hotel's bedsheets and comforters, from a shopping cart and throwing away Redmon's tennis shoes. Footage of similar occurrences with Smith were also found, with blood found on the bedsheets of her and Robinson's shared hotel room.

After accessing Robinson's phone, police found that following each murder, he had watched explicit videos that matched his victim's looks and physique.

After finding the video evidence, Robinson was arrested November 23, 2021. When being questioned, he first stated to have never met either women. Upon being shown security footage, Robinson changed his story, claiming that in the hotel room, he witnessed both Redmon and Smith swallow a “white pill” and, after falling asleep, awoke to find they had died of overdoses. He then alleged to have only disposed of them in fear he would be suspected of murder at the discovery of their bodies. Although traces of drugs were found in the victims postmortem, it was not enough to be lethal.

Robinson was represented by attorney Louis Nagy, who asserted his client had "a history of mental illness since 2014". Despite pleading not guilty, he was charged in September 2022 with two counts of first-degree murder, two counts of concealing dead bodies, and one count of aggravated murder. He was charged once more two months later with another count of aggravated murder of multiple people. During the court hearing, Robinson did not speak and held a "stern look on his face".

In January 2025, Robinson went to trial for the murders of Beth Redmon and Tonita Smith. Nagy argued that it was impossible to know what happened in the hotel rooms the day of the victims’ death, and further argued that the video footage, although suspicious, was not enough to confirm anything.

The jury took only 30 minutes to conclude he was guilty, recommending the maximum possible sentences for each crime. After being pushed back multiple times, Robinson was set to be sentenced in May 2026. On May 22, 2026, Robinson was sentenced to life in prison for the murders of Redmon and Smith.
