= Tony Robinson (business adviser) =

British entrepreneur

Anthony Charles Robinson OBE
- Born: 7 September 1952 (age 73); Yorkshire, England
- Occupation: Entrepreneur
- Writing career
- Language: English
- Website: www.tonyrobinsonobe.com

Anthony Charles Robinson OBE (born 7 September 1952) is a business speaker, author and micro-enterprise campaigner.

== Early life ==
Anthony Charles Robinson was born in 1952 in North Ferriby, East Riding of Yorkshire and attended Beverley Grammar School in Beverley, East Riding of Yorkshire, from 1964 to 1971.

== Career ==
Robinson founded Business Advisory Bureau (BAB) Limited, a company which specialises in helping large organisations in both private and public sectors engage with and supply SMEs, in January 1986. In 1998 Robinson co-founded the Small Firms Enterprise Development Initiative (SFEDI) Group, which despite being independent is the government recognised UK Standards Setting Body for Business Support and Business Enterprise. The Group received £1.2 million of government funding in 2011 to help boost its Get Mentoring scheme. Since founding the Small Firms Enterprise Development Initiative (SFEDI), Robinson has campaigned to make life better for small and business owners in the UK.

Robinson's campaigning led him to co-found and develop the Institute of Enterprise and Entrepreneurship (IOEE), an educational institute dedicated to recognising individuals who choose enterprise and entrepreneurship as a professional career. Robinson then co-founded #MicroBizMattersDay, an annual day of Recognition, Action and Learning for micro business owners, in 2001. Robinson and co-founder Tina Boden held the first #Microbizmatters on 8 January 2015, and continue the annual day on the 2nd Friday of each New Year.

Since September 2004, Robinson has served as a non-executive director for Yorkshire Coast Enterprise (YCE) Limited – a non-profit organisation promoting enterprise in Scarborough, North Yorkshire and currently serves as chair of the organisation. Ahead of the 2015 UK general election, 'Real Business' featured Robinson as part of a five British entrepreneur and executive line-up focusing on the government's support of small companies and the improvements a new government could make. Robinson was also a Judge at the Great British Entrepreneurs Awards in 2018 and 2019 as well as in the simply Business £10,000 Business Boost Award 2020.

=== Author ===
Robinson, alongside Leonora Soculitherz, wrote and published Freedom from Bosses Forever: how to take control of your own destiny by going it alone, a satirical book in July 2014. According to WorldCat, the book is held in three libraries.

Robinson wrote The Happipreneur, which was published in August 2020 by FCM publishing, to help entrepreneurs control their own destiny through their own enterprise in order to make ends meet and live a happy and fulfilled life rather than use wealth creation as the prime motive.

== Awards and honours ==
In 2001, Robinson was awarded an OBE in the Queen's New Year Honours List in recognition of his service to small firms and training.

Year	Award	Category	Result
2012	International Association of Book-keepers Awards	Lifetime Contribution to Enterprise	Won
2016	Smith and Williamson Awards	Top 100 Power UK Entrepreneurship Influencers	Won
2019	National Enterprise Network Awards	Enterprise Support Champion of the Year	Won

== Charity work and philanthropy ==
Since campaigning in 1998 to make life better for small and business owners in the UK. Robinson has also campaigned and raised funds for #PayIn30Days, an initiative designed to tackle late payment – one of the biggest issues facing the area's small and medium enterprises, and #ExcludedUK, a campaign to support 3 million business owners and self-employed individuals who have been excluded from UK Government COVID-19 income support since the global pandemic.

Robinson also serves as Patron for the John Cracknell Youth Enterprise Bank, a charity which helps disadvantaged young people with the potential to become entrepreneurs with funding and access to mentors and has run three marathons in aid of Macmillan Cancer Support.

== Bibliography ==
- The Happipreneur Why #MicroBizMatters? (2020, Chronos Publishing, ISBN 978-1916362147)
- A Perfect Little Gift (2019, Chronos Publishing, ISBN 978-0995594302)
- Loose Cannon (2017. Tony Robinson OBE, ISBN 978-1787231849)
- @MicroBizMatters Start Up Guide (2016, CreateSpace, ISBN 978-1535180511)
- Soculitherz on TV – 20 Feisty Enterprise Tips (2015, Tony Robinson OBE, ISBN 978-1849148818)
- Freedom From Bosses Forever (2014 Tony Robinson OBE, ISBN 978-1849144933)
- The Essential Guide to Earning a Living from Independent Consultancy (1996, BAB Publications, ISBN 978-0951248812)
