= Charles James Fox =

British statesman (1749–1806)

The Right Honourable Charles James Fox
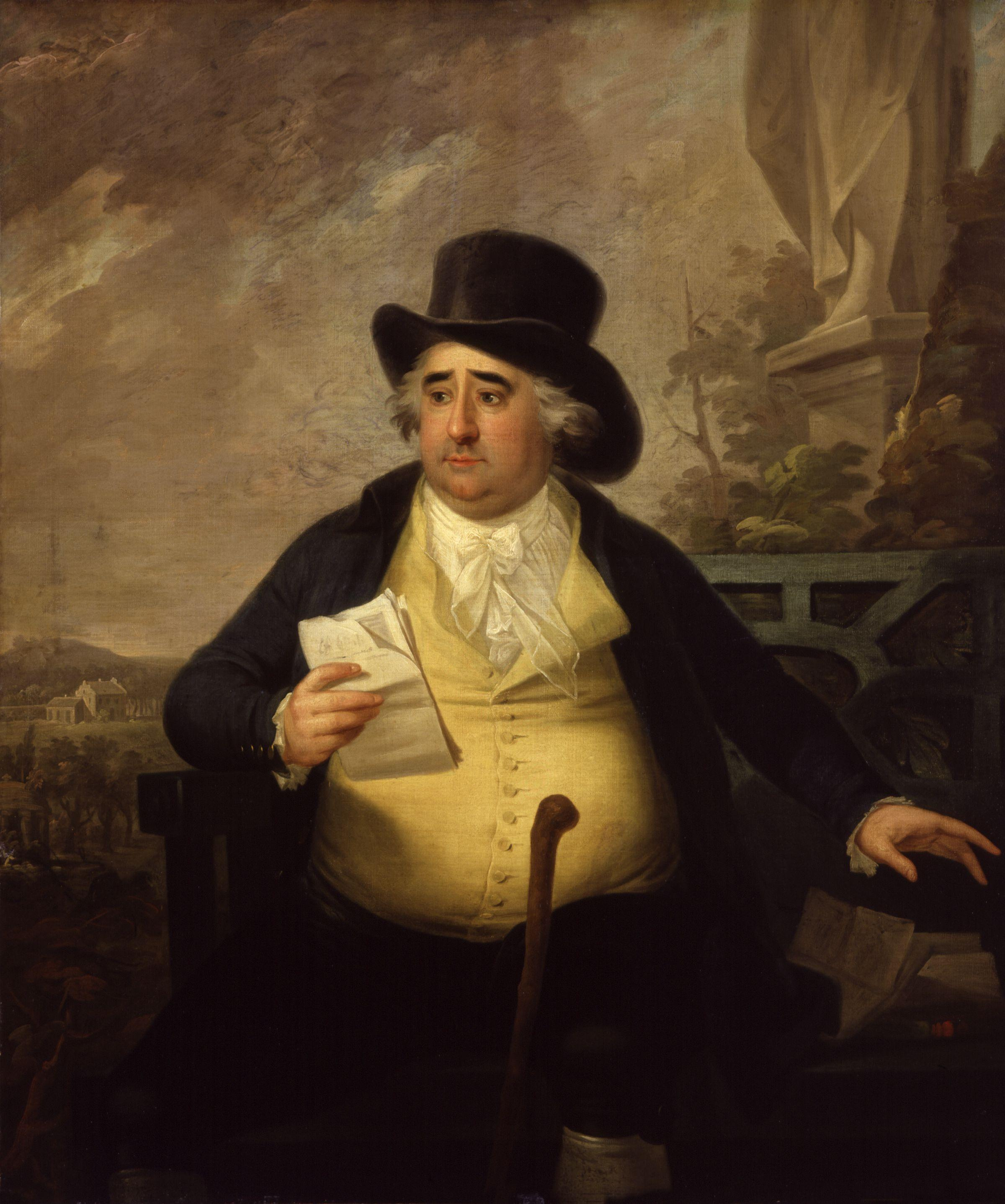
- Portrait of Charles James Fox by Karl Anton Hickel, 1794

Foreign Secretary
- In office 7 February 1806 – 13 September 1806
- Prime Minister: The Lord Grenville
- Preceded by: The Lord Mulgrave
- Succeeded by: Viscount Howick
- In office 2 April 1783 – 19 December 1783
- Prime Minister: The Duke of Portland
- Preceded by: The Lord Grantham
- Succeeded by: The Earl Temple
- In office 27 March 1782 – 5 July 1782
- Prime Minister: The Marquess of Rockingham
- Preceded by: The Viscount Stormont (Northern Secretary); The Earl of Hillsborough (Southern Secretary)
- Succeeded by: The Lord Grantham

Leader of the House of Commons
- In office 7 February 1806 – 13 September 1806
- Prime Minister: The Lord Grenville
- Preceded by: William Pitt the Younger
- Succeeded by: Viscount Howick
- In office 2 April 1783 – 19 December 1783 Serving with Lord North
- Prime Minister: The Duke of Portland
- Preceded by: Thomas Townshend
- Succeeded by: William Pitt the Younger
- In office 27 March 1782 – 5 July 1782
- Prime Minister: The Marquess of Rockingham
- Preceded by: Lord North
- Succeeded by: Thomas Townshend

Lord Commissioner of the Treasury
- In office 9 January 1773 – 18 February 1774
- Prime Minister: Lord North
- Preceded by: Charles Jenkinson
- Succeeded by: Viscount Beauchamp; Charles Wolfran Cornwall

Lord Commissioner of the Admiralty
- In office 28 February 1770 – 20 February 1772
- Prime Minister: Lord North
- Preceded by: Charles Townshend; Sir George Yonge, Bt
- Succeeded by: Thomas Bradshaw

Member of Parliament for Westminster
- In office 1785–1806
- Preceded by: Parliamentary scrutiny
- Succeeded by: Sir Alan Gardner, Bt; Earl Percy
- In office 1780–1784
- Preceded by: Viscount Malden; Lord Thomas Pelham-Clinton
- Succeeded by: Parliamentary scrutiny

Member of Parliament for Tain Burghs
- In office 1784–1785
- Preceded by: Charles Ross
- Succeeded by: George Ross

Member of Parliament for Malmesbury
- In office 1774–1780
- Preceded by: Earl of Donegall; Hon. Thomas Howard
- Succeeded by: Viscount Fairford; Viscount Lewisham

Member of Parliament for Midhurst
- In office 1768–1774
- Preceded by: John Burgoyne; Bamber Gascoyne
- Succeeded by: Herbert Mackworth; Clement Tudway

Personal details
- Born: 24 January 1749 London, England
- Died: 13 September 1806 (aged 57) Chiswick, Middlesex, England
- Resting place: Westminster Abbey
- Party: Whig (Foxite)
- Spouse: Elizabeth Armistead
- Parents: Henry Fox, 1st Baron Holland; Lady Caroline Lennox
- Relatives: Fox family
- Education: Eton College; Hertford College, Oxford
- Profession: Statesman, abolitionist

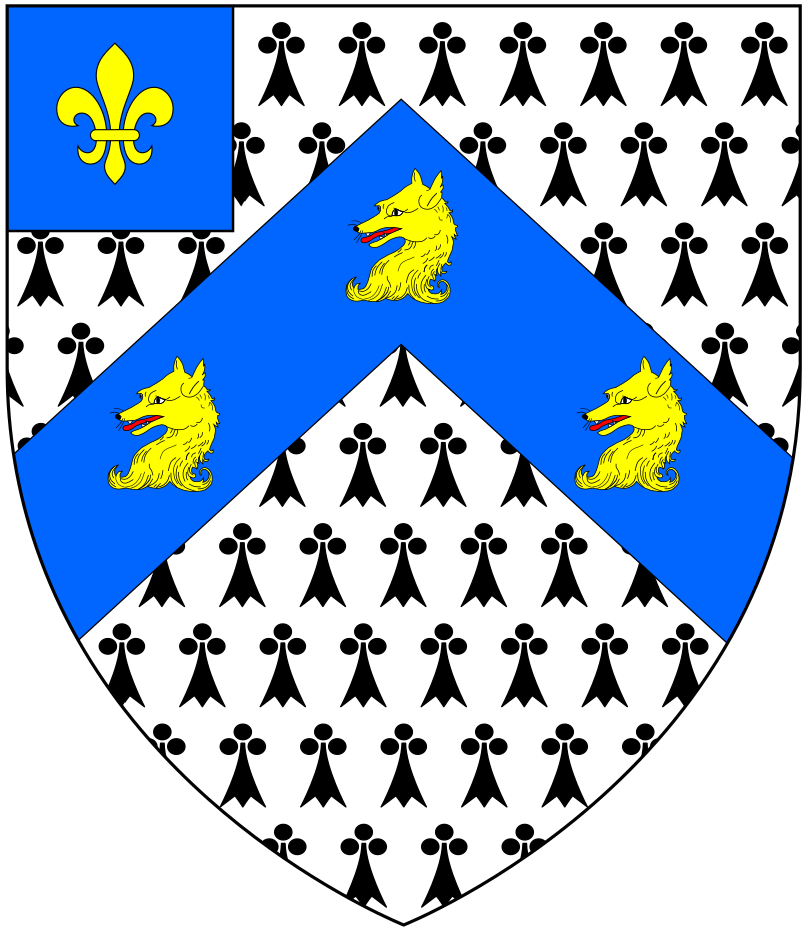
Canting arms of Fox, Baron Holland: Ermine, on a chevron azure three fox's heads and necks erased or on a canton of the second a fleur-de-lys of the third

Charles James Fox (24 January 1749 – 13 September 1806), styled The Honourable from 1762, was a British Whig statesman whose parliamentary career spanned 38 years of the late 18th and early 19th centuries. He was the arch-rival of the Tory politician William Pitt the Younger; his father Henry Fox, 1st Baron Holland, a leading Whig of his day, had similarly been the great rival of Pitt's famous father, William Pitt, 1st Earl of Chatham ("Pitt the Elder").

Fox rose to prominence in the House of Commons as a forceful and eloquent speaker with a notorious and colourful private life, though at that time with rather conservative and conventional opinions. However, with the coming of the American War of Independence and the influence of the Whig Edmund Burke, Fox's opinions evolved into some of the most radical to be aired in the British Parliament of his era.

Fox became a prominent and staunch opponent of King George III, whom he regarded as an aspiring tyrant. He supported the American Patriots and even dressed in the colours of George Washington's army. Briefly serving as Britain's first Foreign Secretary during the ministry of the Marquess of Rockingham in 1782, he returned to the post in a coalition government with his old enemy, Lord North, in 1783. However, the King forced Fox and North out of government before the end of the year and replaced them with the 24-year-old Pitt the Younger. Fox spent the following 22 years facing Pitt and the government from the opposition benches of the House of Commons.

Though Fox had little interest in the actual exercise of power and spent almost the entirety of his political career in opposition, he became noted as an anti-slavery campaigner, a supporter of the French Revolution and a leading parliamentary advocate of religious tolerance and individual liberty. His friendship with his mentor, Burke, and his parliamentary credibility were both casualties of Fox's support for France during the French Revolutionary Wars, but Fox went on to attack Pitt's wartime legislation and to defend the liberty of religious minorities and political radicals. After Pitt's death in January 1806, Fox served briefly as Foreign Secretary in the 'Ministry of All the Talents' of William Grenville before he died on 13 September 1806, aged 57.

== Early life: 1749–1758 ==
Fox was born in London on 24 January 1749, the second surviving son of Henry Fox, 1st Baron Holland, and Lady Caroline Lennox, a daughter of Charles Lennox, 2nd Duke of Richmond. Henry Fox (1705–1774) was an ally of Robert Walpole and rival of Pitt the Elder, and had amassed a considerable fortune by exploiting his position as Paymaster General of the Forces. Charles James Fox's elder brother Stephen (1745–1774) became the 2nd Baron Holland, and his younger brother Henry (1755–1811) had a distinguished military career.

Fox was the darling of his father, who found Charles "infinitely engaging & clever & pretty" and, from the time that his son was three years old, apparently preferred his company at meals to that of anyone else. The stories of Charles's over-indulgence by his doting father are legendary. It was said that Charles once expressed a great desire to break his father's watch and was not restrained or punished when he duly smashed it on the floor. On another occasion, when Henry had promised his son that he could watch the demolition of a wall on his estate and found that it had already been destroyed, he ordered the workmen to rebuild the wall and demolish it again, with Charles watching.

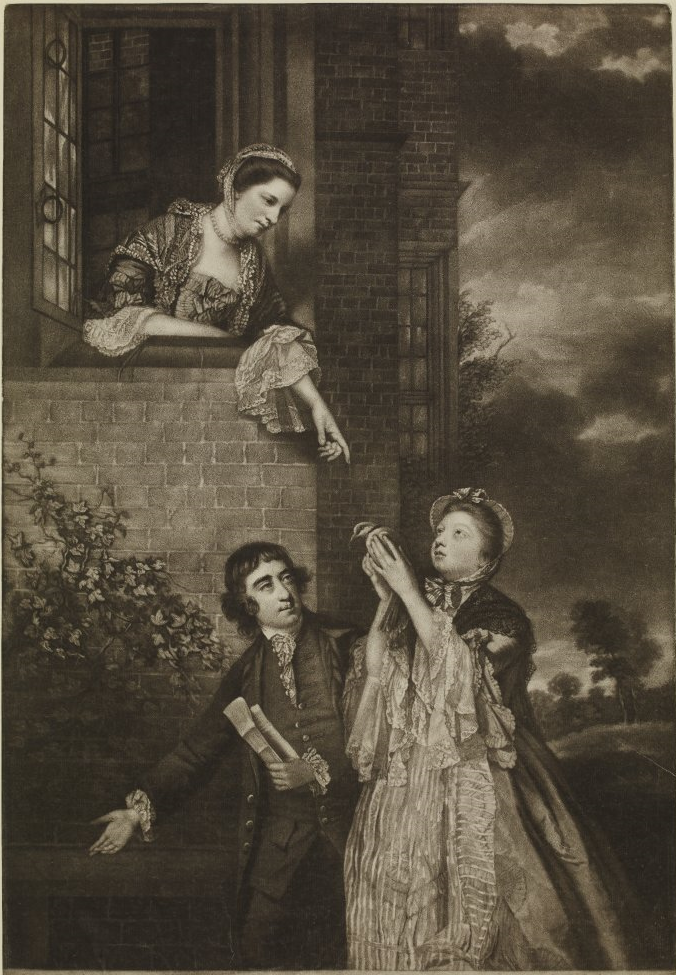
Mezzotint, Ladies Sarah Lennox and Susan Strangeways, with Charles James Fox (1762) at Holland House; after the original by Sir Joshua Reynolds, British Museum. Fox stands beside his first cousin Lady Susan Fox-Strangways (1743–1827), who holds a pigeon, whilst his aunt Lady Sarah Lennox (1745–1826) (his mother's youngest sister) leans out of a window above. In 1760, whilst at Eton College, Fox had developed a schoolboy crush on Susan and composed a prize-winning Latin verse describing a pigeon he found to deliver his love-letters to her "to please both Venus its mistress and him".

Given carte blanche to choose his own education, Fox in 1758 attended a fashionable Wandsworth school run by a Monsieur Pampellonne, followed by Eton College, where he began to develop his lifelong love of classical literature. In later life he was said to have always carried a copy of Horace in his coat pocket. He was taken out of school by his father in 1761 to attend the coronation of George III, who would become one of his most bitter enemies, and once more in 1763 to travel to the Continent (where he visited Paris and Spa). On this trip Charles was given a substantial amount of money with which to learn to gamble by his father, who also arranged for him to lose his virginity, aged fourteen, to a Madame de Quallens. Fox returned to Eton later that year, "attired in red-heeled shoes and Paris cut-velvet, adorned with a pigeon-wing hair style tinted with blue powder, and a newly acquired French accent", and was duly flogged by Dr. Barnard, the headmaster. Charles Fox was once known as a macaroni, a fashionable fellow, despite him being too overweight to look decent in his tight clothing. These three pursuits – gambling, womanising and the love of things and fashions foreign – would become, once inculcated in his adolescence, notorious habits of Fox's later life.

Fox entered Hertford College, Oxford, in October 1764. His tutor there was William Newcome. By the standards of aristocratic students, he worked hard while at Oxford, especially at mathematics. However, he was rather contemptuous of Oxford's "nonsenses". He left without graduating in spring 1766, to tour Europe with his family. He went on several further expeditions to Europe, becoming well known in the great Parisian salons, meeting influential figures such as Voltaire, Jean-Jaques Rousseau, David Hume, Edward Gibbon, the duc d'Orléans, and the Marquis de Lafayette, and becoming the co-owner of a number of racehorses with the duc de Lauzun.

== Early career: 1768–1774 ==
=== Member of Parliament ===
For the 1768 general election, Henry Fox bought his son a seat in Parliament for the West Sussex constituency of Midhurst, though Charles was still nineteen and technically ineligible for Parliament. Fox was to address the House of Commons some 254 times between 1768 and 1774 and rapidly gathered a reputation as a superb orator, but he had not yet developed the radical opinions for which he would become famous. Thus, he spent much of his early years unwittingly manufacturing ammunition for his later critics and their accusations of hypocrisy. A supporter of the Grafton and North ministries, Fox was prominent in the campaign to punish the radical John Wilkes for challenging the Commons. "He thus opened his career by speaking in behalf of the Commons against the people and their elected representative." Consequently, both Fox and his brother Stephen were insulted and pelted with mud in the street by the pro-Wilkes London crowds.

Between 1770 and 1774, Fox's seemingly promising career in the political establishment was spoiled. He was appointed to the Board of Admiralty by Lord North in February 1770, but on the 15th of the same month, he resigned due to his enthusiastic opposition to the government's Royal Marriages Act, the provisions of which – incidentally – cast doubt on the legitimacy of his parents' marriage. On 28 December 1772, North appointed him to the board of the Treasury; in February 1774, Fox again surrendered his post, this time over the Government's allegedly feeble response to the contemptuous printing and public distribution of copies of parliamentary debates. Behind these incidents lay his family's resentment towards Lord North for refusing to elevate the Holland barony to an earldom. But the fact that such a young man could seemingly treat ministerial office so lightly was noted at court. In 1773 he was taken advantage of by the swindler Elizabeth Harriet Grieve. She had lent him £300 for which she got his name to use as a customer of her advice. Fox was promised that Grieve could arrange a marriage for him to a West Indian heiress named Miss Phipps. Fox was so taken in that he started to powder his eyebrows in order that he might appeal to her. Grieve was eventually sent to trial but the resulting scandal resulted in news stories, rhymes and a play at the Theatre Royal, Haymarket. George III, also observing Fox's licentious private behaviour, took it to be presumption and judged that Fox could not be trusted to take anything seriously.

After 1774, Fox began to reconsider his political position under the influence of Edmund Burke – who had sought out the promising young Whig and would become his mentor – and the unfolding events in America. He drifted from his rather non-ideological family-oriented politics into the orbit of the Rockingham Whig party.

During this period, Fox became possibly the most prominent and vituperative parliamentary critic of Lord North and the conduct of the American War. In 1775, he denounced North in the Commons as

the blundering pilot who had brought the nation into its present difficulties ... Lord Chatham, the King of Prussia, nay, Alexander the Great, never gained more in one campaign than the noble lord has lost – he has lost a whole continent.

=== American Revolution ===
Fox, who occasionally corresponded with Thomas Jefferson and had met Benjamin Franklin in Paris, correctly predicted that Britain had little practical hope of subduing the colonies and interpreted the American cause approvingly as a struggle for liberty against the oppressive policies of a despotic and unaccountable executive. It was at this time that Fox and his supporters took up the habit of dressing in buff and blue, the colours of the uniforms in Washington's army. Fox's friend, the Earl of Carlisle, observed that any setback for the British Government in America was "a great cause of amusement to Charles." Even after the Battle of Long Island in 1776, Fox stated that

I hope that it will be a point of honour among us all to support the American pretensions in adversity as much as we did in their prosperity, and that we shall never desert those who have acted unsuccessfully upon Whig principles.

On 31 October the same year, Fox responded to the King's address to Parliament with "one of his finest and most animated orations, and with severity to the answered person", so much so that, when he sat down, no member of the Government would attempt to reply.

Fox shared a mutual antipathy with George III that profoundly shaped Fox's political career. George III was among the most enthusiastic prosecutors of the American Revolutionary War. Fox became convinced that George III was determined to challenge the authority of Parliament and the balance of the constitution established in the Glorious Revolution of 1688 to achieve a continental-style tyranny. George III in return thought that Fox had "cast off every principle of common honour and honesty ... [a man who is] as contemptible as he is odious ... [and has an] aversion to all restraints." On 6 April 1780 John Dunning, 1st Baron Ashburton introduced a motion, asking that "The influence of the Crown has increased, is increasing, and ought to be diminished". It was passed by the Commons in a vote of 233 to 215. Fox thought that the motion is "glorious", saying on 24 April that:

the question now was ... whether that beautiful fabric [i.e. the constitution] ... was to be maintained in that freedom ... for which blood had been spilt; or whether we were to submit to that system of despotism, which had so many advocates in this country.

Fox, however, had not been present in the House of parliament for the beginning of the Dunning debate, as he had been occupied in the adjoining eleventh-century Westminster Hall, serving as chairman of a mass public meeting before a large banner that read "Annual Parliaments and Equal Representation". This was the period when Fox, hardening against the influence of the British Crown, was embraced by the radical movement of the late eighteenth century. When the shocking Gordon riots exploded in London in June 1780, Fox, though deploring the violence of the crowd, declared that he would "much rather be governed by a mob than a standing army." Later, in July, Fox was returned for the populous and prestigious parliamentary constituency of Westminster, with around 12,000 electors, and acquired the title "Man of the People".

== Foreign Secretary: 1782–1783 ==
=== Fox-North Coalition ===
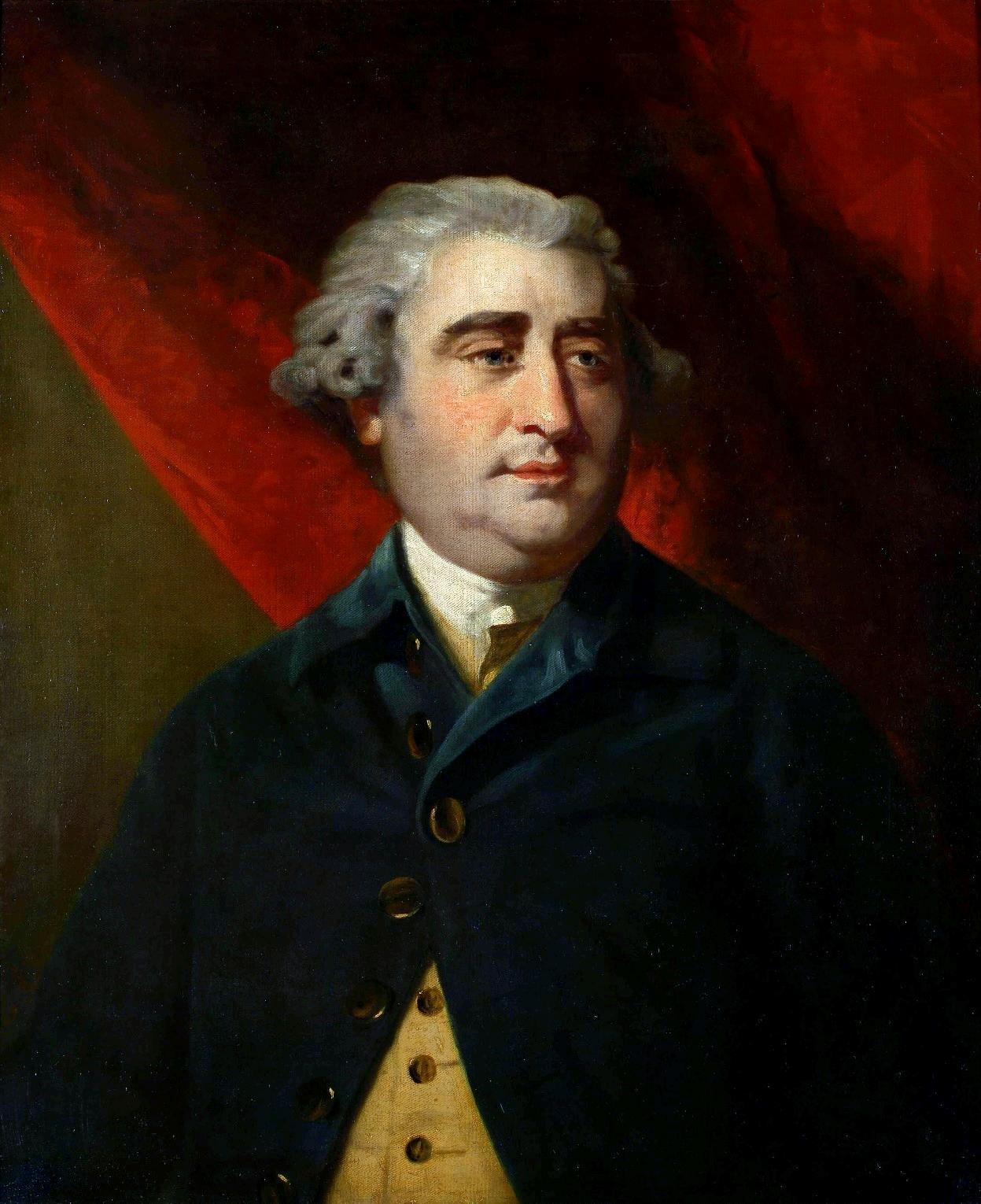
Charles James Fox (1782) by Joshua Reynolds

When North finally resigned under the strains of office and the disastrous American War in March 1782, after Earl Cornwallis surrendered at the Battle of Yorktown, and was gingerly replaced with the new ministry of the Marquess of Rockingham, Fox was appointed Foreign Secretary. But Rockingham, after finally acknowledging the independence of the former Thirteen Colonies, died unexpectedly on 1 July. Fox refused to serve in the successor administration of the Earl of Shelburne, splitting the Whig party; Fox's father had been convinced that Shelburne – a supporter of the elder Pitt – had thwarted his ministerial ambitions at the time of the Treaty of Paris in 1763. Fox now found himself in common opposition to Shelburne with his old and bitter enemy, Lord North. Based on this single conjunction of interests and the fading memory of the happy co-operation of the early 1770s, the two men who had vilified one another throughout the American war together formed a coalition and forced their Government, with an overwhelming majority composed of North's Tories and Fox's opposition Whigs, on to the King.

The Fox-North Coalition came to power on 2 April 1783, in spite of the King's resistance. It was the first time that George had been allowed no role in determining who should hold government office. On one occasion, Fox, who returned enthusiastically to the post of Foreign Secretary, ended an epistle to the King: "Whenever Your Majesty will be graciously pleased to condescend even to hint your inclinations upon any subject, that it will be the study of Your Majesty's Ministers to show how truly sensible they are of Your Majesty's goodness." The King replied: "No answer." George III seriously thought of abdicating at this time, after the comprehensive defeat of his American policy and the imposition of Fox and North, but refrained from doing so, mainly because of the thought of his succession by his son George, Prince of Wales, the notoriously extravagant womaniser, gambler and associate of Fox. Indeed, in many ways the King considered Fox his son's tutor in debauchery. "George III let it be widely broadcast that he held Fox principally responsible for the Prince's many failings, not least a tendency to vomit in public."

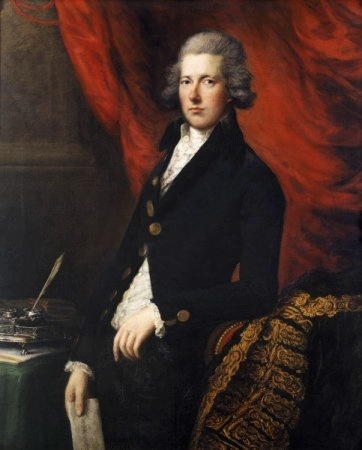
1792 Portrait of William Pitt the Younger, attributed to Gainsborough Dupont

=== Constitutional crisis ===
Happily for George, the unpopular coalition would not outlast the year. The Treaty of Paris was signed on 3 September 1783, formally ending the American Revolutionary War. Fox proposed an East India Bill to place the government of the ailing and oppressive British East India Company, at that time in control of a considerable expanse of India, on a sounder footing with a board of governors responsible to Parliament and more resistant to Crown patronage. It passed the Commons by 153 to 80, but, when the King made it clear that any peer who voted in favour of the bill would be considered a personal enemy of the Crown, the Lords divided against Fox by 95 to 76. George III now felt justified in dismissing Fox and North from government and in nominating Pitt the Younger in their place, the King appointed the youngest British prime minister to date at twenty-four years of age. Fox used his parliamentary majority to oppose Pitt's nomination, and every subsequent measure that he put before the House, until March 1784, when the King dissolved Parliament and, in the following 1784 British general election, Pitt was returned with a substantial majority.

In Fox's own constituency of Westminster, the contest was particularly fierce. An energetic campaign in his favour was run by Georgiana, Duchess of Devonshire, allegedly a lover of Fox's who was said to have won at least one vote for him by kissing a shoemaker with a rather romantic idea of what constituted a bribe. In the end, Fox was re-elected by a very slender margin, but legal challenges encouraged, to an extent, by Pitt and the King prevented a final declaration of the result for over a year. In the meantime, Fox sat for the Scottish pocket borough of Tain or Northern Burghs, for which he was qualified by being made an unlikely burgess of Kirkwall in Orkney. The experience of these years was crucial in Fox's political formation. His suspicions had been confirmed. It seemed to him that George III had personally scuppered both the Rockingham-Shelburne and Fox-North governments, interfered in the legislative process and now dissolved Parliament when its composition inconvenienced him. Pitt, a man of little property and no party, seemed to Fox a blatant tool of the Crown.

However, the King and Pitt had great popular support, and many in the press and general population saw Fox as the trouble-maker challenging the composition of the constitution and the King's remaining powers. He was often caricatured as Oliver Cromwell and Guy Fawkes during this period, as well as Satan.

== Opposition: 1783–1797 ==
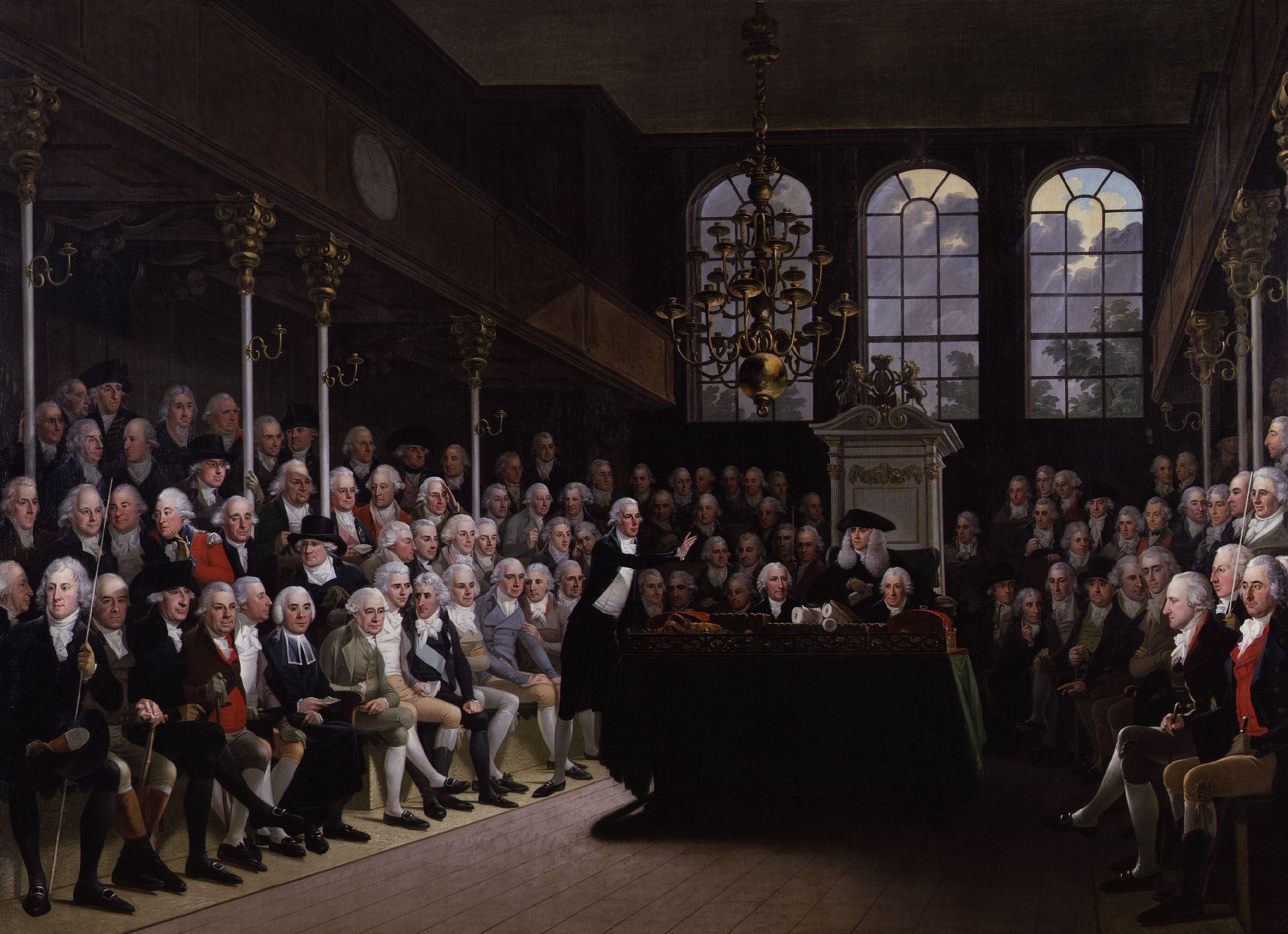
Pitt facing Fox in Anton Hickel's The House of Commons, 1793–94

One of Pitt's first major actions as prime minister was, in 1785, to put a scheme of parliamentary reform before the Commons, proposing to rationalise somewhat the existing, decidedly unrepresentative, electoral system by eliminating thirty-six rotten boroughs and redistributing seats to represent London and the larger counties. Fox supported Pitt's reforms, despite apparent political expediency, but they were defeated by 248 to 174. Reform would not be considered seriously by Parliament for another decade.

In 1787, the most dramatic political event of the decade came to pass in the form of the Impeachment of Warren Hastings, the Governor of Bengal until 1785, on charges of corruption and extortion. Fifteen of the eighteen Managers appointed to the trial were Foxites, one of them being Fox himself. Although the matter was really Burke's area of expertise, Fox was, at first, enthusiastic. If the trial could demonstrate the misrule of British India by Hastings and the East India Company more widely, then Fox's India Bill of 1784 – the point on which the Fox-North Coalition had been dismissed by the King – would be vindicated. The trial was also expedient for Fox in that it placed Pitt in an uncomfortable political position. The premier was forced to equivocate over the Hastings trial, because to oppose Hastings would have been to endanger the support of the King and the East India Company, while to support him openly would have alienated country gentlemen and principled supporters like Wilberforce. As the trial's intricacies dragged on (it would be 1795 before Hastings was finally acquitted), Fox's interest waned and the burden of managing the trial devolved increasingly on Burke.

=== The Regency Crisis ===
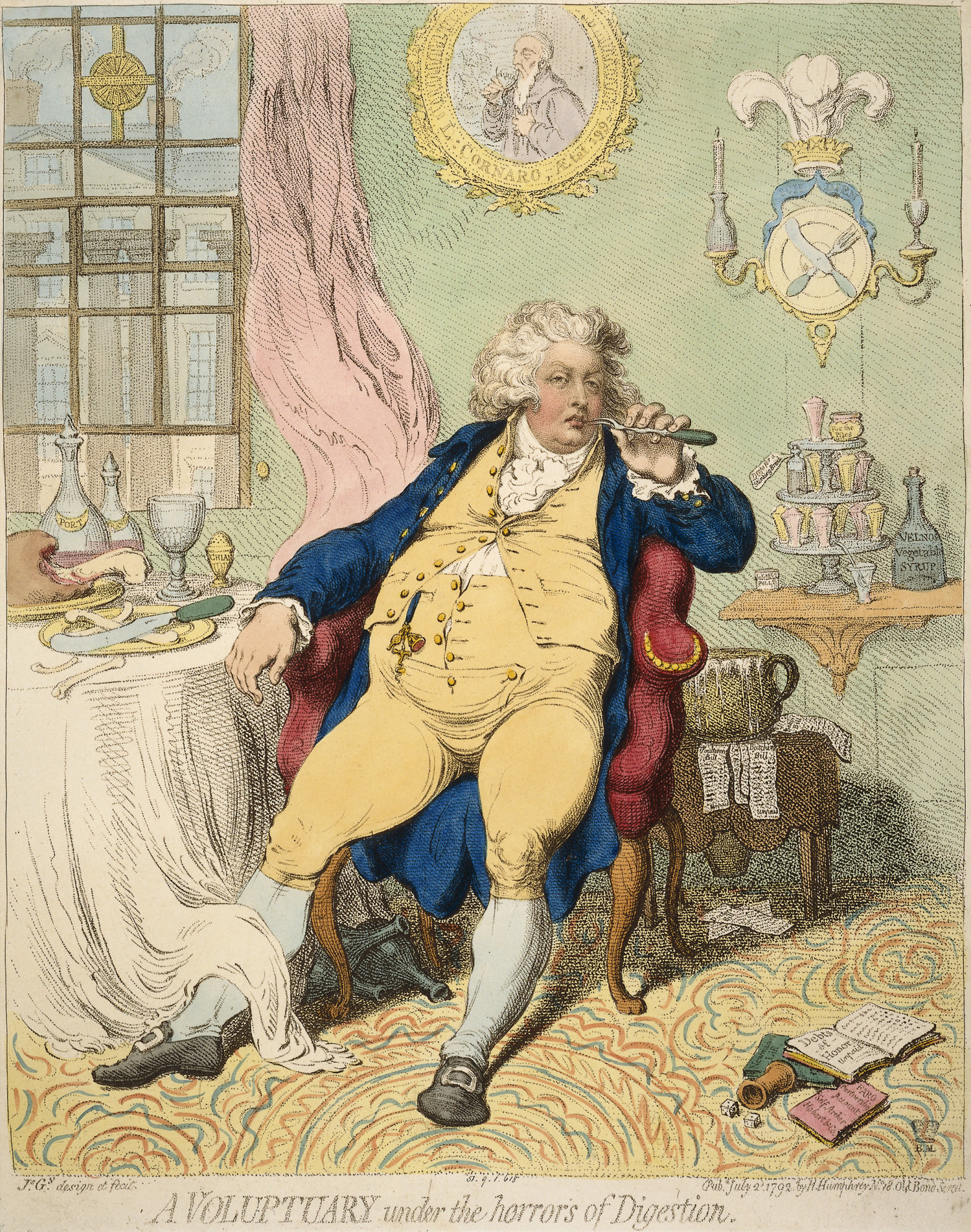
A Gillray caricature of the Prince of Wales, an ally of Fox

In late October 1788, George III descended into a bout of mental illness. He had declared that Pitt was "a rascal" and Fox "his friend". The King was placed under restraint, and a rumour went round that Fox had poisoned him. Thus the opportunity revealed itself for the establishment of a regency under Fox's friend and ally, the Prince of Wales, which would take the reins of government out of the hands of the incapacitated George III and allow the replacement of his "minion" Pitt with a Foxite ministry.

Fox, however, was incommunicado in Italy as the crisis broke; he had resolved not to read any newspapers while he was abroad, except the racing reports. Three weeks passed before he returned to Britain on 25 November 1788, and then he was taken seriously ill (partly due to the stress of his rapid journey across Europe). He would not recover entirely until December 1789. He again absented himself to Bath from 27 January to 21 February 1789.

When Fox did make it into Parliament, he seemed to make a serious political error. In the Commons on 10 December, he declared that it was the right of the Prince of Wales to install himself as regent immediately. It is said that Pitt, upon hearing this, slapped his thigh in an uncharacteristic display of emotion and declared that he would "unwhig" Fox for the rest of his life. Fox's argument did indeed seem to contradict his lifelong championing of Parliament's rights over the Crown. Pitt pointed out that the Prince of Wales had no more right to the throne than any other Briton, though he might well have a better claim to it as the King's firstborn son. It was Parliament's constitutional right to decide who the monarch could be.

There was more than naked thirst for power in Fox's seemingly hypocritical Tory assertion. Fox believed that the King's illness was permanent, and therefore that George III was, constitutionally speaking, dead. To challenge the Prince of Wales's right to succeed him would be to challenge fundamental contemporary assumptions about property rights and primogeniture. Pitt, on the other hand, considered the King's madness temporary (or, at least, hoped that it would be), and thus saw the throne not as vacant but as merely temporarily unoccupied.

While Fox drew up lists for his proposed Cabinet under the new Prince Regent, Pitt spun out the legalistic debates over the constitutionality of and precedents for instituting a regency, as well as the actual process of drawing up a Regency Bill and navigating it through Parliament. He negotiated a number of restrictions on the powers of the Prince of Wales as regent (which would later provide the basis of the Regency Act 1811), but the bill finally passed the Commons on 12 February. As the Lords too prepared to pass it, they learned that the King's health was improving and decided to postpone further action. The king soon regained lucidity in time to prevent the establishment of his son's regency and the elevation of Fox to the premiership, and, on 23 April, a service of thanksgiving was conducted at St Paul's in honour of George III's return to health. Fox's opportunity had passed.

=== French Revolution ===
The Storming of the Bastille on 14 July 1789

Fox welcomed the French Revolution of 1789, interpreting it as a late Continental imitation of Britain's Glorious Revolution of 1688. In response to the Storming of the Bastille on 14 July, he famously declared, "How much the greatest event it is that ever happened in the world! and how much the best!" In April 1791, Fox told the Commons that he "admired the new constitution of France, considered altogether, as the most stupendous and glorious edifice of liberty, which had been erected on the foundation of human integrity in any time or country." He was thus somewhat bemused by the reaction of his old Whig friend, Edmund Burke, to the dramatic events across the Channel. In his Reflections on the Revolution in France, Burke warned that the revolution was a violent rebellion against tradition and proper authority, motivated by Utopian, abstract ideas disconnected from reality, which would lead to anarchy and eventual dictatorship. Fox read the book and found it "in very bad taste" and "favouring Tory principles", but avoided pressing the matter for a while to preserve his relationship with Burke. The more radical Whigs, like Sheridan, broke with Burke more readily at this point.

Fox instead turned his attention – despite the politically volatile situation – to repealing the Test and Corporation Acts, which restricted the liberties of Dissenters and Catholics. On 2 March 1790, Fox gave a long and eloquent speech to a packed House of Commons.

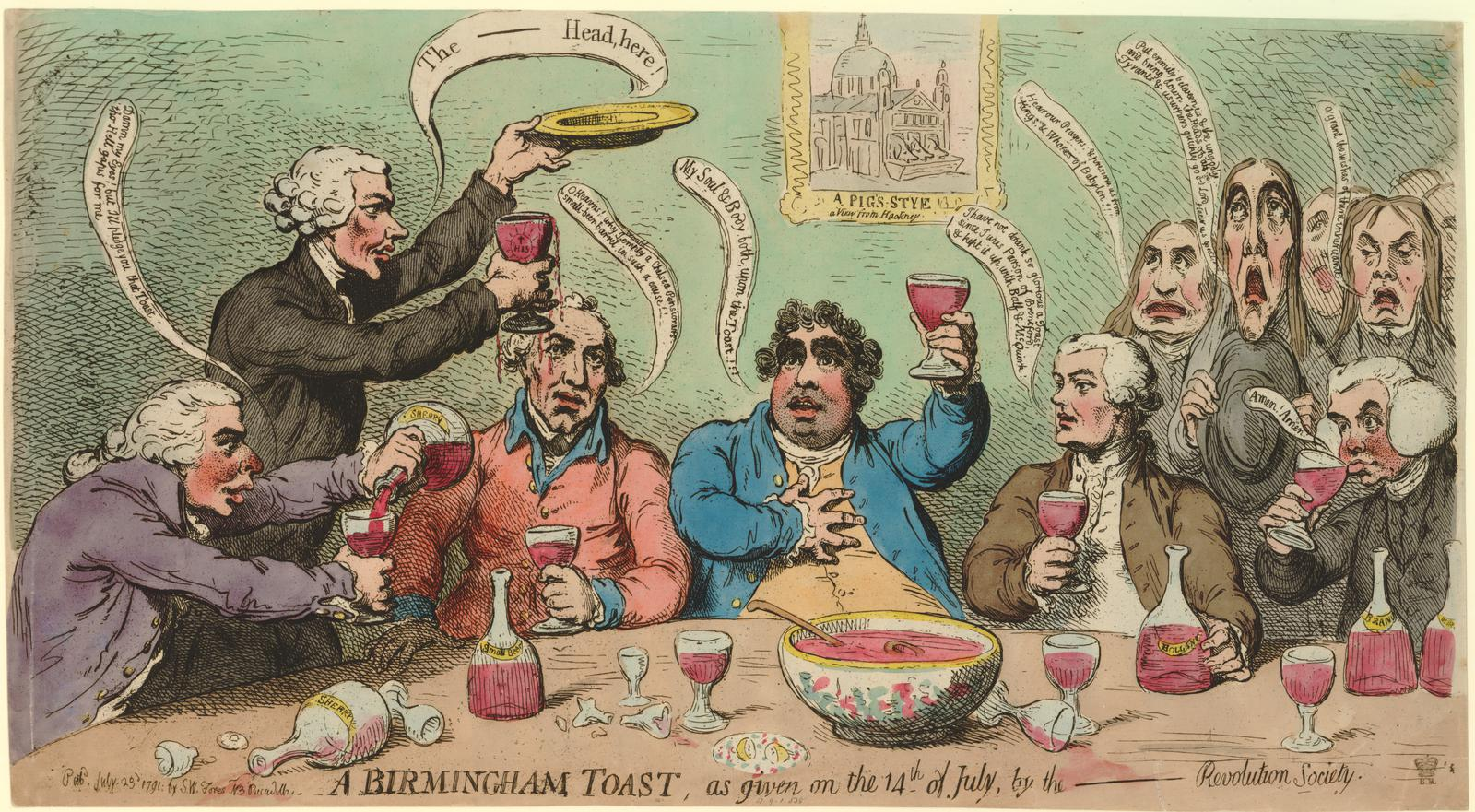
A Birmingham toast, as given on the 14 July: Fox is caricatured by Gillray as toasting the anniversary of the Storming of the Bastille with Joseph Priestley and other Dissenters (23 July 1791)

Persecution always says, 'I know the consequences of your opinion better than you know them yourselves.' But the language of toleration was always amicable, liberal, and just: it confessed its doubts, and acknowledged its ignorance ... Persecution had always reasoned from cause to effect, from opinion to action, [that such an opinion would invariably lead to but one action], which proved generally erroneous; while toleration led us invariably to form just conclusions, by judging from actions and not from opinions.

Pitt, in turn, came to the defence of the Acts as adopted

by the wisdom of our ancestors to serve as a bulwark to the Church, whose constituency was so intimately connected with that of the state, that the safety of the one was always liable to be affected by any danger which might threaten the other.

Burke, with fear of the radical upheaval in France foremost in his mind, took Pitt's side in the debate, dismissing Nonconformists as "men of factious and dangerous principles", to which Fox replied that Burke's "strange dereliction from his former principles ... filled him with grief and shame". Fox's motion was defeated in the Commons by 294 votes to 105.

Later, Fox successfully supported the Roman Catholic Relief Act 1791, extending the rights of British Catholics. He explained his stance to his Roman Catholic friend, Charles Butler, declaring:

the best ground, and the only ground to be defended in all points is, that action, not principle is the object of law and legislation; with a person's principles no government has any right to interfere.

On the world stage of 1791, war with Great Britain was threatened more with Spain and Russia than revolutionary France. Fox opposed the bellicose stances of Pitt's ministry in the Nootka Sound crisis and over the Russian occupation of the Turkish port of Ochakiv on the Black Sea. Fox contributed to the peaceful resolution of these entanglements and gained a new admirer in Catherine the Great, who bought a bust of Fox and placed it between Cicero and Demosthenes in her collection. On 18 April, Fox spoke in the Commons – together with William Wilberforce, Pitt and Burke – in favour of a measure to abolish the slave trade, but – despite their combined rhetorical talents – the vote went against them by a majority of 75.

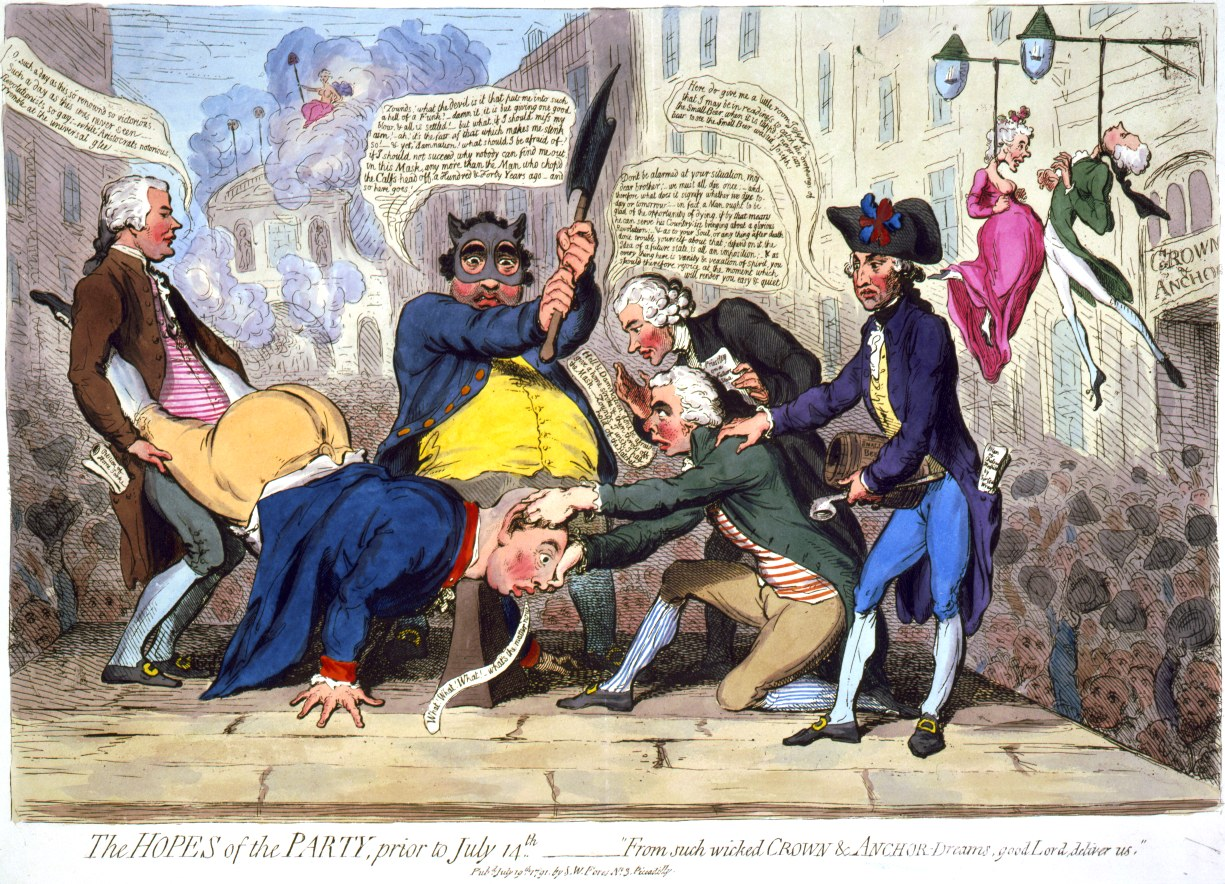
In The Hopes of the Party (1791), Gillray caricatured Fox with an axe about to strike off the head of George III, in imitation of the French Revolution.

On 6 May 1791, a tearful confrontation on the floor of the Commons finally shattered the quarter-century friendship of Fox and Burke, as the latter dramatically crossed the floor of the House to sit down next to Pitt, taking the support of a good deal of the more conservative Whigs with him. Officially, and rather irrelevantly, this happened during a debate on the particulars of a bill for the government of Canada. Later, on his deathbed in 1797, Burke would have his wife turn Fox away rather than allow a final reconciliation.

=== "Pitt's Terror" ===
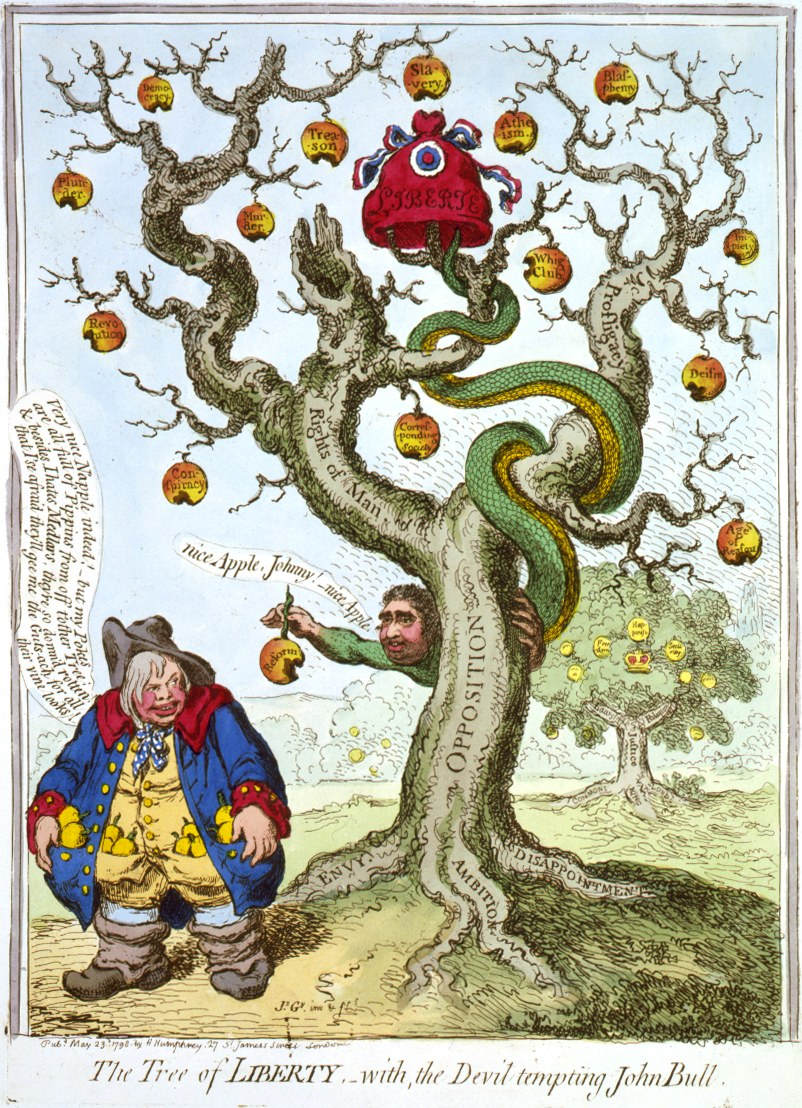
The Tree of LIBERTY, – with, the Devil tempting John Bull (1798): Fox is caricatured by Gillray as Satan, tempting John Bull with the rotten fruit of the opposition's Tree of liberty.

Fox continued to defend the French Revolution, even as its fruits began to collapse into war, repression and the Reign of Terror. Though there were few developments in France after 1792 that Fox could positively favour, Fox maintained that the old monarchical system still proved a greater threat to liberty than the new, degenerating experiment in France. Fox thought of revolutionary France as the lesser of two evils and emphasised the role of traditional despots in perverting the course of the revolution: he argued that Louis XVI and the French aristocracy had brought their fates upon themselves by abusing the constitution of 1791 and that the coalition of European autocrats, which was currently dispatching its armies against France's borders, had driven the revolutionary government to desperate and bloody measures by exciting a profound national crisis. Fox was not surprised when Pitt and the King brought Britain into the war as well and would afterwards blame the pair and their prodigal European subsidies for the long-drawn-out continuation of the French Revolutionary Wars. In 1795, he wrote to his nephew, Lord Holland:

Peace is the wish of the French of Italy Spain Germany and all the world, and Great Britain alone the cause of preventing its accomplishment, and this not for any point of honour or even interest, but merely lest there should be an example in the modern world of a great powerful Republic.

Rather ironically, while Fox was being denounced by many in Britain as a Jacobin traitor, across the Channel he featured on a 1798 list of the Britons to be transported after a successful French invasion of Britain. According to the document, Fox was a "false patriot; having often insulted the French nation in his speeches, and particularly in 1786." According to one of his biographers, Fox's "loyalties were not national but were offered to people like himself at home or abroad". In 1805 Francis Horner wrote, "I could name to you gentlemen, with good coats on, and good sense in their own affairs, who believe that Fox...is actually in the pay of France".

But Fox's radical position soon became too extreme for many of his followers, particularly old Whig friends like the Duke of Portland, Earl Fitzwilliam and the Earl of Carlisle. Around July 1794 their fear of France outgrew their resentment towards Pitt for his actions in 1784, and they crossed the floor to the Government benches. Fox could not believe that they "would disgrace" themselves in such a way. After these defections, the Foxites could no longer constitute a credible parliamentary opposition, reduced, as they were, to some fifty MPs.

Fox, however, still insisted on challenging the repressive wartime legislation introduced by Pitt in the 1790s that would become known as "Pitt's Terror". In 1792, Fox had seen through the only piece of substantial legislation in his career, the Libel Act 1792 (32 Geo. 3. c. 60), which restored to juries the right to decide what was and was not libellous, in addition to whether a defendant was guilty. E. P. Thompson thought it "Fox's greatest service to the common people, passed at the eleventh hour before the tide turned toward repression." Indeed, the act was passed by Parliament on 21 May, the same day as a royal proclamation against seditious writings was issued, and more libel cases would be brought by the government in the following two years than had been in all the preceding years of the eighteenth century.

Fox spoke in opposition to the King's Speech on 13 December 1793, but was defeated in the subsequent division by 290 to 50. He argued against war measures like the stationing of Hessian troops in Britain, the employment of royalist French émigrés in the British army and, most of all, Pitt's suspension of habeas corpus in 1794. He told the Commons that:

We had no invasion to fear but an invasion of the constitution.

In 1795, the King's carriage was assaulted in the street, providing an excuse for Pitt to introduce the infamous Two Acts: the Seditious Meetings Act 1795, which prohibited unlicensed gatherings of over fifty people, and the Treasonable Practices Act, which greatly widened the legal definition of treason, making any assault on the constitution punishable by seven years' transportation. Fox spoke ten times in the debate on the acts. He argued that, according to the principles of the proposed legislation, Pitt should have been transported a decade before in 1785, when he had been advocating parliamentary reform. Fox warned the Commons that:

if you silence remonstrance and stifle complaint, you then leave no other alternative but force and violence.

He argued that "the best security for the due maintenance of the constitution was in the strict and incessant vigilance of the people over parliament itself. Meetings of the people, therefore, for the discussion of public objects were not merely legal, but laudable."

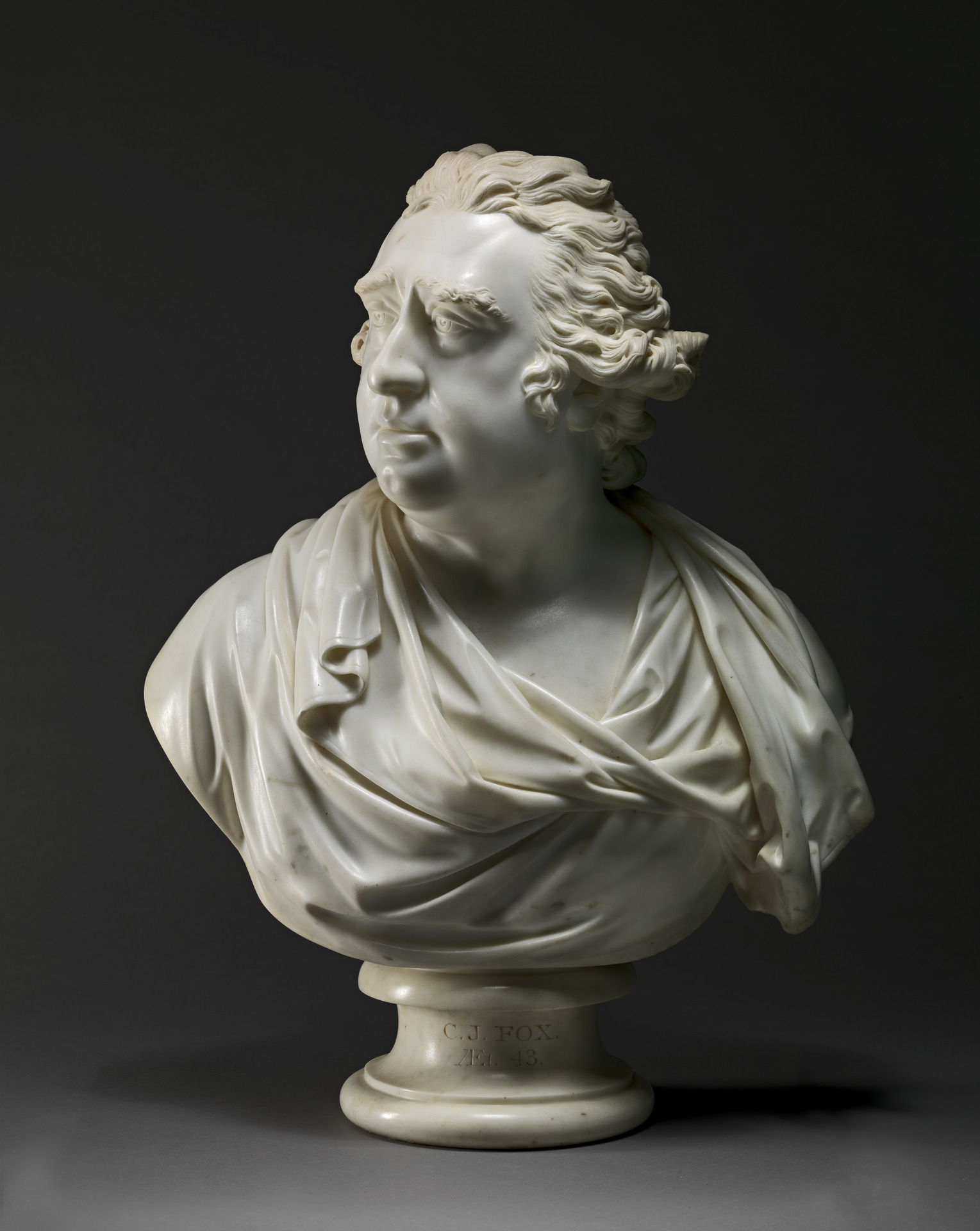
Marble bust of Fox by Joseph Nollekens, 1792. Yale Center for British Art

Parliament passed the acts. But Fox enjoyed a swell of extra-parliamentary support during the course of the controversy. A substantial petitioning movement arose in support of him, and on 16 November 1795, he addressed a public meeting of between two- and thirty-thousand people on the subject. However, this came to nothing in the long run. The Foxites were becoming disenchanted with the Commons, overwhelmingly dominated by Pitt, and began to denounce it to one another as unrepresentative.

== Political wilderness: 1797–1806 ==
=== Later life ===
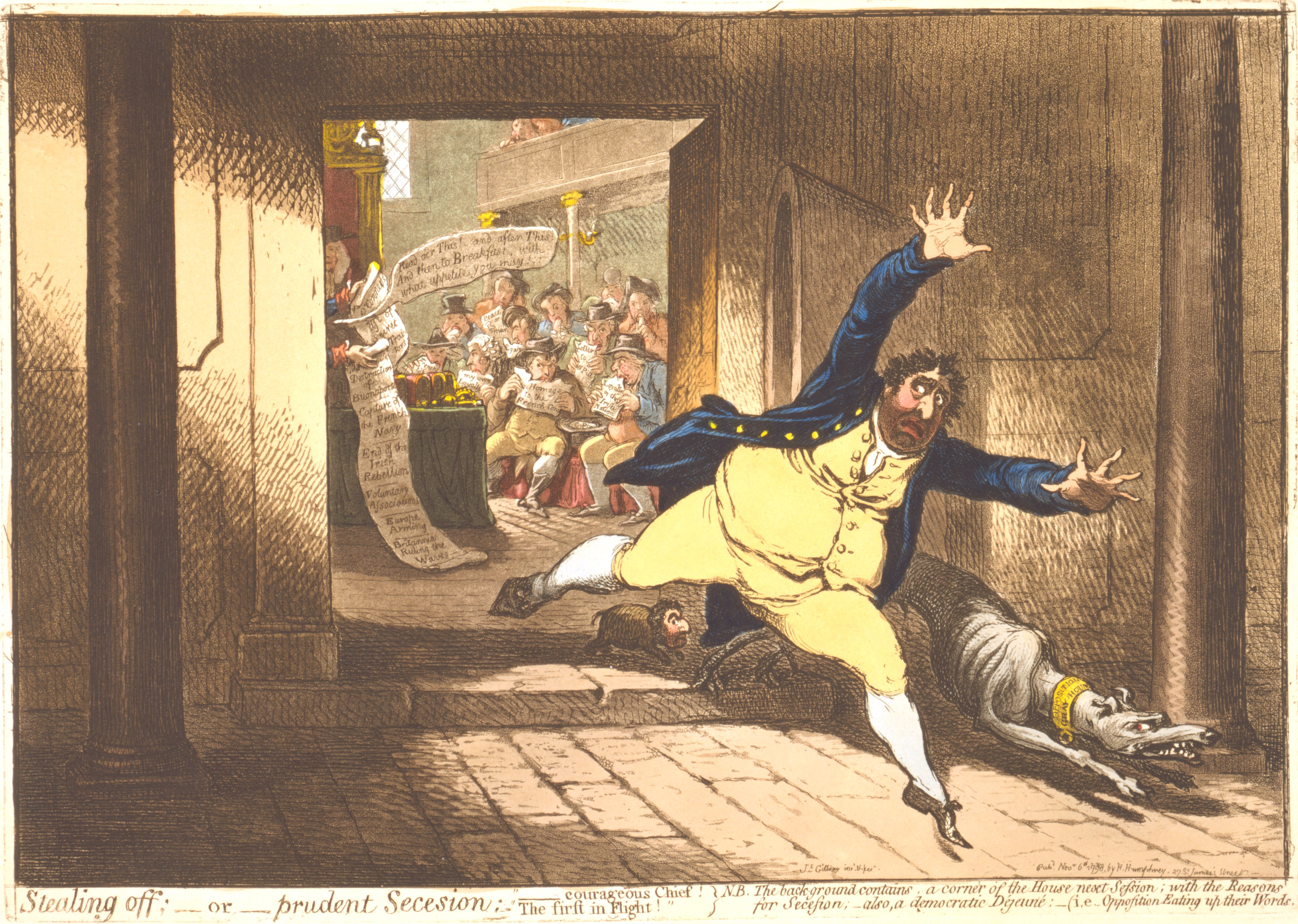
In Stealing off (1798), Gillray caricatured Fox's secession from Parliament.

By May 1797, an overwhelming majority – both in and outside of Parliament – had formed in support of Pitt's war against France.

Fox's following in Parliament had shrivelled to about 25, compared with around 55 in 1794 and at least 90 during the 1780s. Many of the Foxites purposefully seceded from Parliament in 1797; Fox himself retired for lengthy periods to his wife's house in Surrey. The distance from the stress and noise of Westminster was an enormous psychological and spiritual relief to Fox, but still he defended his earlier principles: "It is a great comfort to me to reflect how steadily I have opposed this war, for the miseries it seems likely to produce are without end." On 1 May 1798, Fox proposed a toast to "Our Sovereign, the Majesty of the People". The Duke of Norfolk had made the same toast in January at Fox's birthday dinner and had been dismissed as Lord Lieutenant of the West Riding of Yorkshire as a result. Pitt thought of sending Fox to the Tower of London for the duration of the parliamentary session but instead removed him from the Privy Council. Fox believed that it was "impossible to support the Revolution [of 1688] and the Brunswick Succession upon any other principle" than the sovereignty of the people.

After Pitt's resignation in February 1801, Fox had undertaken a partial return to politics. Having opposed the Addington ministry (though he approved of its negotiation of the Treaty of Amiens) as a Pitt-style tool of the King, Fox gravitated towards the Grenvillite faction, which shared his support for Catholic emancipation and composed the only parliamentary alternative to a coalition with the Pittites.

During the French Revolutionary Wars, Fox supported the French Republic against the monarchies that comprised the Second Coalition. Fox thought the coup d'état of 1799 that brought Napoleon to power "a very bad beginning ... the manner of the thing [was] quite odious", but he was convinced that the French leader sincerely desired peace in order to consolidate his rule and rebuild his shattered country.

By July 1800, Fox had "forgiven" the means by which he had come into power and claimed Napoleon had "surpassed...Alexander & Caesar, not to mention the great advantage he has over them in the Cause he fights in". In October 1801, a preliminary peace agreement between Britain and France was published and Fox was delighted. In a speech to his constituents on 10 October Fox said, "We have not, I acknowledge, obtained the objects for which the War was undertaken – so much the better – I rejoice that we have not. I like the Peace the more on this very account". Many of his friends were shocked at such open language, but as Fox said in his reply to a remonstrance from Grey: "...the truth is, I am gone something further in hate to the English Government than perhaps you and the rest of my friends are, and certainly further than can with prudence be avowed. The triumph of the French Government over the English does in fact afford me a degree of pleasure which it is very difficult to disguise".

After the subsequent Treaty of Amiens was signed in March 1802, Fox joined the thousands of English tourists flocking across the Channel to see the sights of the revolution. Fox and his retinue were kept under surveillance by officials from the British embassy during their trip of 20 July to 17 November. In Paris, he presented his wife for the first time in seven years of marriage, creating yet another stir back at court in London, and had three interviews with Napoleon, who – though he tried to flatter his most prominent British sympathiser – had to spend most of the time arguing about the freedom of the press and the perniciousness of a standing army.

Fox's stay in France enabled him, through his connections with Talleyrand and Lafayette, to search the French archives for his planned history of the reign of James II, the Glorious Revolution and the reign of William III. Fox left the work unfinished at his death, however, and only covered the first year of James' reign (1685). It was posthumously published in 1808 as A History of the Early Part of the Reign of James II.

Fox confessed in December 1802 that he was "obstinate" in his belief that Napoleon's "wish is Peace, nay that he is afraid of war to the last degree". In March 1803 he believed that Napoleon's belligerence towards Piedmont, Malta and Switzerland was regrettable but did not constitute a casus belli, writing to the Duchess of Devonshire "if I am to shew a feeling for the wounded honour of the country you or somebody must shew me the wound, for the life of me I cannot find as single instance since the definitive treaty where the Govt. of France has behaved ill to us".

When war broke out again in May 1803, Fox blamed the Prime Minister Henry Addington for not standing up to the King. The British government had not left Napoleon "any alternative but War or the most abject humiliation" and that the war "is entirely the fault of our Ministers and not of Bonaparte". Upon hearing of the spectacular French victories at Ulm and Austerlitz later in 1805, Fox commented: "These are wonders indeed but they are not much more than I expected". When Pitt (who had taken over from Addington as premier in 1804) tried to persuade Prussia into an anti-French alliance, Prussia refused, to Fox's delight. He was a close friend and colleague of Samuel Whitbread and supported by Fox, Whitbread in 1805, led the campaign to have Viscount Melville removed from office; Melville resigned. However, The House of Lords found Melville not guilty and he was acquitted of all charges.

=== Final year ===
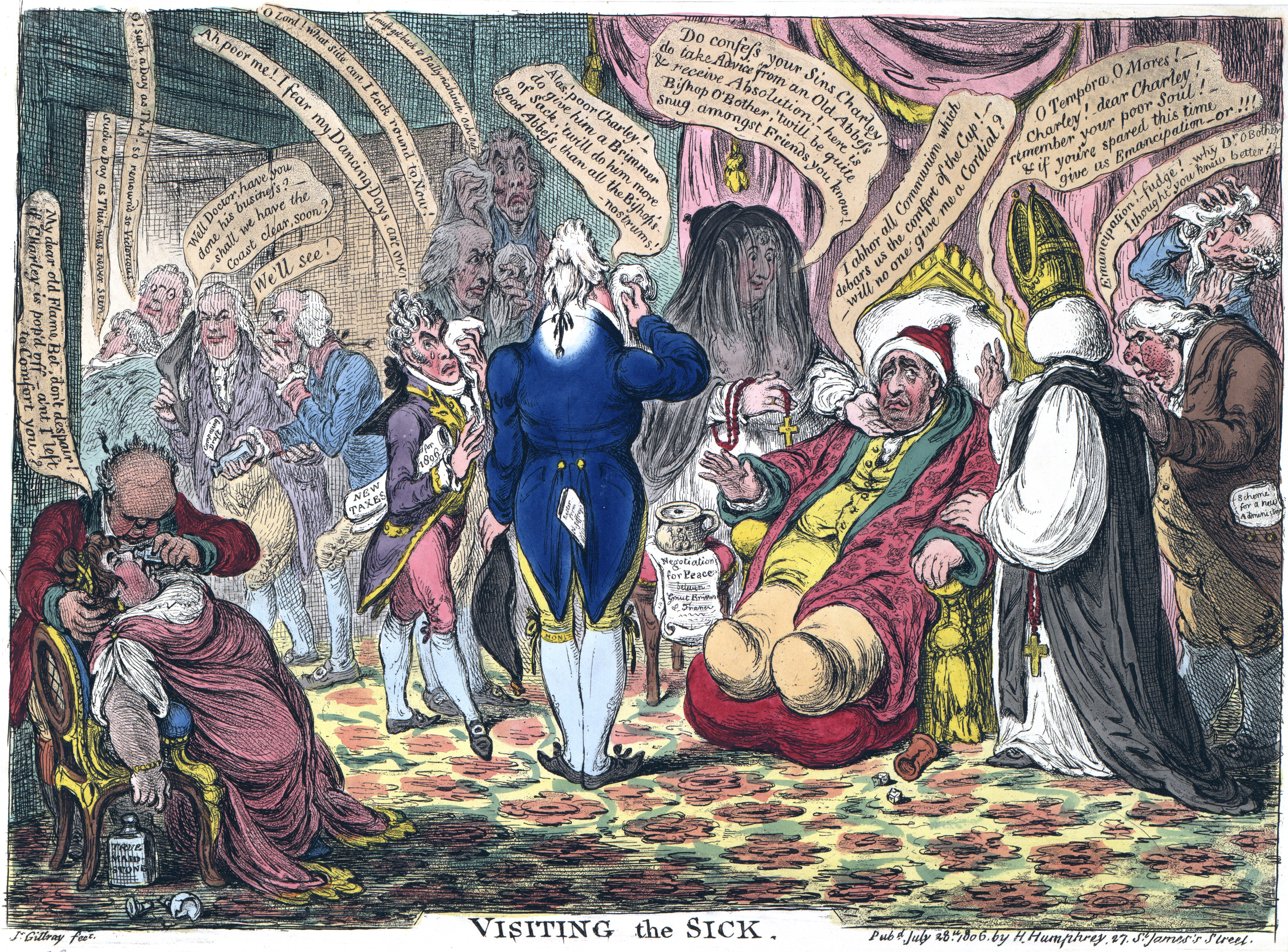
In Visiting the Sick (1806), James Gillray caricatured Fox's last months.

When Pitt died on 23 January 1806, Fox was the last remaining great political figure of the era and could no longer be denied a place in government. When Grenville formed a "Ministry of All the Talents" out of his supporters, the followers of Addington and the Foxites, Fox was once again offered the post of Foreign Secretary, which he accepted in February. Fox was convinced (as he had been since Napoleon's accession) that France desired a lasting peace and that he was "sure that two civil sentences from the Ministers would ensure Peace". Therefore, peace talks were speedily entered into by Fox and his old friend Talleyrand, now French foreign minister. The mood had completely changed by July, however, and Fox was forced to acknowledge that his assessment of Napoleon's pacific intentions was wrong. Negotiations over Hanover, Naples, Sicily, and Malta faltered and Talleyrand vetoed Russian participation in the negotiations. King George believed this was a ploy to divide Britain and Russia as French interests would suffer if she had to deal with an Anglo-Russian alliance. Fox was forced to agree that the King's belief was "but too well founded".

In June, Lord Yarmouth was sent on a peace mission to Paris. Fox wrote to him: "I feel my own Glory highly interested in such an event, but to make peace by acceding to worse terms than those first suggested...wd. be as repugnant to my own feelings as it wd. be to the Duty I owe to K. & Country". Yarmouth confirmed that Russia was negotiating separately with France. Fox was appalled at what he called this "extraordinary step". When Yarmouth reported successive new French demands, Fox replied that the British government "continues ardently to wish for the Conclusion of Peace". In August, Lord Lauderdale was sent to join Yarmouth (with full negotiating powers), and he reported back to Fox of "the complete system of Terror which prevails here". Fox's French friends were too frightened to call on him.

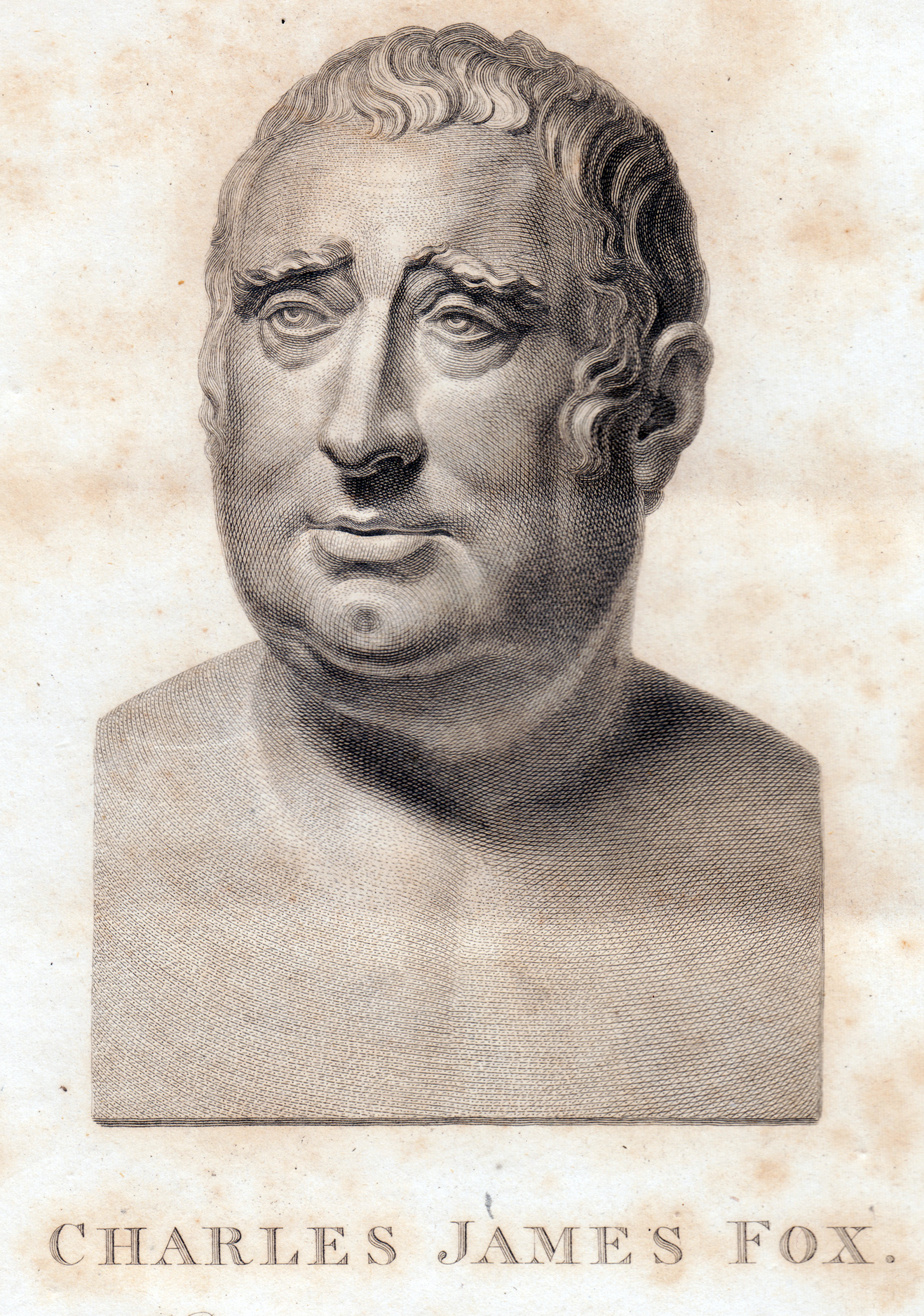
Engraving of Joseph Nollekens' "last bust" of Charles James Fox (1808)

Fox's biographer notes that these failed negotiations were "a stunning experience" for Fox, who had always insisted that France desired peace and that the war was the responsibility of King George and his fellow monarchs: "All of this was being proved false...It was a tragic end to Fox's career". To observers such as John Rickman, "Charley Fox eats his former opinions daily and even ostentatiously showing himself the worse man, but the better minister of a corrupt government", and who further claimed that "He should have died, for his fame, a little sooner; before Pitt".

Though the administration failed to achieve either Catholic emancipation or peace with France, Fox's last great achievement would be the abolition of the slave trade in 1807. Though Fox was to die before abolition was enacted, he oversaw a Foreign Slave Trade Bill in spring 1806 that prohibited British subjects from contributing to the trading of slaves with the colonies of Britain's wartime enemies, thus eliminating two-thirds of the slave trade passing through British ports.

On 10 June 1806, Fox offered a resolution for total abolition to Parliament: "this House, conceiving the African slave trade to be contrary to the principles of justice, humanity, and sound policy, will, with all practicable expedition, proceed to take effectual measures for abolishing the said trade..." The House of Commons voted 114 to 15 in favour and the Lords approved the motion on 24 June. Fox said that:

So fully am I impressed with the vast importance and necessity of attaining what will be the object of my motion this night, that if, during the almost forty years that I have had the honour of a seat in parliament, I had been so fortunate as to accomplish that, and that only, I should think I had done enough, and could retire from public life with comfort, and the conscious satisfaction, that I had done my duty.

=== Death ===
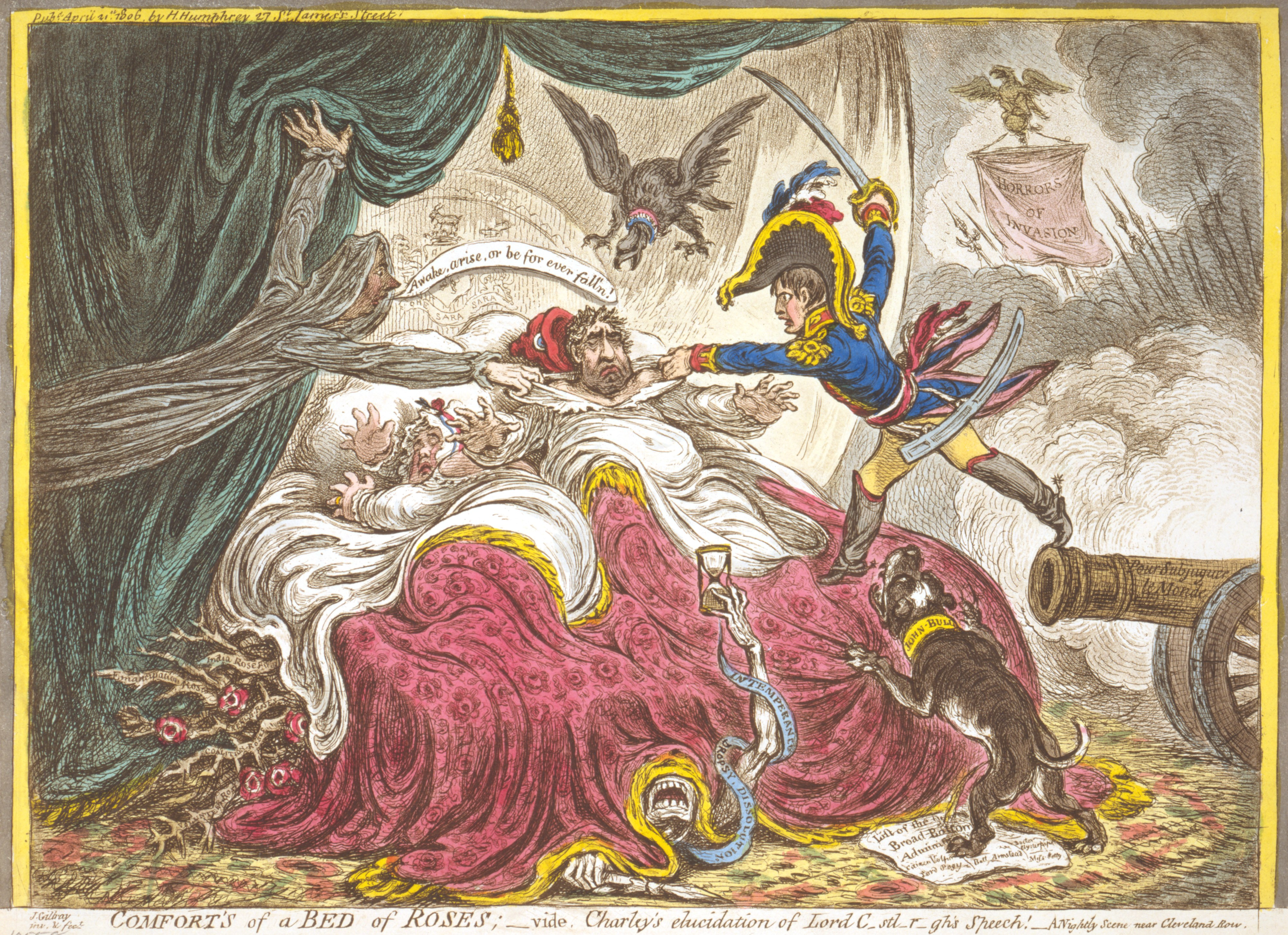
In Comforts of a Bed of Roses (1806), Gillray depicts Death crawling out from under Fox's covers, entwined with a scroll inscribed "Intemperance, Dropsy, Dissolution".

Fox died – still in office – at Chiswick House, west of London, on 13 September 1806, not eight months after the younger Pitt. An autopsy revealed a hardened liver, thirty-five gallstones and around seven pints of transparent fluid in his abdomen. Fox left £10,000-worth of debts, though this was only a quarter of the £40,000 that the charitable public had to raise to pay off Pitt's arrears. Although Fox had wanted to be buried near his home in Chertsey, his funeral took place in Westminster Abbey on 10 October 1806, the anniversary of his initial election for Westminster in 1780. Unlike Pitt's, Fox's funeral was a private affair, but the multitude that turned out to pay their respects were at least as large as those at his rival's service.

== Private life ==
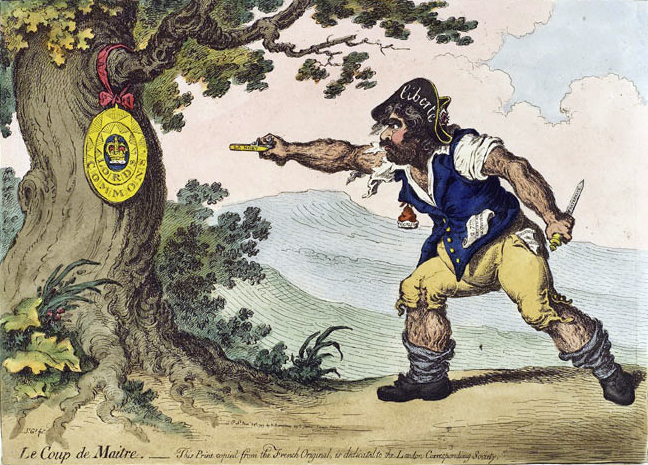
Le Coup de Maitre. – This Print copied from the French Original, is dedicated to the London Corresponding Society (1797): a caricature of Fox by Gillray, showing the Whig as a sans-culotte taking aim at the constitutional target of Crown, Lords and Commons.

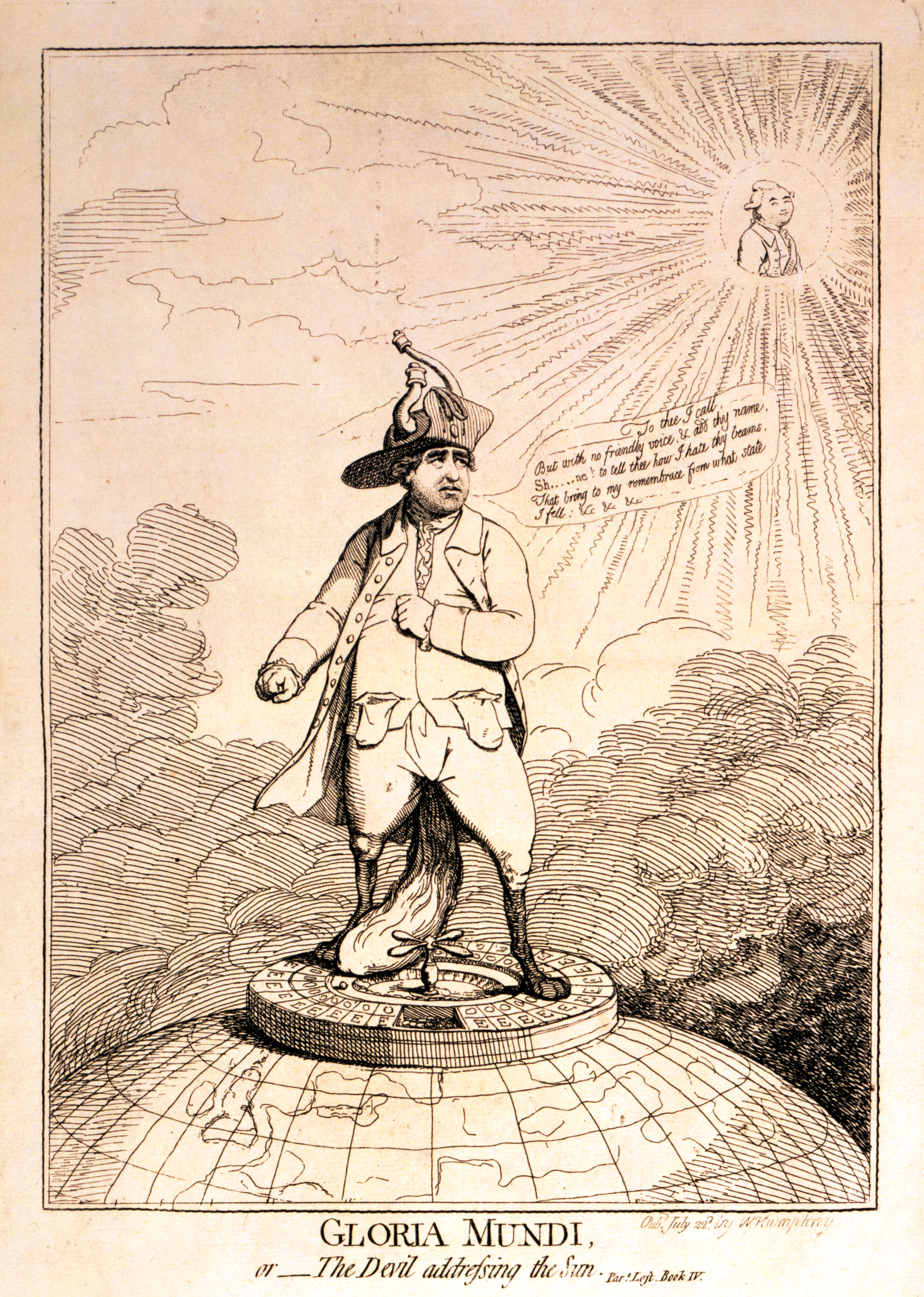
A caricature showing Fox standing on a roulette wheel perched atop a globe showing the British Isles and continental Europe. The implication is that his penniless state, indicated by turned-out pockets, is due to gambling.

Fox's private life (insofar as it was private) was notorious, even in an age noted for the licentiousness of its upper classes. He was famed for his rakishness and his drinking; vices which were both indulged frequently and immoderately. He was also an inveterate gambler, once claiming that winning was the greatest pleasure in the world, and losing the second-greatest. Between 1772 and 1774, his father – shortly before dying – had to pay off £120,000 of Fox's debts; the equivalent of around £16 million in 2025. Fox was twice bankrupted between 1781 and 1784, and at one point his creditors confiscated his furniture. His finances were often "more the subject of conversation than any other topic". By the end of his life, he had lost about £200,000 gambling.

In appearance, Fox was dark, corpulent and hairy, to the extent that when he was born his father compared him to a monkey. His round face was dominated by his luxuriant eyebrows, with the result that he was known among fellow Whigs as 'the Eyebrow'. Though he became increasingly dishevelled and fat in middle age, the young Fox had been very fashionable; he had been the leader of the 'Maccaroni' set of extravagant young followers of continental fashions. Fox liked riding horses and watching and playing cricket, but his impulsive nature and considerable bulk led to his often being run out between wickets.

Fox was frequently ridiculed – most famously by Gillray, for whom he served as a stock Jacobin villain. The King disliked Fox greatly, regarding him as beyond morality and the corrupter of his own eldest son, and the late eighteenth-century movements of Christian evangelism and middle-class 'respectability' also frowned on his excesses. Fox was apparently not greatly bothered by these criticisms and kept a collection of his caricatures, which he found amusing. His friend Frederick Howard, 5th Earl of Carlisle, said of him that since "the respect of the world was not easily retrievable, he became so callous to what was said of him, as never to repress a single thought, or even temper a single expression when he was before the public." Particularly after 1794, Fox rarely consulted the opinions of anyone outside of his own circle of friends and supporters.

Fox was also regarded as a notorious womaniser. In 1784 or 1785, Fox met and fell in love with Elizabeth Armistead, a former courtesan and mistress of the Prince of Wales who had little interest in politics or Parliament. He married her in a private ceremony at Wyton in Huntingdonshire on 28 September 1795, but did not make the fact public until October 1802, and Elizabeth was never really accepted at court. Fox would increasingly spend time away from Parliament at Armistead's rural villa, St. Ann's Hill, near Chertsey in Surrey, where her influence gradually moderated Fox's wilder behaviour, and together they would read, garden, explore the countryside and entertain friends. In his last days, the sceptical Fox allowed scriptural readings at his bedside in order to please his religious wife. She survived him by thirty-six years.

Despite his celebrated flaws, history records Fox as an amiable figure. The Tory wit George Selwyn wrote that "I have passed two evenings with him, and never was anybody so agreeable, and the more so from his having no pretensions to it". Selwyn also said that "Charles, I am persuaded, would have no consideration on earth but for what was useful to his own ends. You have heard me say, that I thought he had no malice or rancour; I think so still and am sure of it. But I think that he has no feeling neither, for anyone but himself; and if I could trace in any one action of his life anything that had not for its object his own gratification, I should with pleasure receive the intelligence because then I had much rather (if it were possible) think well of him than not". Sir Philip Francis said of Fox: "The essential defect in his character and the cause of all his failures, strange as it may seem, was that he had no heart". Edward Gibbon remarked that "Perhaps no human being was ever more perfectly exempt from the taint of malevolence, vanity, or falsehood." Central to understanding Fox's life was his view that "friendship was the only real happiness in the world." For Fox, politics was the extension of his activities at Newmarket and Brooks's to Westminster. "Fox had little or no interest in the exercise of power." The details of policy – particularly of economics – bored him, in contrast with the intensity of Burke's legal pursuit of Warren Hastings, and of Pitt's prosecution of the war against France. Moreover, the Foxites were "the witty and wicked" satellites of their leader, as much friends as political allies.

In a letter published in The Daily Telegraph in 2020, Lord Lexden compared him to Prime Minister Boris Johnson, saying that "Johnson is an 18th Century figure in many ways" and that the two leaders may be commended in similar ways.

== Legacy ==
In the 19th century, liberals portrayed Fox as their hero, praising his courage, perseverance and eloquence. They celebrated his opposition to war in alliance with European despots against the people of France eager for their freedom, and they praised his fight for liberties at home. The liberals saluted his fights for parliamentary reform, Catholic Emancipation, intellectual freedom, and justice for the Dissenters. They were especially pleased with his fight for the abolition of the slave trade. More recent historians put Fox in the context of the 18th century, and emphasize the brilliance of his battles with Pitt. A statue of Fox stands, alongside other notable Parliamentarians, in St Stephen's Hall in the Palace of Westminster.

While not wholly forgotten today Fox is no longer the famous hero he had been, and is less well remembered than Pitt. After 1794, the word 'Whig' gave way to the word "Foxite" as the self-description of the members of the opposition to Pitt. In many ways, the Pittite-Foxite division of Parliament after the French Revolution established the basis for the ideological Conservative-Liberal divide of the nineteenth century. Fox and Pitt went down in parliamentary history as legendary political and oratorical opponents who would not be equalled until the days of Gladstone and Disraeli more than half a century later. Even Fox's great rival was willing to acknowledge the old Whig's talents. When, in 1790, the comte de Mirabeau disparaged Fox in Pitt's presence, Pitt stopped him, saying, "You have never seen the wizard within the magic circle."

The Fox Club was established in London in 1790 and held the first of its Fox dinners – annual events celebrating Fox's birthday – in 1808; the last recorded dinner took place at Brooks's in 1907. As Charles Grey, 2nd Earl Grey asked a Newcastle-upon-Tyne Fox dinner in 1819: "What subject is there, whether of foreign or domestic interest, or that in the smallest degree affects our Constitution which does not immediately associate itself with the memory of Mr Fox?" Fox's name was invoked numerous times in debates by supporters of Catholic Emancipation and the Great Reform Act in the early nineteenth century. John Russell, 6th Duke of Bedford kept a bust of Fox in his pantheon of Whig grandees at Woburn Abbey and erected a statue of him in Bloomsbury Square. Sarah Siddons kept a portrait of Fox in her dressing room. In 1811, the Prince of Wales took the oaths of office as regent with a bust of Fox at his side. Whig households would collect locks of Fox's hair, books of his conflated speeches and busts in his likeness.

The town of Foxborough, Massachusetts, was named in honour of the staunch supporter of American independence. Fox is remembered in his home town of Chertsey by a bust on a high plinth (pictured left), erected in 2006 in a new development by the railway station. Fox is also commemorated in a termly dinner held in his honour at his alma mater, Hertford College, Oxford, by students of English, history and the romance languages.

A statue of Fox by Edward Hodges Baily was erected in Westminster Hall in 1857.

Fox was the subject of the epigraph in John F. Kennedy's Pulitzer-prize winning book Profiles in Courage: "He well knows what snares are spread about his path, from personal animosity…and possibly from popular delusion. But he has put to hazard his ease, his security, his interest, his power, even his…popularity. …He is traduced and abused for his supposed motives. He will remember that obloquy is a necessary ingredient in the composition of all true glory: he will remember…that calumny and abuse are essential parts of triumph. …He may live long, he may do much. But here is the summit. He never can exceed what he does this day." — Edmund Burke's eulogy of Charles James Fox for his attack upon the tyranny of the East India Company. House of Commons, 1 December 1783

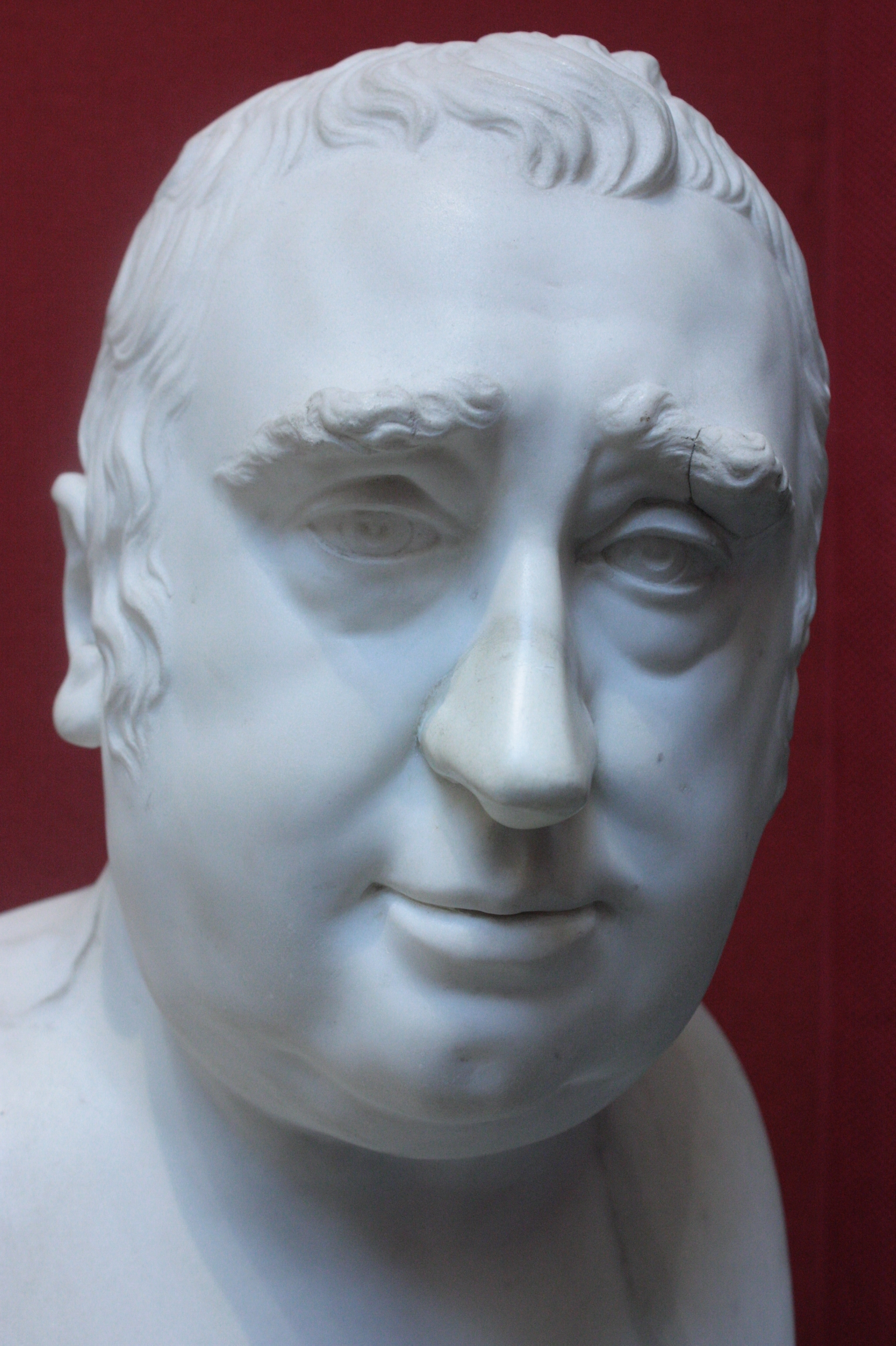
Charles James Fox, c.1802, National Gallery of Scotland

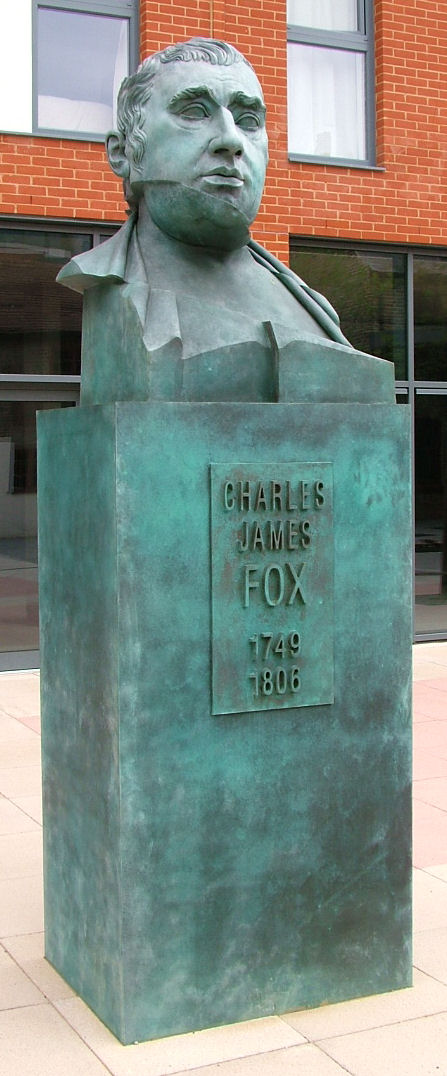
Bust of Fox in Chertsey, erected in 2005

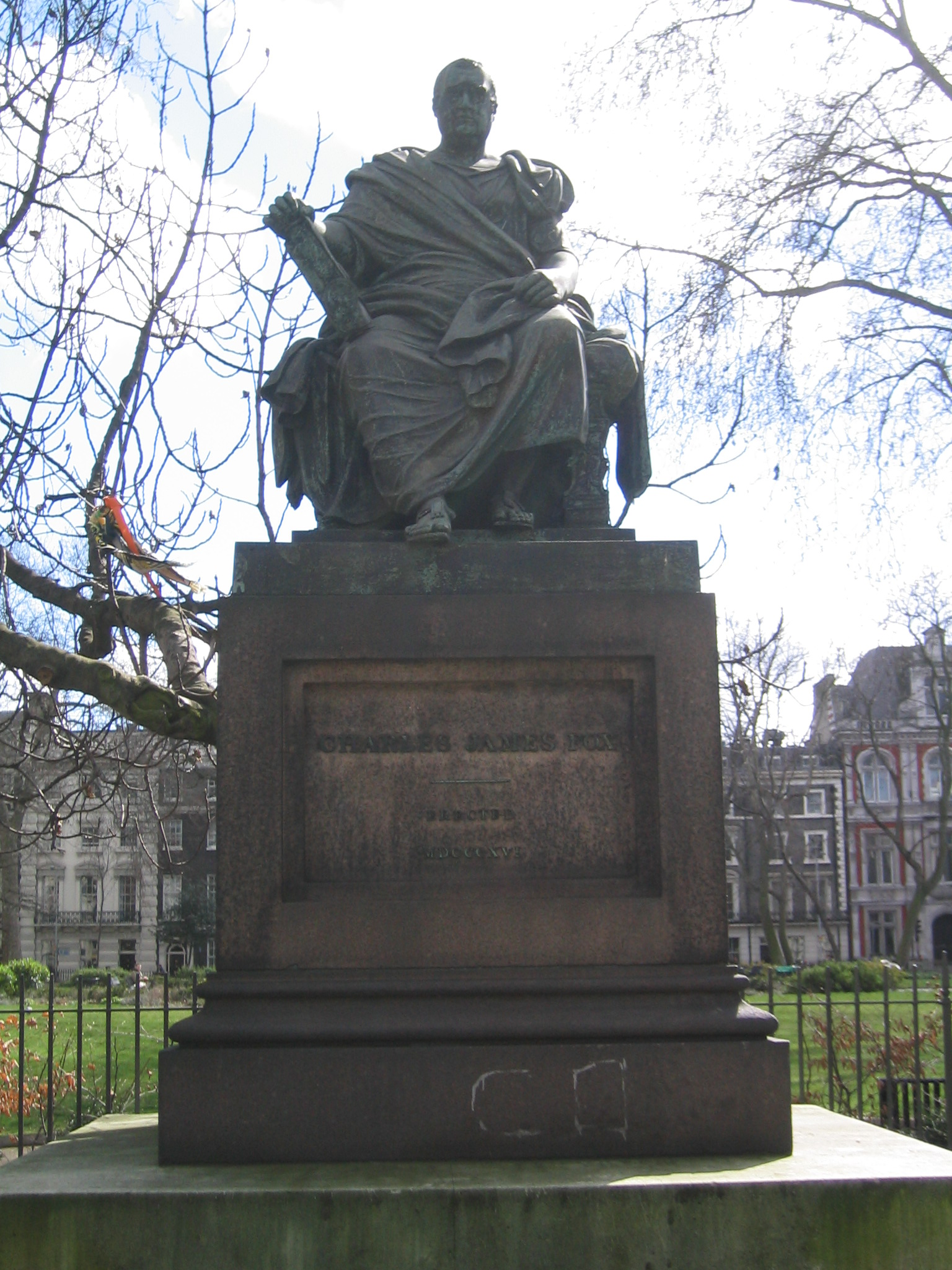
Statue of Charles James Fox in Bloomsbury Square, London

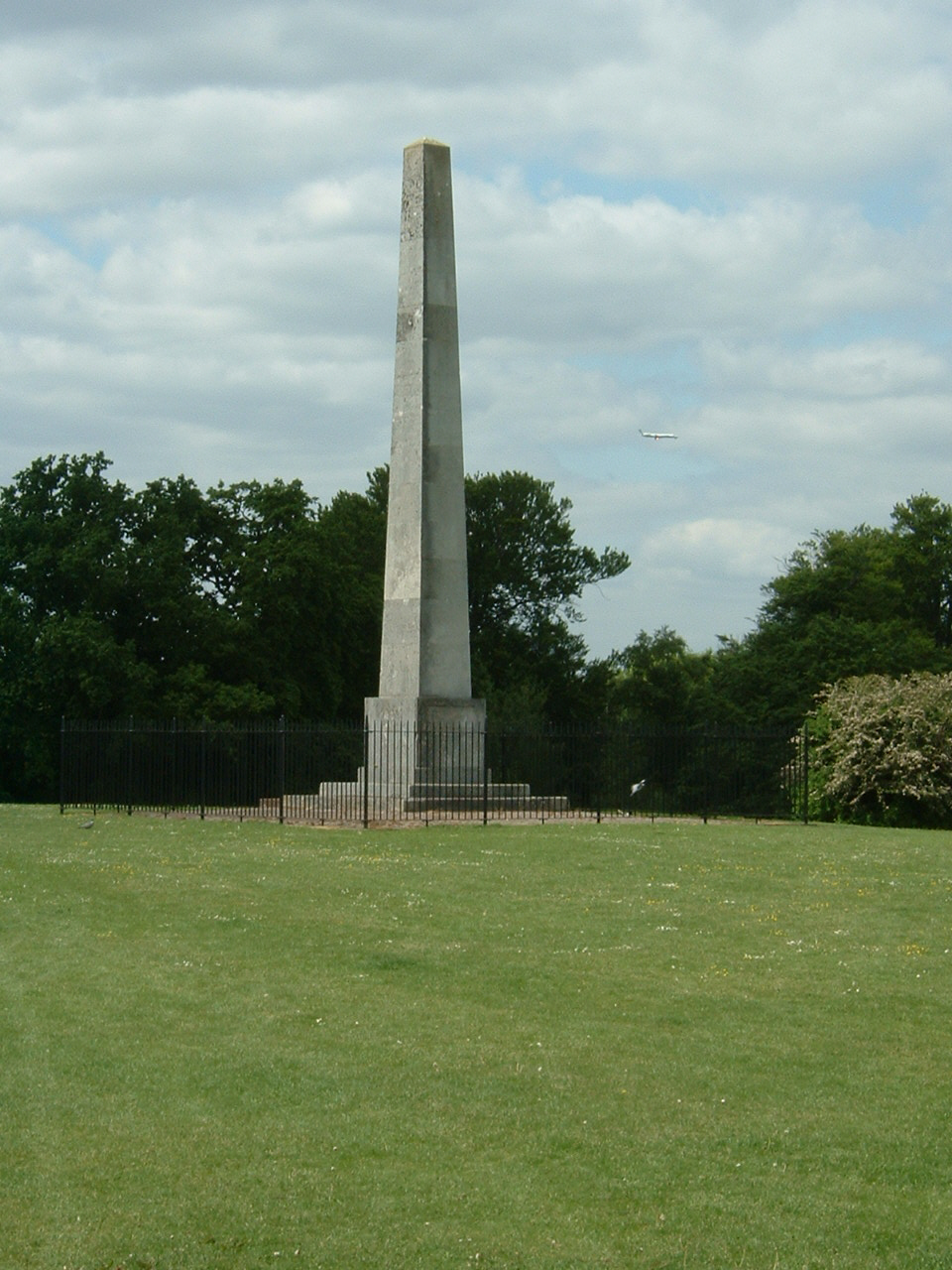
Memorial to Fox erected by William Chamberlayne on his estate at Weston, now within Mayfield Park, Southampton.

Fox has been portrayed on screen by many actors:

- Robert Morley in the 1942 film The Young Mr. Pitt
- Leslie Banks in the 1947 film Mrs. Fitzherbert
- Peter Bull in the 1954 film Beau Brummell
- Ronald Lacey in the 1975 television series The Fight Against Slavery
- Keith Barron in the 1979 television series Prince Regent
- Jim Carter in the 1994 film The Madness of King George
- Hugh Sachs in the 1999 television miniseries Aristocrats
- Michael Gambon in the 2006 film Amazing Grace
- Simon McBurney in the 2008 film The Duchess
- Blake Ritson in a 2011 episode of the television series Garrow's Law

Parliament of Great Britain
Preceded by Bamber Gascoyne; John Burgoyne	Member of Parliament for Midhurst; 1768–1774; With: Lord Stavordale	Succeeded by Herbert Mackworth; Clement Tudway
Preceded by Earl of Donegall; Hon. Thomas Howard	Member of Parliament for Malmesbury; 1774–1780; With: William Strahan	Succeeded by Viscount Lewisham; Viscount Fairford
Preceded by Lord Thomas Pelham-Clinton; Viscount Malden	Member of Parliament for Westminster; 1780–1801; With: Sir George Rodney, Bt 1780–1782; Sir Cecil Wray, Bt 1782–1784; Samuel Hood 1784–1788, 1790–1796; Lord John Townshend 1788–1790; Sir Alan Gardner, Bt 1796–1801	Succeeded by Parliament of the United Kingdom
Preceded by Charles Ross	Member of Parliament for Tain Burghs; 1784–1786	Succeeded by George Ross
Parliament of the United Kingdom
Preceded by Parliament of Great Britain	Member of Parliament for Westminster; 1801–1806; With: Sir Alan Gardner, Bt	Succeeded by Sir Alan Gardner, Bt; Earl Percy
Political offices
New post	Foreign Secretary; 1782	Succeeded by The Lord Grantham
Preceded by Lord North	Leader of the House of Commons; 1782	Succeeded by Thomas Townshend
Preceded by The Lord Grantham	Foreign Secretary; 1783	Succeeded by The Earl Temple
Preceded by Thomas Townshend	Leader of the House of Commons; 1783; With: Lord North	Succeeded by William Pitt
Preceded by The Lord Mulgrave	Foreign Secretary; 1806	Succeeded by Viscount Howick
Preceded by William Pitt	Leader of the House of Commons; 1806	Succeeded by Viscount Howick
