= Earl of Ilchester =

Earldom in the Peerage of Great Britain

Earldom of Ilchester
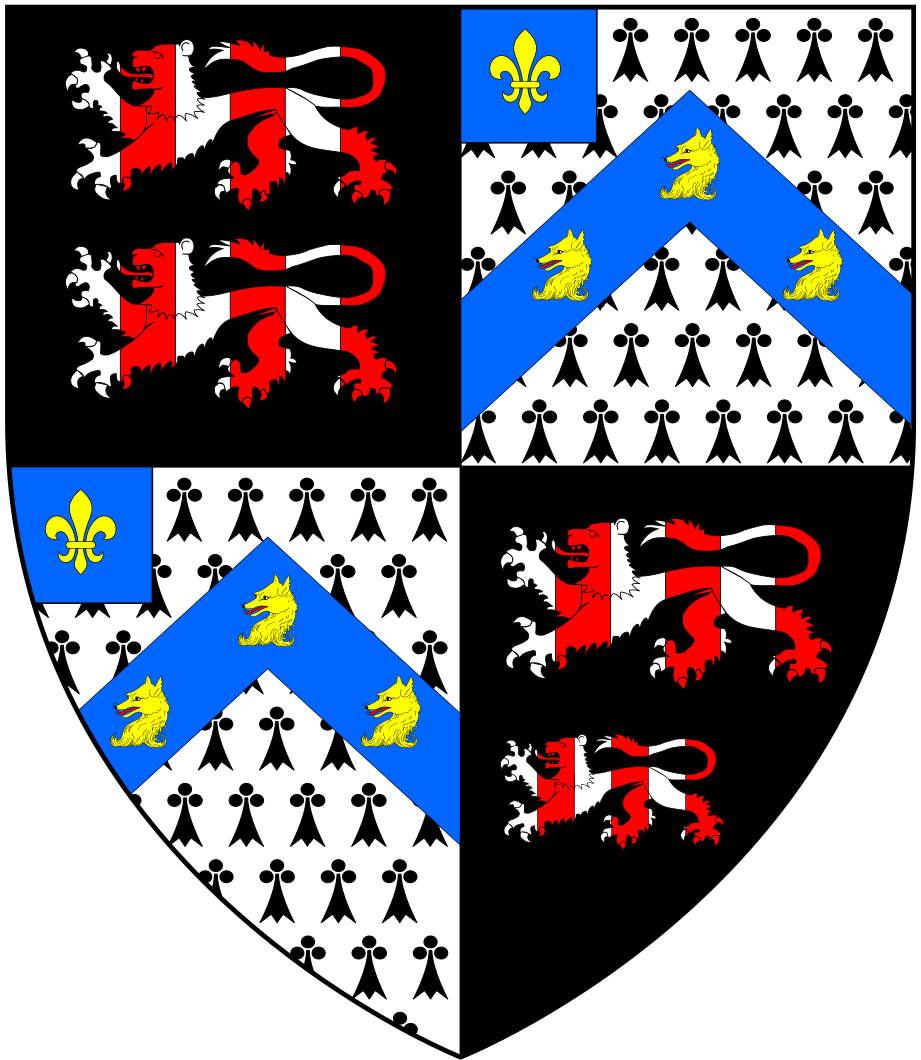
- Arms of Fox-Strangways: Quarterly of four: 1st & 4th: Sable, two lions passant paly of six argent and gules (Strangways); 2nd & 3rd: Ermine, on a chevron azure three fox's heads and necks erased or on a canton of the second a fleur-de-lys of the third (Fox).
- Creation date: 1756
- Created by: George II
- Peerage: Peerage of Great Britain
- First holder: Stephen Fox-Strangways, 1st Earl of Ilchester
- Present holder: Robin Maurice Fox-Strangways, 10th Earl of Ilchester
- Heir presumptive: Paul Andre Fox-Strangeways
- Subsidiary titles: Baron Ilchester; Baron Ilchester and Stavordale
- Former seats: Melbury House; Holland House

Earl of Ilchester is a title in the Peerage of Great Britain. It was created in 1756 for Stephen Fox, 1st Baron Ilchester, who had previously represented Shaftesbury in Parliament. He had already been created Baron Ilchester, of Ilchester in the County of Somerset in 1741, and Baron Ilchester and Stavordale, of Redlynch, in the County of Somerset, in 1747. These titles were also in the Peerage of Great Britain. All three peerages were created with remainder, failing heirs male of his own, to his younger brother Henry Fox, who was himself created Baron Holland in 1763. The brothers were the only sons from the second marriage of the politician Sir Stephen Fox.

In 1758 the first Earl assumed by Royal licence the additional surname of Strangways, which was the maiden name of his wife's maternal grandmother. He was succeeded by his eldest son, the second Earl. He represented Midhurst in Parliament. His eldest son, the third Earl, served as Captain of the Yeomen of the Guard from 1835 to 1841 in the Whig administration of Lord Melbourne and was also Lord Lieutenant of Somerset from 1837 to 1839. Lord Ilchester survived both his sons and was succeeded by his half-brother, the fourth Earl. He was Ambassador to the German Confederation from 1840 to 1849. His nephew, the fifth Earl, was Captain of the Honourable Corps of Gentlemen-at-Arms from 1873 to 1874 in the Liberal government of William Ewart Gladstone and also served as Lord Lieutenant of Dorset from 1885 to 1905. On the death in 1964 of his grandson, the seventh Earl, the line of the eldest son of the first Earl failed. The seventh Earl was succeeded by his fourth cousin, the eighth Earl. As of 2014 the titles are held by his grandson, the tenth Earl, who succeeded his uncle in 2006.

The family seat was Melbury House, near Evershot, Dorset. The family, through Ilchester Estates, owns and manages large portions of land in the county of Dorset and the Holland House estate west of Holland Park in Kensington, London. The family inherited much land in the 17th century from the Wadham family of Merryfield, Ilton in Somerset and of Edge, Branscombe in Devon, and in 1874 from their distant cousins the Fox family of Holland House, Kensington.

== Earls of Ilchester (1756) ==
- Stephen Fox-Strangways, 1st Earl of Ilchester (1704–1776)
- Henry Thomas Fox-Strangways, 2nd Earl of Ilchester (1747–1802)
- Henry Stephen Fox-Strangways, 3rd Earl of Ilchester (1787–1858)
- William Thomas Horner Fox-Strangways, 4th Earl of Ilchester (1795–1865)
- Henry Edward Fox-Strangways, 5th Earl of Ilchester (1847–1905)
- Giles Stephen Holland Fox-Strangways, 6th Earl of Ilchester (1874–1959)
- Edward Henry Charles James Fox-Strangways, 7th Earl of Ilchester (1905–1964)
- Walter Angelo Fox-Strangways, 8th Earl of Ilchester (1887–1970)
- Maurice Vivian de Touffreville Fox-Strangways, 9th Earl of Ilchester (1920–2006)
- Robin Maurice Fox-Strangways, 10th Earl of Ilchester (b. 1942)

== Family tree ==
Family tree of the Fox family

Elizabeth Whittle d. 1696	Stephen Fox; 1627–1716	Christiana Hope	Thomas Strangways; 1643–1713
Charles Cornwallis; 1655–1698; Baron Cornwallis	Elizabeth Fox c. 1655–1681	Jane Fox d. 1721	George Compton; 1664–1727; Earl of Northampton	Susannah Strangways	Thomas Strangways Horner (né Horner); 1688–1741
Baron Holland of Holland in the County of Lincoln, 1762	Baron Holland of Foxley in the County of Wiltshire, 1763	Baron Ilchester, 1741; Baron Ilchester and Stavordale, 1747; Earl of Ilchester, 1756
Caroline Lennox; 1723–1774; 1st Baroness Holland of Holland	Henry Fox; 1705–1774; 1st Baron Holland of Foxley	Stephen Fox-Strangways (né Horner); 1704–1776; 1st Earl of Ilchester, etc.	Elizabeth Horner c. 1723–1792
Mary FitzPatrick d. 1778	Stephen Fox; 1747–1774; 2nd Baron Holland of Holland, and of Foxley	Charles James Fox; 1749–1806 (m. Elizabeth Armistead)	Mary Fox-Strangways O'Grady d. 1790	Henry Fox-Strangways; 1747–1802; 2nd Earl of Ilchester, etc.	Maria Digby d. 1842	Harriet Fox-Strangways; 1749/50–1815 (m. John Dyke Acland)	Jane Haines d. 1830	Charles Fox-Strangways; 1761–1836
Elizabeth Vassall; 1771–1845	Henry Richard Vassall-Fox; 1773–1840; 3rd Baron Holland of Holland, and of Foxley	Henry Fox-Strangways (né Fox); 1787–1858; 3rd Earl of Ilchester, etc.
Charles Richard Fox; 1796–1873 (m. Mary FitzClarence)	Henry Fox; 1802–1859; 4th Baron Holland of Holland, and of Foxley (m. Mary Coventry)	Mary Elizabeth Fox; 1806–1891 (m. Thomas Powys; Baron Lilford)	William Fox-Strangways; 1795–1865; 4th Earl of Ilchester, etc.	John Fox-Strangways; 1803–1859	Amelia Marjoribanks d. 1886	Rev. Henry Fox-Strangways; 1793–1860	Hester Eleanora Buller d. 1865
Barony Holland of Holland and Barony Holland of Foxley extinct, 1859
Henry Fox-Strangways; 1847–1905; 5th Earl of Ilchester, etc.	Mary Dawson; 1852–1935	Col. Walter Fox-Strangways; 1832–1885	Harriet Buller d. 1903
Giles Fox-Strangways; 1874–1959; 6th Earl of Ilchester, etc.	Lady Helen Vane-Tempest-Stewart; 1876–1956	Maurice Fox-Strangways; 1862–1938	Louisa Phillips d. 1940
Henry Fox-Strangways, 7th Earl of Ilchester, etc. 1905–1964	Helen Ward; 1907–1970	Walter Fox-Strangways; 1887–1970; 8th Earl of Ilchester, etc.	Laure Mazaraki d. 1970
Maurice Fox-Strangways; 1920–2006; 9th Earl of Ilchester, etc.	Raymond Fox-Strangways, 1921–2005
Robin Maurice Fox-Strangways b. 1942; 10th Earl of Ilchester, etc.	Paul Andre Fox-Strangways b. 1950; Heir presumptive to the Earldom of Ilchester

== Present peer ==
Robin Maurice Fox-Strangways, 10th Earl of Ilchester (born 2 September 1942) is the son of Raymond George Fox-Strangways, younger son of the 8th Earl, and his wife Margaret Vera Force. He was educated at Loughborough College and had a career with Lloyds Bank. In 2003 he was living at Frankton, Warwickshire. On 2 July 2006 he succeeded to the peerages.

On 19 July 1969, he married Margaret Elizabeth Miles, daughter of Geoffrey Miles, and they had two children:

- Simon James Fox-Strangways, Lord Stavordale (1972–2018)
- Lady Charlotte Helen Fox-Strangways (born 1974), who had a career in nursing and married Stephen Hobin

The heir presumptive (and last in line to the earldom) is the present peer's younger brother Paul Andre Fox-Strangways (born 1950), a university lecturer.

== See also ==
- Baron Holland
- Charles James Fox
