= Fox family (English aristocracy) =

Noble family of England

The Fox family is a noble family of England that held the title of Baron Holland from 7 March 1762 when it was created for Lady Caroline Fox until 18 December 1859 upon the death of Henry Fox, who died without living issue leading to the title becoming extinct. The family has held the title of Earl of Ilchester since its creation for Stephen Fox in 1756.

Princess Marie of Liechtenstein, the adopted daughter of the last Baron Holland, was a member of the family.

== Family tree ==
Family tree of the Fox family

Elizabeth Whittle d. 1696	Stephen Fox; 1627–1716	Christiana Hope
Charles Cornwallis; 1655–1698; 3rd Baron Cornwallis	Elizabeth Fox c. 1655–1681	Jane Fox d. 1721	George Compton; 1664–1727; 4th Earl of Northampton	Susannah Strangways	Thomas Strangways-Horner (né Horner)
Baron Holland of Holland in the County of Lincoln, 1762	Baron Holland of Foxley in the County of Wiltshire, 1763	Baron Ilchester, 1741; Baron Ilchester and Stavordale, 1747; Earl of Ilchester, 1756
Caroline (Lennox) Fox; 1723–1774; 1st Baroness Holland of Holland	Henry Fox; 1705–1774; 1st Baron Holland of Foxley	Stephen Fox-Strangways (né) Fox; 1704–1776; 1st Earl of Ilchester	Elizabeth Fox-Strangways (née Horner)
Mary FitzPatrick d. 1778	Stephen Fox; 1747–1774; 2nd Baron Holland of Holland, 2nd Baron Holland of Foxley	Charles James Fox; 1749–1806	Elizabeth Fox (née Armistead); 1750–1842	Mary Fox-Strangways (née O'Grady) d. 1790	Henry Fox-Strangways; 1747–1802; 2nd Earl of Ilchester	Maria Fox-Strangways (née Digby) d. 1842	Harriet Acland (née Fox-Strangways); 1749/50–1815	John Dyke Acland; 1746–1778	Rev. Hon. Charles Fox-Strangways; 1761–1836	Jane Haines d. 1830
Elizabeth Fox (née Vassall); 1771–1845	Henry Richard Vassall-Fox (né Fox); 1773–1840; 3rd Baron Holland of Holland, 3rd Baron Holland of Foxley	Henry Fox-Strangways; 1787–1858; 3rd Earl of Ilchester
Charles Richard Fox; 1796–1873	Lady Mary Fox (née FitzClarence); 1798–1864	Henry Fox; 1802–1859; 4th Baron Holland of Holland, 3rd Baron Holland of Foxley	Lady Mary Coventry; 1812–1889	Mary Elizabeth Fox; 1806–1891	Thomas Powys; 1801–1861; 3rd Baron Lilford	William Fox-Strangways; 1795–1865; 4th Earl of Ilchester	John Fox-Strangways; 1803–1859	Amelia Fox-Strangways (née Marjoribanks) d. 1886	Rev. Henry Fox-Strangways; 1793–1860	Hester Eleanora Buller d. 1865
Barony Holland of Holland and Barony Holland of Foxley extinct, 1859
Henry Fox-Strangways; 1847–1905; 5th Earl of Ilchester	Mary Fox-Strangways (née Dawson); 1852–1935	Col. Walter Fox-Strangways; 1832–1885	Harriet Fox-Strangways (née Buller) d. 1903
Giles Fox-Strangways; 1874–1959; 6th Earl of Ilchester	Lady Helen Fox-Strangways (née Vane-Tempest-Stewart); 1876–1956	Maurice Fox-Strangways; 1862–1938	Louisa Fox-Strangways (née Phillips) d. 1940
Henry Fox-Strangways, 7th Earl of Ilchester; 1905–1964	Helen Fox-Strangways (née Ward); 1907–1970	Walter Fox-Strangways; 1887–1970; 8th Earl of Ilchester	Laure Fox-Strangways (née Mazaraki) d. 1970
Maurice Fox-Strangways; 1920–2006; 9th Earl of Ilchester	Raymond Fox-Strangways, 1921–2005
Robin Maurice Fox-Strangways b. 1942; 10th Earl of Ilchester	Paul Andre Fox-Strangways b. 1950; Heir presumptive to the Earldom of Ilchester
