= Baron Holland =

Barony in the Peerage of Great Britain

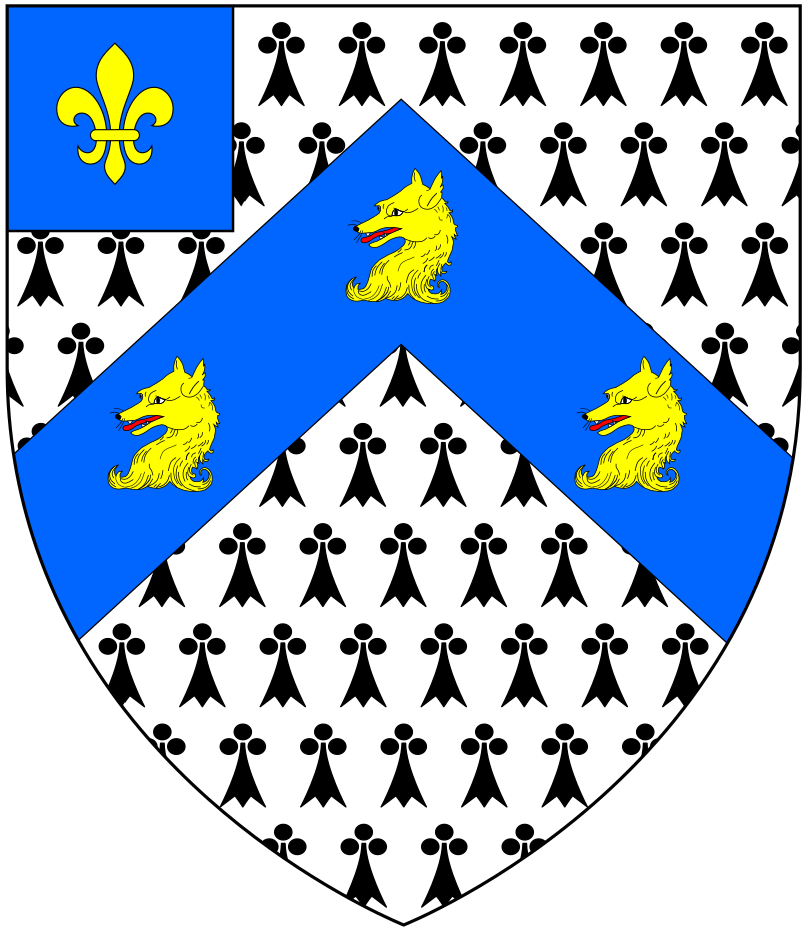
Canting arms of Fox, Baron Holland: Ermine, on a chevron azure three fox's heads and necks erased or on a canton of the second a fleur-de-lys of the third

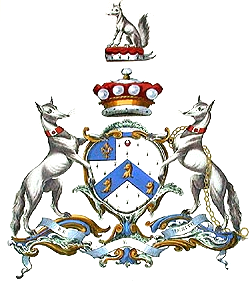
Heraldic achievement of Fox, Baron Holland

Baron Holland, of Holland in the County of Lincoln, and Baron Holland of Foxley, of Foxley in the County of Wiltshire, were two titles in the Peerage of Great Britain. The first barony was created on 7 March 1762 for Lady Caroline Fox, the daughter of Charles Lennox, 2nd Duke of Richmond and the eldest of the famous Lennox sisters. The second barony was created on 17 April 1763 for her husband, the prominent Whig politician Henry Fox. Lord and Lady Holland were both succeeded by their eldest son, the second Baron. He had previously represented Salisbury in Parliament. On his early death in 1774 the titles passed to his only son, the third Baron. He was also an influential Whig politician and notably served as Lord Privy Seal from 1806 to 1807 in the Ministry of All the Talents. He was succeeded by his eldest legitimate son, the fourth Baron. He sat as Member of Parliament for Horsham. He had four daughters but no sons and on his death in 1859 the titles became extinct.

The politician Charles James Fox was the second son of the first Baron and Baroness. The first Baron Holland of Foxley was the second and youngest son from the second marriage of the politician Sir Stephen Fox, and the younger brother of Stephen Fox-Strangways, 1st Earl of Ilchester, whose title was created with remainder to Henry Fox failing any heirs male of his body. Charles Richard Fox was the illegitimate son of the third Baron by his mistress and future wife, Lady Webster.

== Barons Holland, of Holland (1762) ==
- Georgiana Caroline Fox, 1st Baroness Holland (1723–1774)
- Stephen Fox, 2nd Baron Holland (1747–1774)
- Henry Richard Vassall-Fox, 3rd Baron Holland (1773–1840)
- Henry Edward Fox, 4th Baron Holland (1802–1859)

== Barons Holland, of Foxley (1763) ==
- Henry Fox, 1st Baron Holland (1705–1774)
- Stephen Fox, 2nd Baron Holland (1747–1774)
- Henry Richard Vassall-Fox, 3rd Baron Holland (1773–1840)
- Henry Edward Fox, 4th Baron Holland (1802–1859)

== Family tree ==
Family tree of the Fox family

Elizabeth Whittle d. 1696	Stephen Fox; 1627–1716	Christiana Hope
Charles Cornwallis; 1655–1698; 3rd Baron Cornwallis	Elizabeth Fox c. 1655–1681	Jane Fox d. 1721	George Compton; 1664–1727; 4th Earl of Northampton	Susannah Strangways	Thomas Strangways-Horner (né Horner)
Baron Holland of Holland in the County of Lincoln, 1762	Baron Holland of Foxley in the County of Wiltshire, 1763	Baron Ilchester, 1741; Baron Ilchester and Stavordale, 1747; Earl of Ilchester, 1756
Caroline (Lennox) Fox; 1723–1774; 1st Baroness Holland of Holland	Henry Fox; 1705–1774; 1st Baron Holland of Foxley	Stephen Fox-Strangways (né) Fox; 1704–1776; 1st Earl of Ilchester	Elizabeth Fox-Strangways (née Horner)
Mary FitzPatrick d. 1778	Stephen Fox; 1747–1774; 2nd Baron Holland of Holland, 2nd Baron Holland of Foxley	Charles James Fox; 1749–1806	Elizabeth Fox (née Armistead); 1750–1842	Mary Fox-Strangways (née O'Grady) d. 1790	Henry Fox-Strangways; 1747–1802; 2nd Earl of Ilchester	Maria Fox-Strangways (née Digby) d. 1842	Harriet Acland (née Fox-Strangways); 1749/50–1815	John Dyke Acland; 1746–1778	Rev. Hon. Charles Fox-Strangways; 1761–1836	Jane Haines d. 1830
Elizabeth Fox (née Vassall); 1771–1845	Henry Richard Vassall-Fox (né Fox); 1773–1840; 3rd Baron Holland of Holland, 3rd Baron Holland of Foxley	Henry Fox-Strangways; 1787–1858; 3rd Earl of Ilchester
Charles Richard Fox; 1796–1873	Lady Mary Fox (née FitzClarence); 1798–1864	Henry Fox; 1802–1859; 4th Baron Holland of Holland, 3rd Baron Holland of Foxley	Lady Mary Coventry; 1812–1889	Mary Elizabeth Fox; 1806–1891	Thomas Powys; 1801–1861; 3rd Baron Lilford	William Fox-Strangways; 1795–1865; 4th Earl of Ilchester	John Fox-Strangways; 1803–1859	Amelia Fox-Strangways (née Marjoribanks) d. 1886	Rev. Henry Fox-Strangways; 1793–1860	Hester Eleanora Buller d. 1865
Barony Holland of Holland and Barony Holland of Foxley extinct, 1859
Henry Fox-Strangways; 1847–1905; 5th Earl of Ilchester	Mary Fox-Strangways (née Dawson); 1852–1935	Col. Walter Fox-Strangways; 1832–1885	Harriet Fox-Strangways (née Buller) d. 1903
Giles Fox-Strangways; 1874–1959; 6th Earl of Ilchester	Lady Helen Fox-Strangways (née Vane-Tempest-Stewart); 1876–1956	Maurice Fox-Strangways; 1862–1938	Louisa Fox-Strangways (née Phillips) d. 1940
Henry Fox-Strangways, 7th Earl of Ilchester; 1905–1964	Helen Fox-Strangways (née Ward); 1907–1970	Walter Fox-Strangways; 1887–1970; 8th Earl of Ilchester	Laure Fox-Strangways (née Mazaraki) d. 1970
Maurice Fox-Strangways; 1920–2006; 9th Earl of Ilchester	Raymond Fox-Strangways, 1921–2005
Robin Maurice Fox-Strangways b. 1942; 10th Earl of Ilchester	Paul Andre Fox-Strangways b. 1950; Heir presumptive to the Earldom of Ilchester

== See also ==
- Baron Holand
- Earl of Holland
- Earl of Ilchester
- Duke of Richmond
