= Walter Fox-Strangways, 8th Earl of Ilchester =

British peer

Walter Angelo Fox-Strangways, 8th Earl of Ilchester GBE DL 24 September 1887 – 4 October 1970), was a British peer. He also held the subsidiary titles of Baron Ilchester, Baron Strangways and Baron Ilchester and Stavordale. Fox-Strangways inherited the earldom of Ilchester from Edward Henry Charles James Fox-Strangways, 7th Earl of Ilchester, his fifth cousin once removed, after the 7th Earl died without surviving male issue.

== Biography ==
He was the son of Maurice Walter Fox-Strangways CSI (1862–; d. 27 May 1938) and his wife Louisa Blanche Phillips, daughter of Major-General George Phillips. He was educated at Charterhouse School and Pembroke College, Cambridge. He succeeded to the earldom in 1964.

== Marriage and family ==
On 8 April 1916, Fox-Strangways married Laure Georgine Emilie Mazaraki, daughter of Evanghelos Georgios Mazaraki, an executive with the Suez Canal Company; they had three children:

- Group Captain Maurice Vivian de Touffreville Fox-Strangways, 9th Earl of Ilchester (1 April 1920 - 2 July 2006)
- The Honourable Raymond George Fox-Strangways (11 November 1921 - 27 April 2005), father of Robin Maurice Fox-Strangways, 10th Earl of Ilchester.
- Lady Elizabeth Doreen Jeanne Fox-Strangways (21 January 1931 - 18 September 2008)

The 8th Earl died on 4 October 1970 aged 83 and was succeeded in the earldom by his elder son Maurice.

== Arms ==
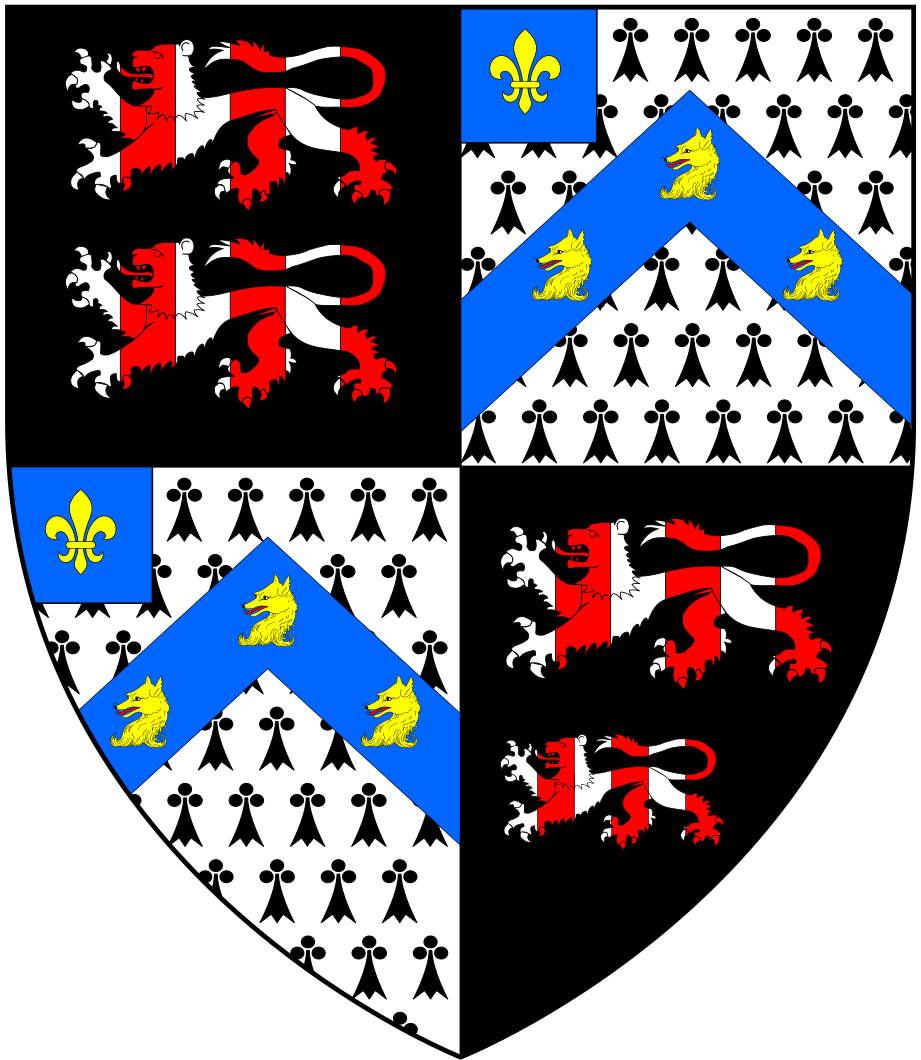
Arms of Fox-Strangways

The arms of the head of the Fox-Strangways family are blazoned Quarterly of four: 1st & 4th: Sable, two lions passant paly of six argent and gules (Strangways); 2nd & 3rd: Ermine, on a chevron azure three foxes' heads and necks erased or on a canton of the second a fleur-de-lys of the third (Fox).

Peerage of Great Britain
Preceded by Edward Fox-Strangways	Earl of Ilchester; 1964–1970	Succeeded by Maurice Fox-Strangways
