= Henry Fox, 1st Baron Holland =

English peer and politician (1705–1774)

The Right Honourable The Lord Holland PC
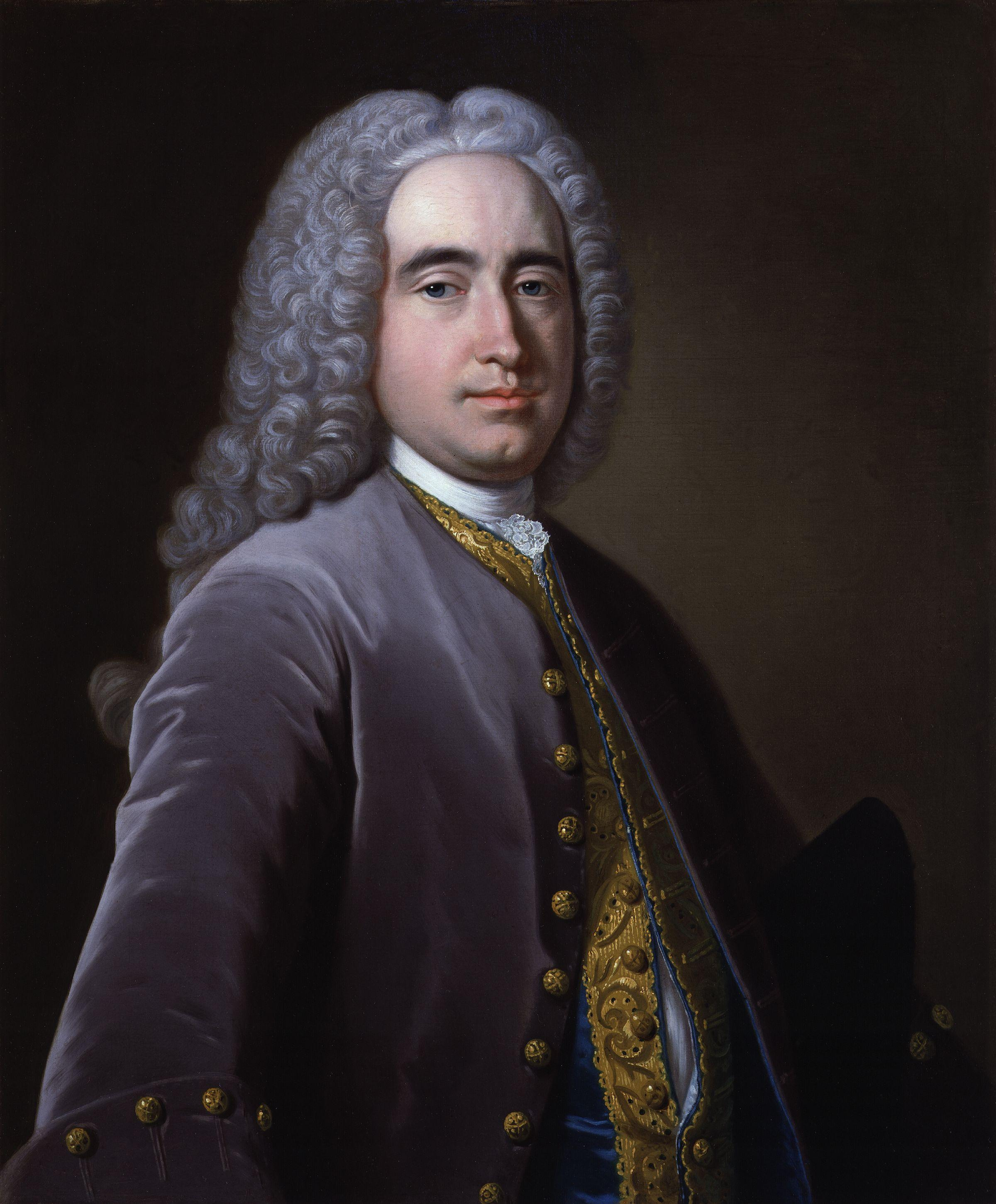
- Portrait by John Giles Eccardt

Leader of the House of Commons
- In office 26 May 1762 – 16 April 1763
- Monarch: George III
- Prime Minister: The Earl of Bute
- Preceded by: George Grenville
- Succeeded by: George Grenville
- In office 14 November 1755 – 13 November 1756
- Monarch: George II
- Prime Minister: The Duke of Newcastle
- Preceded by: Thomas Robinson
- Succeeded by: William Pitt

Paymaster of the Forces
- In office 2 July 1757 – 13 July 1765
- Monarchs: George II; George III
- Prime Minister: The Duke of Newcastle; The Earl of Bute; George Grenville
- Preceded by: Viscount Dupplin; Thomas Potter
- Succeeded by: Charles Townshend

Secretary of State for the Southern Department
- In office 14 November 1755 – 13 November 1756
- Monarch: George II
- Prime Minister: The Duke of Newcastle
- Preceded by: Thomas Robinson
- Succeeded by: William Pitt

Secretary at War
- In office 1746–1755
- Monarch: George II
- Prime Minister: Henry Pelham; The Duke of Newcastle
- Preceded by: Thomas Winnington
- Succeeded by: The Viscount Barrington

Personal details
- Born: 28 September 1705
- Died: 1 July 1774 (aged 68) Holland House, Kensington, Middlesex, England
- Party: Tory (before c. 1735); Whig (after c. 1735)
- Spouse: Lady Caroline Lennox (m. 1744)
- Children: Stephen Fox, 2nd Baron Holland; Hon. Charles James Fox; Gen. Hon. Henry Edward Fox
- Parents: Sir Stephen Fox; Christiana Hope
- Relatives: Fox family
- Education: Eton College
- Profession: Politician

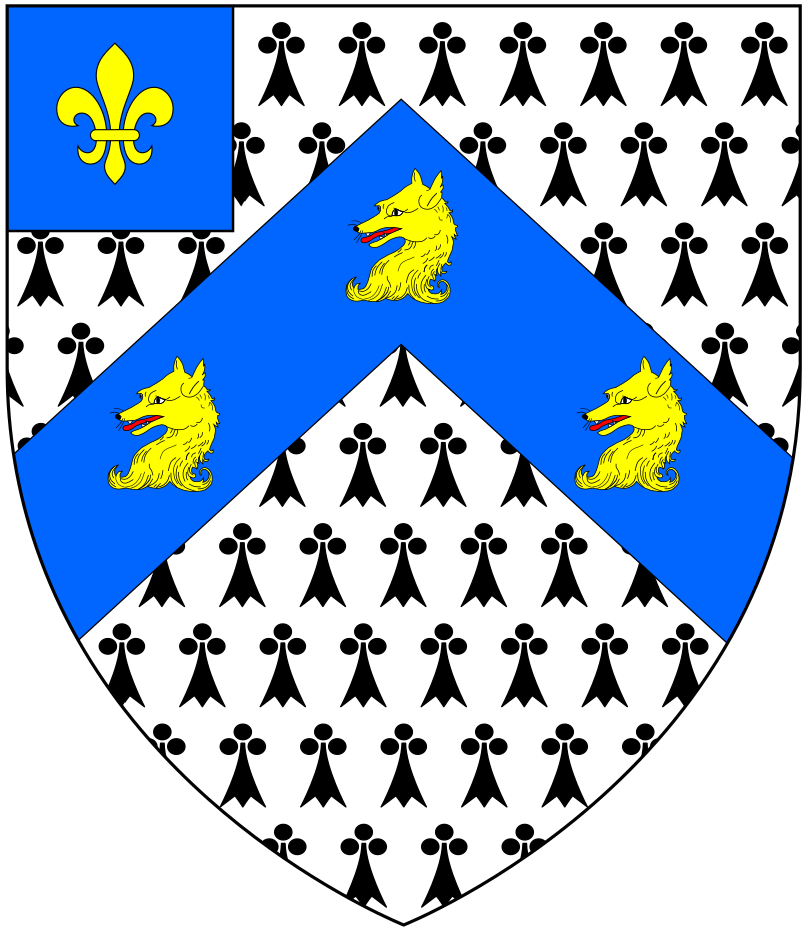
Canting arms of Fox, Baron Holland: Ermine, on a chevron azure three fox's heads and necks erased or on a canton of the second a fleur-de-lys of the third

Henry Fox, 1st Baron Holland, PC (28 September 1705 – 1 July 1774) was an English peer and Whig politician who served as the Secretary at War from 1746 to 1755. He also held the offices of Secretary of State for the Southern Department from 1755 to 1756 and Paymaster of the Forces from 1757 to 1765, enriching himself while holding the latter office. While Fox was widely tipped as a potential candidate for the office of Prime Minister, he never held the office. His third son was the Whig statesman Charles James Fox.

== Early life ==
He was the second son of Sir Stephen Fox (1627–1716) by his second wife, Christiana Hope (d. 1718), and inherited a large share of his father's wealth. He squandered most of it soon after attaining his majority, and went to Continental Europe to escape from his creditors. There he made the acquaintance of a woman of fortune, who became his patroness and was so generous to him that, after several years' absence, he was in a position to return home.

== Marriage and children ==
In 1744 he eloped with and married the much younger Lady Caroline Lennox (1723–1774), the eldest daughter of Charles Lennox, 2nd Duke of Richmond (1701–1750). The Duke of Richmond was the grandson of Charles II, the duke's father having been the child of Charles and his mistress, Louise de Kérouaille, Duchess of Portsmouth. Lady Caroline's marriage caused a great scandal in high society. She was later created Baroness Holland, "of Holland in the County of Lincoln". To his wife, Lord Holland bequeathed £2,000 per annum, with Holland House, Kensington, his plate, etc., but charged with various other legacies. As his residuary legatee it was estimated that she would be worth £120,000 in government securities, besides her jointure. However, she did not long survive him. By his wife he had children including:

- Stephen Fox, 2nd Baron Holland (1745–1774), eldest son and heir, of delicate health in his early childhood. Like his younger brother he was a notorious gambler. His father bequeathed him his Wiltshire estate, £5,000 per annum and £20,000 cash.
- Henry Charles Fox (1746–1746), second son, died in infancy.
- Charles James Fox (1749–1806), third but second surviving son, the noted Whig statesman and notorious gambler. He was born in Conduit Street, Mayfair, as his father's new home of Holland House in Kensington, leased in 1746, was being redecorated. His father bequeathed him his Sheppy and Thanet estates in Kent, including Kingsgate, £900 per annum, and £20,000 cash.
- General Henry Edward Fox (1755–1811), youngest son, to whom his father bequeathed an estate in the North, £500 per annum, and £10,000 cash.

== Politics ==
=== Election ===
In 1727 Fox contested Hindon in Wiltshire on a Tory ticket with George Fox but was defeated on petition. Fox was defeated the next year in a by-election at Old Sarum by a single vote, again as a Tory. Fox's brother Stephen, who was the Member for Shaftesbury, defected to the Whigs in 1730 with his younger brother defecting by 1735. That year he entered Parliament as Member for Hindon, now as a Whig. He became a protégé and devoted supporter of Sir Robert Walpole, the long-standing Prime Minister, achieving unequalled and unenviable proficiency in the worst political arts of his master and model. He earned particular notice with a speech in parliament calling on Britain to support its European allies, principally Austria. He generally aligned with the government Whigs rather than the Patriot Whig faction that opposed them. Until 1742 this meant the government of Walpole but afterwards it was the government (1743–1754) of Henry Pelham to which he lent his support.

A skilled speaker, he was able to hold his own against Pitt himself. This helped him progress in the House of Commons, becoming an indispensable member of several administrations. He served as Surveyor-General of Works from 1737 to 1742, as Member for Windsor from 1741 to 1761 and as a Lord of the Treasury in 1743.

He had eloped with and married the much younger Lady Caroline Lennox, daughter of the Duke of Richmond, in 1744. She was later created Baroness Holland, of Holland in the County of Lincoln. The noted Whig politicians Charles James Fox and the 3rd Baron Holland were his son and grandson, respectively. Another son was the general Henry Edward Fox. He was known for his tendency to spoil his children, whom he allowed to mingle with the numerous public figures who came to dine at the Fox household. Charles would later grow up to be a politician of equal note to his father, many of whose policies and friendships he subsequently adopted although he tended more toward radicalism than the elder Fox.

=== Secretary at War ===
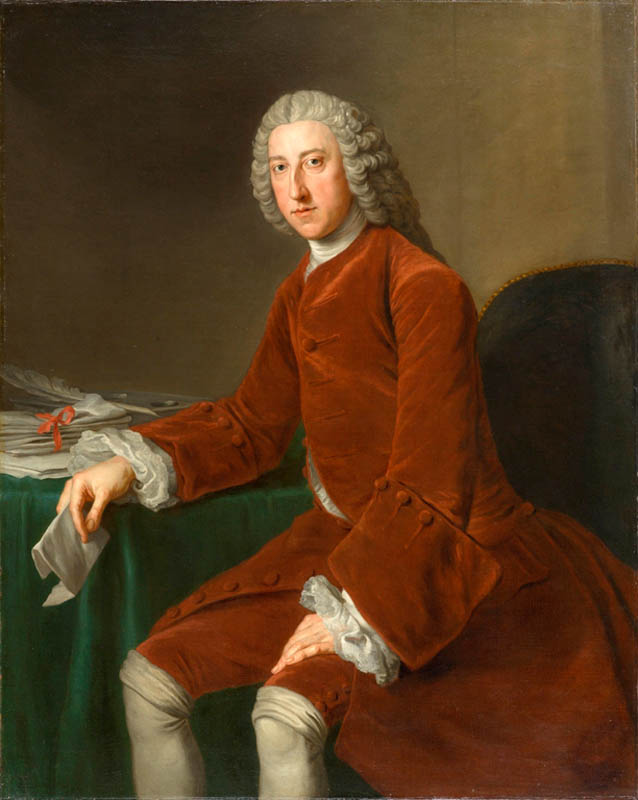
William Pitt, 1st Earl of Chatham, the bitter political rival of Fox, despite both belonging to the Whig faction

Fox was appointed Secretary at War and member of the Privy Council in 1746, at a time when Britain was engaged in the War of the Austrian Succession. At the time much of the nation's foreign policy was dominated by the Duke of Newcastle, who also served as a de facto Defence Minister, with Fox acting largely as a deputy and being called upon to defend the government's defence policy in the House of Commons.

During these years he became a close friend and confidante of the Duke of Cumberland, the King's third and youngest son, who had become known for his suppression of the Jacobite rebellion of 1745. He had also gained fame on the Continent as military commander of Britain's forces there. He had built himself a notable political following in London and, perhaps most importantly to Fox, offered a channel of communication to King George II of Great Britain. Fox soon grew to be a favourite of George II as well, who would in the future support his inclusion in governments in much the same way he would oppose Pitt's membership

By the early 1750s, Fox and Pitt were both viewed as likely future leaders of the country. This pushed their rivalry to yet further lengths. Fox through his office as War Secretary was closer to the top office while Pitt languished in opposition. In 1754, the sudden death of Pelham brought their rivalry to a head. The new Prime Minister, Pelham's brother, the Duke of Newcastle, needed a strong figure to represent him in the House of Commons. This job would command immense prestige and influence, and Pitt and Fox were considered the outstanding favourites to attain it.

Newcastle, fearing the relentless ambitions of both men, ultimately chose neither and instead selected Sir Thomas Robinson. To try to assuage Fox, Newcastle had first offered the post to him but with unacceptable conditions attached so that Fox would refuse the post, allowing Newcastle to offer it to his favoured candidate, Robinson.

Robinson, who was considered a nonentity, was poorly equipped to the task and struggled to defend the government from the strident attacks it now came under from Fox and Pitt, who were both angry at being spurned. By this point the government was facing a serious situation in America and Newcastle began to consider more seriously an alliance with either Pitt or Fox. Ultimately, he chose Fox in the belief that Pitt could be controlled less easily.

=== Alliance with Newcastle ===
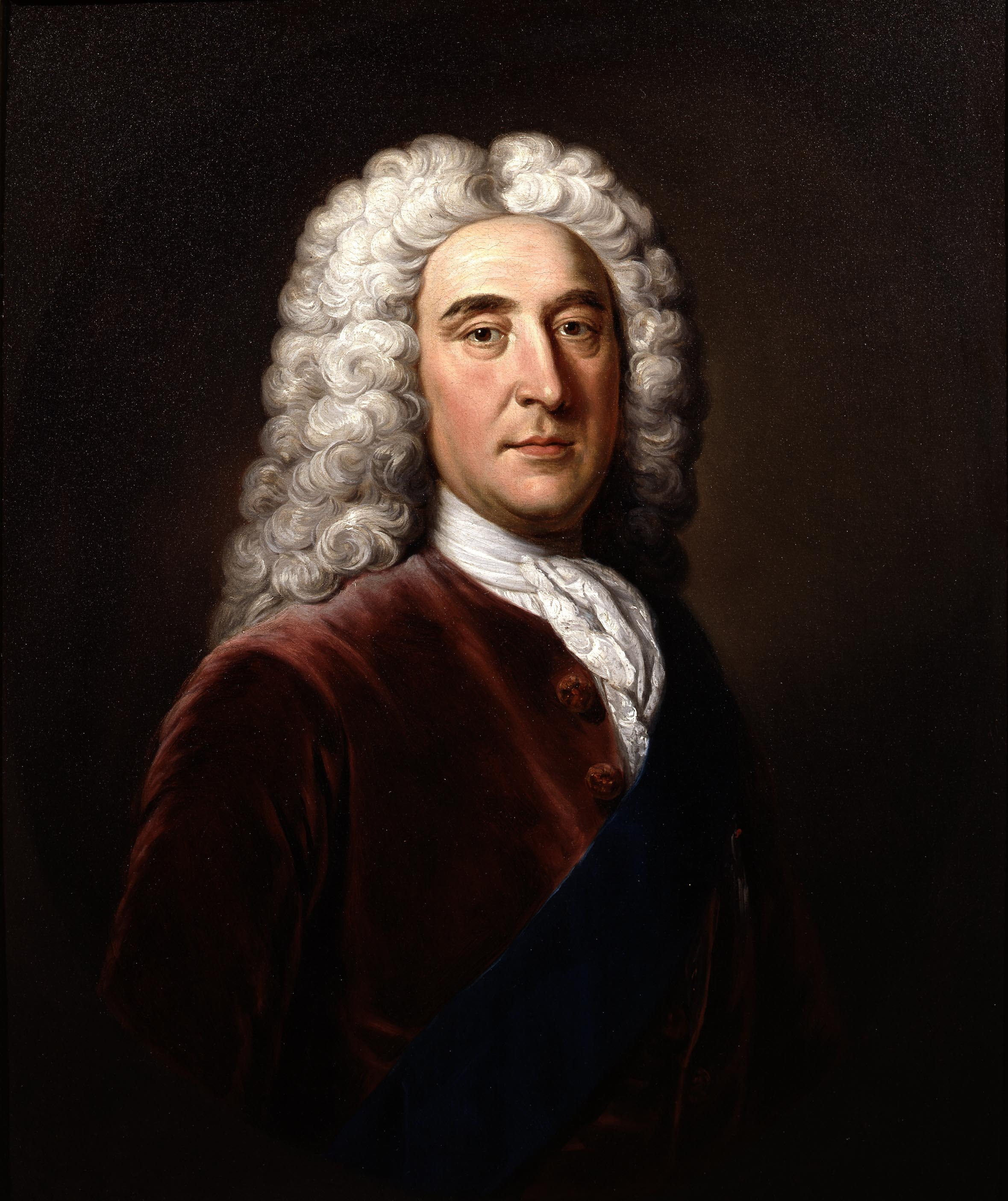
Thomas Pelham-Holles, 1st Duke of Newcastle, with whom in 1755 Fox formed a political alliance, but their government soon fell. Newcastle later made an agreement with Fox's enemy William Pitt, forming the Pitt-Newcastle Ministry

Forced into the move by circumstances beyond his control Newcastle agreed the terms of the partnership with Fox. In 1755 Fox was given the dual roles of Leader of the House of Commons and Southern Secretary. The alliance between them was seen as the only way to forestall a similar proposed government including Pitt, who was considered a bitter enemy of both men. Newcastle could scarcely contain his growing distaste for Fox, who he considered grasping. Fox was heavily influenced by Cumberland, who favoured a strong response to a dispute with the French in the Ohio Country. The two men forced the policy on a more reluctant Newcastle.

It was decided to despatch a large British force under the command of Edward Braddock to America to drive the French out of Ohio Territory. Braddock's column met with disaster in July 1755 and when news of this reached London, the pressure increased on Newcastle and Fox. Pitt mocked the inept handling of the crisis and suggested Britain was ill-prepared for a major war that might break out with the French over the issue. Ultimately war broke out with France the following year over the issue of its invasion of Prussia rather than the North American situation. Fox and Newcastle, realising that Menorca was severely vulnerable to a French attack, despatched a naval force to relieve the island.

The fleet was unable to prevent the Fall of Menorca, leading to a major public outburst against both its commander, Admiral Sir John Byng, and the government. Fox and Newcastle initiated a prosecution against Byng by accusing him of cowardice. Byng was later shot after a court martial for "failing to do his utmost", a verdict that opponents of the government saw as a move to protect Newcastle and Fox from censure. Fox feared that he himself would be made the "scapegoat" blamed Newcastle for not giving Byng enough ships. On 13 October 1756, Fox resigned, fatally weakening Newcastle, whose ministry collapsed completely that November.

He was replaced by a government dominated by Pitt. However, Pitt had little control over most MPs and struggled to control the House of Commons. After a few months, the government collapsed in April 1757. The King wanted Newcastle and Fox to return, restoring their previous government, but by now, Newcastle felt a bitter hatred towards Fox over the Byng Affair, and refused to serve with him. A three-month spell followed in which Britain's war effort was essentially leaderless. With the continued support of Cumberland, Fox retained high hopes of gaining the premiership. However, he could not come to a necessary agreement with either Pitt or Newcastle. In mid-summer, Pitt and Newcastle defied expectations, and formed a political partnership. Left out in the cold by this, Fox now turned his attentions instead to attaining a profitable position.

=== Paymaster General of the Forces ===
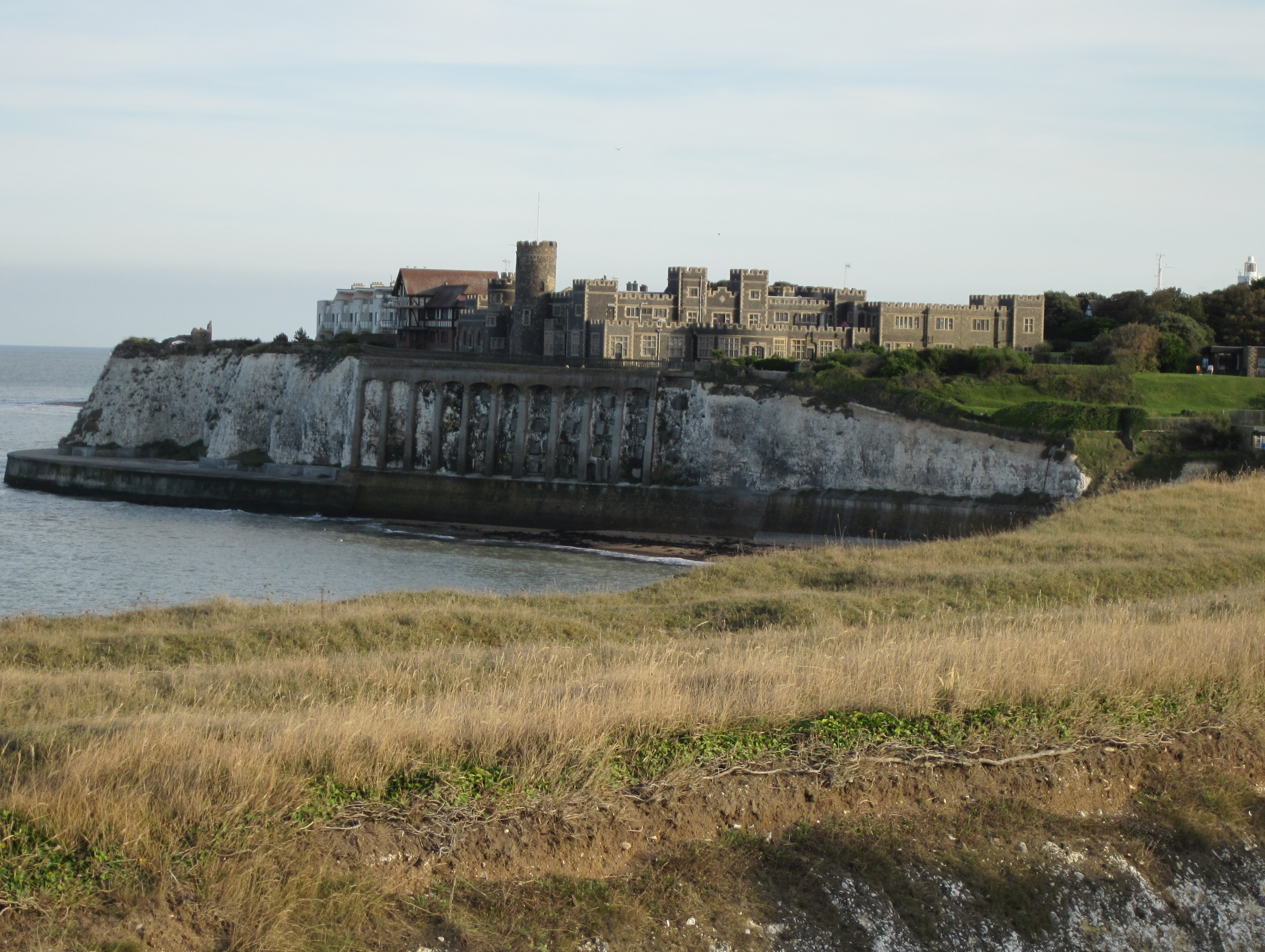
Kingsgate Castle in Kent was built by Holland, although most of the current structure is Victorian

In 1757, in the rearrangements of the government, Fox was ultimately excluded from the Cabinet and given the post of Paymaster of the Forces. This office had a continuous history from 1662, when Henry Fox's father, Sir Stephen Fox, had been the first tenant. Before his time, it had been the custom to appoint Treasurers at War ad hoc for specific campaigns; the practice of the Protectorate Government foreshadowed, however, a permanent office. Within a generation of the Restoration, the status of the Paymastership began to change. In 1692, the Paymaster, the Earl of Ranelagh, was sworn of the privy council; and thereafter, every Paymaster – or, when there were two Paymasters, at least one of them – was sworn of the council if not already a member. From the accession of Queen Anne, the Paymaster tended to change with the Ministry, and 18th century appointments must be considered as made not upon merit alone but by merit and political affiliation, the office becoming a political prize and perhaps potentially the most lucrative that a parliamentary career had to offer.

During the war, Fox devoted himself mainly to accumulating a vast fortune. The British Army expanded a great deal during these years, giving him further scope for irregularities. He collaborated with Nicholas Magens and George Amyand. By some estimates he was calculated to have amassed £400,000 in his eight years in the office, an average of £50,000 a year. Around 1760 he built the original Kingsgate Castle near Broadstairs, Kent, of which only the tower now remains.

In 1762, he again accepted the leadership of the House, with a seat in the Cabinet, under Lord Bute, and managed to induce the House of Commons to approve of the Treaty of Paris; as a reward, he was raised to the House of Lords as Baron Holland of Foxley in the County of Wilts, on 16 April 1763.

==== Resignation ====
In 1765, Fox was forced to resign the Paymaster Generalship, and four years later, a petition of the Livery of the City of London delivered by the Lord Mayor of London William Beckford against the Ministers referred to him as "the public defaulter of unaccounted millions". (Note: For an account of Beckford's speech, see the Gentleman's Magazine, 1769, pp. 290, 329ff, 363.)

It was not the first time that he had been attacked on the financial conduct of his office. In 1763, in a debate opened by Sir John Phillips, William Aislabie had raised much the same issue in the Commons and was received with 'loud marks of approbation'; (Note: Horace Walpole, Memoirs of the Reign of George III, ed. D. le Marchant, 1845, i. 243.) but on this occasion, little public attention was aroused, and 1769 was the first time that it was taken up with vigour and outside parliament. The city's address, like a Middlesex petition of the previous month, echoed charges made in the Commons when Alderman Beckford, the mouthpiece of many popular causes, had asserted that more than forty millions of public money remained unaccounted for in the army Pay Office and that legal process in regard to this had been issued from the exchequer but had been suspended by the king's signed manual warrant. Beckford had called upon members of the Treasury Board then present to correct him if he had been misinformed, but not a word had been uttered. (Note: The date of this is uncertain, but it is not unlikely to have been during the debate on the Budget of 1769. The occasion for the attack would seem to be the active part taken by Stephen and Charles James Fox against Wilkes in the Middlesex election.)

The proceedings brought against him in the Court of Exchequer were delayed by a Royal Warrant; and he proved that in the delays in making up the accounts of his office, he had not broken the law. From the interest on the outstanding balances, he had nonetheless amassed a fortune.

=== Later life ===
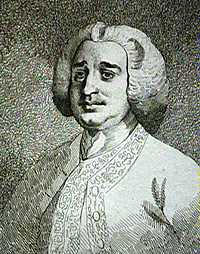
Henry Fox, 1st Baron Holland

He tried in vain to obtain promotion to an earldom, a title on which he had set his heart, and he died at Holland House, Kensington, a sorely disappointed man, with a reputation for cunning and unscrupulousness, the most unpopular politician of his day.

== Legacy ==
When Fox had first arrived on the political scene, many had considered him as the greatest politician of his generation. Many saw him as a future Prime Minister, who could lead a revolution of the "New Whigs" against the old-style patriarchy of men like the Duke of Newcastle. In 1755 he had disappointed them first by making an alliance with Newcastle, and then in 1757 by turning his back on serious politics by accepting the Paymaster General post, a lucrative but unimportant post that signalled to many he was no longer a serious contender for high office. Rumours that he had misappropriated £400,000 during his eight years in the job did little to help his reputation as vain and mercenary and that he been under the influence of the notorious socialite Lady Etheldreda Townshend. Most depictions in popular culture have portrayed him in such a light.

His son Charles James Fox also became a leading light in the Whig party and many too considered him a future national leader. Fox, however, became associated with much the same sort of figures as his father had. In a strange parallel he was frustrated in his bid to become Prime Minister by that of Pitt's younger son William Pitt the Younger who held the office for twenty years continuously, leaving Fox out in the wilderness in much the same way the Elder Pitt had done to Henry Fox.

In the 1999 British television series Aristocrats depicting the lives of the wealthy Lennox family during the 18th century, Fox was portrayed by Alun Armstrong.

== Citations ==
Parliament of Great Britain
Preceded by Stephen Fox; George Fox	Member of Parliament for Hindon; 1735–1741; With: George Fox	Succeeded by Henry Calthorpe; William Steele
Preceded by Lord Sidney Beauclerk; Lord Vere Beauclerk	Member of Parliament for Windsor; 1741–1761; With: Lord Sidney Beauclerk 1741–1744; Lord George Beauclerk 1744–1754; John Fitzwilliam 1754–1761	Succeeded by John Fitzwilliam; Augustus Keppel
Preceded by Sir Jacob Downing, Bt; Alexander Forrester	Member of Parliament for Dunwich; 1761–1763; With: Eliab Harvey	Succeeded by Sir Jacob Downing, Bt; Eliab Harvey
Political offices
Preceded by Thomas Winnington	Secretary at War; 1746–1755	Succeeded by The Viscount Barrington
Preceded by Thomas Robinson	Secretary of State for the Southern Department; 1755–1756	Succeeded by William Pitt
Preceded by Thomas Robinson	Leader of the House of Commons; 1755–1756	Succeeded by William Pitt
Preceded by Viscount Dupplin; Thomas Potter	Paymaster of the Forces; 1757–1765	Succeeded by Charles Townshend
Preceded by George Grenville	Leader of the House of Commons; 1762 – 1763	Succeeded by George Grenville
Peerage of Great Britain
New creation	Baron Holland (of Foxley); 1763–1774	Succeeded by Stephen Fox
