= Henry Vassall-Fox, 3rd Baron Holland =

British politician (1773–1840)

The Right Honourable The Lord Holland PC
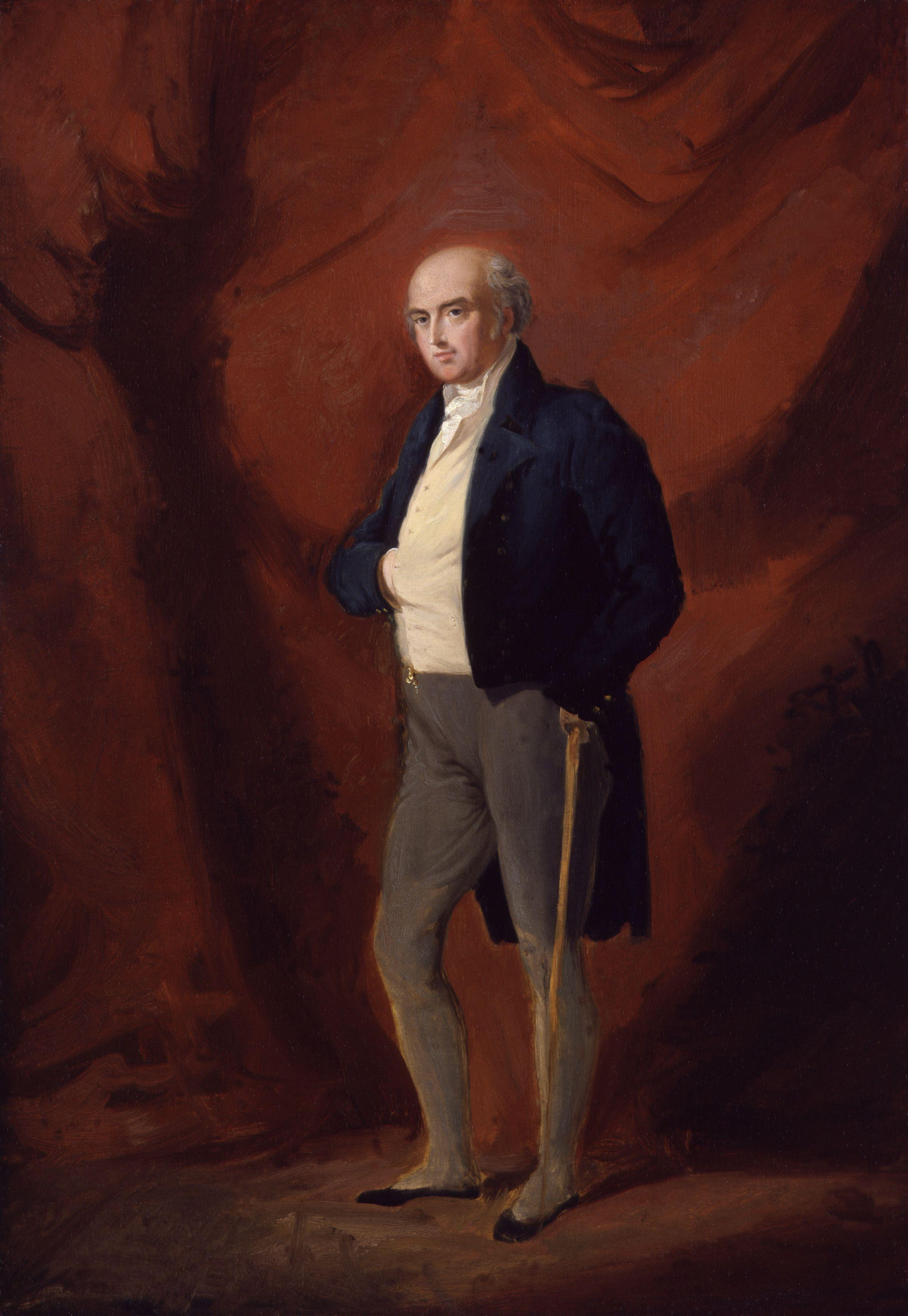
- Portrait by Sir George Hayter, 1820

Lord Privy Seal
- In office 8 October 1806 – 31 March 1807
- Monarch: George III
- Prime Minister: The Lord Grenville
- Preceded by: The Viscount Sidmouth
- Succeeded by: The Earl of Westmorland

Chancellor of the Duchy of Lancaster
- In office 25 November 1830 – 14 November 1834
- Monarch: William IV
- Prime Minister: The Earl Grey; The Viscount Melbourne
- Preceded by: Charles Arbuthnot
- Succeeded by: Charles Williams-Wynn
- In office 20 February 1835 – 22 October 1840
- Monarchs: William IV; Victoria
- Prime Minister: The Viscount Melbourne
- Preceded by: Charles Williams-Wynn
- Succeeded by: The Earl of Clarendon

Personal details
- Born: 21 November 1773 Winterslow House, Wiltshire
- Died: 22 October 1840 (aged 66)
- Party: Whig
- Spouse: Elizabeth Vassall
- Children: 7, including: Charles Richard Fox; Henry Fox, 4th Baron Holland
- Parent(s): Stephen Fox, 2nd Baron Holland; Lady Mary FitzPatrick
- Relatives: Fox family
- Education: Christ Church, Oxford

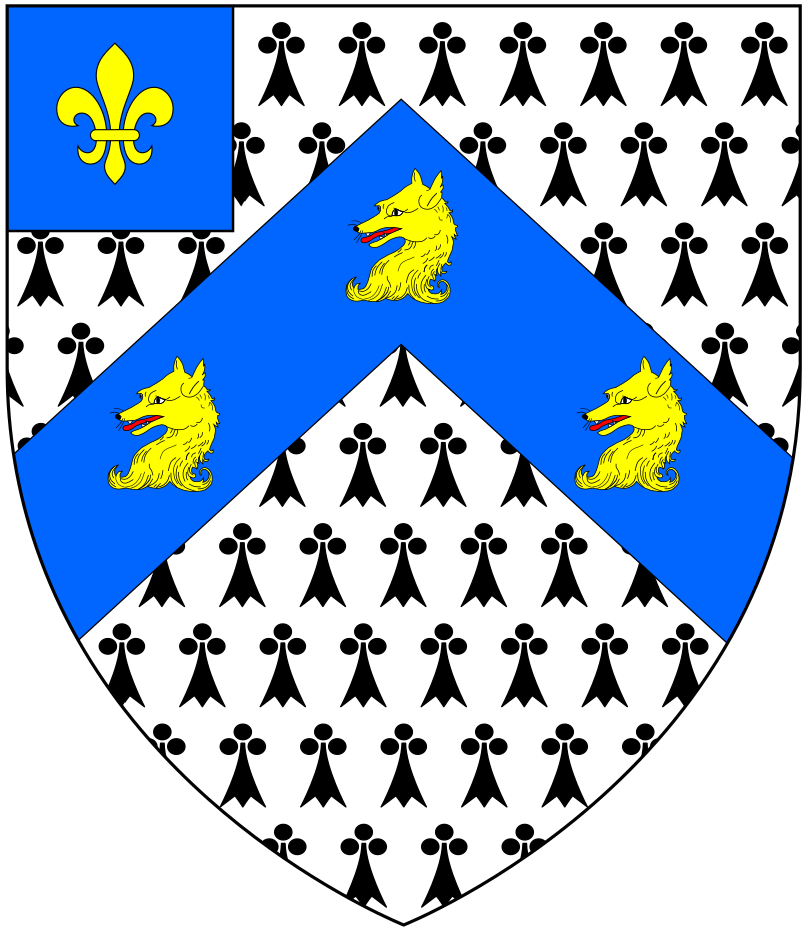
Canting arms of Fox, Baron Holland: Ermine, on a chevron azure three fox's heads and necks erased or on a canton of the second a fleur-de-lys of the third

Henry Richard Vassall-Fox, 3rd Baron Holland, PC (21 November 1773 – 22 October 1840) was a British Whig politician. A grandson of Henry Fox, 1st Baron Holland, and nephew of Charles James Fox, he served as Lord Privy Seal between 1806 and 1807 in the Ministry of All the Talents headed by Lord Grenville and as Chancellor of the Duchy of Lancaster between 1830 and 1834 and again between 1835 and his death in 1840 in the Whig administrations of Lord Grey and Lord Melbourne.

== Background and education ==
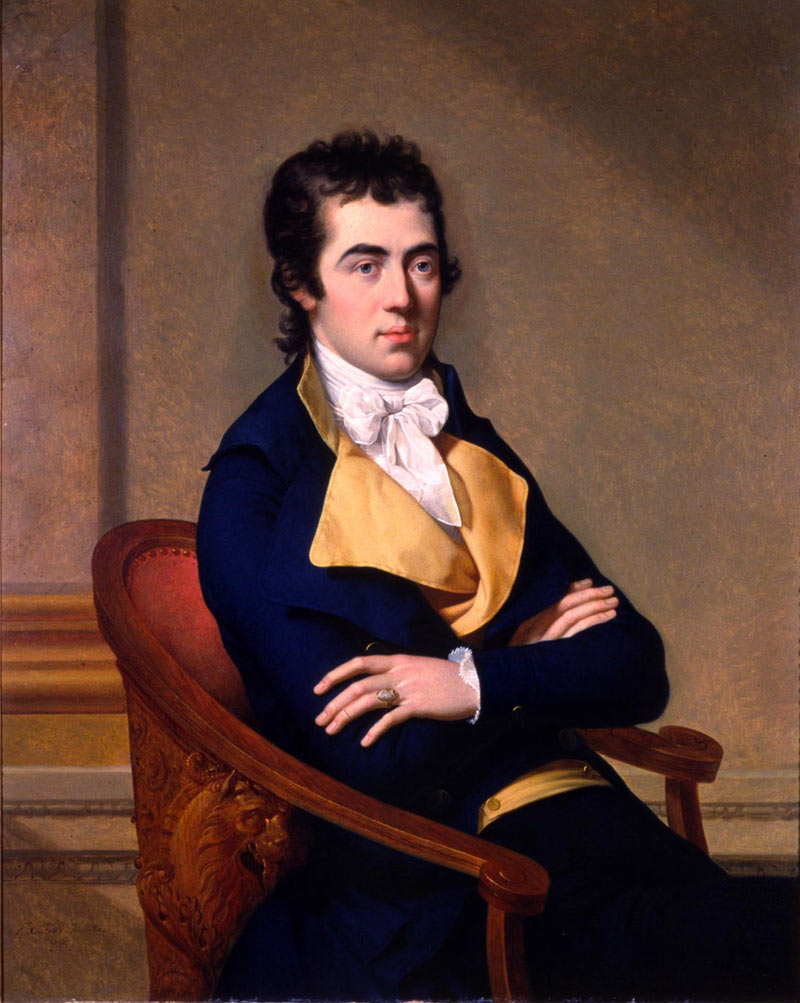
Portrait of Lord Holland by François-Xavier Fabre, 1795.

Holland was born at Winterslow House, Wiltshire, the son of Stephen Fox, 2nd Baron Holland (1745–1774), and Lady Mary FitzPatrick, daughter of John FitzPatrick, 1st Earl of Upper Ossory, and Lady Evelyn, daughter of John Leveson-Gower, 1st Earl Gower. His paternal grandparents were Henry Fox, 1st Baron Holland, and Lady Caroline Lennox, the eldest of the famous Lennox sisters and a great-granddaughter (through an illegitimate line) of King Charles II.

He succeeded in the baronies in December 1774, aged one, on the early death of his father, while his mother died shortly before his fifth birthday. He was educated at Eton and Christ Church, Oxford, where he became the friend of George Canning and John Hookham Frere. Lord Holland's uncle was the great Whig orator Charles James Fox, and he remained steadily loyal to the Whig party.

== Political career ==
On a visit to Paris in 1791, Holland became acquainted with Lafayette and Talleyrand. He took his seat in the House of Lords on 5 October 1796. According to the 1911 edition of the Encyclopædia Britannica he for a while "almost... constituted the Whig party in the upper house". He was appointed to negotiate a treaty with American envoys James Monroe and William Pinkney, was admitted to the Privy Council on 27 August 1806, and on 15 October entered the Ministry of All the Talents led by Lord Grenville as Lord Privy Seal, retiring with the rest of his colleagues in March 1807.

Holland led the opposition to the Regency Bill in 1811, and he attacked the orders in council and other strong measures of the government taken to counteract Napoleon's Berlin Decrees. He denounced the treaty of 1813 with Sweden which bound Britain to consent to the forcible union of Norway, and he resisted the bill of 1816 for confining Napoleon in Saint Helena. He was Chancellor of the Duchy of Lancaster between 1830 and 1834 and 1835 and 1840 in the cabinets of Lord Grey and Lord Melbourne, and he was still in office when he died in October 1840.

== Slavery ==
On 5 February 1807, during a debate in the House of Lords over the proposed Slave Trade Act 1807, Holland spoke in support of the act and claimed that it was "impossible to believe that the state of a negro in the West Indies was such as to lead him to prefer it even to slavery in Africa, and it was absurd to think so, considering the new kind of labour to which he was condemned, when he had never been accustomed to such habits, and when he must be torn from his country and connections."

With the Slave Compensation Act 1837 in the aftermath of the Slavery Abolition Act 1833, the government paid compensation to former slaveholders. Lord Holland was compensated under three awards for slaves on his estates in Jamaica, which had come to him through his wife, Elizabeth Webster (née Vassall).

== Writings ==
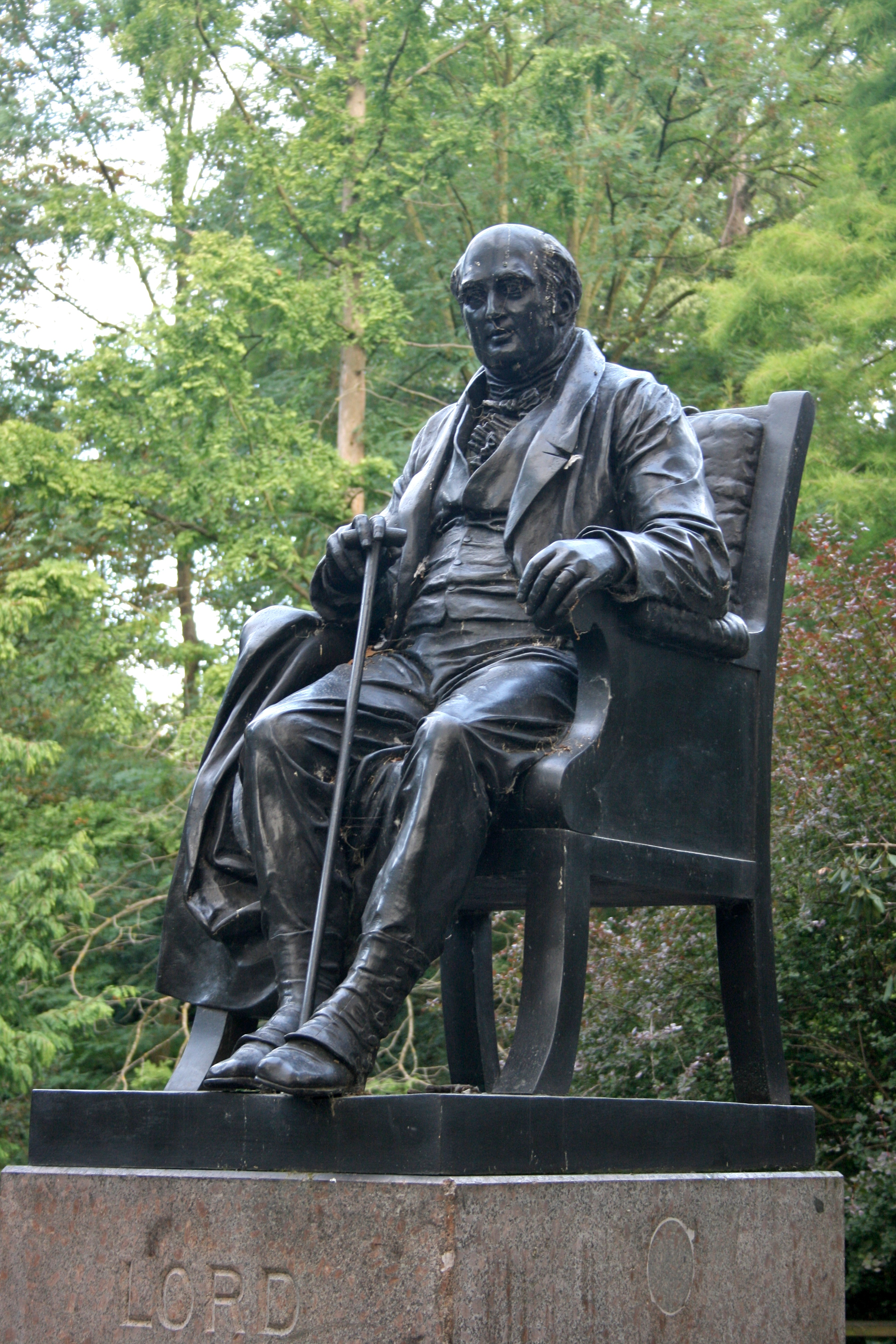
Lord Holland's statue rises from a pond in Holland Park, London.

Holland's protests against the measures of the Tory ministers were collected and published, as the Opinions of Lord Holland (1841), by Dr Moylan of Lincoln's Inn. Lord Holland's Foreign Reminiscences (1850) contain much amusing gossip from the Revolutionary and Napoleonic era. His Memoirs of the Whig Party (1852; 2 vols.) is an important contemporary authority. He also published a small work on Lope de Vega (1806) and a 2-volume work (1817) on the lives and writings of Lope de Vega and Guillén de Castro. His whimsical short story Eve's Legend, in which the only vowel used is the letter E, is considered a precursor to the constraints of the Oulipo school.

== Family ==
After visiting Paris in 1791 Holland again went abroad to travel in France and Italy in 1793. At Florence he met Elizabeth Vassall, at that time Lady Webster, wife of Sir Godfrey Webster, 4th Baronet. She and her husband obtained a divorce, and she married Holland on 6 July 1797, becoming Elizabeth Fox, Baroness Holland. An illegitimate son, Charles Richard Fox, was born to them. He later rose to become a General in the British Army.

They had three more children who survived infancy: the Hon. Stephen Fox (d. 1800), Henry Edward Fox, 4th Baron Holland, and Hon. Mary Elizabeth Fox, married to Thomas Powys, 3rd Baron Lilford. In 1800 he was authorised to take the name of Vassall, and after 1807 he signed himself Vassall Holland, though the name was no part of his title. Lord Holland died in October 1840, aged 66, and was succeeded in his titles by his eldest and only surviving legitimate son, Henry. Lady Holland died in November 1845.

== Vassall ward ==
Vassall ward in the London Borough of Lambeth is named after Henry Richard Vassall-Fox who was responsible for the first building development in the area in the 1820s. Roads in the area such as Holland Grove, Lord Holland Lane, Foxley Square and Vassall Road commemorate this connection.

Political offices
Preceded by The Viscount Sidmouth	Lord Privy Seal; 1806–1807	Succeeded by The Earl of Westmorland
Preceded by Charles Arbuthnot	Chancellor of the Duchy of Lancaster; 1830–1834	Succeeded by Charles Williams-Wynn
Preceded by Charles Williams-Wynn	Chancellor of the Duchy of Lancaster; 1835–1840	Succeeded by The Earl of Clarendon
Peerage of Great Britain
Preceded by Stephen Fox	Baron Holland of Holland; 1774–1840	Succeeded by Henry Edward Fox
Preceded by Stephen Fox	Baron Holland of Foxley; 1774–1840	Succeeded by Henry Edward Fox
