= Maurice Fox-Strangways, 9th Earl of Ilchester =

British engineer

Maurice Vivian de Touffreville Fox-Strangways, 9th Earl of Ilchester
- Born: 1 April 1920; Port Tawfiq, Suez, Sultanate of Egypt
- Died: 2 July 2006 (aged 86); England
- Military career
- Allegiance: United Kingdom
- Branch: Royal Air Force (1936-76)
- Service years: 1936-1976
- Rank: Group Captain

Group Captain Maurice Vivian de Touffreville Fox-Strangways, 9th Earl of Ilchester (1 April 1920 – 2 July 2006), styled Lord Stavordale between 1964 and 1970, was a British engineer. He served in the Royal Air Force for 40 years, from 1936 to 1976. From 1955, he concentrated mainly as an engineer involved with nuclear weapons. He succeeded his father as Earl of Ilchester in 1970, and was also an active cross-bench member of the House of Lords until 1999.

== Background and education ==
His father was Walter Angelo Fox-Strangways, 8th Earl of Ilchester. Fox-Strangways was born in Port Tawfiq in Egypt while his father was serving in the British foreign consular service. He was educated at the now-defunct Kingsbridge Grammar School, and joined the Royal Air Force (RAF) as an apprentice in January 1936, aged 15.

== World War II and post-war military career ==
He trained at RAF Halton and was posted to RAF Brize Norton, where he served during the early months of the Battle of Britain. According to family folklore, he was bathing when an August 1940 air raid began. He ran naked into an air-raid shelter, which happened to be reserved for members of the WAAF. After this introduction, he married one of them, Diana Simpson, in November 1941.

He completed his service in the Second World War in India and the Far East. By his return to England in 1946, he was a Warrant Officer. He continued his service at RAF Negombo in Ceylon and RAF Kai Tak in Hong Kong.

Fox-Strangeways was selected for commissioning and he attended the Royal Air Force Technical College at RAF Henlow in 1953. By the mid-1950s he was a Squadron Leader and became involved with the development of nuclear weapons at the Directorate of Air Armament Engineering. He then moved to the headquarters of RAF Bomber Command to work on the introduction of Thor intercontinental ballistic missiles, before working at the missile testing range at Woomera in South Australia. He then served at the V bomber base at RAF Finningley.

As a wing commander, he served at RAF Biggin Hill, involved in recruitment of officers and aircrew. Finally, promoted to group captain, he was the assistant director of air weapons development at the Ministry of Technology, and was involved with the UK's Polaris ballistic missile programme.

== Succession to earldom and House of Lords ==
Fox-Strangways succeeded as Earl of Ilchester on the death of his father in 1970. He retired from the RAF in 1976, having held every rank from aircraft apprentice to group captain. In the House of Lords, he sat as a crossbencher from 1976, but waiting until 27 February 1980 to make his maiden speech. He attended regularly until the hereditary peers were removed from the Lords in 1999. He was a member of the Select committee on science and technology.

Outside the House of Lords, he was a director of Nottingham Building Society from 1982 to 1989. He was active in the RAF Association at Biggin Hill. He was president of the Society of Engineers, and later a patron. He was a Fellow of the Nuclear Institute (formerly the Institute of Nuclear Engineers), and its president from 1982 to 1984. He was a Freeman of the Guild of Air Pilots and Air Navigators and became a liveryman in 1987. He was a Freemason in the St George and Corner Stone Lodge.

He had no children, but was survived by his wife of over 64 years. On his death, the Earldom passed to his nephew, Robin Maurice Fox-Strangways, 10th Earl of Ilchester.

== Arms ==
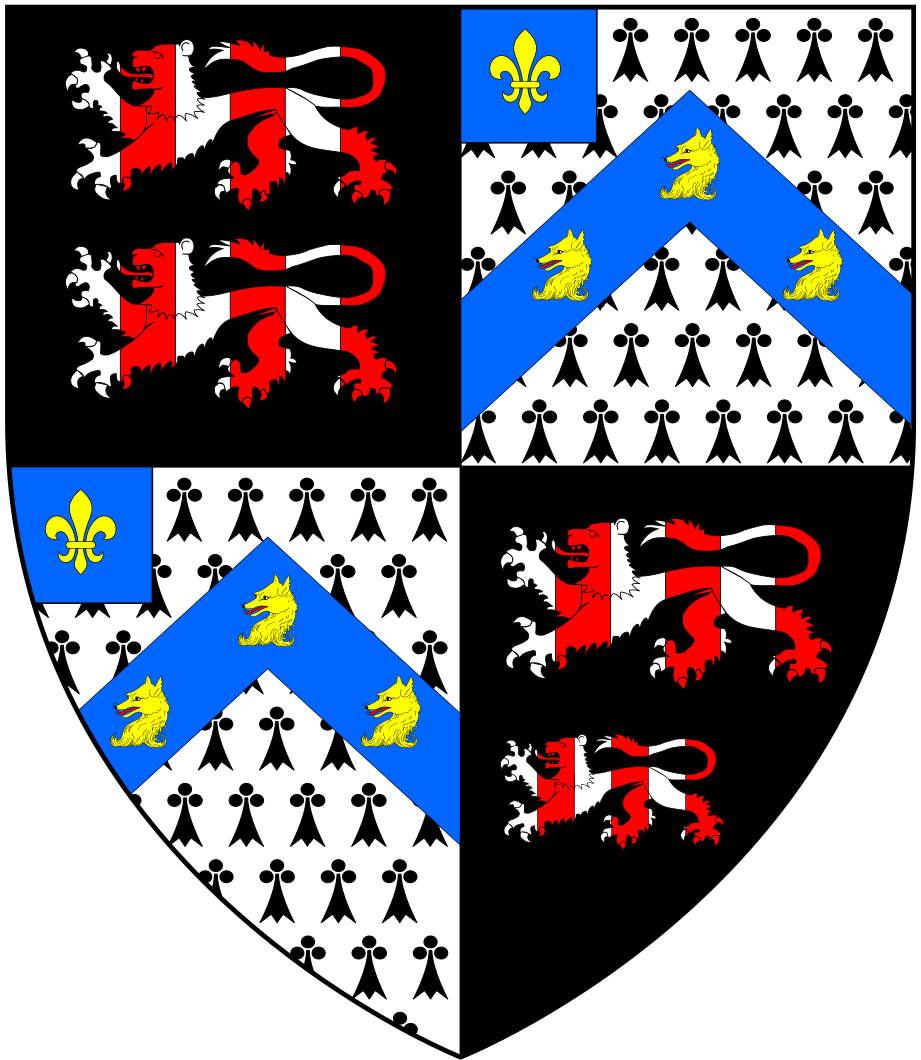
Arms of Fox-Strangways

The arms of the head of the Fox-Strangways family are blazoned Quarterly of four: 1st & 4th: Sable, two lions passant paly of six argent and gules (Strangways); 2nd & 3rd: Ermine, on a chevron azure three foxes' heads and necks erased or on a canton of the second a fleur-de-lys of the third (Fox).

Peerage of Great Britain
Preceded by Walter Angelo Fox-Strangways	Earl of Ilchester; 1970–2006	Succeeded by Robin Maurice Fox-Strangways
