= Elizabeth Armistead =

English courtesan

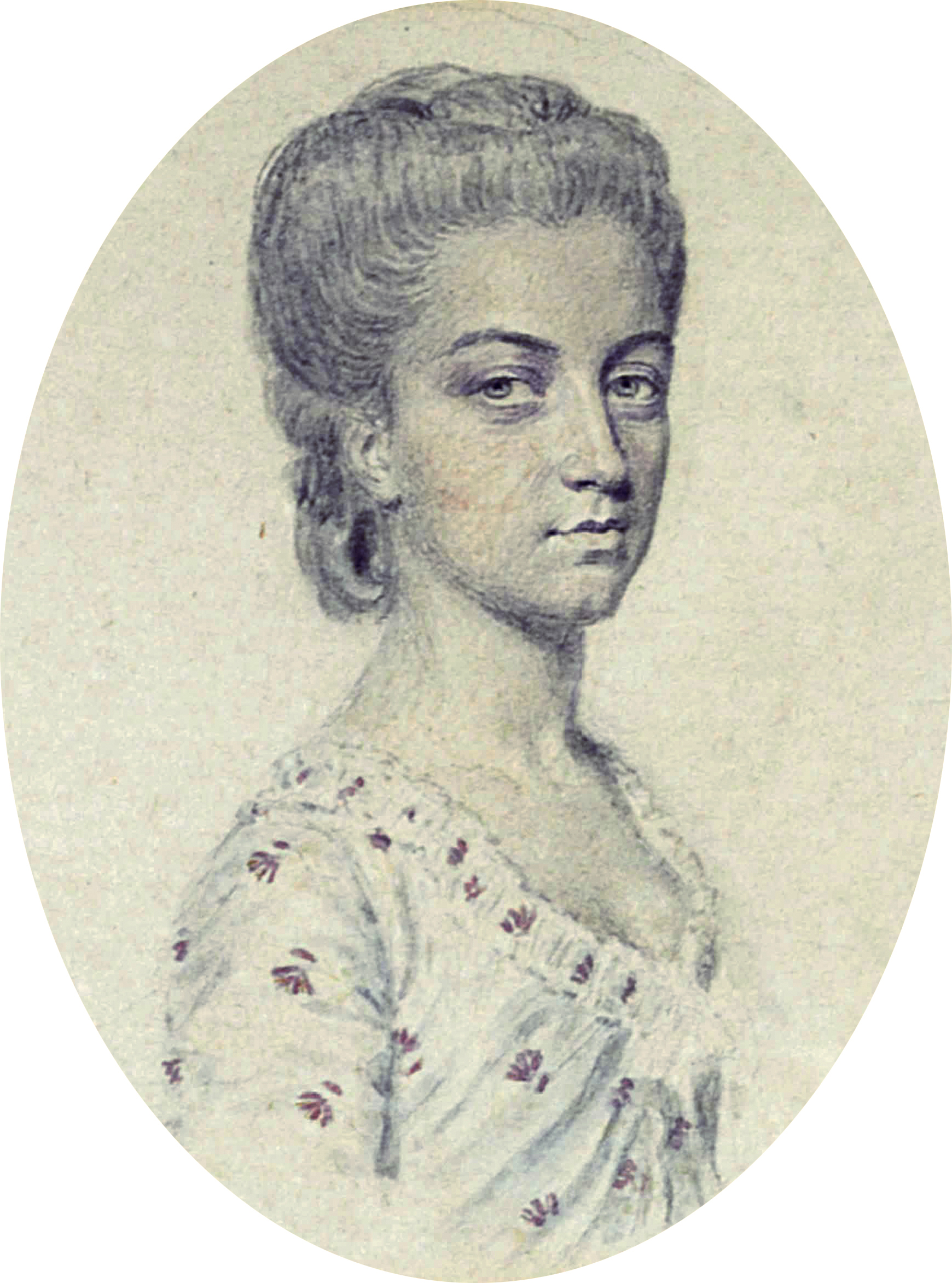
- Born: Elizabeth Bridget Cane; 11 July 1750; Greenwich, England
- Died: 8 July 1842 (aged 91)
- Occupations: Courtesan, actress
- Spouse: Charles James Fox

Elizabeth Bridget Armistead or Armitstead (11 July 1750 – 8 July 1842) was a courtesan and, later, the wife of statesman and politician Charles James Fox. Her relationship with and marriage to Fox was one of the most famous and controversial of their age.

== Early life ==
Elizabeth Armistead was born Elizabeth Bridget Cane on 11 July 1750. Later items in The Public Advertiser and Town and Country Magazine reported her place of birth as Greenwich, London, and her parentage as variously a market porter and an herb-vendor or a shoemaker turned Methodist lay preacher, but biographer I. M. Davis gives such accounts little credence. Samuel Rogers believed she had once been a waiting woman to actress Fanny Abington. The reasons for her changing her maiden name to Armistead or Armitstead are unknown.

She began her career in an exclusive, high-class brothel in London, though which one is uncertain. An entry in Sir Joshua Reynolds's appointment books for 1771 includes a marginal annotation, "Mrs Armistead at Mrs Mitchell's, Upper John Street, Soho Square". Together with Charlotte Hayes and Jane Goadby, Elizabeth Mitchell was one of the most infamous brothel-keepers of the time. (See Harris's List of Covent Garden Ladies, a description of prostitutes of that era, for context.) It was perhaps at one such establishment that Armistead met her first documented patron, Frederick St John, 2nd Viscount Bolingbroke.

Many years later, George Wyndham, 3rd Earl of Egremont, recalled how he and a group of young friends, including Charles James Fox, had taken a visiting French nobleman to a bawdy-house. On learning that their friend Bolingbroke was being entertained by one of the women, Egremont, Fox and the others kicked the door open. The woman was Elizabeth Armistead.

== Career as a courtesan ==
Not long after the incident with Fox and Egremont, Lord Bolingbroke took Mrs Armistead out of the brothel and made her his mistress. Divorced from Lady Diana Spencer, Bolingbroke had consorted with many of the most celebrated courtesans of the time. According to Westminster Magazine, he arranged for his new mistress to try her hand at acting. In the autumn of 1774, billed as "a young lady who has never appeared on any stage", Elizabeth Armistead appeared three times at Covent Garden playhouse, performing the role of Indiana in Richard Steele's The Conscious Lovers. Shortly thereafter, she played Perdita in A Winter's Tale. The magazine was critical of her acting but praised her figure and voice.

As the viscount's mistress, Armistead soon made friends with his circle including Fox, Egremont, the Hon. Richard FitzPatrick, Lord Robert Spencer, and James Hare. Her beauty and gentle nature made her sought after and ensured her the attentions of a string of rich and notable clients. By 1776, Town and Country reported that she could "claim the conquest of two ducal coronets, a marquis, four earls and a viscount".

Elizabeth Armistead's standing as mistress to high nobility attracted the interest of General Richard Smith, a man of humble origins who had amassed a fortune while in command of the East India Company's army of Bengal. Smith provided his new mistress with the leasehold of a house on Bond Street and a handsome allowance to maintain it. He may also have given her an annuity. The General enjoyed little of her company however, for he was soon imprisoned on corruption charges for trying to buy a seat in Parliament.

Armistead's next notable patron was John Frederick Sackville, 3rd Duke of Dorset. She may have met the duke through her friendship with his maternal cousin, Richard FitzPatrick. Elizabeth Armistead was one of a number of celebrated courtesans kept by the duke over the years of his extended bachelorhood. It may have been from Lord Dorset that she acquired the leasehold of a house on Clarges Street that was to become her principal residence. Toward the end of their alliance in 1777, she appeared in two plays by George Coleman at the Haymarket Theatre. According to Town and Country, Dorset's patronage ceased abruptly when he embarked on an affair with the Countess of Derby. His desertion was reported to have caused Mrs Armistead a period of financial difficulty.

For a time, she spread her favours among several patrons including Lord George Cavendish, but soon the cuckolded Earl of Derby sought her favours. In the summer of 1778, the threat of French invasion sent Lord Derby to a militia camp in Winchester. George Selwyn wrote: "He does not, however, think his establishment complete without a declared mistress and he is therefore to take Mrs Armstead from Lord George that he may have the privilege of supporting her expenses entirely to himself." That autumn the earl set her up in a house in the quiet suburb of Hampstead Heath. Though the scandal magazines predicted their liaison might become a lasting one, Armistead elected to return to Lord George Cavendish, who provided her with her second annuity.

== High priestess of patriotism and royal mistress ==
Even as she supported herself with a string of wealthy lovers, Elizabeth Armistead maintained close friendships with the young politicians of the Whig party. When Richard Fitzpatrick was ordered to America with his regiment, she wrote letters to him enclosed in those of his friend Charles James Fox. Later, her drawing room at 46 Clarges Street became a meeting place for the Foxite Whigs.

It may have been through Fox and his friends that Armistead came to the notice of the Prince of Wales (the future George IV). Chafing for independence from his strict parents, the young prince had been drawn to Fox and his lively circle. A passionate affair with actress Mary Robinson had cooled, leaving him looking for a new mistress. According to Town and Country Magazine, the Prince spotted Mrs Armistead about town and directed his page to make approaches. Their first encounter was reported to have taken place at an inn near Bushy Park.

Mrs Robinson tried to rekindle the interest of her royal lover which the partisan newspapers of the day whipped up into a "severe contest" between the old mistress and the new. Because of her connection with the Opposition Whigs, Elizabeth Armistead came under attack from the pro-Administration press. Whatever cachet the title of royal mistress may have brought her, she soon discovered the Prince had neither the inclination nor the funds to support her in the style she had long maintained. After several months, she set off on an extended Continental Tour as a means of breaking off the affair without giving offence to the future king.

Shortly before going abroad, Mrs Armistead acquired the lease of a small country house in Surrey called St Ann's Hill. The place belonged to the estate of the Duke of Marlborough and probably came to her attention though his brother Lord Robert Spencer who was one of her Whig friends and a rumoured lover. For nearly a year, beginning in the summer of 1781, she toured the European continent with a string of titled patrons. Her former lover, Lord Derby, took her to Paris and then to Spa, Belgium. Later she was accompanied by the Earl of Cholmondeley to Italy, then by Lord Coleraine back to Paris. She returned to England to find the Whigs finally in power under Lord Rockingham and her friend Charles Fox in office as Foreign Secretary. After the death of Rockingham forced Fox to resign, he was rumoured to have had an affair with Mary Robinson before beginning one with his long-time friend Elizabeth Armistead.

== Mistress and wife of Charles Fox ==
It is not known what compelled Charles James Fox and Elizabeth Armistead to become lovers after nearly a decade of platonic friendship. Perhaps the newspaper gossip that he was involved with her rival courtesan, Mrs Robinson, may have made her see her old friend in a different light. The relationship likely began with the expectation on both their parts that it would be temporary, but it soon became clear that Fox was smitten with his new mistress. When her exclusive attachment to him put her into debt, she tried to break it off but Fox refused to hear of it. "You shall not go without me, wherever you go," he wrote. "I have examined myself and know that I can better abandon friends, country, everything than live without Liz."

They retired to St Ann's Hill where they lived quietly and simply. She sold her annuities and her houses in London to help pay down his debts. In 1785, she purchased the house and land from the Duke of Marlborough, who granted them a mortgage of £100 a year. Fox and Mrs Armistead had no children together but often had his nephew, Lord Holland, or his illegitimate children Harry Fox and Harriet Willoughby, to stay at St Ann's Hill. They also appear to have practically adopted young Robert St John, the grandson of Mrs Armistead's first keeper, Lord Bolingbroke. In 1795, after they had been together for more than ten years, Fox wrote to his nephew, "I think my affection for her increases every day. She is a comfort to me in every misfortune and makes me enjoy doubly every pleasant circumstance of life. There is to me a charm and delight in her society which time does not in the least wear off, and for real goodness of heart if she ever had an equal she certainly never had a superior."

Not long after Fox wrote so glowingly of his unsanctified union with Elizabeth Armistead, their relationship was threatened when she learned that banker Thomas Coutts hoped Fox would marry his favourite daughter, Frances. Not wanting to stand in the way of such an advantageous match for him, Mrs Armistead offered to step aside but Fox would not hear of it. "I cannot figure to myself any possible idea of happiness without you," he wrote, "and being sure of this is it possible that I can think of any trifling advantage of fortune or connection as weighing a feather in the scale against the whole comfort and happiness of my life?"

To prevent her worrying that he might wed someone else, and to secure her future should any harm befall him, Fox resolved to marry his mistress. Mrs Armistead understood what a scandal it would cause and insisted the marriage be kept secret. On 28 September 1795, the two were wed in the parish of Wyton by Rev. John Pery with her maid Mary Dassonville and the parson's clerk Jeremiah Bradshaw as witnesses. For the next seven years they continued to live happily, to all appearances as mistress and keeper.

In 1802, when they were about to embark on a trip to France where he would be honoured by Napoleon, Fox insisted on making the marriage public. The announcement caused some gossip and social awkwardness, but Mrs Fox was generally accepted. When Fox returned to office as Foreign Secretary in the Ministry of All the Talents, his wife managed the expected social obligations with aplomb that may have confounded her critics. "Mrs Fox is happy," wrote Lady Elizabeth Foster, "but has the most perfect good sense as well as good nature in her new situation."

Elizabeth and her husband had little time to enjoy her social triumph. In the summer of 1806, he grew very ill with dropsy, a symptom of his fatal liver disease, and died at Chiswick on 13 September 1806. The last word he spoke was her name. "If we had not known it before," wrote his nephew Lord Holland, "his last hours would have convinced us that the ruling passion of his heart was affection and tenderness for her."

== Statesman's respected widow ==
Though devastated by the death of her "angel", Mrs Fox returned to St Ann's Hill and continued the quiet, domestic life she had led with him. Out of loyalty to his memory and sincere affection for her his family and their circle of friends remained devoted to her. She often hosted company or paid visits to them. Following Fox's death, she was granted a pension of £1200 per year and in 1823 the King, George IV, granted his former mistress an annuity of £500 per year which was continued by his brother and later his niece, Queen Victoria.

Mrs Fox took a kind interest in the welfare of villagers from nearby Chertsey, subscribing to various charities and supporting a small school for the children of the parish. As the Victorian era dawned, the world conveniently forgot her notorious past. Instead she was regarded as one of the few remaining links with the Foxite Whigs, whose reforming zeal had finally begun to bear fruit. She died on 8 July 1842, within days of her ninety-second birthday. Her funeral took place at All Saints (now St Peter's) church in Chertsey. Her late husband's namesake great-nephew Colonel Charles Richard Fox was chief mourner together with his brother-in-law, Lord Lilford. As a token of respect, the Duke of Bedford sent an empty carriage to join the funeral cortege. "The ceremony was intended to be private," reported the Windsor and Eton Express, "but persons of all classes were anxious to show their respect for one who has been so long and justly beloved, and who by her urbanity, kindness, and excessive benevolence, has acquired the esteem of the inhabitants of the neighbourhood of her own residence, St Ann's Hill."

== Bibliography ==
- Davis, I. M. The Harlot and the Statesman. The Kendall Press, 1986
- Derry, John W. Charles James Fox. Batsford, 1972
- Genest, John. Some Accounts of the English Stage 1660–1830, 1832
- Hickman, Katie. Courtesans. Harper Collins, 2003
- Hicks, Carola. Improper Pursuits. Macmillan, 2001
- Jesse, John Heneage. George Selwyn and His Contemporaries. London, 1901
- Levy, Martin J. (2004). "Armitstead [née Cane; married name Fox], Elizabeth Bridget (1750–1842)". Oxford Dictionary of National Biography (online ed.). Oxford University Press. doi:10.1093/ref:odnb/47472. (Subscription, Wikipedia Library access or UK public library membership required.)
- Linnane, Fergus. Madams, Bawds and Brothel Keepers of London, Sutton Publishing, 2005
- Russell, Lord John. Memorials and Correspondence of Charles James Fox. 1853
- Reid, Loren Dudley. Charles James Fox, A Man for the People. Columbia, MO: University of Missouri Press, 1969.
- Sackville-West, Vita. Knole and the Sackvilles. Heinemann, 1934
- Toynbee, Mrs Paget. The Letters of Horace Walpole, fourth Earl of Oxford. Clarendon Press. 1903–1925
- Trevelyn, Sir George Otto. The Early History of Charles James Fox. 1811
- Trotter, John Bernard. Memoirs of the Latter Years of the Right Honourable Charles James Fox. London, 1811
