= Henry Fox, 4th Baron Holland =

British Whig politician and ambassador

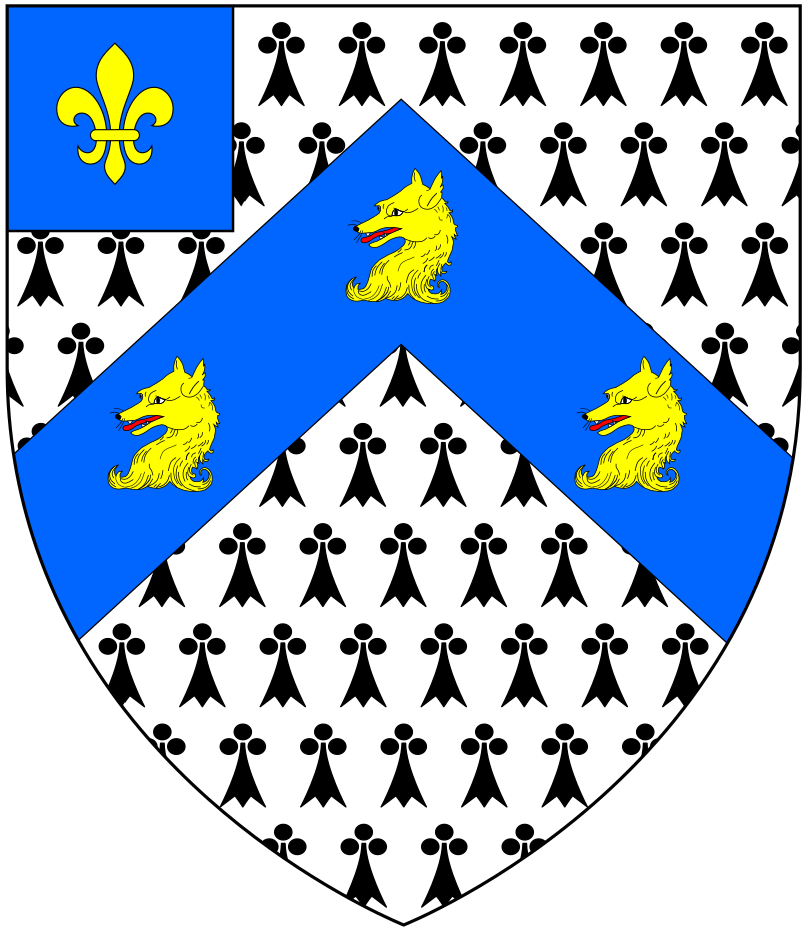
- Canting arms of Fox, Baron Holland: Ermine, on a chevron azure three fox's heads and necks erased or on a canton of the second a fleur-de-lys of the third

British Minister to Tuscany
- In office 1839–1846

Member of Parliament for Horsham
- In office 1826-1827

Personal details
- Born: 7 May 1802 London, England
- Died: 18 December 1859 (aged 57) Naples, Italy
- Party: Whig
- Spouse: Mary Coventry (m. 1833)
- Children: 4, including Marie
- Parents: Henry Vassall-Fox (father); Elizabeth Vassall (mother)
- Relatives: Charles Fox (brother)
- Education: Christ Church, Oxford

Henry Edward Fox, 4th Baron Holland of Holland, 4th Baron Holland of Foxley (7 May 1802 – 18 December 1859) was briefly a British Whig politician and later an ambassador.

== Early life ==
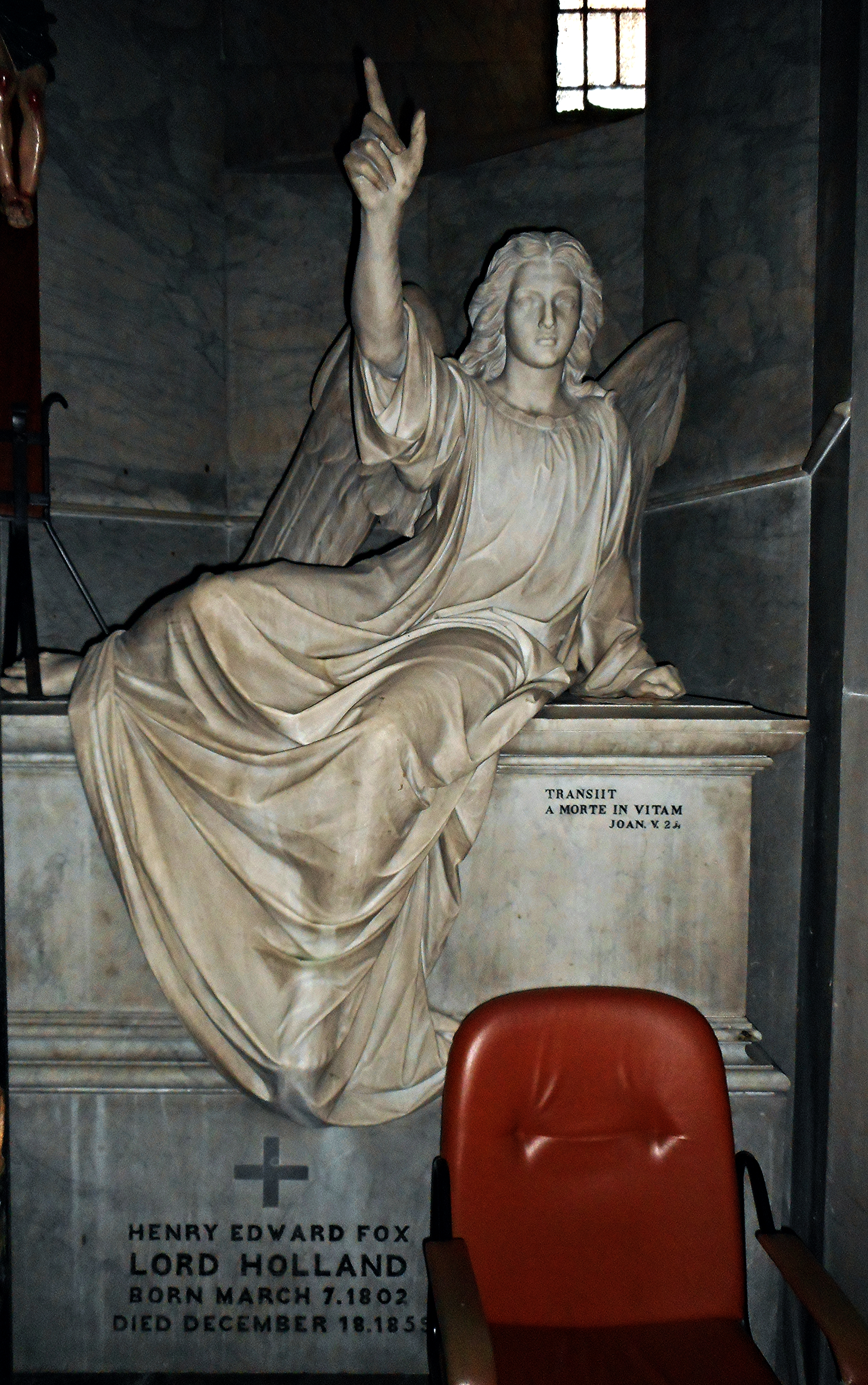
Monument to Henry Fox, 4th Baron Holland, San Giuseppe a Chiaia Church, Naples

Fox was born at Holland House, London, the eldest legitimate child of the 3rd Baron Holland and his wife, Elizabeth Vassall, and was educated at Christ Church, Oxford.

== Career ==
Selections from the entertaining journal, Fox kept from 1818 to 1830 were published in 1923, edited by his cousin and eventual heir Lord Ilchester (The Journal of the Hon. Henry Edward Fox). In it, he records his life in British high society and his travels, his encounters with such notables as Talleyrand, Samuel Rodgers, Sydney Smith and Lord Byron (and Byron's mistress, Teresa Guiccioli, with whom Fox had an affair which he recounts in some detail).

Fox briefly held the seat of Horsham from 1826 to 1827 before joining the Diplomatic Service in 1831, after which he was Secretary to the Legation at Turin from 1832 to 1835, Attaché at St Petersburg, Secretary at the Embassy in Vienna from 1835 1838, to the German Confederation in 1838, and to Florence from 1839 to 1846.

== Marriage and progeny ==
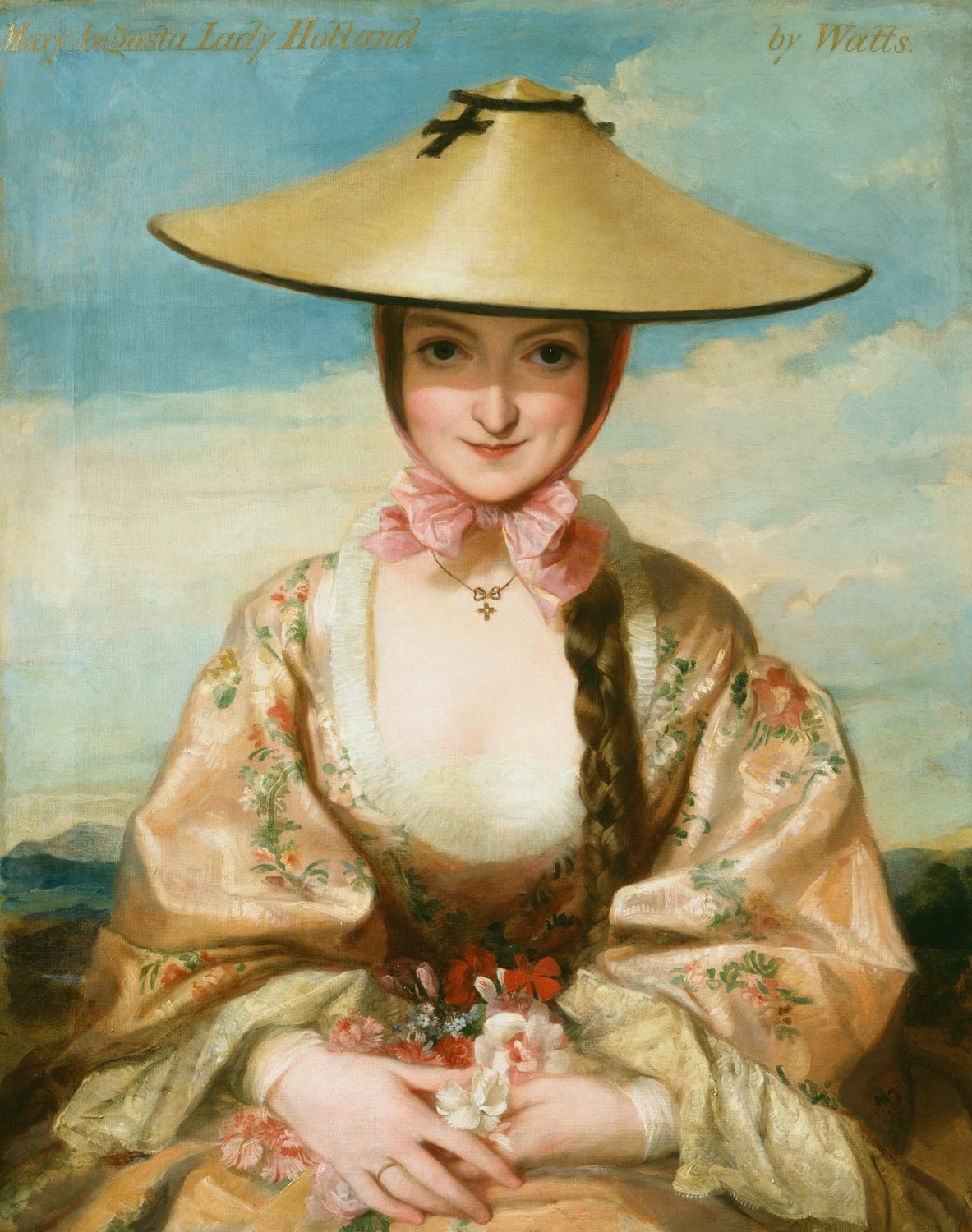
Portrait of Lady Holland by George Frederic Watts, between c. 1843 and c. 1844, part of the Royal Collection

On 9 May 1833, Fox married Lady Mary Augusta Coventry (11 May 1812 – 23 September 1889), a daughter of George Coventry, 8th Earl of Coventry, by whom he had three children, who all died as infants:

- Stillborn son (10 October 1838).
- A son (born and died 7 March 1842).
- Stillborn daughter (8 August 1844).

== Adopted daughter ==
Unable to have surviving offspring, they adopted a 3 month old girl born in France, Marie Fox, later Princess of Liechtenstein, the wife of Prince Louis of Liechtenstein. Her mother's name was given as Frenchwoman Victoire Magny of Soissons, but the identity of her father was unspecified. She was baptised at the Church of St. Augustine as Marie Henriette Adélaïde. When she was three months old, she was found by a physician called Dr. Séguin, who arranged for her to be adopted by Henry Edward Fox, 4th Baron Holland, and his wife, the former Lady Mary Augusta Coventry. Lord and Lady Holland had no biological children of their own, having gone through two stillbirths and one short-lived child. Lady Holland was in her late thirties and Lord Holland insisted on adopting the girl. Her biological paternity remains a mystery; one rumour had it that she was her adoptive father's biological daughter born by his servant. She wrote a two-volume history of Holland House, published in 1874.

As Lord Holland died without male issue, in Naples, his titles became extinct.

Parliament of the United Kingdom
Preceded by Robert Hurst; Sir John Aubrey, Bt	Member of Parliament for Horsham; 1826–1827; With: Robert Hurst	Succeeded by Robert Hurst; Nicholas Ridley-Colborne
Diplomatic posts
Preceded by Hon. Ralph Abercromby as Minister Resident	British Minister to Tuscany; 1839–1846	Succeeded by Sir George Hamilton
Peerage of Great Britain
Preceded by Henry Vassall-Fox	Baron Holland (of Holland); Baron Holland (of Foxley); 1840–1859	Extinct
