= Elizabeth Fox, Baroness Holland =

English political hostess

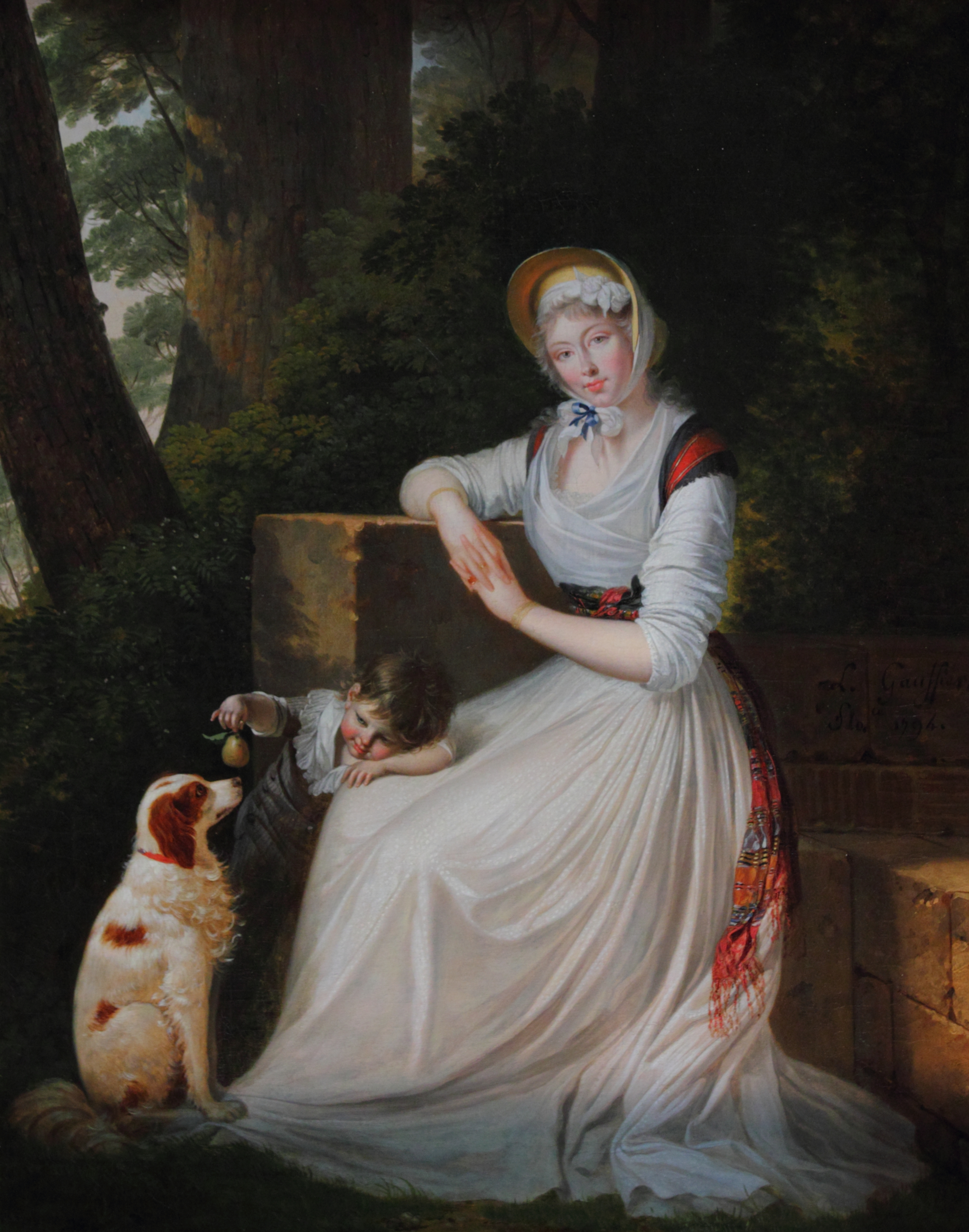
Elizabeth Webster, by Louis Gauffier (1794)

Elizabeth Vassall Fox, Baroness Holland (1771 – London, November 1845) was an English political hostess and the wife of Whig politician Henry Vassall-Fox, 3rd Baron Holland. With her husband, and after his death, she hosted political and literary gatherings at their home, Holland House.

== Biography ==
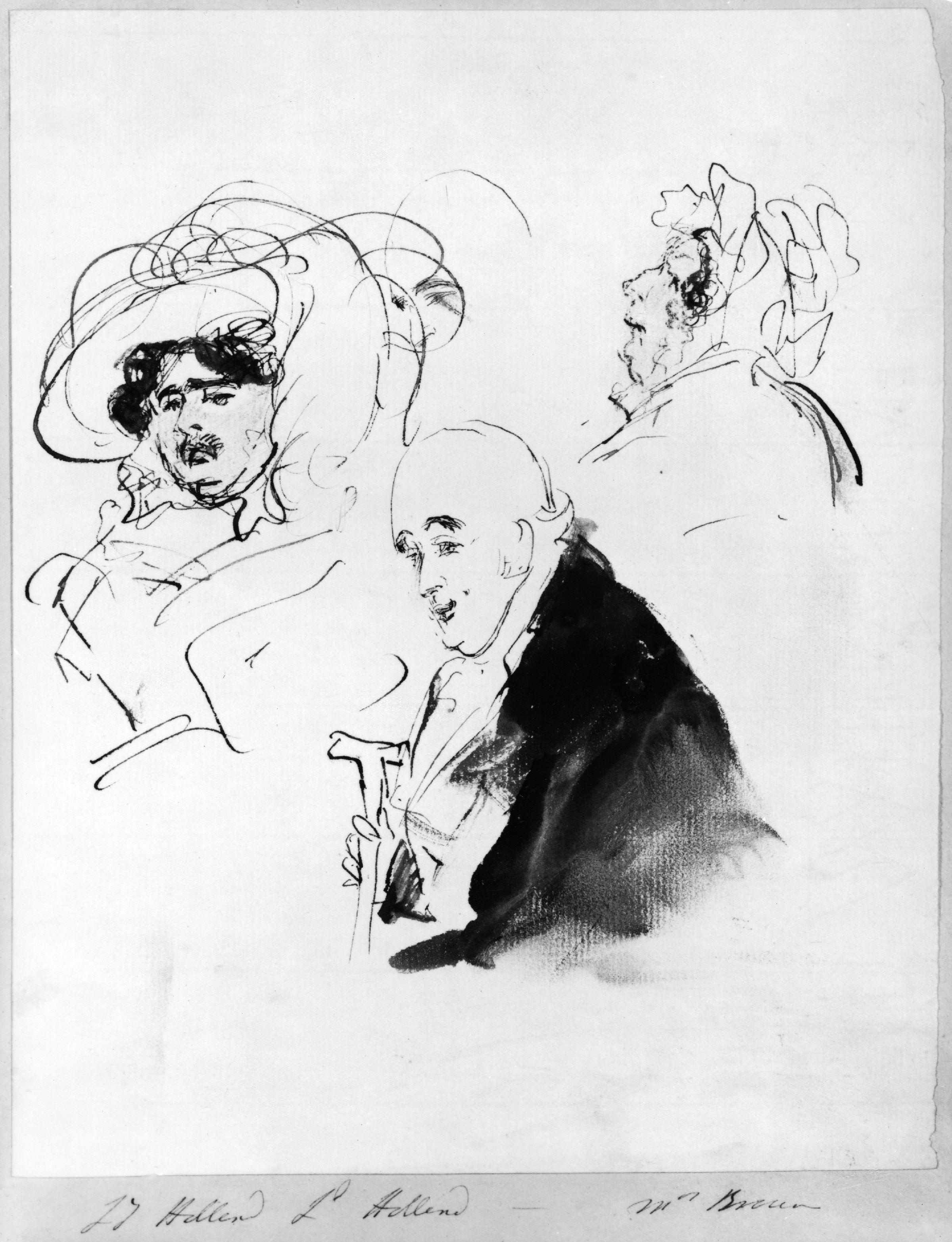
Elizabeth Vassall Fox, Lady Holland; Henry Richard Vassall Fox, 3rd Baron Holland; Mrs Brown, portrait by Sir Edwin Henry Landseer

Elizabeth Vassall was born in 1771 in London, the only child and heiress of Richard Vassall, a planter in Jamaica, and Mary Clarke of New York. She was the granddaughter of Florentius Vassall, a wealthy planter and slave-owner, in Jamaica whose last will was dated 1777. She was also the first cousin of New York poet, scholar and real estate developer Clement Clarke Moore and second cousin of Theodosia Burr Alston, daughter of Aaron Burr.

=== First marriage ===
Vassall married Sir Godfrey Webster, 4th Baronet in 1786. He was more than 20 years older than she was. They had five children:

- Sir Godfrey Vassall Webster, 5th Baronet (6 October 1789 – 17 July 1836).
- A son (born and died 1790).
- Lt. Col. Sir Henry Vassall Webster (1793–1847).
- Lady Harriet Frances Webster (1794 – 7 August 1849), married on 5 June 1816 Hon. Adm. Sir Fleetwood Broughton Reynolds Pellew.
- A son (born and died October 1795).

Webster was intensely unhappy in her marriage and she spent much of the early 1790s travelling in Europe, visiting France, Germany, Switzerland, and Italy. She enjoyed the guidance and friendship of the Duchess of Devonshire and the politician Thomas Pelham, with whom she had an affair resulting in a daughter, Harriet Frances (b.1794).

=== Second marriage ===
In 1794, Webster met in Naples the Whig politician Henry Fox, 3rd Baron Holland, two years her junior, and they embarked on a love affair. They had seven children:

- General Charles Richard Fox (6 November 1796 – 13 April 1873). Born before the marriage of his parents.
- The Hon. Stephen Fox (18 January 1799 – 22 November 1800).
- A son (born and died 17 March 1801).
- Henry Edward Fox, 4th Baron Holland (7 May 1802 – 18 December 1859).
- The Hon. Mary Elizabeth Fox (19 February 1806 – 7 December 1891), married on 24 May 1830 Thomas Powys, 3rd Baron Lilford.
- The Hon. Georgiana Anne Fox (7 November 1809 – 31 October 1819).
- A daughter (born and died 24 June 1812).

On 4 July 1797, Fox was divorced by Webster on the grounds of adultery. She married Holland two days later, on 6 July. They lived together in Holland House in Kensington, then just outside London, and for many years hosted the elite of Whig society. Visitors included Lord Grey, George Tierney, Samuel Rogers, Walter Scott, Ugo Foscolo, Sydney Smith, and Richard Brinsley Sheridan.

Holland became known by her guests and contemporary observers for her domineering nature, in contrast to her husband. In his journals, Sydney Smith, a friend of both Lord and Lady Holland, called her a "formidable woman". Actress Fanny Kemble visited Holland House with her sister Adelaide Kemble and described what she called the "domineering rudeness" of Lady Holland. Lady Holland's rule extended not only to all of the guests at Holland House but to Lord Holland too. She dictated when he should go to bed, what he should wear, and would have servants take him away from the table in his wheelchair when he was in the middle of telling a story.

Both Lord and Lady Holland were great admirers of Napoleon Bonaparte. In 1815, Holland commissioned a bronze bust of him from the sculptor Antonio Canova, which was placed in the garden at Holland House. After Napoleon was exiled to Saint Helena in 1815, Lady Holland sent him supplies of food and hundreds of books. Napoleon remembered Lady Holland in his will and following his death, in 1821, his companions General Henri Gratien Bertrand and the Marquis de Montholon arrived at Holland House, delivering a snuffbox. The gold snuffbox, which had been a gift to Napoleon from Pope Pius VI, was later bequeathed by Lady Holland to the British Museum.

Lord Holland died on 22 October 1840. After his death, Lady Holland lived at 33 South Street, a property she had inherited from her mother. She continued to entertain, and it was here that the historian John Allen died in 1843. In November of that year, Holland moved to 9 Great Stanhope Street, a property she rented from Lord Palmerston.

Lady Holland died in 1845. By the end of her life, she had become estranged from her children. She supposedly said to Lord John Russell, 'I hate my son, I don't like my daughter'. In his Memoirs, diarist Charles Greville called Lady Holland "a social light which illuminated and adorned England, and even Europe, for half a century".

== Introduction of the dahlia ==
Lady Holland became known for permanently introducing the dahlia to the United Kingdom. An unsuccessful attempt had been made in 1789 by the Marchioness of Bute who brought the plant from Spain but failed to propagate it. Whilst in Madrid in 1804, Lady Holland was given either dahlia seeds or roots by the botanist Antonio José Cavanilles. She sent them back to England, to Lord Holland's librarian Mr Buonaiuti at Holland House, who successfully raised the plants. In 1824, Lord Holland sent his wife a note containing the following verse:

"The dahlia you brought to our isle

Your praises for ever shall speak;
Mid gardens as sweet as your smile,

And in colour as bright as your cheek."
