= Charles Richard Fox =

British Army general

General Charles Richard Fox

Surveyor-General of the Ordnance
- In office 1832–1834; 1841; 1846-1852

Member of Parliament for Tower Hamlets
- In office 1841–1847

Member of Parliament for Stroud
- In office 1835

Member of Parliament for Tavistock
- In office 1832–1835

Member of Parliament for Calne
- In office 1831–1832

Personal details
- Born: 6 November 1796
- Died: 13 April 1873 (aged 76)
- Party: Whig
- Spouse: Mary FitzClarence (m. 1824)
- Parents: Henry Vassall-Fox (father); Elizabeth Vassall (mother)
- Relatives: Henry Fox (brother)
- Military career
- Service: British Army
- Rank: General
- Units: Grenadiers
- Commands: 57th (West Middlesex) Regiment of Foot

General Charles Richard Fox (6 November 1796 – 13 April 1873) was a British army general, and later a politician.

== Background ==
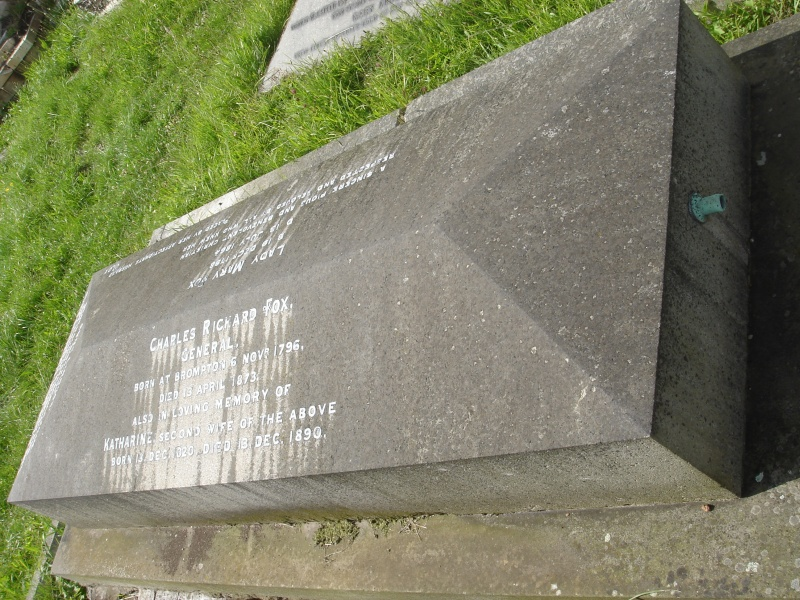
Funerary monument, Kensal Green Cemetery, London

Fox was born at Brompton, the illegitimate son of Henry Richard Vassall-Fox, 3rd Baron Holland, through a liaison with Lady Webster, whom Lord Holland would later marry.

== Career ==
After some service in the Royal Navy, Fox entered the Grenadiers, and was known in later life as a collector of Greek coins. His collection was bought for the royal museum of Berlin when he died in 1873. He was present around the time of Napoleon's incarceration on St Helena and subsequently removed a key to the bedroom where Napoleon was lodged. This was given to his mother - Lady Holland - due to her Napoleonphile attitudes and auctioned in 2021. He married in St. George's, Hanover Square, London, on 19 June 1824 Lady Mary FitzClarence, a daughter of William IV by his mistress Dorothy Jordan. The couple had no issue.

Fox was also a politician. He represented the Whig interest and sat for Calne 1831–32, then Tavistock 1832–35. He briefly represented Stroud in 1835, but resigned that seat so Lord John Russell could contest it. He was elected as a Member of Parliament for the east London constituency of Tower Hamlets in 1841 and served until 1847.

Fox was Surveyor-General of the Ordnance in 1841 and 1846–52. He was promoted Major-General on 9 November 1846, Lieutenant-General on 20 June 1854, and General on 6 March 1863.

Parliament of the United Kingdom
Preceded by Sir James Macdonald; Thomas Babington Macaulay	Member of Parliament for Calne; 1831–1832; With: Thomas Babington Macaulay	Succeeded by Earl of Kerry
Preceded by John Heywood Hawkins; Francis Russell	Member of Parliament for Tavistock; 1832–1835; With: Lord Russell	Succeeded by Lord Russell; John Rundle
Preceded by William Henry Hyett; George Poulett Scrope	Member of Parliament for Stroud; 1835; With: George Poulett Scrope	Succeeded by George Poulett Scrope; Lord John Russell
Preceded by Stephen Lushington; Sir William Clay	Member of Parliament for Tower Hamlets; 1841–1847; With: Sir William Clay	Succeeded by Sir William Clay; George Thompson
Military offices
Preceded by William Leader Maberly	Surveyor-General of the Ordnance; 1832–1834	Succeeded by Lord Edward Somerset
Preceded by Sir Rufane Shaw Donkin	Surveyor-General of the Ordnance; 1841	Succeeded by Jonathan Peel
Preceded by Jonathan Peel	Surveyor-General of the Ordnance; 1846–1852	Succeeded by Sir George Berkeley
Preceded by Sir James Frederick Love	Colonel of the 57th (West Middlesex) Regiment of Foot; 1865–1873	Succeeded by Freeman Murray
