= James Campbell (British Army officer, died 1831) =

Scottish officer (1745–1831)

Sir James Campbell
- Born: James Callander; 8 October 1745; Ardkinglas Castle, Argyll and Bute, Scotland
- Died: 21 May 1831 (aged 85); France
- Education: Edinburgh High School
- Spouses: Catherine Forbes (m. 1769; died 1771) Harriet Dutens (m. 1772; died 1772) Lady Elizabeth MacDonnell (m. 1777; died 1796) Melle Descot (m. 1815)
- Children: Caroline Henrietta Sheridan

Sir James Campbell (né Callander) (8 October 1745 – 21 May 1831) was a Scottish officer of the British Army, and author of Memoirs of Sir James Campbell of Ardkinglas, written by Himself. Until 1810 he was known as James Callander. While not a baronet, as he claimed, he used the title "Sir". Campbell was 5th Laird of Craigforth and 15th Laird of Ardkinglas.

== Early life ==
Campbell was the eldest son of John Callander of Craigforth, by his wife Mary, daughter of Sir James Livingston of Glentirran and Dalderse, he was born at Ardkinglas Castle on 21 October (O.S.) 1745. James was educated at Edinburgh High School and under a private tutor.

== Career ==
In 1759 James Callander, as he then was, joined the 51st regiment as ensign, and served in the Seven Years' War. After 1763 he was in Ireland and Minorca, returning to Scotland in 1789. He ran into financial troubles, and his cousin Sir Alexander Livingston-Campbell of Ardkinglas had him imprisoned for debt, as he believed that Callander had not voted for him in the election and had voted for Callander's friend Sir Thomas Dundas. In fact, James Callander had voted for his cousin.

Taking work abroad, under Sir John Acton, 6th Baronet, Callander was inspector-general of troops at Naples. At the request of Lord Nelson, Callander claimed, he went to the Ionian Islands to confirm the inhabitants in their attachment to the English cause. This authority was thought by some to be fictitious, however. He remained there till the Peace of Amiens in 1802.

On succeeding in 1810 to the estate of his cousin Sir Alexander Livingston-Campbell of Ardkinglas, Callander adopted the name of Campbell. He also used the title of baronet to which he was not entitled, the Campbell baronetcy of 1679 having terminated with his cousin's death in 1752. However, his claim to the Livingston baronetcy of 1685 was legitimate, as it was merely dormant.

== Personal life ==
Campbell was four times married and left a large family. His first wife was Catherine Forbes, the youngest daughter of George Forbes, Esq. of Hitchener Hall, Surrey, they were married in 1769 in Geneva. Before her death in 1771, they were the parents of:

- George Callander (1770–1824), who married Elizabeth-Crompton Erskine, eldest daughter of Lord Advocate Hon. Henry Erskine (brother of the 11th Earl of Buchan and of Lord Chancellor Thomas Erskine) in 1801.
- Mary Callander, who married Capt. Lucius O'Brien, cousin of Sir Lucius O'Brien, Bt of Dromoland.

His second wife was Harriet Dutens, the daughter of Peter Dutens, jeweller to the Prince of Wales, they were married in 1772. Before her death, they were parents of one daughter:

- Elizbaeth Callander (b. 1772), who married Capt. George Dashwood; after his death she married Richard Magenis, MP for Enniskillen.

In 1777, he married his third wife, Lady Elizabeth MacDonnell, the daughter of Alexander MacDonnell, 5th Earl of Antrim. Before her death in 1796, they were the parents of:

- Alexander James Callander (b. 1779), a Major with the 91st Regiment who died unmarried.
- Georgina Callander (d. 1839), who died unmarried.
- Caroline Henrietta Callander (1779–1851), a novelist who married Thomas Sheridan, the son of the Right Hon. Richard Brinsley Sheridan and his wife Elizabeth Ann Linley, in 1805.
- Randall William Callander (1785–1858), who married Miss Wilson and eventually inherited his father's estate.
- Frances "Fanny" Callander (1793–1857), who married the Right Hon. Sir James Graham, 2nd Baronet of Netherby in 1819.

Campbell's fourth wife was Melle Descot, the daughter of his Paris banker, they were married in 1815.

Campbell died in France on 1831.

=== Relationship with Sassen ===
When resident in Paris, Campbell made the acquaintance of a French woman, Lina Talina Sassen. Being detained by the order of Napoleon, he supposedly sent her as his commissioner to Scotland, designating her in the power of attorney with which he furnished her as his "beloved wife". On his return to Scotland he declined to recognise the relationship, and she raised an action against him in the court of session. Although the marriage was found not proven, she was awarded a sum of £300. per annum. On appeal to the House of Lords the award was withheld, and Sassen continued to bring legal actions against him, being allowed to sue in formâ pauperis. A daughter had been born to them, around 1813.

=== Descendants ===
Through his daughter Caroline, he was a grandfather of politician Richard Brinsley Sheridan and the three beauties,’ Helen Blackwood, Baroness Dufferin and Claneboye; the feminist Caroline Norton; and Georgiana Seymour, Duchess of Somerset.

Through his son Randall, he was a grandfather of Henrietta Callendar, Elizabeth Callender (1818–1876), who married Michael Linning Melville in 1840; Margaret Callender (1816–1897), who married James Campbell Macarthur (son of Hannibal Hawkins Macarthur) in 1851.

Through his daughter Frances, he was the grandfather of Sir Frederick Graham, 3rd Baronet and Mabel Violet, Countess Feversham, wife of William Duncombe, 1st Earl of Feversham and the great grandfather of Margaret Frances Grimston, Countess of Verulam, wife of James Grimston, 3rd Earl of Verulam, of Sibyl Marcia Milnes, Baroness Houghton, wife of Robert Crewe-Milnes, 1st Marquess of Crewe, of Violet Hermione Graham, Duchess of Montrose, of Hilda Georgina Faber, Baroness Wittenham, wife of Denison Faber, 1st Baron Wittenham, of Lady Ulrica Duncombe, wife of Everard Baring, of William Duncombe, Viscount Helmsley, of Hermione Wilhelmina FitzGerald, Duchess of Leinster, of Helen Venetia Vincent, Viscountess D'Abernon and of Lady Mabel Cynthia Duncombe, who married her cousin, Sir Richard James Graham, 4th Baronet.
