= Caroline Sheridan =

Caroline Sheridan may refer to:

- Caroline Norton (1808–1877), née Sheridan, English social reformer and author
- Caroline Henrietta Sheridan (1779–1851), English novelist
