= Sir Frederick Graham, 3rd Baronet =

British diplomat, soldier and landowner

Sir Frederick Graham Bt JP DL
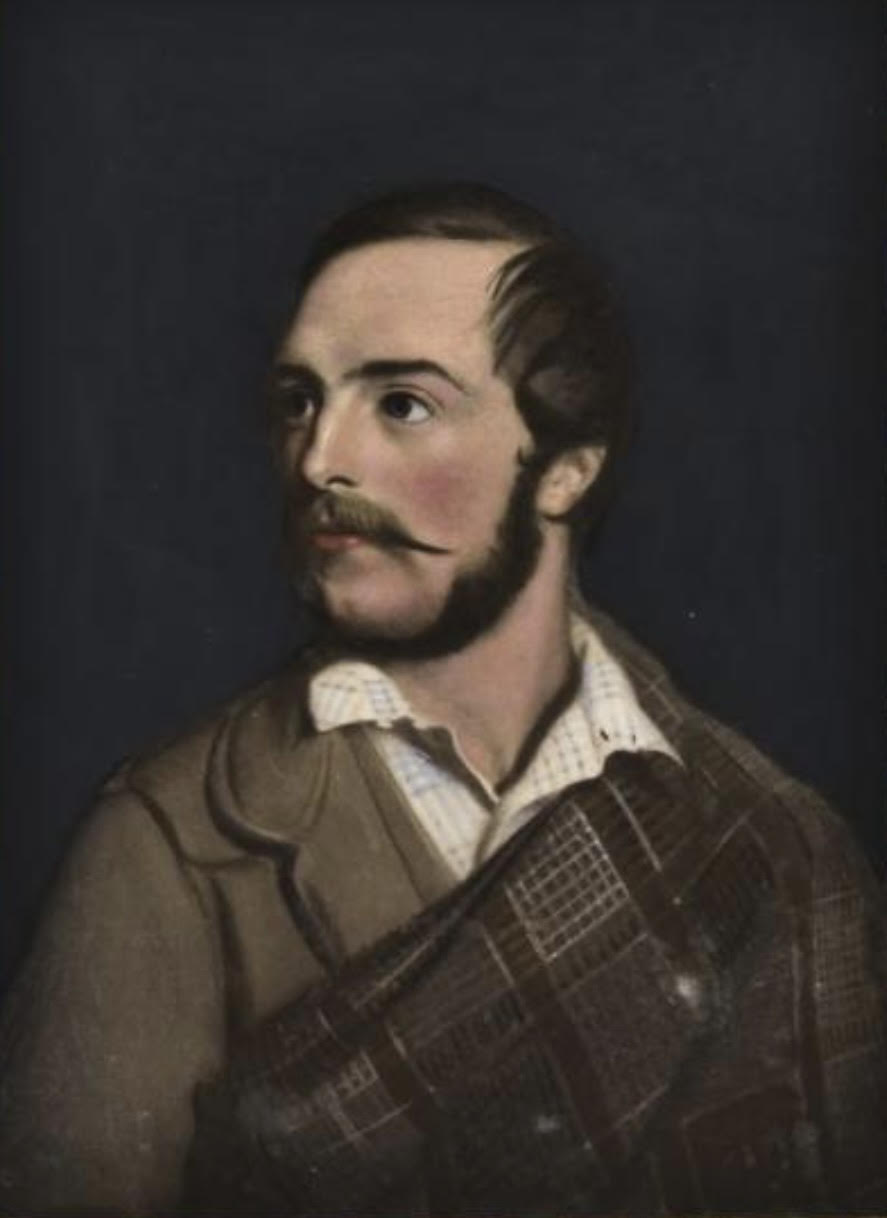
- Portrait during his Canadian expedition, 1847

High Sheriff of Cumberland
- In office 1866–1867
- Preceded by: William Postlethwaite
- Succeeded by: William Edward James

Personal details
- Born: Frederick Ulric Graham; 2 April 1820
- Died: 8 March 1888 (aged 67) London, England
- Spouse: Lady Jane Hermione Seymour (m. 1852)
- Relations: Sir James Graham, 1st Baronet (grandfather); Sir James Campbell (grandfather)
- Children: 8, including Violet Graham, Duchess of Montrose
- Parent(s): Sir James Graham, 2nd Baronet; Fanny Callander

Sir Frederick Ulric Graham, 3rd Baronet of Netherby, JP, DL (2 April 1820 – 8 March 1888) was a British diplomat, soldier and landowner.

== Early life ==
The scion of an old Scots family seated at Netherby Hall, Frederick Ulric was born on 2 April 1820. He was the eldest son of Fanny Callander and Sir James Graham, 2nd Baronet, the British statesman who served as Home Secretary and First Lord of the Admiralty. A notable ancestor was Richard Graham, 1st Viscount Preston. He was a brother to Constance Helena Graham, Mabel Violet (wife of William Duncombe, 1st Earl of Feversham), Rev. Reginald Malise Graham, Helen Graham and James Stanley Graham.

His paternal grandparents were Sir James Graham, 1st Baronet and Lady Catherine Stewart (eldest daughter of John Stewart, 7th Earl of Galloway). His maternal grandparents were Col. Sir James Callander of Ardkinglas and Lady Elizabeth Helena McDonnell (a daughter of Alexander McDonnell, 5th Earl of Antrim).

== Career ==
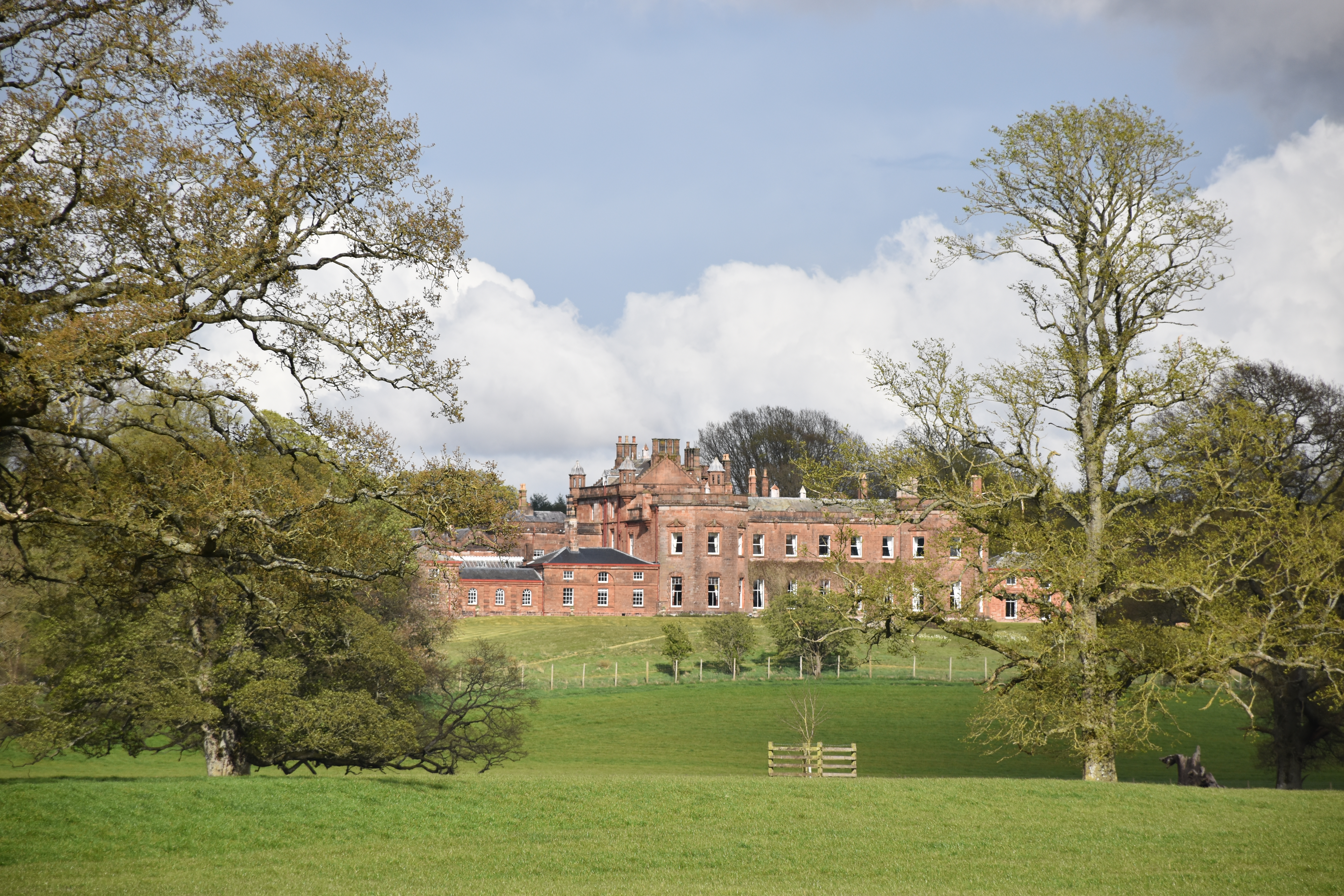
Netherby Hall

Graham was a Cornet in the 1st Life Guards and a captain in the Westmorland Yeomanry Cavalry. Entering the Diplomatic service, he served as attaché to Vienna in 1842 while his father was Home Secretary. In 1847, he travelled on a hunting expedition across western Canada, documented in Notes of a Sporting Expedition in the Far West of Canada (published posthumously by Lady Graham in 1898).

Upon his father's death on 25 October 1861, he succeeded as the 3rd Baronet Graham, of Netherby, Cumberland. He qualified as a magistrate for the county of Cumberland in 1861, served as Deputy Lieutenant and Justice of the Peace for Cumberland, and High Sheriff of Cumberland in 1866.

== Personal life ==
In 1852, Graham married his first cousin once removed, Lady Jane Hermione Seymour, daughter of Edward St Maur, 12th Duke of Somerset and his wife Jane Georgiana Sheridan – the Eglinton 'Queen of Beauty'. His mother, Lady Graham, and Lady Hermione's grandmother, Caroline Henrietta Sheridan, were sisters, daughters of Sir James Campbell of Craigforth and Ardkinglas, born Callander. Together, they were the parents of:

- Margaret Frances Graham (1857–1927), who married Alexander Æneas Mackintosh, 27th Chief of Clan Mackintosh in 1875. After his death, she married James Grimston, 3rd Earl of Verulam in 1878.
- Violet Hermione Graham, Duchess of Montrose (1854–1940), who married Douglas Graham, 5th Duke of Montrose in 1876.
- Sibyl Marcia Graham (1857–1887), who married Robert Crewe-Milnes, 2nd Baron Houghton (later 1st Marquess of Crewe) in 1880.
- Sir Richard James Graham, 4th Baronet (1859–1932), who married his cousin, Olivia Baring, sister of Sir Godfrey Baring, 1st Baronet. After her death in 1887, he married his first cousin, Lady Mabel Cynthia Duncombe, a daughter of William Duncombe, 1st Earl of Feversham. After her death in 1926 he married his younger brother's widow, Florence Rose Wood.
- Hilda Georgina Graham (1859–1946), who married George Faber, 1st Baron Wittenham.
- Hugh Graham (1860–1921), who married American heiress Jessie Low, a daughter of Andrew Low of Savannah, Georgia, and sister in law to Juliette Gordon Low, in 1888.
- James Reginald Graham (1864–1910), who married Florence Rose (née Wood), a daughter of J. Carter Wood and widow of Capt. Cyprian Knollys.

Sir Frederick died at his London residence, 40 Park Lane, on 8 March 1888. Lady Jane died on 4 April 1909.

=== Descendants ===
Through his eldest daughter's first marriage, he was a grandfather of Eva Hermione Mackintosh (1876–1934), who married Sir Godfrey Baring, 1st Baronet (the brother of her uncle's first wife Olivia).

Through his son Hugh, he was posthumously a grandfather to Alastair Hugh Graham (1904–1982), an Oxford friend of Evelyn Waugh who was considered an inspiration for Sebastian Flyte in Brideshead Revisited.

Baronetage of Great Britain
Preceded by James Robert George Graham	Baronet (of Netherby); 1861–1888	Succeeded by Richard James Graham
