= Ferdinand St Maur, Earl St Maur =

British aristocrat and soldier (1835–1869)

- Baron Seymour
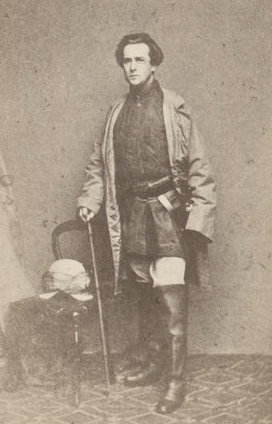
- Ferdinand Seymour, photograph c.1861
- Tenure: 1863–1869
- Predecessor: Edward St Maur, 12th Duke of Somerset
- Successor: Edward St Maur, 12th Duke of Somerset
- Born: 17 July 1835
- Died: 30 September 1869 (aged 34)
- Partner: Rosina Swan; 1866-1869 (his death)
- Issue: Ruth St Maur; Lt. Col. Harold St Maur
- Father: Edward St Maur, 12th Duke of Somerset
- Mother: Jane Georgiana Sheridan

Edward Adolphus Ferdinand Seymour, Earl St. Maur, suo jure 13th Baron Seymour (17 July 1835 – 30 September 1869) was a British aristocrat and soldier. He was the heir to the duchy of Somerset from his grandfather's death in 1855, but did not succeed due to his early death in London, aged 34.

== Background ==
He was the eldest son of Edward Seymour, 12th Duke of Somerset, and Georgiana Sheridan, the daughter of soldier Thomas Sheridan, and one of three sisters, which also produced the author and social reformer Caroline Norton. He was styled Lord Seymour until 1863 when his father was created Earl St Maur, of Berry Pomeroy, and he adopted his father's new creation as a courtesy title. He was known throughout his life by his middle name, Ferdinand, and commonly nicknamed Ferdy. He matriculated at Christ Church, Oxford in 1853. Seymour attended the 1856 coronation of Alexander II of Russia, as attaché to Lord Granville.

== Military career ==
Seymour was commissioned into the Royal Wiltshire Yeomanry Cavalry as a cornet in 1856. He briefly served as a volunteer on the staff in the Anglo-Persian War (1855–1857), alongside Lord Schomberg Kerr and Ulick de Burgh, Lord Dunkellin, and was assigned by James Outram to work with his Political Secretary Robert Lewis Taylor (c.1821–1905) of the Bombay Native Infantry. Shortly afterwards, he was at the Relief of Lucknow during the Indian Rebellion (1857–1858). His gallantry was recognised by Sir Colin Campbell.

Back in England, Seymour commanded the 1st Buckinghamshire Rifle Volunteer Corps. He also was a cornet in the 4th Dragoon Guards. He resigned his Guards commission at the beginning of 1860, and positions of Captain Commandant in the Wiltshire militia by June 1860.

Seymour went to Italy a civilian volunteer in 1860, and joined Giuseppe Garibaldi's Esercito Meridionale (Southern Army) as a private soldier. He assumed the rank of captain on the basis of his British militia rank; and called himself by the pseudonym "Captain Richard Sarsfield". He distinguished himself in the Battle of Volturnus in October of that year. Garibaldi later confirmed his rank of Captain, by November.

== Scott affair ==
In 1860, Seymour horsewhipped Charles Alexander Scott of Garibaldi's forces in the Kingdom of the Two Sicilies. Court cases followed.

=== Captain Scott ===
Seymour's victim, known as Captain Scott for military purposes, was Karl Blumenthal, British-born in London in 1803. He had spent much time in Italy, where he used the name Carlo Alessandro Scott or Blumenthal. He died in 1866. (While he was in some way connected to the noted Blumenthal Jewish merchant family of Venice, to which Olga Blumenthal belonged, nothing definite seems to be known, according to the dissertation of Emilia Peatini.)

Blumenthal's mother was reported to be Venetian, and he was involved in Daniele Manin's struggle on behalf of the Venetian Republic of San Marco, sent from the staff of Guglielmo Pepe. He also defended the Roman Republic of 1849 against Austria, which he did as deputy to Garibaldi. He sought in 1860 to involve himself in the Mortara case by an expedition to Rome, that later came to nothing. A contemporary account of his efforts on behalf of the Hunters of the Alps is in Les Chasseurs des Alpes et des Apennins (1860) by Louis de La Varenne.

=== Context ===
Seymour was Military Secretary under Colonel John Whitehead Peard of the British Legion by October 1860. Seymour, according to some accounts, accused a brother officer of embezzling funds. The officer challenged Seymour to a duel, that Peard forbade him to attend,

Bacchin writes:

"... in a public letter, Captain Scott accused both Peard and Captain Sarffield, who was the brigade secretary, of 'stirring things up, making things up, and slandering'. This caused riots and police mobilization in the centre of Naples."

=== British Legion background ===
George Holyoake, organiser in London of the Legion, wrote in his memoirs that "There being no legal power to enforce order was the cardinal weakness of the British Legion." On its arrival in Palermo, bogus commissions caused confusion, and there were "Captain Sarsfield, Colonel Peard known as "Garibaldi's Englishman," De Rohan, Captain Scott, and others on the spot, with colourable pretensions to authority".

It was argued at the time that Scott and "an Italian" who used the name Captain Hugh Forbes were interfering with the British Legion's effectiveness, as outsiders. Forbes, like Scott, was of British birth, had lived in Italy for a long period, and was a veteran of the 1848–9 conflicts. After a period in the United States, he had recruited in the United Kingdom a multinational group for Garibaldi with support from George W. M. Reynolds. Forbes's candidate for commander of the British Legion, called Hicks, had been thrown out of the party before it sailed from Harwich by William James Linton, accused of financial irregularity. At the end of October, Forbes was trying to attract further support for his brigade stationed at Resina, from the British Legion, with support from Scott.

=== Scott's account ===
In a pamphlet of 1863, Scott gave his own version of events:

Seymour objected to a payment to an English army contractor, who applied to Scott. Scott looked at the paperwork, and sided with the contractor. Seymour insulted Scott, who "had no alternative but to request an explanation". He had no intention of fighting a duel.

Seymour insisted they fight with swords. Scott came to the place appointed for the duel, but Seymour did not, citing Peard's veto on the duel. Seymour later laid in wait with accomplices for Scott, and beat him.

=== Aftermath ===
The contractor was named by Scott as S. Isaac, Campbell & Co.; Scott said he had met Samuel Isaac in Naples, in October. Isaac wrote a conciliatory letter, published in the Army and Navy Gazette of 15 December 1860, referring to the assault as "an old man beaten over the head with a hunting crop".

Seymour associated at this time in Naples with Laurence Oliphant and stayed with Lady Holland, widow of Henry Fox, 4th Baron Holland. He returned to London around the end of November 1860.

The civil action Scott v Lord Seymour for tort (assault and false imprisonment) in the Court of Exchequer was argued in April and May 1862, with judgement for the plaintiff Scott. In December 1862 an appeal on the conflict of laws aspect of the case upheld the judgement. Seymour paid Scott £500 for the assault.

== Elevation to the House of Lords ==
In July 1863 Seymour was summoned to the House of Lords through a writ of acceleration in his father's junior title of Baron Seymour.

== Personal life and the Seymour succession ==
In 1866 Seymour began a relationship with a 17-year-old maid called Rosina Elizabeth Swan, of Higham, Bury St. Edmunds, Suffolk. He took her with him during his travels, returning to England with her in 1868 to live near Brighton. Seymour and Rosina had two children; a girl Ruth Mary (1867–1953) was born whilst the couple were in Tangier and a boy Harold St. Maur was born in Brighton.

A few months after the birth of his son, Seymour died during a botched emergency tracheotomy at his flat in Dover Street, Mayfair, London. If Seymour had been married to Rosina, Harold would have now been the heir to his grandfather's dukedom; and he spent years trying to prove that a marriage had taken place. Searching for a possible Dutch witness to the marriage, by the name of Ravesteyn, he vainly published an advertisement in a newspaper in the Netherlands in 1924, offering a reward of £50 for proof of the fact.

In 1885 the 12th Duke died. He had outlived both of his sons (Seymour's brother, Lord Edward, having died in 1865). The 12th Duke's brother Archibald Seymour became the 13th Duke of Somerset. Seymour's daughter became a suffragist and socialist member of the Women's Social and Political Union; her children included the 8th Duke of Portland and 9th Duke of Portland. His son, Harold, had a brief political career and served in the First World War before claiming legitimate descent in an attempt to become the holder of the Somerset duchy, to no avail.

Peerage of England
Preceded by Edward Seymour	Baron Seymour (writ of acceleration); 1863–1869	Succeeded by Edward Seymour
