= Michael Linning Melville =

Michael Linning Melville (1805 – 22 June 1878) was a Scots Barrister, Judge and Lieutenant Governor and Chief Justice of Sierra Leone. He was commissioned by King William IV of the United Kingdom to suppress the slave trade by force off the West Coast of Africa.

== Background and career ==
Melville was an ethnic Scotsman from Dublin where his family had lived since the middle of the 18th century. He was named after his godfather, the writer Michael Linning, and went on to marry the latter's niece Elizabeth Helen Callender.

In September 1818, both of Melville's parents died within a few days of each other. His loss aroused the pity of the Prince Regent who, in November of that year, granted the boy an annual pension from the Civil List.

At some stage in the 1820s Meville joined the Foreign Office. By 1827 he was serving as a Justice of the Peace and in 1835 Hansard lists Melville as King's Advocate and Registrar of the Vice Admiralty Court in Freetown, Sierra Leone. He interposed his tours of duty in Africa with study at Lincoln's Inn being called to the bar in 1843.

In September 1842 Queen Victoria made Melville a Judge. Later that year the Earl of Aberdeen, Secretary of State for Foreign Affairs, appointed Melville to sit on the Mixed British and Foreign Courts of Commission for the Suppression of the Slave Trade.

His service in West Africa was to form the basis for his wife's 1849 memoir A Residence in Sierra Leone Described from a Journal Kept on the Spot and from Letters Written to Friends at Home Edited by Mrs. Norton, which was edited by her first cousin Caroline Norton. The book is one of the only surviving accounts of life in mid-nineteenth century Africa written from the perspective of a woman and contains descriptions of life and society in early Victorian Freetown and the countryside nearby as well as her husband's work seizing slave ships, prosecuting their crews, and overseeing the breaking up of the vessels at a place called "Destruction Bay".

Melville's own correspondence with Lord Aberdeen contains a number of detailed and vivid descriptions of the struggle to suppress the transatlantic slave trade and release its victims. A letter of 27 April 1844 is typical:

"The Santa Anna cleared out from Bahia on 24 December last, with slave provisions and equipment, and a small quantity of tobacco and other goods on board, and proceeded direct to Lagos, where she arrived on the 5th of February, when one of her officers, according to the usual custom, seems to have gone on shore to arrange about a cargo of slaves, the vessel putting to sea again in the meanwhile and cruizing [sic] about to avoid risk of capture. On the 5th of March, 311 slaves were embarked in this small schooner, which is apparently not more than 35 British tons in burthen. On the 4th of April, having lost in the interim by death several of her human cargo, she was fallen in with, to the northward of Ascension, by Her Majesy's [sic] brig HMS Rapid, and, after a chase, captured; most fortunately for the lives as we well as the liberties of the slaves, the quantity of water found on board being very deficient, and barely lasting until the arrival of the vessel at Sierra Leone... No flag nor any official papers were found in the vessel to indicate her nationality; but that difficulty was sufficiently obviated, and the Brazilian character of the vessel, and the traffic in which she was engaged, clearly established by the admissions of the witnesses, and the evidence afforded by two log-books and a list of the cargo of slaves which had been discovered on board; her condemnation consequently took place as above mentioned, the surviving slaves, 267 in number, (one having died here before adjudication,) being at the same time emancipated."

(M. L. Melville to the Earl of Aberdeen 27 April 1844 in "Correspondence with the British Commissioners at Sierra Leone, Havana, Rio de Janeiro, Surinam, Cape of Good Hope, Jamaica, Loanda, and Boa Vista Relating to The Slave Trade from January 1 to December 31, 1844 inclusive" HMSO)

== Marriage and family ==
In 1840, Melville married Elizabeth Helen Callender, daughter of Randall William McDonnell Callander (died 1858), of Craigforth House Stirlingshire and Ardkinglas Castle, Argyle. Randall Callander was the younger son, but eventual heir, of Sir James Campbell (1745–1831) of Ardkinglas Castle. Melville's wife was a descendant of James II of Scotland and related the leading families of the Scottish and Anglo-Irish aristocracy. At this time in British history, before the publication of the Northcote–Trevelyan Report, appointment and promotion in the Civil Service depended on aristocratic patronage and Elizabeth's connections (her uncle, Sir James Graham, Bt, was at that time Home Secretary) would have been an immense asset for Melville's career

As described in A Residence in Sierra Leone Michael and Elizabeth Melville had a son Robert Melville (judge, of Hartfield Grove Sussex, and Ashford Hall Shropshire), born in Sierra Leone. They later had a daughter Elizabeth, born in Scotland in 1847, who married Arthur Champernowne of Dartington Hall, Devon.

Michael Linning Melville and his wife Elizabeth both died in 1876 and are buried in the old churchyard at Dartington Hall in South Devon, England. Their son Robert is buried at the new Dartington church, built by Arthur Melville Champernowne (a grandson of Michael and Elizabeth Melville).

== Later life ==
After his service in Sierra Leone, Melville returned to Britain. In 1870 he purchased Hartfield Grove, a large house in the Ashdown Forest, Sussex where he lived with his wife, his son Robert, and Robert's growing family.

In 1862 he became a Director of the London and North Western Railway.

| Preceded by Alexander Findlay | Lieutenant Governor of Sierra Leone; 1833–1834 | Succeeded by Octavius Temple |
