= The Sheridan Family =

Painting by Benjamin West

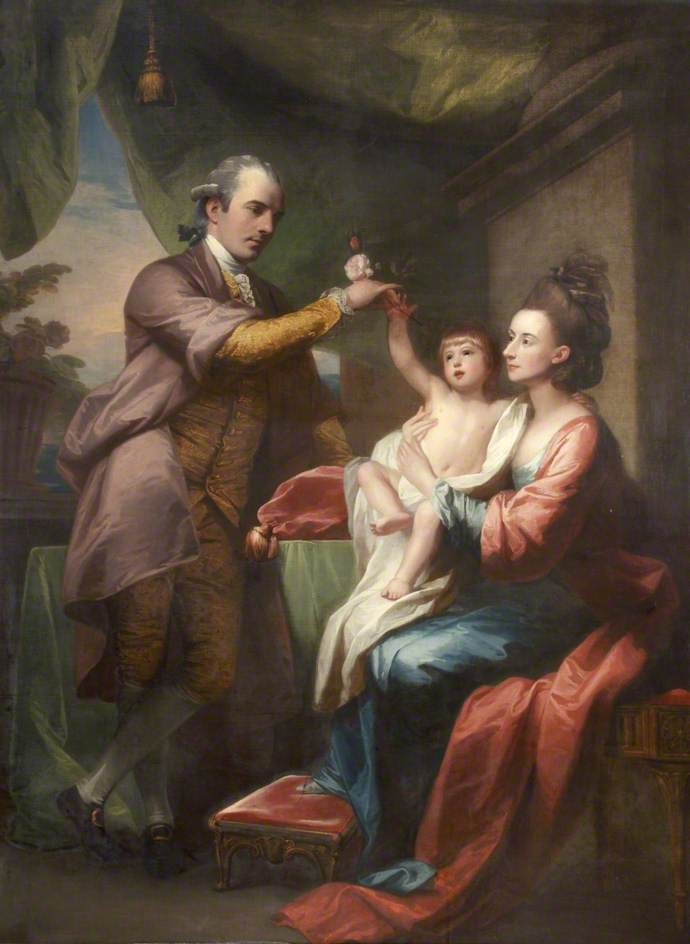
- Artist: Benjamin West
- Year: c.1776
- Type: Oil on canvas, portrait painting
- Dimensions: 227.9 cm × 166.6 cm (89.7 in × 65.6 in)
- Location: Walker Art Gallery, Liverpool

The Sheridan Family is a c.1776 portrait painting by the Anglo-American artist Benjamin West. It depicts the Irish playwright Richard Brinsley Sheridan and his English wife Elizabeth Ann Linley, a noted singer, with their young son Thomas. West had moved to Britain after a stay in Rome. He enjoyed success with his history paintings such as The Death of General Wolfe as well as portraits.

Today the painting is in the collection of the Walker Art Gallery in Liverpool, having been acquired in 1933.

== Bibliography ==
- Alberts, Robert C. Benjamin West; A Biography. Houghton Mifflin, 1978.
- Highfill, Philip H, Burnim, Kalman A. & Langhans, Edward A. A Biographical Dictionary of Actors, Actresses, Musicians, Dancers, Managers & Other Stage Personnel in London, 1660–1800, Volume 13. SIU Press, 1993.
