= Stuart of Dunleath =

1851 novel by Caroline Norton

- Title page of an 1853 Dutch edition
- Author: Caroline Norton
- Language: English
- Genre: Romantic tragedy
- Publisher: Henry Colburn
- Publication date: 1851
- Publication place: United Kingdom
- Media type: Print

Stuart of Dunleath is an 1851 novel by the British writer Caroline Norton. It was published in London in three volumes by Henry Colburn. As with several of her works, Norton drew heavily on her own life experiences for the story including her marriage to a brutish husband, her romantic attachment to an older man Lord Melbourne and the loss of her son William in 1842. Norton dedicated the book to the Queen of the Netherlands Sophie of Württemberg who she had met and who had recently lost a son herself Prince Maurice which Norton alludes to in the introduction.

== Bibliography ==
- Atkinson, Diane. The Criminal Conversation of Mrs. Norton. Chicago Review Press, 2013.
- Fraser, Antonia. The Case of the Married Woman. Orion, 2021.
- Surridge, Lisa Anne. Bleak Houses: Marital Violence in Victorian Fiction. Ohio University Press, 2005.
