= Lady Helen Violet Graham =

British noblewoman (1879–1945)

Lady Helen Violet Graham DCVO (1879–1945) was a British noblewoman who served as Woman of the Bedchamber to Queen Mary and Queen Elizabeth II and as President of the Young Woman's Christian Association. She was one of the first people to be appointed Dame Commander of the Royal Victorian Order in 1937 after women were admitted to the order in 1936.

Lady Graham was the daughter of Douglas Graham, 5th Duke of Montrose and Violet Graham, Duchess of Montrose. She served as Lady in Waiting to Mary Teck while she was Duchess of York, and Queen Mary appointed her Woman of the Bedchamber in 1939. Lady Graham invited Queen Elizabeth II to make a radio address to the YWCA in April 1940, and became their National President in 1942.
