= The Glorious First of June (play) =

1794 play

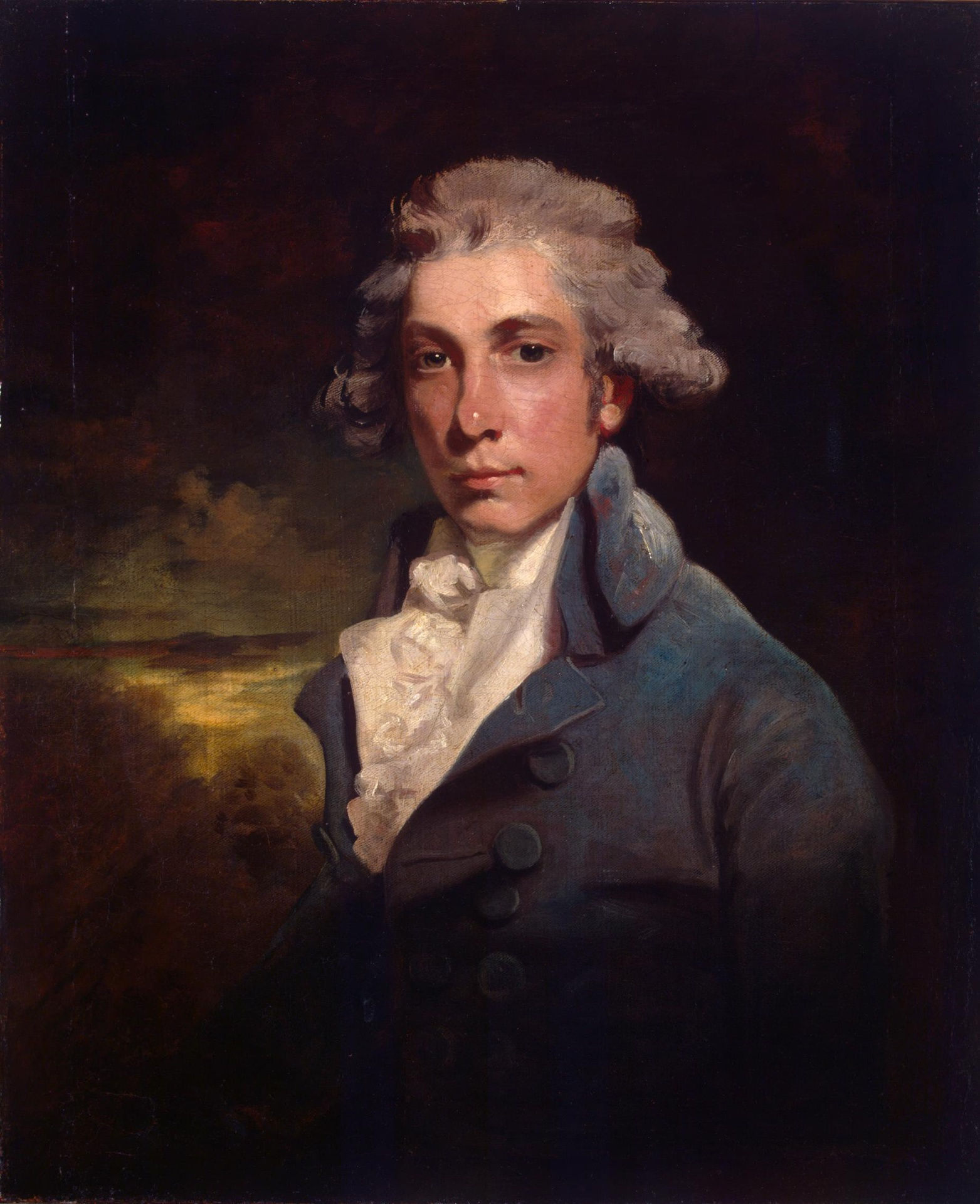
- Original language: English
- Written by: Richard Brinsley Sheridan

Premiere
- Date: 1794
- Place: Theatre Royal, Drury Lane, London

The Glorious First of June is a 1794 play by Richard Brinsley Sheridan. It depicts the Glorious First of June, a British naval victory over the French that took place on 1 June 1794 during the French Revolutionary War. It premiered on 2 July 1794 at the Drury Lane theatre, and was based on newspaper accounts of the battle. It contains a debate on the question of naval patriotism – a key issue at the time. The profits made from the play were donated to the families of those killed in the battle.

== Characters ==
- Comodore Broadside
- Endless
- Old Cottager
- Robin
- William
- Tom Oakum
- Ben
- Splicem
- Boy
- Dick
- Busy
- Cottager's Wife
- Mary
- Susan
- Girl
- Cicely
- Margaretta
- Sailors, Countrymen, Countrylasses

== Bibliography ==
- Jenks, Timothy. Naval engagements: patriotism, cultural politics, and the Royal Navy, 1793-1815. Oxford University Press, 2006, ISBN 978-0199297719
