= Douglas Graham, 5th Duke of Montrose =

Scottish nobleman (1852–1925)

His Grace The Duke of Montrose KT
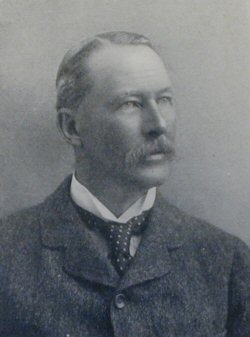

Lord High Commissioner to the General Assembly of the Church of Scotland
- In office 1916–1917
- Preceded by: The Earl of Aberdeen
- Succeeded by: John Stewart-Murray, 8th Duke of Atholl

Member of the House of Lords Lord Temporal
- In office 30 December 1874 – 10 December 1925; Hereditary Peerage
- Preceded by: The 4th Duke of Montrose
- Succeeded by: The 6th Duke of Montrose

Personal details
- Born: 7 November 1852 Mayfair, London, England
- Died: 10 December 1925 (aged 73) Park District, Glasgow, Scotland
- Spouse: Violet Hermione Graham
- Children: 5, including James Graham, 6th Duke of Montrose
- Parent(s): James Graham, 4th Duke of Montrose; Hon. Caroline Beresford

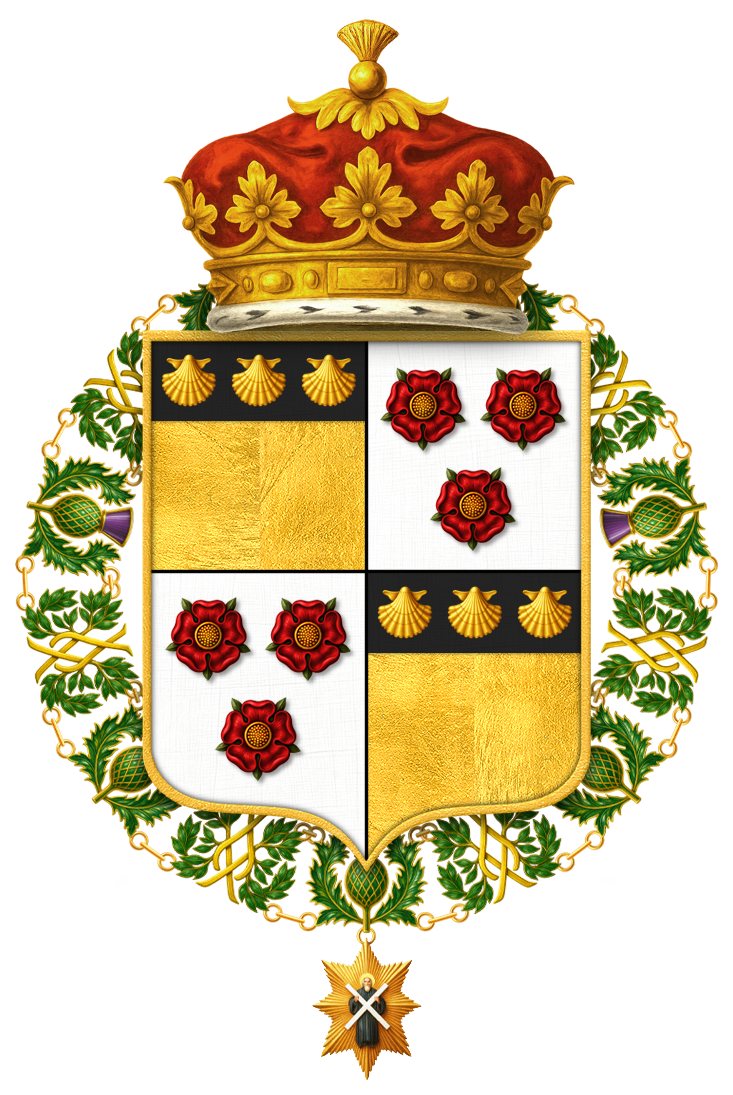
Shield of Arms of Douglas Beresford Malise Ronald Graham, 5th Duke of Montrose, KT

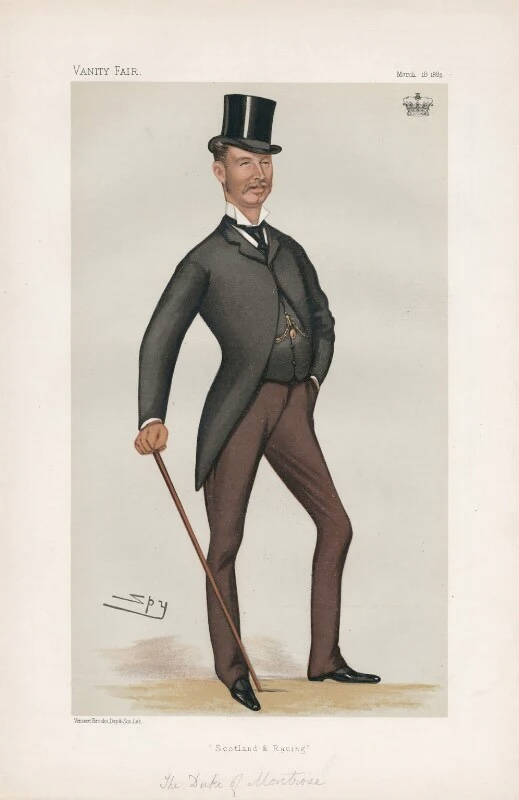
"Scotland and Racing". Caricature by Spy published in Vanity Fair in 1882

Douglas Beresford Malise Ronald Graham, 5th Duke of Montrose, KT (7 November 1852 – 10 December 1925), styled Lord Ronald Graham until 1872 and Marquess of Graham until 1874, was a Scottish nobleman, soldier and landowner.

== Early life ==
Born in 1852, Montrose was the third but eldest-surviving son of James Graham, 4th Duke of Montrose and his wife, The Hon. Caroline Horsley-Beresford, daughter of John Beresford, 2nd Baron Decies. He had two elder brothers, both named James and thus was not expected to succeed, but both died in succession. He was educated at Eton College and succeeded his father as Duke of Montrose, in the Peerage of Scotland, in 1874.

== Career ==
Montrose joined the Coldstream Guards in 1872, transferred to the 5th Royal Irish Lancers in 1874, and retired from active duty in 1878. From October 1881 to January 1903, he was Colonel commanding the 3rd (Militia) Battalion of the Argyll and Sutherland Highlanders, stationed at Stirling. He served in the Second Boer War (medal and two clasps). Montrose again saw active service fighting with the Argyll and Sutherland Highlanders in the First World War. He later served as Captain-General of the Royal Company of Archers, the King's Bodyguard for Scotland.

Montrose was aide-de-camp to Queen Victoria, King Edward VII and George V successively. He was Lord Lieutenant of Stirlingshire from 1885 to 1925, Hereditary Sheriff of Dumbartonshire (now Dunbartonshire), Lord Clerk Register from 1890 until his death, and Lord High Commissioner to the General Assembly of the Church of Scotland in 1916–1917. In January 1900 he accepted the Presidency of the Scotland Branch of the British Empire League.

Montrose was appointed a Knight of the Order of the Thistle (KT) in 1879 and was Chancellor of the Order from 1917.

== Personal life ==
In 1876, Montrose married Violet Hermione Graham, daughter of Sir Frederick Graham, 3rd Baronet and his wife Lady Jane St Maur, daughter of Edward St Maur, 12th Duke of Somerset. They had five children:

- Commodore James Graham, 6th Duke of Montrose (1878–1954), who married Lady Mary, daughter of William Douglas-Hamilton, 12th Duke of Hamilton and had issue.
- Lady Helen Violet Graham (1879–1945), Lady-in-waiting to Queen Elizabeth; died without issue.
- Lady Hermione Emily Graham (1882–1978), who married Sir Donald Cameron of Lochiel, 25th Chief of Clan Cameron, and had issue.
- Brigadier Lord Douglas Malise Graham (born 1883), who married The Hon. Rachael, daughter of Sydney Holland, 2nd Viscount Knutsford.
- Captain Lord Alastair Mungo Graham (born 1886), who married Lady Meriel, daughter of Seymour Bathurst, 7th Earl Bathurst.

Montrose died in December 1925 in a nursing home at 6 Park Gardens in the Park District of Glasgow. He was buried at Buchanan Castle and passed on the title to his son the 6th Duke of Montrose.

He owned 103,000 acres, with 68,000 acres in Stirlingshire and 32,000 acres in Perthshire.

Political offices
Preceded by The Earl of Glasgow	Lord Clerk Register; 1890–1925	Succeeded by The Duke of Buccleuch
Honorary titles
Preceded by The Earl of Dunmore	Lord Lieutenant of Stirlingshire; 1885–1925	Succeeded by The Viscount Younger of Leckie
Preceded by The Duke of Atholl	Chancellor of the Order of the Thistle; 1917–1925	Succeeded by The Duke of Roxburghe
Peerage of Scotland
Preceded by James Graham	Duke of Montrose; 1874–1925	Succeeded by James Graham
