= A Trip to Scarborough =

18th-century play by Richard Sheridan

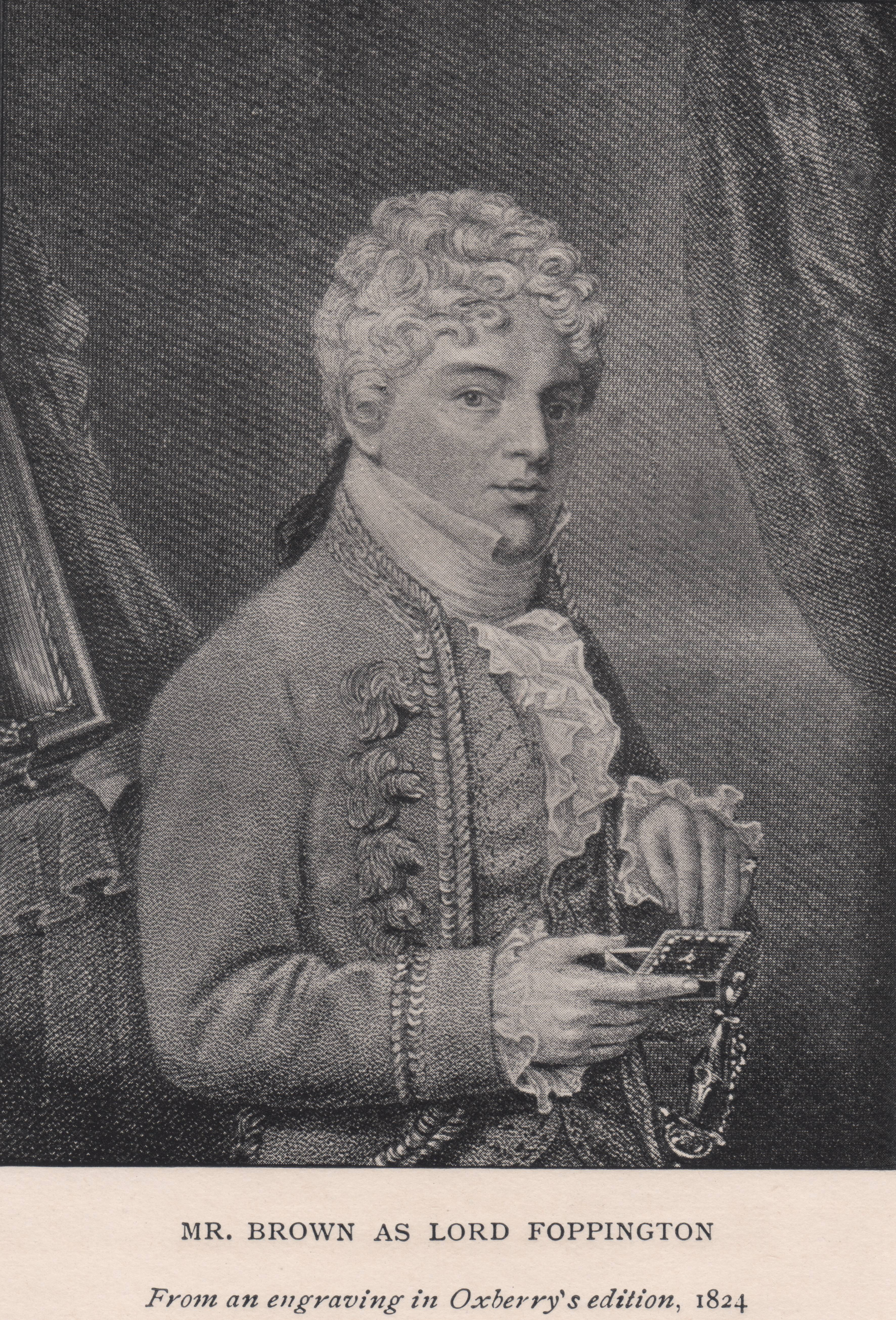
Mr Brown as Lord Foppington

A Trip to Scarborough is an 18th-century play by Richard Brinsley Sheridan (1751–1816), first performed on 24 February 1777. Sheridan based his work on John Vanbrugh's The Relapse (1696), removing much of the bawdy content.

The play was reworked as one of three plot strands in a 1982 revival by Alan Ayckbourn, with the action taking place in the Royal Hotel, Scarborough. The first performance was on 8 December that year. It is a technically demanding piece as the actors are required to take on several roles, with quick changes between scenes as the play switches from the 18th century to World War II to the present day. Ayckbourn updated the production when it returned to the Stephen Joseph Theatre in the town during 2007–2008.

== Plot ==
The hero of the play, Tom Fashion, arrives penniless in Scarborough, attended by but one faithful servant, Lory, who privately informs the audience that he will never desert his master until he pays him his wages. Fashion has come to visit his rich elder brother, Lord Foppington, whom he hopes to be able to beg money from.

When he arrives, he finds his friend, Colonel Townley, also in town. Townley tells him that Lord Foppington is about to be married to a rich young lady, the daughter of Sir Tunbelly Clumsey, a gentleman of the region. However, he also learns that the two have never met, and are communicating through a go-between, who was an old ally of Fashion's, one Dame Coupler. He determines if possible to outwit his brother, and by marrying the girl, obtain her fortune. The colonel promises to help him, and they soon also are able to enlist the support to another acquaintance of theirs, Loveless. He was the more inclined to help them as Lord Foppington had recently had the audacity to make love to his wife, Amanda.

The plot thickens as Colonel Townley's beloved Berinthia comes on the scene; he sees her as a frustratingly capricious woman, but she mainly acts this way because she wants to severely test her admirer's fidelity before accepting his proposals, not satisfied with his previous loose way of life. In anger, to make her jealous he pretends to make love to Amanda himself, who rigidly repulses him, and not comprehending his game, Loveless in turn begins to persecute Berinthia. Eventually their complicated diversion comes to light, and with it settled, the more serious game of stealing Lord Foppington's intended can proceed.

Tom Fashion goes to Dame Coupler, and obtains letters of introduction from her at Sir Tunbelly's house. Quickly ingratiating himself there, the father agrees for them to be wedded the next week, but Tom bribes Miss Hoyden's nurse to marry at once, before Lord Foppington's imminent arrival. When he comes, they manage to keep up the pretense of his being an impostor for a little, but eventually some friends of his appear, and Tom is forced to own to the deception. However, the couple is already safely married and thus Tom gains his desired end – a bride, a fortune, and the utter discomfiture of his brother.

== Dramatis personae ==
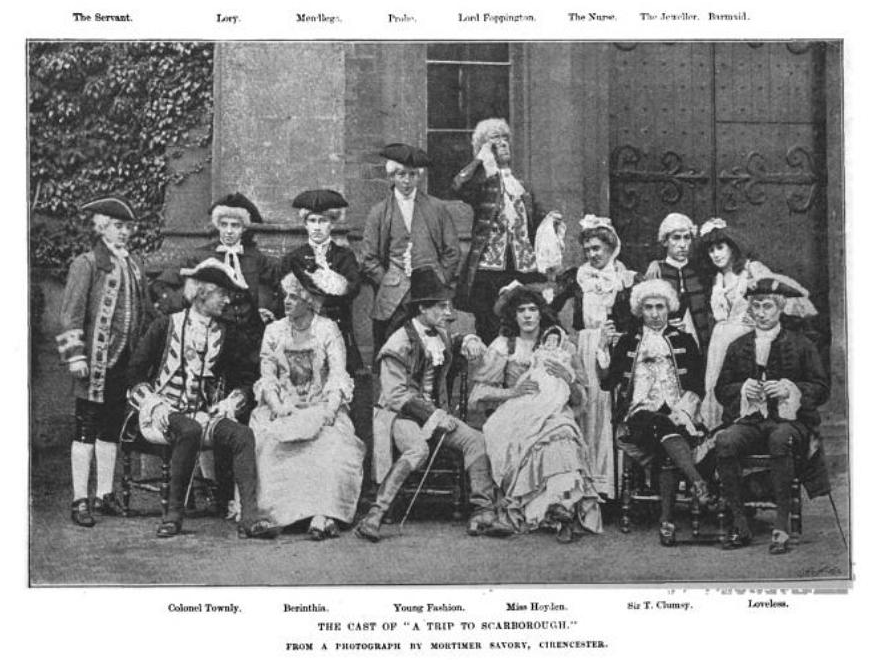
Cast photo from The Sketch, 20 March 1895

=== Men ===
- Lord Foppington
- Young Fashion
- Loveless
- Colonel Townley
- Sir Tunbelly Clumsey
- Probe
- Lory
- La Varole
- Shoemaker
- Taylor
- Hosier
- Jeweller
- Servants

=== Women ===
- Berinthia
- Amanda
- Mrs Coupler
- Nurse
- Miss Hoyden
