= Old Sir Douglas =

1866 novel by Caroline Norton

- Author: Caroline Norton
- Language: English
- Genre: Domestic fiction, romance
- Publisher: Hurst and Blackett
- Publication date: 1868
- Publication place: United Kingdom
- Media type: Print

Old Sir Douglas is an 1868 novel by the British writer Caroline Norton. It was published in London in three volumes by Hurst and Blackett. Norton drew on her own experience in 1836, when she was involved in a notorious case of criminal conversation when the sitting Prime Minister Lord Melbourne was sued for an alleged affair by her husband George Chapple Norton. It was originally serialised in Macmillan's Magazine from 1866 to 1867 and was her final novel.

== Synopsis ==
When faced with two possible marriage suitors the twenty two year old Gertrude Skifton rejects Kenneth Ross for his older uncle Sir Douglas. The young man's selfishness is contrasted sharply with the patient nobility of the baronet. However, neighbours wrongly suspect that she has married for social climbing reasons, while Sir Douglas has his own doubts if marrying her ahead of his nephew was truly the right thing to do. Ultimately their relationship is vindicated after she is falsely accused of adultery.

== Bibliography ==
- Fraser, Antonia. The Case of the Married Woman. Orion, 2021.
- Heath, Kay. Aging by the Book: The Emergence of Midlife in Victorian Britain. State University of New York Press, 2009.
- Ó'Cinnéide, Muireann. Aristocratic Women and the Literary Nation, 1832-1867. Palgrave Macmillan, 2008.
- Sutherland, Joan. The Stanford Companion to Victorian Fiction. Santford University Press, 1989.
