= Georgiana Seymour, Duchess of Somerset =

English duchess (1809–1884)

Her Grace The Duchess of Somerset
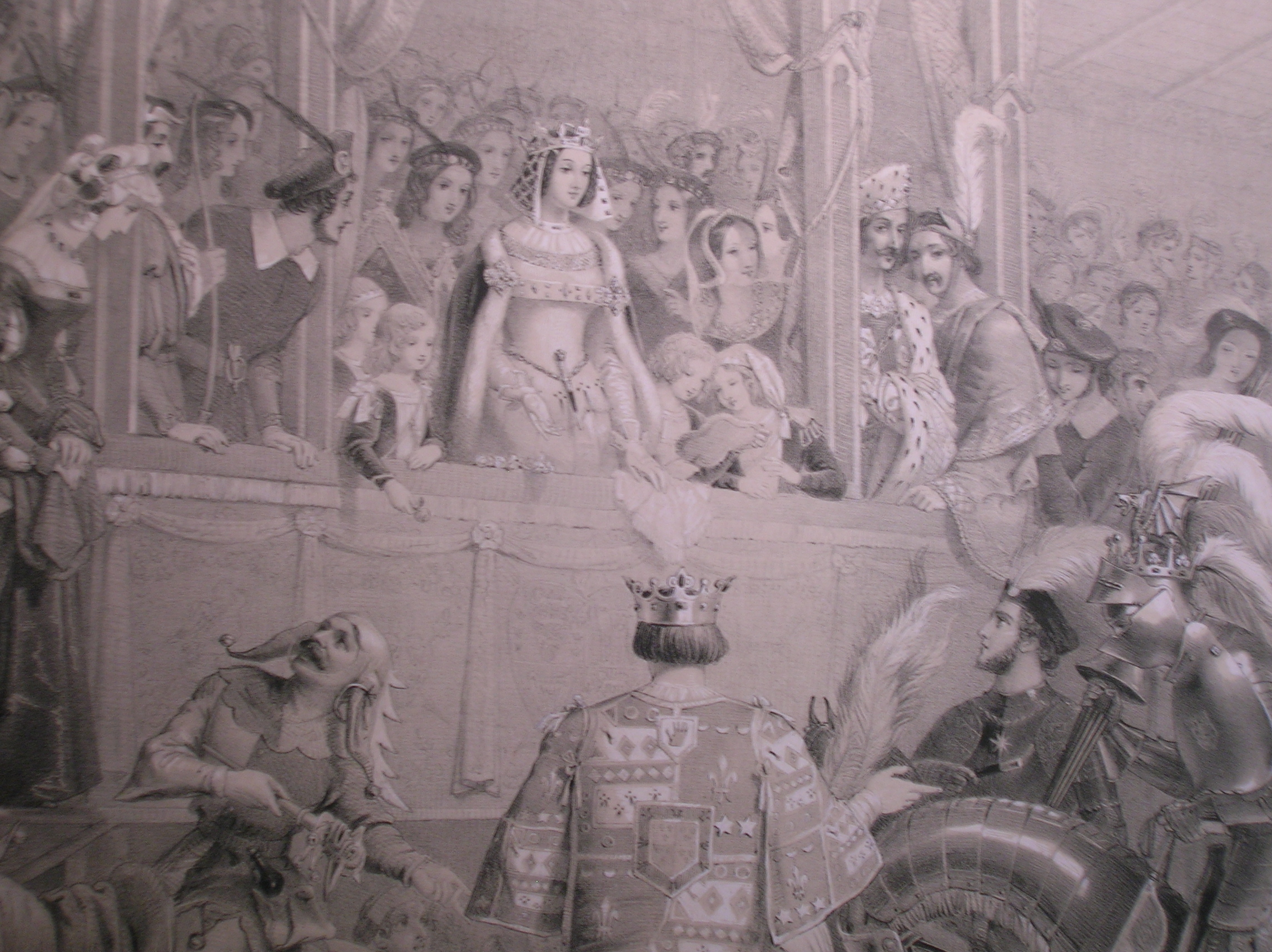
- Duchess Georgiana at the Eglinton Tournament
- Born: 5 November 1809
- Died: 14 December 1884 (aged 75)
- Spouse: Edward St Maur, 12th Duke of Somerset
- Issue: 5
- Father: Thomas Sheridan
- Mother: Caroline Callander

Jane Georgiana Seymour, Duchess of Somerset (née Sheridan; 5 November 1809 – 14 December 1884), was the wife of Edward, Duke of Somerset.

== Early life ==
Jane Georgiana Sheridan was the third daughter of Thomas Sheridan and his wife the novelist Caroline Callander, daughter of Sir James Callander of Craigforth and Ardkinglas. She was the younger sister of "three beautiful Sheridan girls," her elder sisters being Helen (wife of Price Blackwood, 4th Baron Dufferin and Claneboye), songwriter, composer, poet, and author, and Caroline (wife of George Chapple Norton and Sir William Stirling-Maxwell, 9th Baronet), society beauty, feminist, social reformer, and author. Georgiana, Helen, and Caroline were the granddaughters of Irish playwright Richard Brinsley Sheridan.

== Society life ==
Known for her loveliness, the Duchess was chosen to be the "Queen of Beauty" at the Eglinton Tournament in 1839.

According to the memoirs of Lady Dorothy Nevill, the Duchess unsuccessfully attempted to introduce guinea pigs to the English culinary scene.

== Personal life ==
On 10 June 1830, when he was twenty-five and she was twenty, she married Edward, Lord Seymour, the eldest son of Edward St Maur, 11th Duke of Somerset, and Lady Charlotte Hamilton (a daughter of the 9th Duke of Hamilton). Together, they had two sons and three daughters:

- Lady Jane Hermione Seymour (1832–1909), who married Sir Frederick Graham, 3rd Baronet, son of Sir James Graham, 2nd Baronet, who served as Home Secretary and First Lord of the Admiralty.
- Lady Ulrica Frederica Jane Seymour (1833–1916), who married the Rt. Hon. Lord Henry Thynne, the Treasurer of the Household who was the second son of Henry Thynne, 3rd Marquess of Bath.
- Edward Adolphus Ferdinand, Earl St. Maur, suo jure 13th Baron Seymour (1835–1869), who had two illegitimate children by his maid, Rosina Swan.
- Lord Edward Percy Seymour (1841–1865), a diplomat who died unmarried in India after being mauled by a bear.
- Lady Helen Guendolen Seymour (1846–1910), who married Sir John Ramsden, 5th Baronet, a son of John Charles Ramsden.

The Duchess was survived by her husband by less than a year. After a funeral in the churchyard, she was interred at Gerrard's Cross, Buckinghamshire.

=== Descendants ===
Through her daughter Jane, she was a grandmother of eight, including Margaret, Countess of Verulam and Violet Graham, Duchess of Montrose.

Through her eldest son Ferdinand, she was a grandmother of Harold St. Maur, who claimed he was legitimate and, after his father's death, declared himself heir to the Dukedom of Somerset.
