= Thomas Sheridan (soldier) =

British Army officer

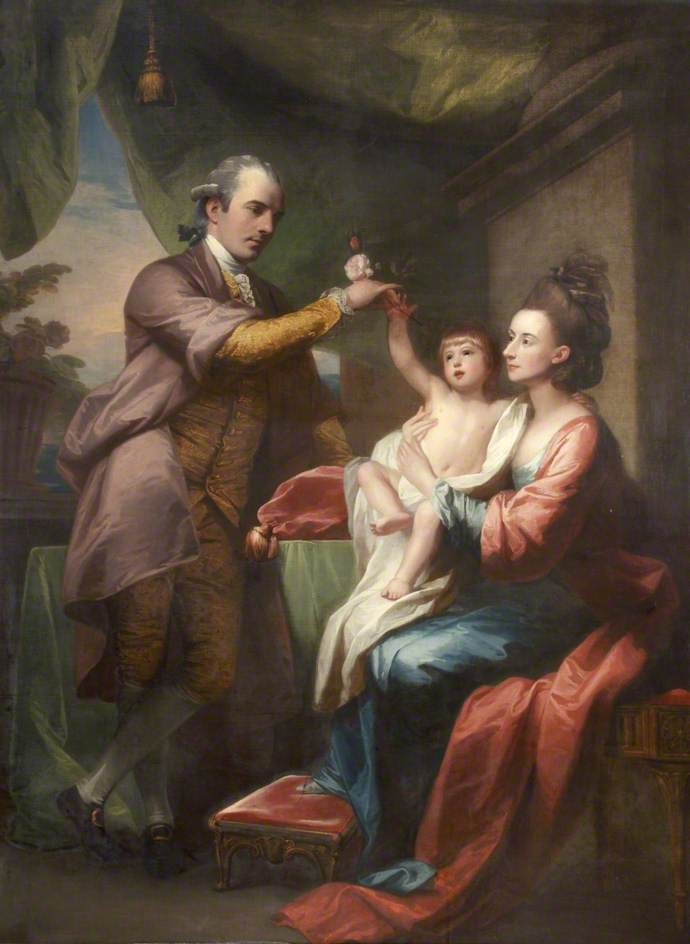
Thomas Sheridan as a baby in The Sheridan Family painted by Benjamin West c. 1776 although Kalinsky considers it would be around 1778 as Tom seems to be approximately three years old; she also feels it is a poor depiction of his mother but qualifies this by stating West typically was not successful at reproducing women's portraits.

Thomas Sheridan (16 or 17 November 1775 – 12 September 1817) was the only son of the Irish playwright and poet Richard Brinsley Sheridan and the soprano Elizabeth Ann Linley, although his father had at least one other son from a second marriage. Born in mid-November 1775, Sheridan initially tried for a career in politics but was unsuccessful.

== Early life and family ==
The courtship of Sheridan's parents, the soprano Elizabeth Ann Linley and the playwright Richard Brinsley Sheridan, was described in newspaper reports as "one of the classic romances of the west country" and stated that his mother was "the most beautiful singer in England"; she abandoned her career as a singer when she married Richard in April 1773 as he thought her profession reflected badly on his status as a gentleman. She had several miscarriages before Sheridan was born in mid-November 1775; (Note: A. Norman Jeffares gives the date of birth as 17 November 1775 whereas Black gives 16 November 1775.) she named him after Thomas Linley, and Thomas Sheridan, his maternal and paternal grandfathers respectively. The young Sheridan was sent to boarding school in Hatton, Warwickshire in early 1786, where he was educated by Samuel Parr. Parr described him as having "great acuteness, excellent understanding, wit and humour, but not a particle of knowledge." The English historian William Smyth was engaged as his tutor after the death of Sheridan's mother in 1792. Sheridan entered Trinity College, Cambridge in 1795. According to Smyth, Sheridan was the "idol of the young men" when at Cambridge and his fellow students thought him "the cleverest fellow in the place", although Smyth added his own rider clarifying that in humour and fun this was the case.

Sheridan married Caroline Henrietta Callander of Craigforth (1779–1851), a daughter of Sir James Campbell, on 21 June 1805. Sheridan's father was initially against the marriage, and threatened to sever financial support to his son; Caroline did have a small inheritance but it was insufficient to fully support the couple. They had six or seven children. (Note: Jeffares quotes seven children (four sons and three daughters) whereas Chedzoy and Black state six.) Their eldest son, Richard Brinsley Sheridan, was appointed as High Sheriff of Dorset in 1838 and pursued a political career. The couple's daughters included Helen Blackwood, Baroness Dufferin and Claneboye; the feminist Caroline Norton; and Georgiana Seymour, Duchess of Somerset.

== Career ==
Sheridan unsuccessfully tried for a political career, firstly being involved in political shenanigans with his father to gain the Liskeard seat in 1804. He failed to be elected at Stafford in 1806 and 1807. He briefly served in the army in 1803 under Lord Moira as aide-de-camp then in Ireland where he served as a muster-master general in 1806. That year, his father gifted him a 25 per cent share of the Drury Lane Theatre where Sheridan became the manager. He also undertook managerial duties at the Lyceum Theatre, London while still managing the Theatre Royal. He wrote poetry, plays and melodramas, including Description of Characters in 1808 and The Russian, which was staged for 11 performances at Drury Lane from 13 May 1813. According to the tenor Michael Kelly, a leading figure in British musical theatre, Sheridan had "a good voice, and a true taste for music". Sheridan's verse about the loss of the frigate, Saldanha, on the coastline of Ireland on 4 December 1811, was described by Captain Jesse in the biography The Life of George Brummell as having more originality than any of Sheridan's father's poems.

A manuscript for the play The Siege of St Quintin staged at the Drury Lane Theatre in November 1808 demonstrates the working methods used by Sheridan and his father while managing the theatre. Drafts were read through and checked by Sheridan senior, further revised by the son and then transcribed.

While carrying out his army service under Lord Moira in Edinburgh, Sheridan was intimately involved with the wife of Peter Campbell, a wealthy businessman whose work had taken him to the West Indies. The affair led to the break up of the Campbell's marriage and in 1807, Sheridan was convicted of criminal conversation over it. Campbell was awarded £1,500 compensation, which Sheridan paid with money loaned by actors from the Drury Lane Theatre.

Like many of his relatives, including his mother and aunt, Sheridan was afflicted with tuberculosis and he moved abroad with his wife and eldest daughter to ease the symptoms; he was appointed as the Colonial Governor's treasurer at the Cape of Good Hope in 1813 as a result of his father's influence with the Duke of York.

== Legacy and death ==
Four years after taking up his appointment at the Cape of Good Hope, Sheridan died of tuberculosis on 12 September 1817; (Note: Chedzoy gives September 1818, a mis-print as newspapers report details of his death in early 1818.) his body was transported back to Britain and buried at Wells Cathedral in his mother's grave. After his death, his widow, together with his eldest daughter returned to Britain. She adopted a reclusive lifestyle but made a name for herself by authoring several books before her death in 1851.

Thomas Gainsborough painted several family portraits, particularly of Sheridan's mother, Elizabeth; a lesser known painting of Sheridan was purchased by an American art collector in 1928.
