= Richard Brinsley Sheridan =

Anglo-Irish playwright, writer and politician (1751–1816)

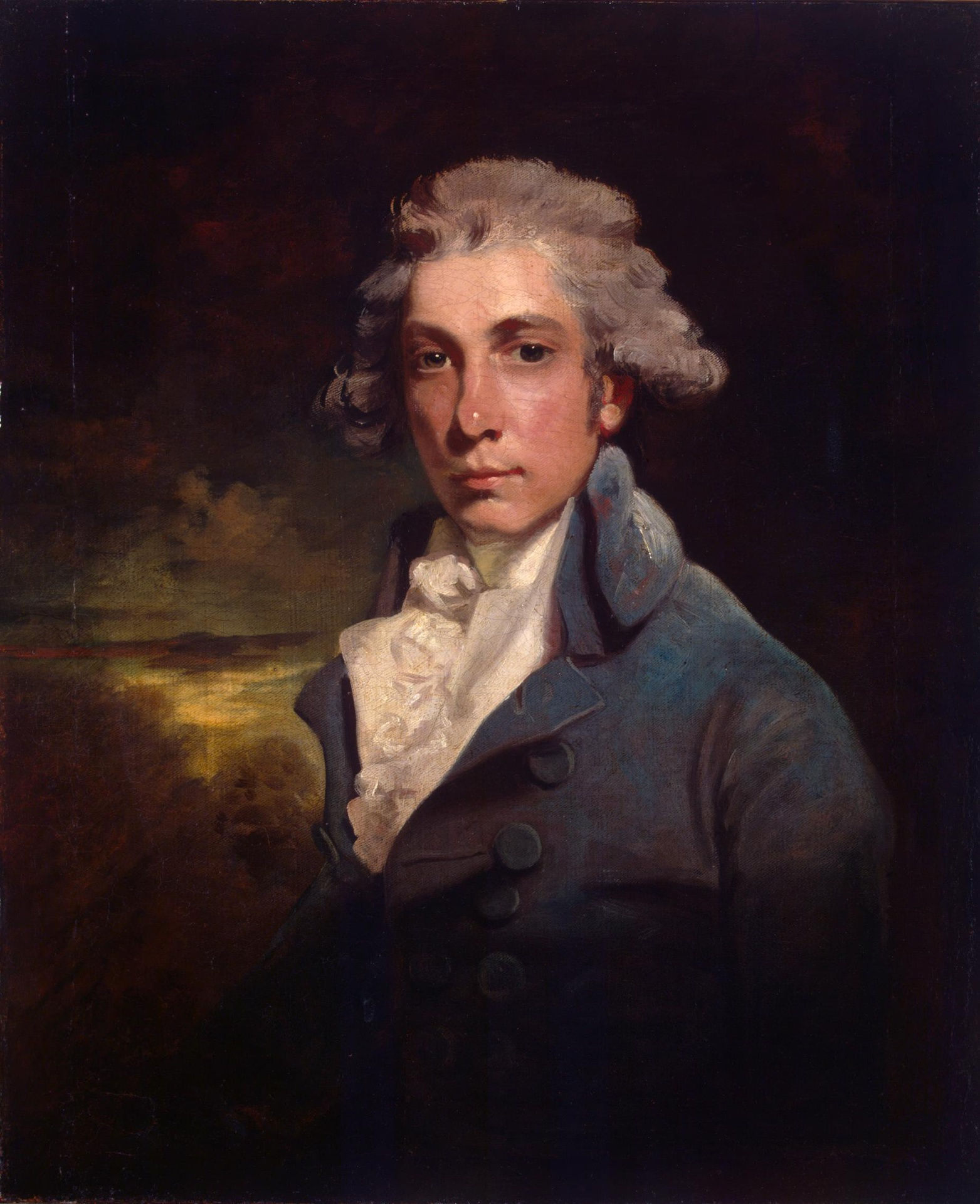
- Portrait by John Hoppner, c. 1788–1792

Treasurer of the Navy
- In office 1806–1807
- Monarch: George III
- Prime Minister: Lord Grenville
- Preceded by: George Canning
- Succeeded by: George Rose

Personal details
- Born: Richard Brinsley Butler Sheridan; 30 October 1751 Dublin, Ireland
- Died: 7 July 1816 (aged 64) London, England
- Party: Whig
- Spouse(s): Elizabeth Ann Linley; Esther Jane Ogle
- Children: Thomas Sheridan
- Parent(s): Thomas Sheridan; Frances Chamberlaine
- Profession: Playwright, politician

Richard Brinsley Butler Sheridan (30 October 1751 – 7 July 1816) was an Anglo-Irish playwright, writer and Whig politician who sat in the British House of Commons from 1780 to 1812, representing the constituencies of Stafford, Westminster and Ilchester. The owner of the Theatre Royal, Drury Lane, in London, he wrote several prominent plays such as The Rivals (1775), The Duenna (1775), The School for Scandal (1777) and A Trip to Scarborough (1777). He served as Treasurer of the Navy from 1806 to 1807. Sheridan died in 1816 and was buried at Poets' Corner in Westminster Abbey. His plays remain a central part of the Western canon and are frequently performed around the world.

== Early life ==
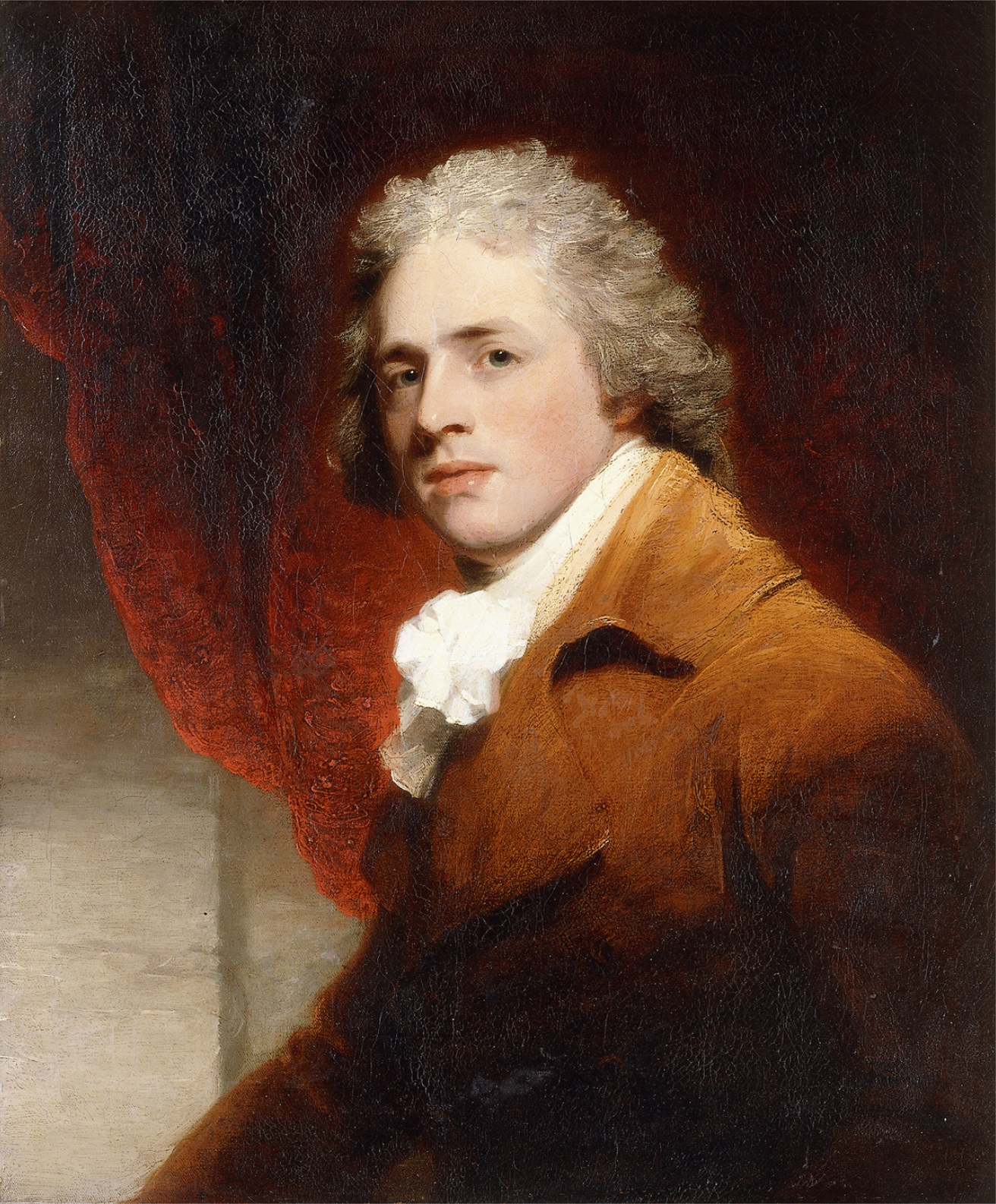
Portrait of a Gentleman, traditionally identified as Richard Brinsley Sheridan, by John Hoppner

Sheridan was born in 1751 in Dublin, Ireland, where his family had a house on the then fashionable Dorset Street. His mother, Frances Sheridan, was an Anglo-Irish playwright and novelist. She had two plays produced in London in the early 1760s, though she is best known for her novel The Memoirs of Miss Sidney Biddulph (1761). His Irish father, Thomas Sheridan, was for a while an actor-manager at the Smock Alley Theatre in Dublin, but following his move to England in 1758, he gave up acting and wrote several books on the subject of education, especially the standardisation of the English language in education. His elder brother was Charles Francis Sheridan. His paternal grandfather was The Rev. Thomas Sheridan from County Cavan, who was a close friend of Jonathan Swift.

While his family was in Dublin, Richard attended the English Grammar School in Grafton Street. In 1758, when he was seven years old, the Sheridans moved permanently to England. He was a pupil at Harrow School from 1762 to 1768. At the end of his 1768 school year, his father employed a private tutor, Lewis Ker, to direct his studies in his father's house in London, while Domenico Angelo instructed him in fencing and horsemanship.

In 1772, aged 20, Sheridan fought two duels with Captain Thomas Mathews, who had written a newspaper article defaming the character of Elizabeth Ann Linley, whom Sheridan intended to marry. In the first duel, they agreed to fight in Hyde Park, but finding it too crowded they went first to the Hercules Pillars tavern (on the site where Apsley House now stands at Hyde Park Corner) and then on to the Castle Tavern in Henrietta Street, Covent Garden. Far from its romantic image, the duel was short and bloodless. Mathews lost his sword and, according to Sheridan, was forced to 'beg for his life' and sign a retraction of the article. The apology was made public and Mathews, infuriated by the publicity the duel had received, refused to accept his defeat as final and challenged Sheridan to another duel. Sheridan was not obliged to accept this challenge but could have become a social pariah if he had not. The second duel, fought in July 1772 at Kingsdown near Bath, was a much more ferocious affair. This time both men broke their swords but carried on fighting in a 'desperate struggle for life and honour'. Both were wounded, Sheridan dangerously, and he had to be 'borne from the field with a portion of his antagonist's weapon sticking through an ear, his breast-bone touched, his whole body covered with wounds and blood, and his face nearly beaten to jelly with the hilt of Mathews' sword'. Mathews escaped in a post chaise. Eight days after the bloody affair the Bath Chronicle was able to announce that Sheridan was out of danger.

Mrs. Richard Brinsley Sheridan, aged 31, by Gainsborough (National Gallery of Art)

Later that year, Elizabeth and the 21-year-old Richard eloped and set up house in London on a lavish scale. Sheridan had little money and no immediate prospects of any, other than his wife's dowry. The young couple entered the fashionable world and apparently held up their end in entertaining. Sheridan was a patron of Margaret Cuyler and she was his presumed mistress. As his protégée she appeared at Drury Lane in January 1777, despite being a poor actress.

== Literary career ==
In 1775 Sheridan's first play, The Rivals, was produced at London's Covent Garden Theatre. It was a failure on its first night, and John Lee's performance as Sir Lucius O'Trigger was criticised for rendering the character "ridiculous and disgusting". Sheridan rewrote the play and presented it again a few days later, with Laurence Clinch replacing Lee in the role. In its reworked form it was a huge success, immediately establishing the young playwright's reputation and the favour of fashionable London. It went on to become a standard of English literature.

Shortly after the success of The Rivals, Sheridan and his father-in-law Thomas Linley the Elder, a successful composer, produced the opera The Duenna. This piece, warmly received, played for seventy-five performances.

His most famous play, The School for Scandal, premiered at Drury Lane on 8 May 1777. It is considered one of the greatest comedies of manners in English. It was followed by The Critic (1779), an updating of the satirical Restoration play The Rehearsal.

Having quickly made his name and fortune, in 1776 Sheridan bought David Garrick's share in the Drury Lane patent, and in 1778 the remaining share; his later plays were all produced there. In 1778 Sheridan wrote The Camp, which commented on the ongoing threat of a French invasion of Britain. The same year Sheridan's brother-in-law Thomas Linley, a young composer who worked with him at Drury Lane Theatre, died in a boating accident. Sheridan had a rivalry with his fellow playwright Richard Cumberland and included a parody of Cumberland in his play The Critic. On 24 February 1809 (despite the much vaunted fire safety precautions of 1794) the theatre burned down. On being encountered drinking a glass of wine in the street while watching the fire, Sheridan was famously reported to have said, "A man may surely be allowed to take a glass of wine by his own fireside." Sheridan was the manager of the theatre for many years, and later became sole owner with no managerial role.

== Political career ==
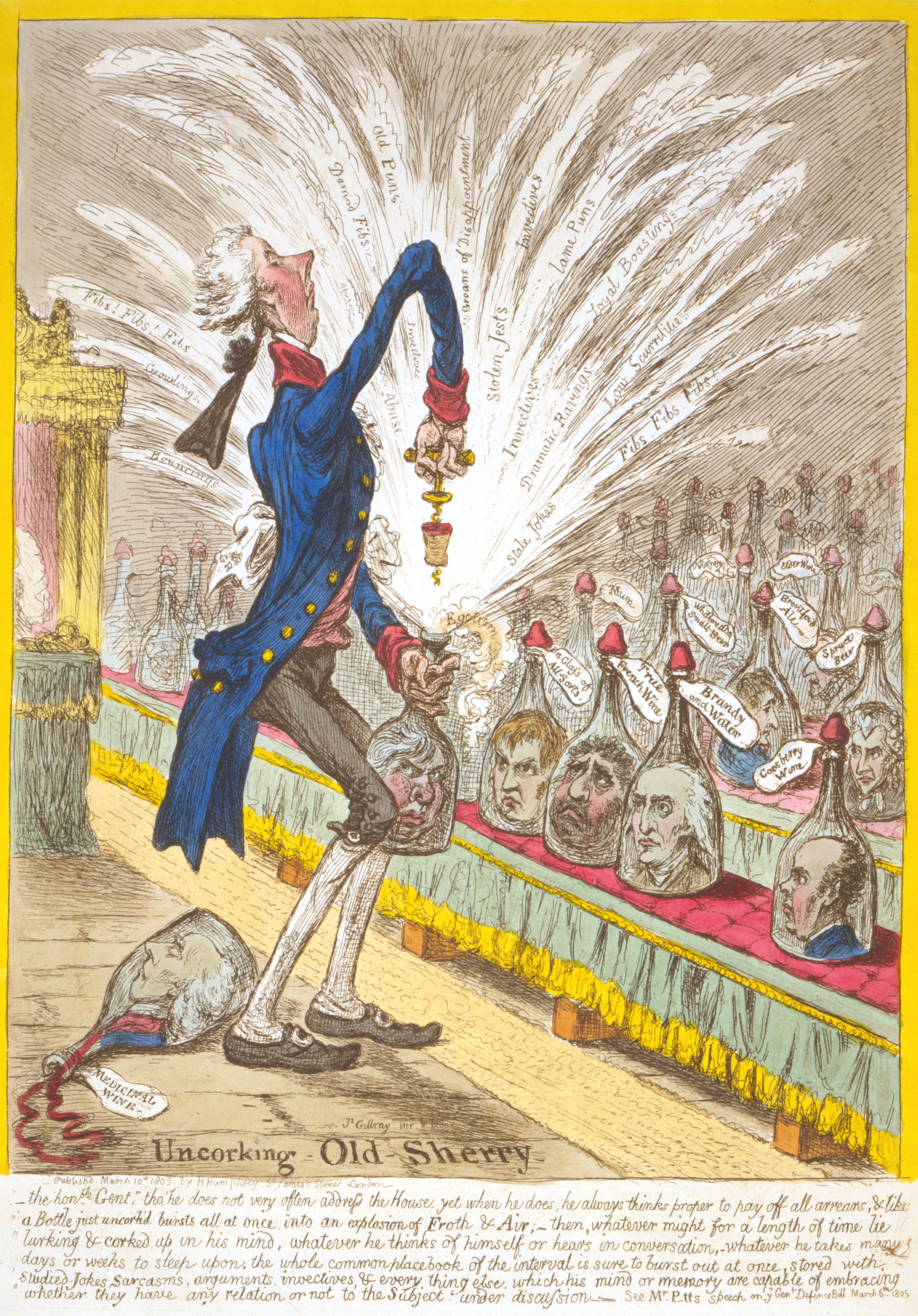
In Uncorking Old Sherry (1805), James Gillray caricatured Sheridan as a bottle of sherry, uncorked by Pitt and bursting out with puns, invective, and fibs.

In 1780, Sheridan entered the House of Commons as the ally of Charles James Fox on the side of the American Colonials in the political debate of that year. He is said to have paid the burgesses of Stafford five guineas apiece to allow him to represent them. As a consequence, his first speech in Parliament was a defence against the charge of bribery.

In 1787 Sheridan demanded the impeachment of Warren Hastings, the first Governor-General of India. His speech in the House of Commons was described by Edmund Burke, Charles James Fox, and William Pitt as the greatest ever delivered in ancient or modern times.

In Commons, Sheridan was known as an engaging, and often entertaining orator. His speeches at the Hastings impeachment were later published as a 59-page booklet. In 1793, during the debates on the Aliens Act designed to prevent French Revolutionary spies and saboteurs from flooding into the country, Edmund Burke made a speech in which he claimed there were thousands of French agents in Britain ready to use weapons against the authorities. To dramatically emphasise his point he threw down a knife onto the floor of the House of Commons. Sheridan shouted, "Where's the fork?", which led to much of the house collapsing in laughter.

In April 1798 he appeared at the trial in Maidstone of United Irishmen accused of treasonable conspiracy with the French. Along with Charles James Fox, Lord Moira and other radical Whig grandees, he testified on behalf of Arthur O'Connor. O'Connor was acquitted. His companion, Father James Coigly was hanged.

During the invasion scare of 1803 Sheridan penned an 'Address to the People':

THEY, by a strange Frenzy driven, fight for Power, for Plunder, and extended Rule—WE, for our Country, our Altars, and our Homes.—THEY follow an ADVENTURER, whom they fear—and obey a Power which they hate—WE serve a Monarch whom we love—a God whom we adore...They call on us to barter all of Good we have inherited and proved, for the desperate Chance of Something better which they promise.—Be our plain Answer this: The Throne WE honour is the PEOPLE'S CHOICE—the Laws we reverence are our brave Fathers' Legacy—the Faith we follow teaches us to live in bonds of Charity with all Mankind, and die with Hope of Bliss beyond the Grave. Tell your Invaders this; and tell them too, we seek no Change; and, least of all, such Change as they would bring us.

He held the posts of Receiver-General of the Duchy of Cornwall (1804–1807) and Treasurer of the Navy (1806–1807). Sheridan was noted for his close political relationship with the Prince of Wales, leading a faction of his supporters in the Commons. By 1805 when the Prince was cooling on his previous support of Catholic Emancipation Sheridan, George Tierney and others announced their own opposition to it.

When, after 32 years in Parliament, he lost re-election in 1812, his creditors closed in on him and his last years were harassed by debt and disappointment. On hearing of his debts, the American Congress offered Sheridan £20,000 in recognition of his efforts to prevent the American War of Independence. He refused the offer.

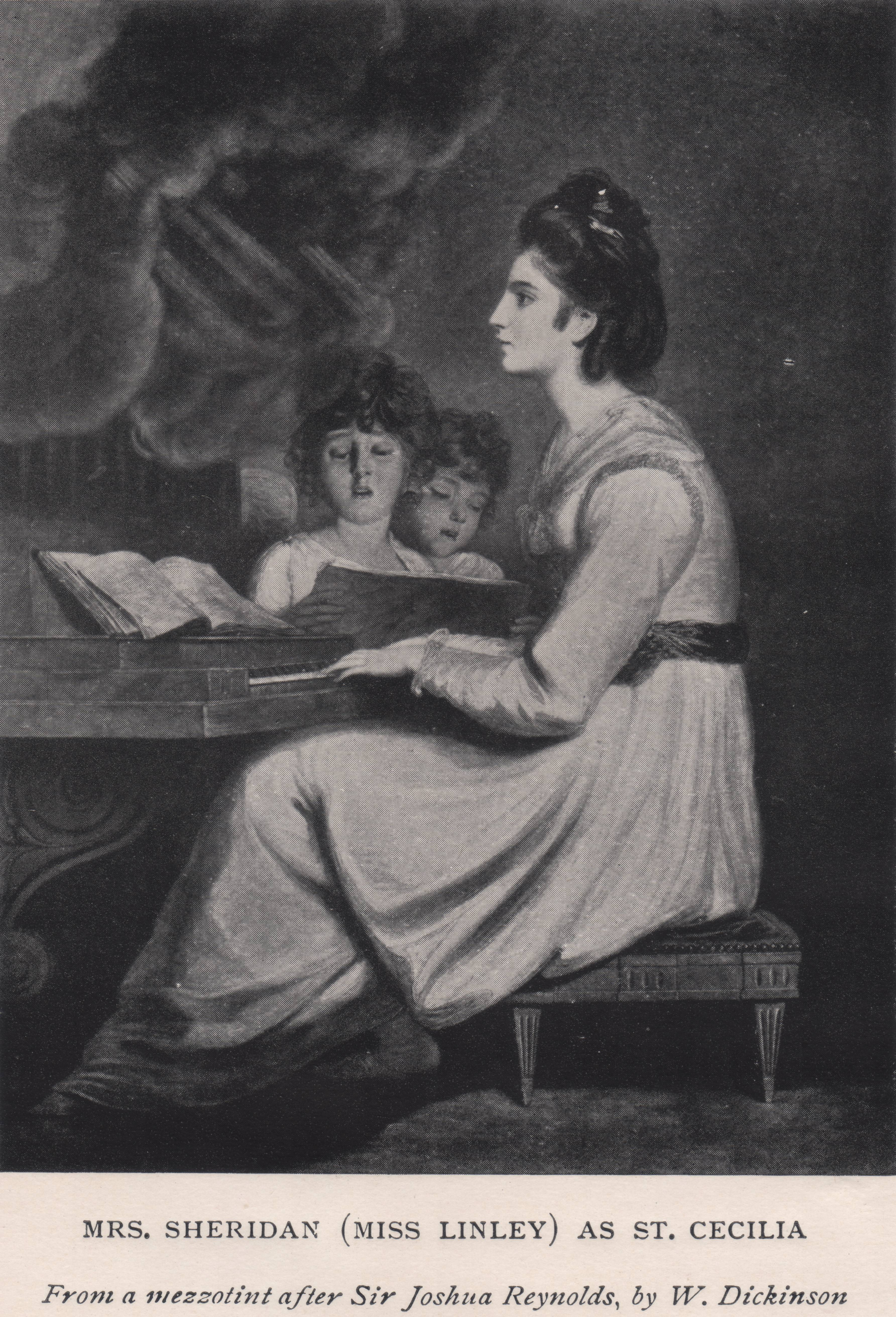
Mrs Sheridan (Miss Linley)

== Death and commemoration ==
In December 1815 Sheridan became ill and was largely confined to bed. He died in poverty. However, dukes, earls, lords, viscounts, the Lord Mayor of London, and other notables attended his funeral, and he was buried in the Poets' Corner of Westminster Abbey.

In 1825 the Irish writer Thomas Moore published a sympathetic two-volume biography, Memoirs of the Life of Richard Brinsley Sheridan, which became a major influence on subsequent perceptions. A Royal Society of Arts blue plaque was unveiled in 1881 to commemorate Sheridan at 14 Savile Row in Mayfair. Another plaque is in Stafford.

== Family life ==
He was twice married. He and his first wife Elizabeth had a son:

- Thomas (Tom) Sheridan, who married Caroline Henrietta Callander, daughter of Col. Sir James Campbell of Craigforth, Stirling, and Ardkinglas Argyll, and was the father of Helen Blackwood, Baroness Dufferin and Claneboye, Caroline Norton and Georgiana Seymour, Duchess of Somerset

Elizabeth also had a daughter, Mary, born 30 March 1792 but fathered by her lover, Lord Edward FitzGerald. After Elizabeth's death, Sheridan fulfilled his promise to look after Thomas and FitzGerald's baby daughter. A nurse was employed to care for the child at his Wanstead home. The baby had a series of fits one evening in October 1793, when she was 18 months old, dying before a doctor could attend. She was interred beside her mother at Wells Cathedral.

In 1795, Richard B. Sheridan married Esther Jane Ogle (1776–1817), daughter of the Dean of Winchester. They had at least one child: Charles Brinsley Sheridan (1796–1843). At one time Sheridan owned Downe House, Richmond Hill in London.

== Affairs ==
Sheridan was a womanizer. He had recorded affairs with Frances Crewe, Lady Crewe (he dedicated his 1777 play The School for Scandal to her), and a disastrous affair with Harriet Spencer, beginning in 1789. Sheridan's affair with Harriet was disastrous for her, as the worst-case scenario actually happened: her abusive husband Viscount Duncannon walked in on Harriet and Sheridan having intercourse. Violently enraged, Duncannon immediately wanted to divorce Harriet. Divorce in the 18th century was social ruin for women, and Harriet narrowly escaped such calamity only when Duncannon's father William Ponsonby, 2nd Earl of Bessborough and the powerful Cavendish clan sided with Harriet, making divorcing her social suicide.

Whilst attempting to win back his wife Eliza, one of multiple similar occasions, he conceived a child with a governess named Caroline Townsend in 1789. Sheridan's friends, Georgiana Cavendish, Duchess of Devonshire and Henrietta Ponsonby, Countess of Bessborough helped him arrange for Caroline to go abroad to deliver, and adopted the baby, whom they named Fanny Mortimer. Fanny "grew up at Devonshire House as a sort of foundling, inhabiting a nether world between the servants' quarters and the nursery. After Georgiana died in 1806, Harriet sent Fanny to private school and eventually saw her marry quite well. Fanny always suspected that either Harriet or Georgiana was her mother and never quite recovered from learning that her true mother was a mere governess."

== Character ==
To his contemporaries, Sheridan was as known for his dazzling wit, lively humour, and political acuity as for his duplicitousness, vindictive nastiness, and general profligacy. Sheridan was a social-climber who had no qualms about backstabbing friends to maintain his social status amongst actual aristocrats and to gain power in Whig society. Perhaps the best summary of Sheridan's character was by Sir Gilbert Elliot, Gilbert Elliot-Murray-Kynynmound, 1st Earl of Minto who observed to his wife: "He employs a great deal of art, with a great deal of pain, to gratify, not the proper passion in such affairs, but vanity; and he deals in the most intricate plotting and under plotting, like a Spanish play." By 1789, Sheridan's two-faced cunning made him despised by most of Whig society.

Like most of the ton (le bon ton), Sheridan drank heavily and was a gambling addict, gambling most nights with money he did not have. Whilst most of his fellow gambling addicts attempted to pay their creditors, Sheridan pointedly never paid his debts, as he believed paying his creditors "only encourages them."

Sheridan's behaviour towards women in particular was dishonourable. A rake and professional storyteller, he was a gifted apologiser and made promises to his wives and lovers he knew he would never keep. Sheridan sexually harassed and assaulted women. An example of this is his sexual harassment and then assault of Lady Webster, later known as Lady Holland, Elizabeth Fox, Baroness Holland. After falsely accusing her of having an affair with a man she "did not care for in the least", he threatened to ruin her by telling society of her imaginary affair. When Lady Webster did not submit to his advances, he retaliated by later assaulting her in her home. Lady Webster herself recorded the assault: "...when I defied [his] threat he took another most extraordinary method – I was told one day that a servant had brought a message which he would deliver to no one but myself, and before I could order him to be admitted, in entered Sheridan, wrapped up in a great watchcoat, and after my servant had quitted the room he rushed up to me and with a ferociousness quite frightful bit my cheek so violently that the blood ran on down my neck – I had just enough sense to ring the bell and he withdrew."

By 1802, Sheridan's despicable behaviour took an even more sinister turn, and he began harassing one of his few remaining friends, Harriet Spencer, Henrietta Ponsonby, Countess of Bessborough. In 1805, Sheridan had escalated his harassment of Harriet to anonymously sending her threatening letters; as they had been longtime friends and former lovers, Harriet quickly deduced the author's identity as Sheridan's from his handwriting. Sheridan accosted Harriet in public and made a scene any chance he could, reproaching her for not loving him enough and declaring his undying love for her. Despite his cruelty towards her, Harriet was kind to him on his deathbed in 1816. In return, Sheridan grasped her hand hard and told her he would haunt her after his death. Harriet, petrified, asked why, having persecuted her all his life, he was determined to continue his persecution after death. "Because I am resolved you shall remember me." After enduring a few more minutes of his terror, Harriet fled the room. Three days later, Richard Brinsley Sheridan died alone.

== Works ==
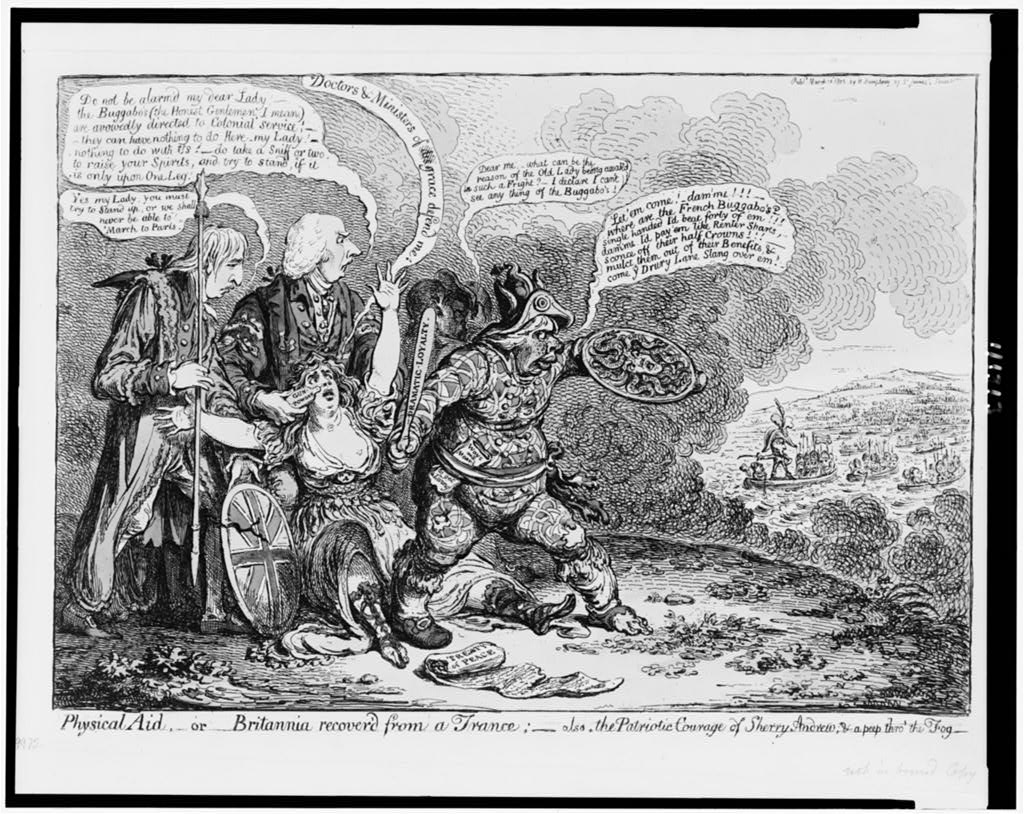
Physical Aid,—or—Britannia recover'd from a Trance;—also, the Patriotic Courage of Sherry Andrew; & a peep thro' the Fog (1803) by James Gillray, showing Sheridan as a Silenus-like and ragged Harlequin defending Henry Addington and Lord Hawkesbury on the Dover coast from the advancing French rowboats filled with French soldiers, led by Napoleon. Sheridan says: "Let 'em come! damn'me!!!—Where are the French Buggabo's? Single handed I'd beat forty of 'em!!! dam'me I'd pay 'em like Renter Shares, sconce off their half Crowns!!!—mulct them out of their Benefits, &c, come Drury Lane Slang over em!."

- The Rivals (1775)
- St Patrick's Day (1775)
- The Duenna (1775)
- A Trip to Scarborough (1777)
- The School for Scandal (1777)
- The Camp (1778)
- The Critic (1779)
- The Glorious First of June (1794)
- Pizarro (1799)
- Clio's Protest (written 1771, published 1819)

He also wrote a selection of poems and political speeches during his time in parliament.

== Adaptations and cultural references ==
- Sheridan is played by Barry Stanton in the film The Madness of King George (1994). In The Duchess (2008), a film based on the life of Georgiana Cavendish, Duchess of Devonshire, Sheridan is played by Aidan McArdle and The School for Scandal is performed in the movie.
- Frederick Douglass references one of Sheridan’s speeches on behalf of Catholic emancipation that he repeatedly read as a child as greatly influencing both his oratory skills and abolitionist views in his Narrative of the Life.
- Chris Humphreys has used the character of Jack Absolute from The Rivals as a basis for his books The Blooding of Jack Absolute, Absolute Honour and Jack Absolute. These are published under the name C. C. Humphreys.
- Sheridan was a village in Toronto Township, Ontario, named for R. B. Sheridan. Its name was later used by a neighbourhood, Sheridan Homelands, which is now part of the City of Mississauga. Sheridan was shortlisted as the name of the newly incorporated city in 1974, which lies just west of the province's capital city of Toronto.
- In Jules Verne's novel Around the World in 80 Days, the protagonist, Phileas Fogg, is said to live at "No. 7 Savile Row, Burlington Gardens, the house in which Sheridan died in 1814." While Sheridan did indeed live in Savile Row, he lived at No. 14 rather than at No. 7 (and he died in 1816, not in 1814 as claimed in the book).

== See also ==
- Sheridan Le Fanu

== Notes ==
Political offices
Preceded by George Canning	Treasurer of the Navy; 1806–1807	Succeeded by George Rose
Parliament of Great Britain
Parliament of the United Kingdom
Preceded by Richard Whitworth	Member of Parliament for Stafford; 1780–1806	Succeeded by Richard Mansel-Philipps
Preceded by Earl Percy	Member of Parliament for Westminster; 1806–1807	Succeeded by Lord Cochrane
Preceded by Sir William Manners	Member of Parliament for Ilchester; 1807–1812	Succeeded by Lord Ward
