= Helen Blackwood, Baroness Dufferin and Claneboye =

British songwriter, composer, poet and author

Helen Selina Blackwood Baroness Dufferin and Claneboye Countess of Gifford
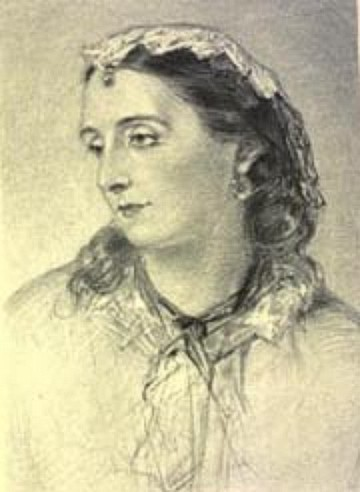
- Born: Helen Selina Sheridan; 18 January 1807
- Died: 13 June 1867 (aged 60); Highgate, London
- Resting place: Friern Barnet
- Citizenship: Ireland
- Occupations: Songwriter, poet
- Notable work: "The Irish Emigrant"; Finesse, or, A Busy Day in Messina
- Spouses: Price Blackwood (m. 1825; died 1841); George Hay (m. 1862; died 1862)
- Children: 1, Frederick
- Parents: Thomas Sheridan (father); Caroline Henrietta Sheridan (mother)
- Relatives: Richard Brinsley Sheridan (brother); Caroline Norton (sister); Georgiana Seymour (sister); Richard Brinsley Sheridan (grandfather)

A songsheet for The Lament of the Irish Emigrant printed in New York says "A Ballad – Poetry by the Hon. Mrs. Price Blackwood".

Helen Selina Blackwood, Baroness Dufferin and Claneboye (née Sheridan, 18 January 1807 – 13 June 1867), later Countess of Gifford, was an Irish songwriter, composer, poet, and author. Admired for her wit and literary talents, she was a well-known figure in London society of the mid-19th century.

== Childhood and marriage ==
Helen Sheridan came from a literary and theatrical family with political connections. Her father, Thomas Sheridan (1775–1817), an actor, soldier and colonial administrator, was the younger son of famous Irish playwright Richard Brinsley Sheridan, and her mother was Caroline Henrietta Sheridan (née Callander), a novelist. In 1813, Thomas took Helen and his wife with him to a post at the Cape of Good Hope, where he died four years later on 12 September 1817. Helen then returned to England, where she lived in a Hampton Court Palace "grace and favour" apartment with her mother, four brothers and two younger sisters. The sisters' beauty and accomplishments led to them being called the "Three Graces". Caroline was known as the wittiest of the girls and later developed into a talented writer, and Georgiana, considered the prettiest of the sisters, later became Duchess of Somerset by marriage to Edward Seymour, 12th Duke of Somerset.

At seventeen, Helen was engaged to Commander Price Blackwood, youngest of three sons of the 3rd Baron Dufferin and Claneboye, and Mehetabel Temple; owing to the deaths of his brothers he was to be the future Lord Dufferin, although his parents wanted him to marry more advantageously, mainly based on financial grounds. After their London wedding at St. George's, Hanover Square, London, on 4 July 1825, they went to live in Florence due to the opposition of the marriage by the Blackwood family, but returned two years later with their baby son Frederick, who was born on 21 June 1826. Her sisters introduced her to fashionable circles where she mixed with prominent figures of the time, Mary Berry, Samuel Rogers, Henry Taylor, Brougham, Sydney Smith, and Benjamin Disraeli; Disraeli in later life said she had been "his chief admiration". In 1839, she became Lady Dufferin when her husband inherited his title. He died in 1841 of an accidental morphine overdose; Helen continued to spend her summers at his family estate at Clandeboye in Ireland, which now belonged to Frederick.

In October 1862, she agreed to marry her friend George Hay, Earl of Gifford by special license, after he was seriously injured in an accident. Hay, who was heir to the Marquessate of Tweeddale, died of his injuries two months after their marriage.

== Writing ==
From childhood Helen had written poems, songs and prologues for private theatrical productions. After she and Caroline jointly brought out a Set of ten Songs and two Duets, she started to publish her verse, sometimes set to her own music. Her name was not usually printed at first, but she did not stay entirely anonymous. One of her most popular ballads was The Irish Emigrant, which was published in New York and Boston as well as in London. In this and in other work written around the time of the great Irish famine she shows some understanding of "the destructive impact of the famine on love and the family" despite her "social distance", though one critic believes the Irish people's suffering is merely "hinted at" in this "ballad for the English middle class". Alfred Perceval Graves, writing in the early 20th century, was more enthusiastic: "…her warm heart beats in such close sympathy with her peasant neighbours that… she writes as if she were one of themselves, while her sense of fun floats through her Irish poems with a delicate breeziness."

In 1863 a play of hers was staged, and in the same year she published an account of her travels up the Nile with her son. This poked fun at writing by lady travellers; the title Lispings from Low Latitudes, or, Extracts from the Journal of the Hon. Impulsia Gushington echoed Frederick's book Letters From High Latitudes. The purpose of the play was to satire travel literature, specifically that of women, during the time period. Her play, Finesse, or, A Busy Day in Messina, produced at the Haymarket Theatre with John Baldwin Buckstone as one of the actors, was a success, but the writer did not go to any of the performances, nor acknowledge her authorship. Dufferin's poetry, often set to music by herself or others, reflects important concerns traceable throughout the early and middle periods of Victorian literature: a biting criticism of social class, a spotlight on Irish poverty and emigration, and a despair over loss and separation. While Dufferin infused her early and later writing with an arch wit (particularly in her social satires), the songs and poems written during the middle of her life are marked by sentimentality and often a profound sadness.

In relation to her writing, the Westminster Review gave a very good approximation of her literary skill and emotion laden works. "Of the songs and verses which have been collected in the volume it must be confessed that few of them rise above respectable mediocrity. "The Irish Emigrant" is her best song, and is full of true feeling. "Sweet Kilkenny Town" is intensely Irish, and might fittingly be sung by any of the obscure thousands from Erin who toil for bare existence in the great Republic of the West. In many of her other lyrics we find an echo of Moore, but she lacks his perfection of form and exquisite imagery. It is when she writes in the vernacular that she is in her happiest vein. She sympathised with the peasantry of the land in which she was born, and the great charm of her nature lay, not in the gift of genius—for that she did not possess—but in her sweet and loving Irish heart. That she was endowed with some dramatic power is shown by her comedy, entitled Finesse; or, a Busy Day in Messina. She cannot take rank in literature beside her gifted sister, Mrs. Norton, but her womanhood was richer and more perfect than that of many members of her sex to whom was given "the vision and the faculty divine." It is right that the world should know something of one of the womanliest women that ever breathed, and for this reason Lord Dufferin's biography and the verses which accompany it will be treasured in many homes". Despite her nineteenth-century popularity, Dufferin's work is now largely obscured, in part by the current critical focus on her sister, Caroline Norton.

== Death ==
She died of breast cancer on 13 June 1867, at age 60, at Dufferin Lodge in Highgate and was buried in Friern Barnet with her second husband. Her son Frederick, who had always had a close and affectionate relationship with his mother, published a volume of Songs, Poems, & Verses by Helen, Lady Dufferin with a memoir in 1894. Earlier he had named the village and railway station built on his land Helen's Bay, and he dedicated Helen's Tower on the Clandeboye Estate to her. The tower inspired poems by both Tennyson and Browning who compared this Helen favourably with the beautiful Helen of Troy of legend:

Like hers, thy face once made all eyes elate,
Yet, unlike hers, was bless'd by every glance.

== Poems online ==
- Lament of the Irish Emigrant
- Terence's Farewell
- Love hath a language, from To my Son
- The Charming Woman
