= James Grimston, 3rd Earl of Verulam =

British Conservative Party politician (1852–1924)

James Walter Grimston, 3rd Earl of Verulam (11 May 1852 – 11 November 1924), known as Viscount Grimston from 1852 to 1895, was a British Conservative Party politician who sat in the House of Commons from 1885 to 1892. He inherited his peerage in 1895.

== Biography ==
Grimston was the eldest son of James Walter Grimston, 2nd Earl of Verulam. He was educated at Harrow School and became a lieutenant in the 1st Life Guards. He became J.P. for Hertfordshire and captain in the Hertfordshire Yeoman Cavalry.

Grimston was elected as the Member of Parliament (MP) for St Albans in the 1885 general election, and held the seat until he retired from the Commons at 1892 election.

In 1895 he succeeded his father in the earldom and entered the House of Lords.

== Marriage and issue ==
Lord Verulam married Margaret Frances Graham, daughter of Sir Frederick Ulric Graham of Netherby, 3rd Baronet, and wife Lady Jane Hermione Seymour (daughter of Edward Seymour, 12th Duke of Somerset, and wife Jane Georgiana Sheridan), and widow of Alexander Aeneas Mackintosh, in 1878. They had six daughters and one son:

- Lady Helen Grimston (1879–1947)
- James Walter Grimston, 4th Earl of Verulam (1880–1949)
- Lady Hermione Grimston (1881–1924)
- Aline Grimston (1883–?)
- Elizabeth Grimston (1885–1975); married to Hesketh Hesketh-Prichard
- Lady Sibyl Grimston (1887–1968); married to Major The Hon. Alastair Thomas Joseph Fraser, son of Simon Fraser, 13th Lord Lovat, and wife Alice Mary Weld-Blundell
- Lady Vera Grimston (1890–1970)

Lord Verulam died in November 1924, aged 72, and was succeeded in his titles by his son James. Lady Verulam died in 1927.

== Descendants ==
Scottish actress Rose Leslie is a matrilineal great-great-granddaughter of Verulam, through his second-youngest daughter.

== Notes ==
Parliament of the United Kingdom
New constituency	Member of Parliament for St Albans; 1885 – 1892	Succeeded by Vicary Gibbs
Peerage of the United Kingdom
Preceded by James Walter Grimston	Earl of Verulam; 1895 – 1924	Succeeded by James Walter Grimston
