= Caroline Henrietta Sheridan =

English novelist

Caroline Henrietta Sheridan (née Callander; 1779 – 9 June 1851) was an English novelist of the 19th century.

== Biography ==
Caroline Callander was second daughter of Colonel James Callander (afterwards Sir James Campbell), by his third wife, Lady Elizabeth Helena (d. 1851), youngest daughter of Alexander Macdonnell, fifth earl of Antrim. Miss Callander, one of the beauties of her day, was married in 1805 to Thomas Sheridan, the son of Richard Brinsley Sheridan and his wife Elizabeth Ann Linley, and by him she was mother of the politician Richard Brinsley Sheridan and 'the three beauties', Helen Blackwood, Baroness Dufferin and Claneboye; the feminist Caroline Norton; and Georgiana Seymour, Duchess of Somerset.

The only extant account of Caroline Sheridan's character is contained in a letter written from Inveraray Castle by Matthew Lewis to his mother: "Mrs. T. Sheridan is very pretty, very sensible, amiable, and gentle; indeed so gentle that Tom insists upon it, that her extreme quietness and tranquillity is a defect in her character. Above all, he accuses her of such an extreme apprehension of giving trouble (he says) it amounts to absolute affectation".

She accompanied her husband in 1813 to the Cape of Good Hope, where, while serving the office of colonial treasurer, he died of consumption on 12 September 1817. She received a small pension, and rooms at Hampton Court Palace were given to her by the prince regent. There she reared and educated her four sons and three daughters. After her children were grown up, Frances Kemble wrote in Records of a Girlhood: "Mrs. Sheridan, the mother of the Graces, is more beautiful than anybody but her daughters".

She published three novels which – according to the Dictionary of National Biography – pleased the public. The first was Carwell, or Crime and Sorrow (1830), which was designed to expose the inequitable sentences pronounced upon those who had been guilty of forgery. The second was Aims and Ends (1833); and the third, Oonagh Lynch (1833). Soon after publication, Carwell was translated into French and published in Paris.

She died on 9 June 1851, at 39 Grosvenor Place, in the house of her daughter, Lady Dufferin.

== Notes ==
This article incorporates text from a publication now in the public domain: Rae, William Fraser (1897). "Sheridan, Caroline Henrietta". In Lee, Sidney (ed.). Dictionary of National Biography. Vol. 52. London: Smith, Elder & Co.
