= Violet Graham, Duchess of Montrose =

British philanthropist and anti-suffragist (1854–1940)

Her Grace The Duchess of Montrose
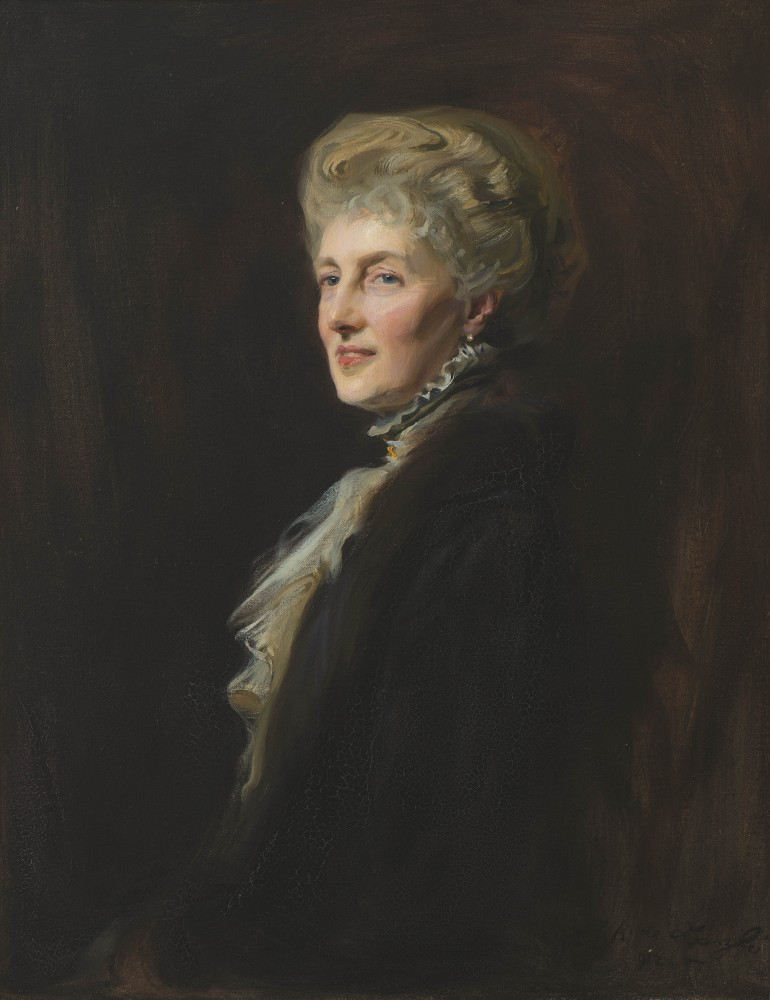
- Portrait by Philip de László, 1912.

Personal details
- Born: Violet Graham; 10 September 1854
- Died: 21 November 1940 (aged 86)
- Spouse: Douglas Graham, 5th Duke of Montrose (m. 1876)
- Children: James Graham, 6th Duke of Montrose; Lady Helen Violet Graham; Lady Hermione Graham; Lord Douglas Graham; Lord Alasitair Graham
- Parent(s): Sir Frederick Graham, 3rd Baronet; Lady Jane St Maur

Violet Hermione Graham, Duchess of Montrose, GBE (10 September 1854 – 21 November 1940) was a British philanthropist and anti-suffragist. She served as president of the Scottish branch of the Women's National Anti-Suffrage League. Her husband was Douglas Graham, 5th Duke of Montrose.

== Early life and marriage ==
Violet Graham was born in London in 1854, the eldest daughter of Sir Frederick Graham, 3rd Baronet of Netherby and Lady Jane Hermione St Maur, daughter of Edward St Maur, 12th Duke of Somerset. She married the 5th Duke of Montrose, a Scottish nobleman, in 1876. Together they lived at the Clan Graham's Buchanan Castle in Scotland.

The Duchess and her husband had five children:

- James Graham, 6th Duke of Montrose (1878–1954)
- Lady Helen Violet Graham (1879–1945)
- Lady Hermione Emily Graham (1882–1978)
- Brigadier Lord Douglas Malise Graham (1883–1974)
- Captain Lord Alastair Mungo Graham (1886–1976)

The Duchess was a canopy bearer for Queen Alexandra at the Queen's coronation. In 1911, she was one of four women who carried the canopy over Queen Mary at the latter's coronation.

== Philanthropic work ==
The Duchess held several leadership positions with philanthropic organizations, including serving as president of the Soldier's and Sailor's Families Association of Scotland beginning in 1900, vice-president of the Territorial Force Nursing Service in 1908, and president of Scottish Red Cross beginning in 1909. She was also involved in charitable efforts focused on children. She commissioned a home for underprivileged children built in Loch Lomond in 1891.

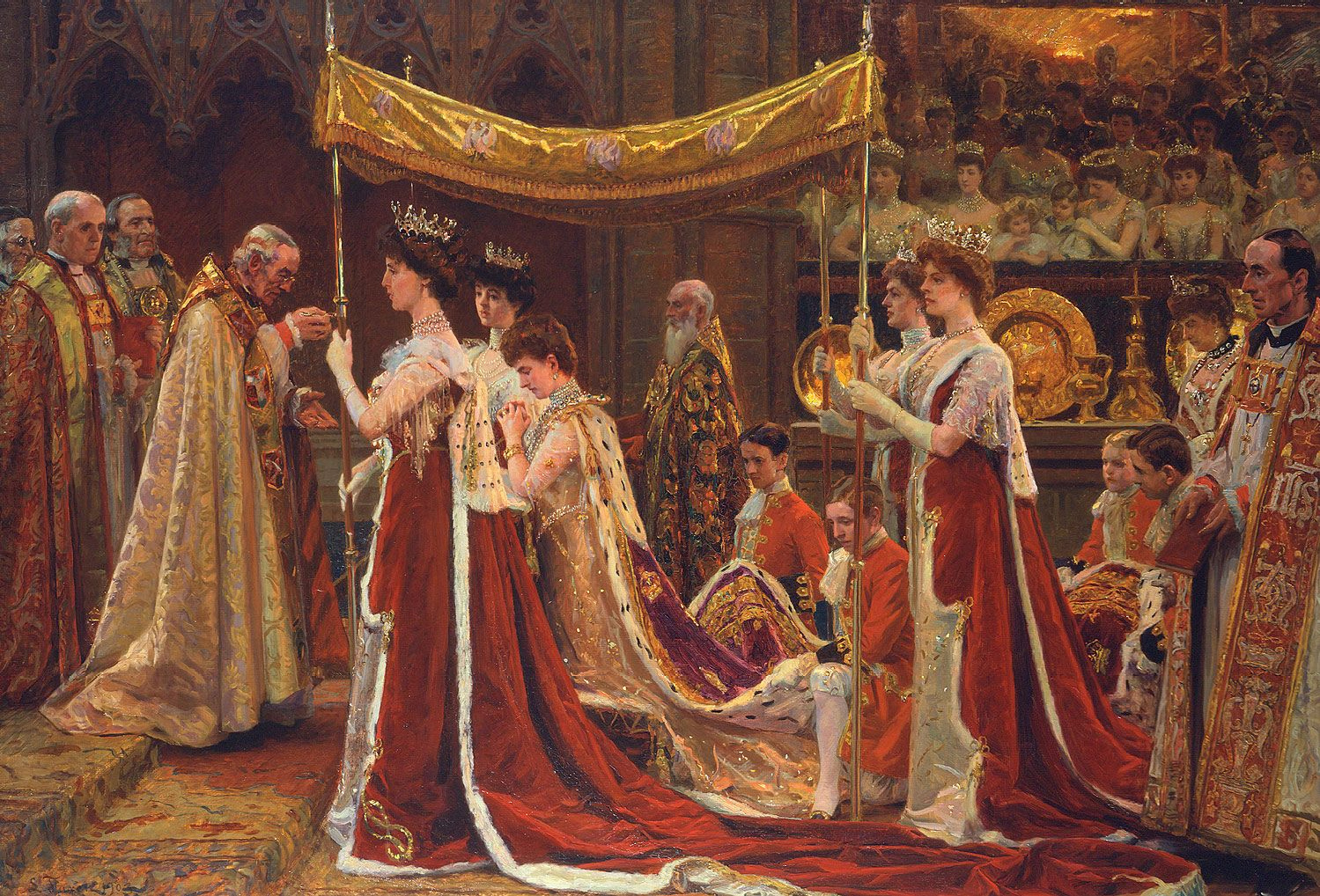
The Duchess of Montrose appears as a canopy bearer in the painting The Anointing of Queen Alexandra at the Coronation of King Edward VII by Laurits Tuxen

== Anti-suffragist work ==
The Women's National Anti-Suffrage League was founded in 1908, marking the beginning of organized opposition to women's suffrage in the United Kingdom. The Duchess of Montrose became the leader of the Scottish National Anti-Suffrage League in 1910 when it became a formal affiliate of the English organization and was a high-profile advocate for the cause. Writing in the Anti-Suffrage Review, the Duchess described the goal of the Scottish league as convincing women "of the danger to the State if votes were given to large numbers of inexperienced women." Graham spoke at the Women's National Anti-Suffrage League's Annual Council in July 1910. She was also member of Mary Ward's Local Government Advancement Committee in 1912.

== Awards and recognition ==
The Duchess of Montrose was granted an Honorary Doctor of Laws from the University of Glasgow in 1907. She was awarded the GBE in 1918, the second year of the order's existence, while serving as the president of the Scottish branch of the British Red Cross Society. A high society profile of the Duchess published in 1904 described her as "the uncrowned queen of Glasgow." Montrose Cape, in the Hudson Strait, is named after her.
