= Caroline Norton =

English social reformer and writer (1808–1877)

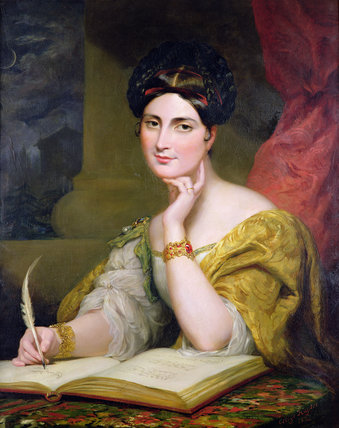
- Caroline Norton, by Sir George Hayter in 1832
- Born: Caroline Elizabeth Sarah Sheridan; 22 March 1808; London, England
- Died: 15 June 1877 (aged 69); London, England
- Known for: Social reformer, writer
- Title: Lady Stirling-Maxwell (1877)
- Spouses: George Chapple Norton (m. 1827; died 1875) Sir William Stirling-Maxwell, 9th Baronet (m. 1877)
- Parent(s): Thomas Sheridan; Caroline Henrietta Sheridan

Caroline Elizabeth Sarah Norton, Lady Stirling-Maxwell (née Sheridan; 22 March 1808 – 15 June 1877) was an active English social reformer and author. She left her husband, who was accused by many of coercive behaviour, in 1836. Her husband then sued her close friend Lord Melbourne, then the Whig Prime Minister, for criminal conversation (adultery).

Although the jury found her friend not guilty of adultery, she failed to gain a divorce and was denied access to her three sons due to the laws at the time which favoured fathers. Norton's campaigning led to the passage of the Custody of Infants Act 1839, the Matrimonial Causes Act 1857 and the Married Women's Property Act 1870. She modelled for the fresco of Justice in the House of Lords by Daniel Maclise, who chose her as a famous victim of injustice.

== Youth and marriage ==
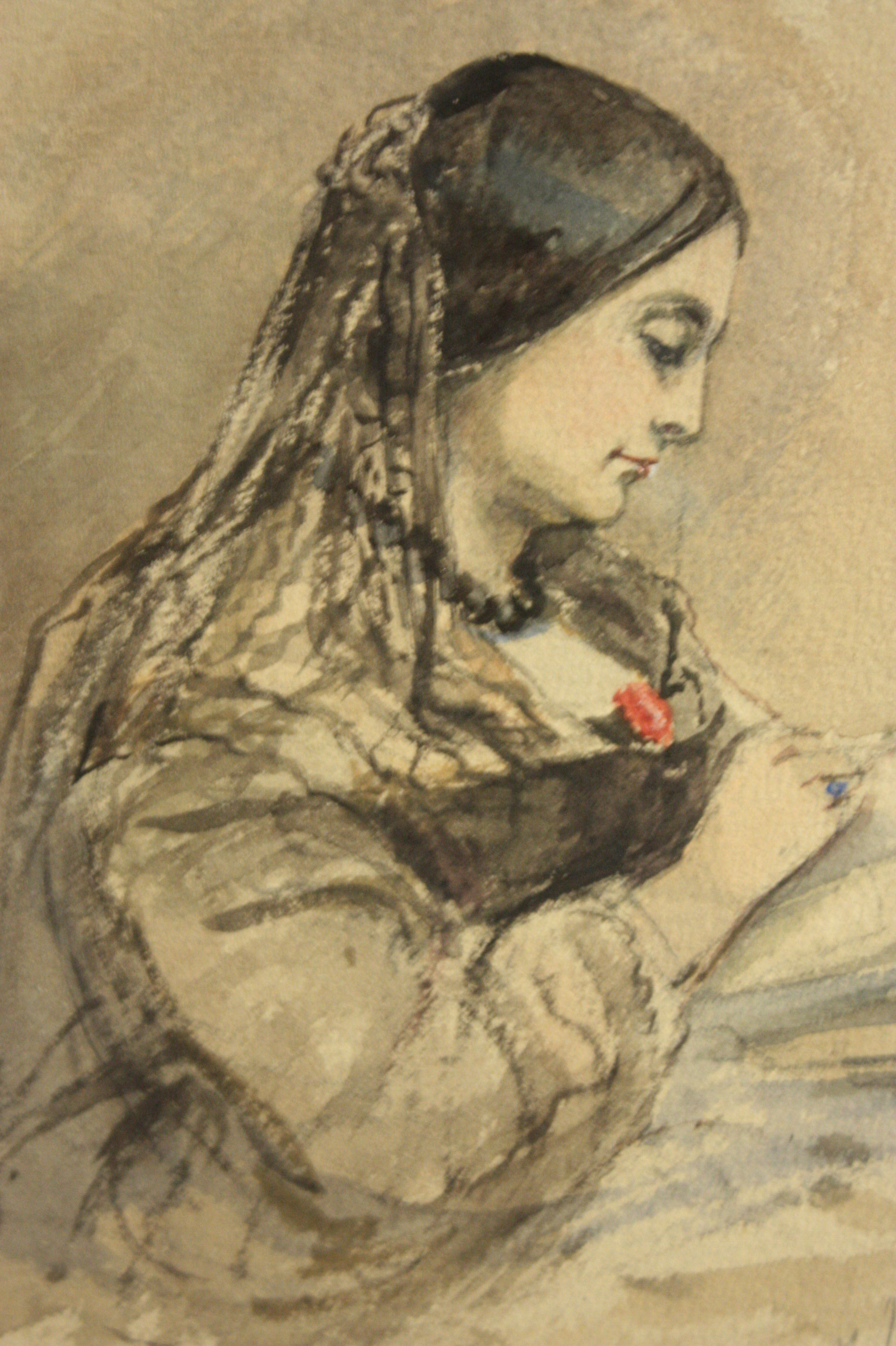
Watercolour sketch of Caroline Norton by Emma Fergusson 1860, National Portrait Gallery of Scotland

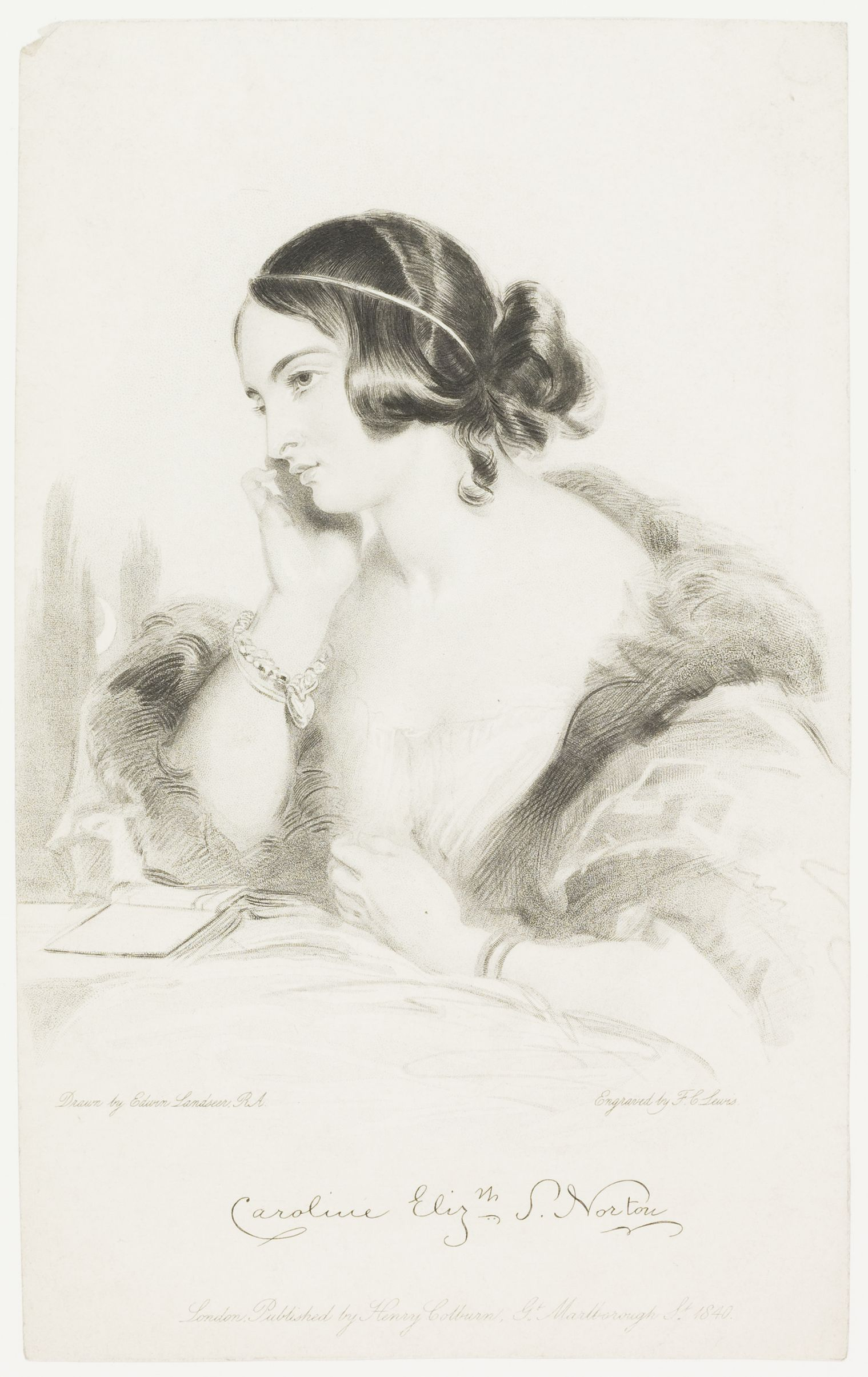
Portrait engraving of Caroline Norton from the frontispiece of one of her books

Caroline Norton was born in London to Thomas Sheridan and the novelist Caroline Henrietta Callander. Her father was an actor, soldier and colonial administrator, the son of the prominent Irish playwright and Whig statesman Richard Brinsley Sheridan and his wife Elizabeth Ann Linley. Caroline's Scottish mother was the daughter of a landed gentleman, Col. Sir James Callander of Craigforth and Lady Elizabeth MacDonnell, sister of an Irish peer, the 1st Marquess of Antrim. Mrs. Sheridan authored three short novels described by one of her daughter's biographers as "rather stiff with the style of the eighteenth century, but none without a certain charm and wit...."

In 1817, her father died in South Africa while serving as colonial secretary at the Cape of Good Hope. His family was left almost penniless. Prince Frederick, Duke of York and Albany, an old friend of her grandfather, arranged for them to live at Hampton Court Palace in a "grace and favour" apartment for several years.

The combined beauty and accomplishments of the Sheridan sisters led to their being collectively referred to as the Three "Graces". The eldest, Helen, was a songwriter who married Price Blackwood, the 4th Baron Dufferin and Claneboye. Through her, Caroline became the aunt of Frederick Hamilton-Temple-Blackwood, 1st Marquess of Dufferin and Ava, later the third Governor General of Canada and eighth Viceroy of India. Her younger sister, Georgiana, seen as the prettiest, later married Edward Seymour, 12th Duke of Somerset.

In 1827, she married George Chapple Norton, barrister, Member of Parliament for Guildford, and the younger brother of Lord Grantley. George was a jealous and possessive husband given to violent fits of drunkenness. The union quickly proved unhappy due to his mental and physical abuse. To make matters worse, George was unsuccessful as a barrister, and the couple fought bitterly over money.

During her early married years, Caroline used her beauty, wit and political ties to set herself up as a major society hostess. Her unorthodox behaviour and candid conversation raised many eyebrows in 19th-century English high society; she made enemies and admirers in almost equal measure. Among her friends were literary and political luminaries such as Samuel Rogers, Edward Bulwer-Lytton, Edward Trelawny, Abraham Hayward, Mary Shelley, Fanny Kemble, Benjamin Disraeli, the future King Leopold I of Belgium and William Cavendish, 6th Duke of Devonshire. She also claimed in later life to have taken part in the Tolpuddle Martyrs protest march in 1834.

Despite his jealousy and pride, George encouraged his wife to use her ties to advance his career. It was through her influence that in 1831 he was made a Metropolitan Police Magistrate. During these years, Caroline turned to prose and poetry as means of releasing her inner emotions and earning money. Her first book, The Sorrows of Rosalie (1829), was well received. The Undying One (1830), a romance founded on the legend of the Wandering Jew, soon followed. From 1832 to 1837, she edited The Court Magazine and Belle Assemblée. In 1843, she petitioned Sir Robert Peel for the post of Poet Laureate after the death of Robert Southey, but was unsuccessful.

== Separation and Melbourne scandal ==
In 1836, Caroline left her husband. She managed to subsist on her earnings as an author, but George claimed these as his, arguing this successfully in court. Paid nothing by her husband and her earnings confiscated, Norton used the law to her own advantage. Running up bills in her husband's name, she told the creditors when they came to collect, that if they wished to be paid, they could sue her husband.

Not long after their separation, George abducted their sons, hiding them with relatives in Scotland and later in Yorkshire, refusing to tell Caroline their whereabouts. George accused Caroline of involvement in an ongoing affair with a close friend, Lord Melbourne, then Whig Prime Minister. Initially, George demanded £10,000 from Melbourne, but Melbourne refused to be blackmailed and George instead took the Prime Minister to court.

Lord Melbourne wrote to Lord Holland, "The fact is [that George] is a stupid brute, and [Caroline] had not temper nor dissimulation enough to enable her to manage him." Despite this admission, hoping to avert an even worse scandal, he pleaded with Caroline to return to George, insisting that "a woman should never part from her husband whilst she can remain with him." Lord Melbourne relented a few days later, stating that he understood her decision to leave:

This conduct upon his part seems perfectly unaccountable...You know that I have always counselled you to bear everything and remain to the last. I thought it for the best. I am afraid it is no longer possible. Open breaches of this kind are always to be lamented, but you have the consolation that you have done your utmost to stave this extremity off as long as possible.

At the end of a nine-day trial, the jury threw out George's claim, siding with Melbourne, but the publicity almost brought down the government. The scandal eventually died, but not before Caroline's reputation was ruined and her friendship with Melbourne destroyed. George continued to keep Caroline from seeing her three sons and blocked her from receiving a divorce. Under English law in 1836, children were the legal property of their father and there was little Caroline could do to regain custody.

== Political activity ==
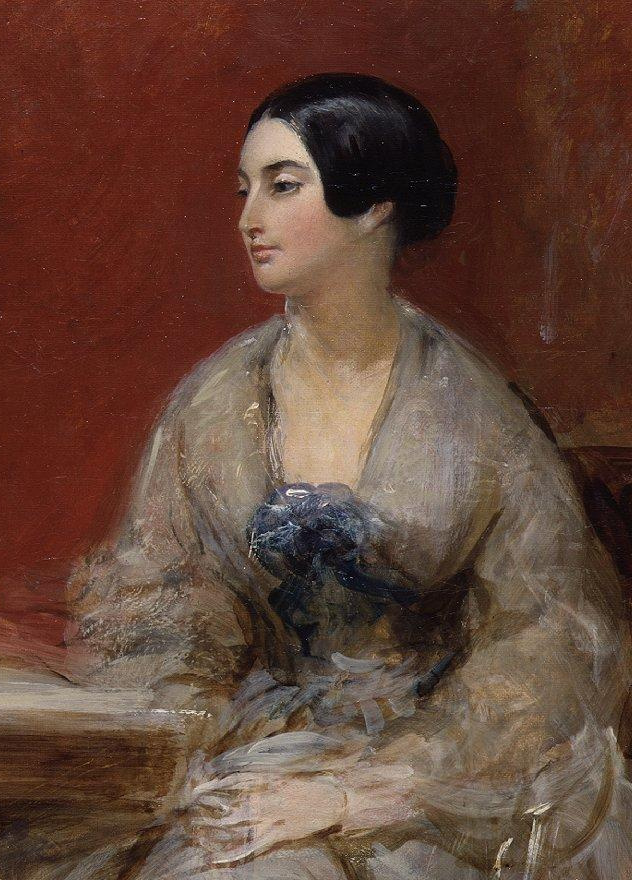
Caroline Norton, detail of a portrait by Frank Stone, c. 1845

Caroline soon faced an additional tragedy; the death of her youngest son, William, in 1842. The child, out riding alone, fell from his horse and was injured. According to Caroline, the child's wounds were minor, but they were not properly treated and blood-poisoning set in. George, realising that the child was near death, sent for Caroline. Unfortunately, William died before she arrived in Yorkshire. Caroline blamed George for the child's death, accusing him of neglect. After William's death, George allowed Caroline to visit their sons, but he retained full custody and all of her visits were supervised.

Due to her dismal domestic situation, Caroline became deeply involved in the passage of laws promoting social justice, especially those granting rights to married and divorced women. Her poems "A Voice from the Factories" (1836) and "The Child of the Islands" (1845) centred on her political views.

When Parliament debated divorce reform in 1855, Caroline submitted to members a detailed account of her own marriage, and described the difficulties faced by women as the result of existing laws.

An English wife may not leave her husband's house. Not only can he sue her for restitution of "conjugal rights," but he has a right to enter the house of any friend or relation with whom she may take refuge...and carry her away by force...

If her husband take proceedings for a divorce, she is not, in the first instance, allowed to defend herself...She is not represented by attorney, nor permitted to be considered a party to the suit between him and her supposed lover, for "damages."

If an English wife be guilty of infidelity, her husband can divorce her so as to marry again; but she cannot divorce the husband, a vinculo, however profligate he may be....

Those dear children, the loss of whose pattering steps and sweet occasional voices made the silence of [my] new home intolerable as the anguish of death...what I suffered respecting those children, God knows ... under the evil law which suffered any man, for vengeance or for interest, to take baby children from the mother.

Mainly through Caroline's intense campaigning, which included a letter to Queen Victoria, Parliament passed the Custody of Infants Act 1839, the Matrimonial Causes Act 1857 and the Married Women's Property Act 1870, which she worked on with the suffragist Barbara Bodichon. One recent biographer, Diane Atkinson, notes that unlike in 1839 and 1857, Caroline played no part in campaigning for the 1870 Act. Under the Custody of Children Act, legally separated or divorced wives, provided they were not found guilty of criminal conversation, were granted the custody of their children up to the age of seven, and periodic access thereafter. The Act applied in England, Wales and Ireland only. While Caroline could have hoped for custody of her youngest son, and access to her older sons who were seven and ten when the Act was passed into law, her husband insisted that they stay in Scotland.

The Act gave married women, for the first time, a right to their children. However, because women needed to petition in the Court of Chancery, in practice few women had the financial means to exert their rights. The Matrimonial Causes Act reformed the law on divorce, among others making divorce more affordable, and established a model of marriage based on contract. The Married Women's Property Act 1870 allowed married women to inherit property and take court action on their own behalf. The Act granted married women in the UK, for the first time, a separate legal identity from their husband.

In 1849 Daniel Maclise finished his fresco of Justice in the House of Lords, for which Caroline had modelled. He chose her as one seen by many as a famous victim of injustice. Caroline's old friend Lord Melbourne opposed the reforms she fought for. He was scolded for his opposition by Queen Victoria; the Queen wrote that he defended his actions, stating: "I don't think you should give a woman too much right... there should not be two conflicting powers... a man ought to have the right in a family."

While Caroline fought to extend women's legal rights, she eschewed further social activism and had no interest in the 19th-century women's movement on issues such as women's suffrage. In fact, in an article published in The Times in 1838, she countered a claim that she was a "radical": "The natural position of woman is inferiority to man. Amen! That is a thing of God's appointing, not of man's devising. I believe it sincerely, as part of my religion. I never pretended to the wild and ridiculous doctrine of equality."

== Later life ==
Caroline is said to have had a five-year affair with a prominent Conservative politician Sidney Herbert in the early 1840s, but Herbert married another woman in 1846. In middle age, she befriended the author George Meredith. She served as the inspiration for Diana Warwick, the intelligent, fiery-tempered heroine of Meredith's novel Diana of the Crossways, published in 1885. Caroline finally became free with George Norton's death in 1875. She married an old friend, the Scottish historical writer and politician Sir W. Stirling Maxwell in March 1877. Caroline died in London three months later.

== Family and descendants ==
Caroline's eldest son, Fletcher Norton, died of tuberculosis in Paris at the age of 30. She was devastated by the loss.

In 1854, her remaining son, Thomas Brinsley Norton, married a young Italian, Maria Chiara Elisa Federigo, whom he met in Naples. Thomas also suffered from poor health, and spent much of his life as an invalid, reliant upon his mother for financial assistance. Despite this, he lived long enough to succeed his uncle as 4th Baron Grantley of Markenfield. Lord Grantley also predeceased his mother, dying in 1877.

Thomas's son was John Norton, 5th Baron Grantley, (1855–1943). He was known as an antiquary and numismatist.

== Commemoration ==
In April 2021 English Heritage announced that Caroline Norton was one of six women to be honoured that year with a blue plaque marking her central London home for over 30 years. It was unveiled on 3 Chesterfield Street, Mayfair by Antonia Fraser.

== Depictions ==
Penelope Wilton played Caroline Norton in Child in a Dark Wood, an audio drama by Ellen Dryden about her relationship with her husband and children. The play was broadcast on BBC Radio 4 in 1983 and after rediscovery again on BBC Radio 4 Extra in 2026.

== Work ==
=== Political pamphlets ===
- A Voice from the Factories, 1836
- Separation of Mother and Child by the Laws of Custody of Infants Considered, 1837
- A Plain Letter to the Lord Chancellor on the Infant Custody Bill, 1839
- Letters to the Mob, 1848
- English Laws for Women in the Nineteenth Century, 1854
- A Letter to the Queen on Lord Chancellor Cranworth's Marriage & Divorce Bill, 1855
- A Review of the Divorce Bill of 1856, with propositions for an amendment of the laws affecting married persons, 1857

=== Poetry collections ===
- The Sorrows of Rosalie: A Tale with Other Poems, 1829
- I Do Not Love Thee, 1829
- The Cold Change, 1829
- The Undying One and Other Poems, 1830
- The Faithless Knight, 1830
- The Dream, and Other Poems, 1840
- The Child of the Islands, 1845
- Aunt Carry's Ballads for Children, 1847
- Bingen on the Rhine, 1847, subsequent printing "Copyrighted 1883 by Porter & Coates, Philadelphia"
- The Centenary Festival, 1859
- The Lady of La Garaye, 1862
- We Have Been Friends Together

=== Novels ===
- The Dandies Rout, 1825
- The Wife, and Woman's Reward, 3 vols, 1835
- Stuart of Dunleath, 3 vols, 1851
- Lost and Saved, 3 vols, 1863
- Old Sir Douglas 3 vols, 1866

=== Plays ===
- The Gypsy Father, 1830
- Vathek, based on the novel by William Beckford, 1830. In the Notes & Queries issue of March 2017, 86–95 ("The Lost Manuscript of Caroline Norton's Vathek"), Robert J. Gemmett provides compelling evidence that Caroline's manuscript of this play may have survived.

=== Songs ===
- "Juanita", 1855: Notably the first ballad by a woman composer to achieve massive sales.

== See also ==
- "We Thank Thee, O God, for a Prophet"
