= Uncorking Old Sherry =

Print by James Gillray

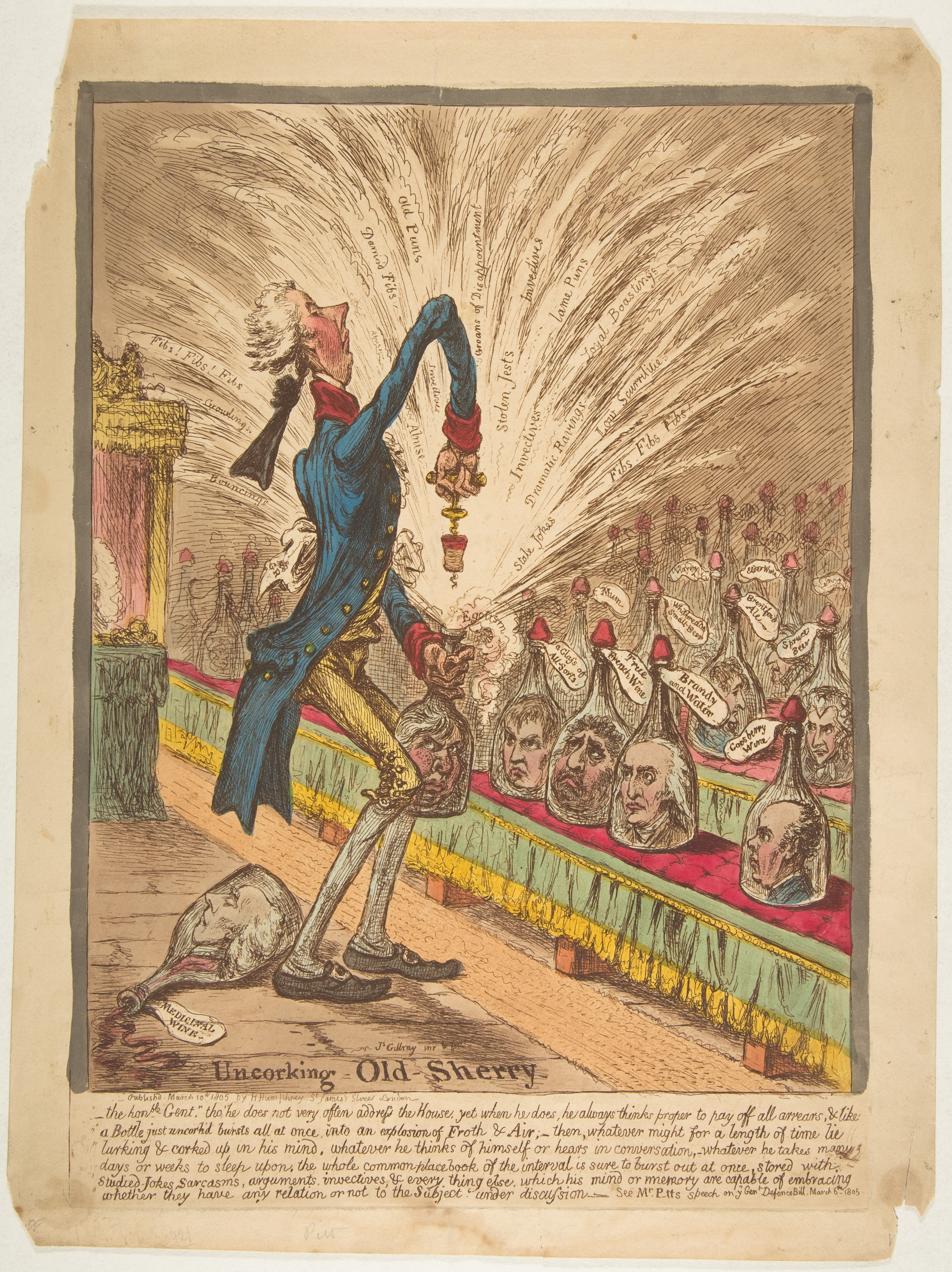
- Artist: James Gillray
- Year: 10 March 1805
- Type: Hand-coloured etching
- Dimensions: 35.7 cm × 25.4 cm (14.1 in × 10.0 in)
- Location: Metropolitan Museum of Art; New York

Uncorking Old Sherry is an 1805 satirical cartoon by the English caricaturist James Gillray. The title is a play on the drink sherry and the nickname of the playwright, theatre manager and politician Richard Brinsley Sheridan. The Irish-born Sheridan had long associated with the Whig opposition, the print responded to a rambling speech he had recently made in the House of Commons against the Prime Minister William Pitt the Younger. Following Pitt's death the following year Sheridan was made Treasurer of the Navy in the short-lived Ministry of All the Talents.

Pitt is shown uncorking a bottle containing the head of Sheridan, releasing a series of old puns and attacks on the government. Shown on the opposition bench are other leaders of the Whig opposition including Charles James Fox. The work was reportedly originally dashed off by Gillray on a scrap of paper in a few hours. Pitt describes the opposition as like a newly opened bottle which "bursts all at once, into an explosion of froth and air". Amused by it, Sheridan himself ordered six copies, despite being the butt of the image's humour. It was published by the print seller Hannah Humphrey who handled much of Gillray's output. Today it is in the collection of the Metropolitan Museum of Art in New York.

== See also ==
- The Plumb-pudding in danger, another 1805 work by Gillray depicting Pitt the Younger

== Bibliography ==
- Loxton, Alice, UPROAR!: Satire, Scandal and Printmakers in Georgian London, Icon Books, 2023.
- Morwood, James & Crane, David. Sheridan Studies. Cambridge University Press,1995
- Piccitto, Diane & Robinson Terry F. The Visual Life of Romantic Theater, 1780–1830. University of Michigan Press, 2023.
- Reid, Christopher. Imprison'd Wranglers: The Rhetorical Culture of the House of Commons 1760–1800. Oxford University Press, 2012.
- Taylor, David Francis. The Politics of Parody: A Literary History of Caricature, 1760–1830. Yale University Press, 2018.
