= The Plumb-pudding in danger =

1805 editorial cartoon

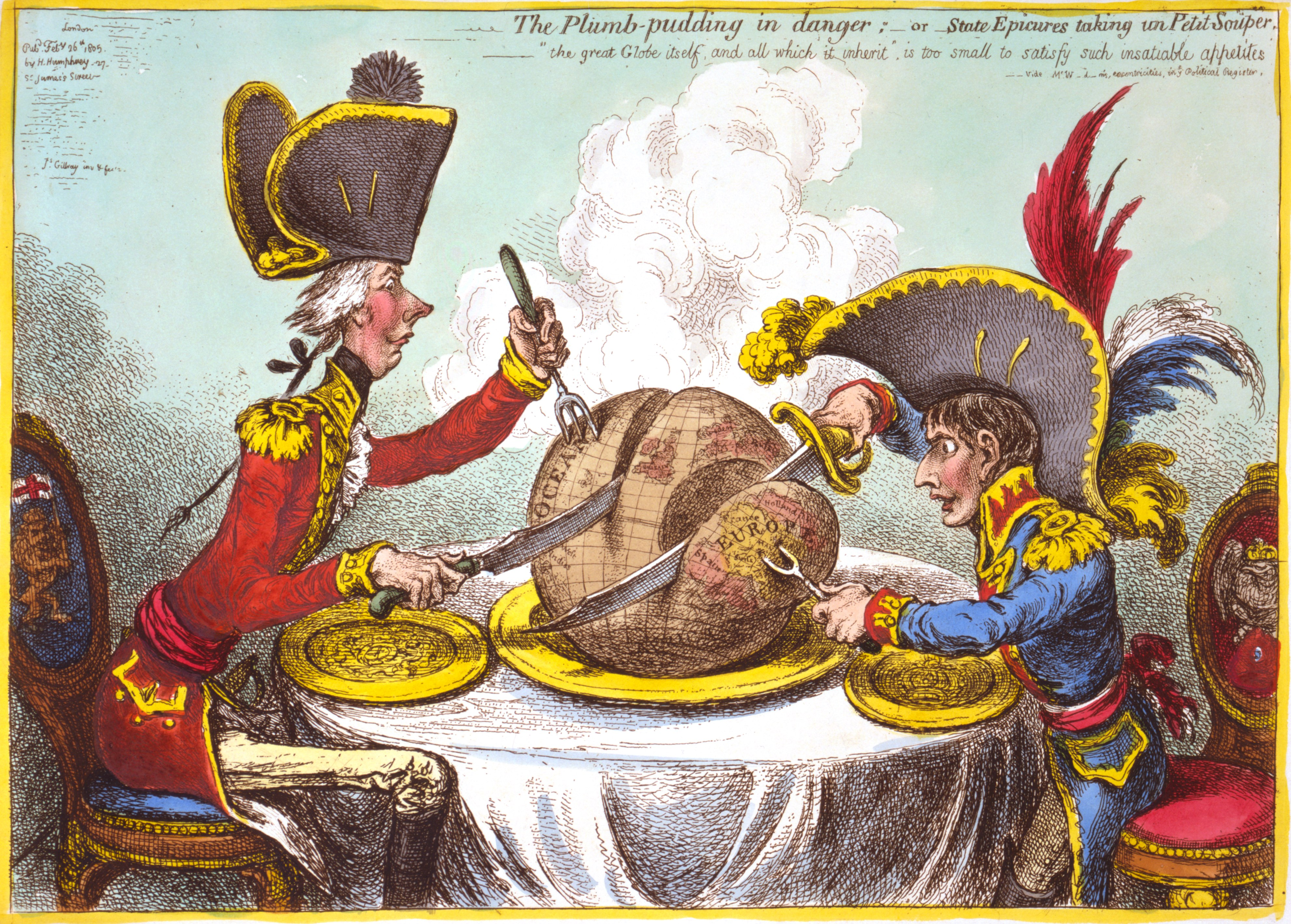
The Plumb-pudding in danger; - or - State Epicures taking un Petit Souper

The Plumb-pudding in danger, or, State Epicures taking un Petit Souper is an 1805 editorial cartoon by the English artist James Gillray. The popular print depicts caricatures of the British Prime Minister William Pitt the Younger and the newly crowned Emperor of France Napoleon, both wearing military uniforms, carving up a terrestrial globe into spheres of influence. It was published as a hand-coloured print and has been described by the National Portrait Gallery as "probably Gillray's most famous print" and by the British Library as "one of Gillray's most famous satires dealing with the Napoleonic wars".

== Background ==
Gillray's print is a satire on the overtures made by Napoleon in January 1805 for a reconciliation with Britain during the War of the Third Coalition. The short-lived Peace of Amiens, a treaty between Britain and France, had ended in 1803, and Napoleon was threatening to invade Britain with his Grande Armée based at Boulogne.

The peace overtures came to nothing: before the end of the year, a combined Franco-Spanish fleet would be decisively defeated by the Royal Navy at the Battle of Trafalgar, giving Britain unrivalled control of the seas, but Napoleon would establish a dominant position in Europe by first defeating an Austrian army through manoeuvre in the Ulm Campaign, and then winning a great victory over a combined Russian-Austrian army at the Battle of Austerlitz, ending the Third Coalition with the 1805 Peace of Pressburg.

== Description ==
Pitt and Napoleon are seated on opposite sides of a dining table, each using a carving knife and carving fork to cut pieces from a large spherical plum pudding bearing a map of the world, with the British Isles at the centre between them. The scene is replete with iconography referring to the contemporary political situation the Napoleonic Wars.

Pitt, sitting to the left, is depicted tall and emaciated. He wears a red uniform of those worn by British military units – perhaps the Cinque Port Volunteer Corps that he had raised in Kent – with powdered hair in a queue, and a cocked tricorn hat. His fork resembles a three-pronged trident, referring to Britain's naval might, and he is carving a slice of sea to the west of the British Isles marked "ocean" and "West Indies".

Napoleon, to the right, the "little corporal", is much smaller in height and stockier in build, with a prominent hooked nose. He wears the blue uniform of the French Imperial Army, and his large fore-and-aft bicorne has an extravagant feather plume reminiscent of a Gallic rooster and in the colours of the flag of France. His large knife resembles a military sword, and his two-pronged fork is embedded over a region marked "Hanover", home of the ruling British monarchs of the House of Hanover. He is cutting away a slice of land to the east of the British Isles marked "Europe", but his piece of land is much smaller than Pitt's portion of sea.

The pudding rests on a large gold platter at the centre of the table, which is covered by a white tablecloth. Pitt and Napoleon each have a smaller gold plate ready for their slices, Pitt's bearing the British Royal Coat of Arms and Napoleon's an imperial crown. The back of Pitt's chair is decorated with the image of lion carrying a cross of St George (sometimes a Union Flag) and Napoleon's has an Imperial eagle clutching a bonnet rouge.

The printing plate measures 10.25 by 14.25 inches (260 mm × 362 mm) and was typically impressed on paper measuring around 10.5 by 15 inches (270 mm × 380 mm). The print includes at top right the title "The Plumb-pudding in danger; - or - State Epicures taking un Petit Souper" the latter half in French, meaning 'state gourmets taking a little supper' – "Epicures" refers to the Greek hedonist philosopher Epicurus. Below this is a quotation attributed to William Windham in the Political Register newspaper, but actually taken from Shakespeare's The Tempest, Act 4, Scene 1, lines 153-4:

"The great Globe itself and all which it inherit", is too small to satisfy such insatiable appetites.
- - Vide Mr W-d-m's eccentricities, in ye Political Register.

An inscription also records that the print was designed and made by James Gillray, but it was not numbered or signed.

== Reception ==
The print was published by Hannah Humphrey, of 27 St James's Street in London, on 26 February 1805, and was originally sold for about five shillings. There are examples in many museum and private collections. It has been described by Martin Rowson as "probably the most famous political cartoon of all time ... stolen over and over and over again by cartoonists ever since".

== See also ==
- Uncorking Old Sherry, another 1805 work by Gillray
