= Grantley =

Grantley may refer to -

Places

- Grantley, North Yorkshire, England
  - Grantley Hall, a country estate in North Yorkshire, England
- Grantley, Pennsylvania, United States
- Grantley Harbor, a waterway in Port Clarence, Alaska, United States

People

- Baron Grantley, a title in the Peerage of Great Britain
  - Fletcher Norton, 1st Baron Grantley (1716-1789)
  - William Norton, 2nd Baron Grantley (1742-1822)
  - John Norton, 5th Baron Grantley (1865-1943)
  - Richard Norton, 8th Baron Grantley (b. 1956)
- Gyton Grantley (b. 1980), Australian actor
- Steve Grantley (fl. 1980s), British rock drummer

Other

- Grantley Adams International Airport, Barbados
