= Fletcher Norton (disambiguation) =

Fletcher Norton may refer to:

- Fletcher Norton, 1st Baron Grantley (1716–1789), English lawyer and MP from 1756 to 1782
- Fletcher Norton (judge) (1744–1820), Anglo-Scottish barrister and MP, son of 1st Baron Grantley and father of 3rd Baron Grantley
- Fletcher Norton, 3rd Baron Grantley (1796–1875), English peer, grandson of 1st Baron, nephew of 2nd Baron
- Fletcher Norton (1877–1941), American actor in 1920s and 1930s films (The Big House)
