= Listed buildings in Sawley, North Yorkshire =

Sawley is a civil parish in the county of North Yorkshire, England. It contains 23 listed buildings that are recorded in the National Heritage List for England. Of these, one is listed at Grade II*, the middle of the three grades, and the others are at Grade II, the lowest grade. The parish contains the village of Sawley, smaller settlements, and the surrounding countryside. Most of the listed buildings are houses, farmhouses and associated structures, and the others include part of a medieval cross, bridges, a former watermill, a gravestone, and two mileposts.

== Key ==
Grade	Criteria
II*	Particularly important buildings of more than special interest
II	Buildings of national importance and special interest

== Buildings ==
Name and location	Photograph	Date	Notes	Grade
Lacon Cross; 54.09524°N 1.62746°W		Medieval	The remains of the cross are in gritstone, and consist of a plinth about 1.5 metres (4 ft 11 in) square and 20 centimetres (7.9 in) in height. Set into the centre is a socket stone about 60 centimetres (24 in) square and 40 centimetres (16 in) in height, and the cross shaft is square, about 1 metre (3 ft 3 in) in height, with roll mouldings on the corners.	II
Hog Hall; 54.10788°N 1.61018°W	—	16th century (or earlier)	The house is in gritstone with quoins and a stone slate roof. It consists of a hall and a cross-wing. One bay of the single-storey hall range remains; the cross-wing has two storeys and attic, and fronts of one and four bays. The hall range contains a doorway with a chamfered quoined surround and a triangular head, and to its right is a window. The cross-wing has three tiers of mullioned windows in the gable end, and on the right return are mullioned windows of up to five lights.	II*
Lacon Hall; 54.09702°N 1.62316°W	—	Early 17th century	The house, which incorporates the remains of a 16th-century timber framed house, is in gritstone on a plinth, with quoins, a moulded string course, and a purple slate roof with gable copings. There are two storeys and attics, and four bays. On the front is a doorway with a quoined surround, and a triangular head with a deep lintel, and the windows are mullioned.	II
Barn, Birka Carr; 54.11229°N 1.64047°W	—	Mid-17th century	The barn is in gritstone, with quoins, and a stone slate roof with shaped kneelers and chamfered gable copings. There is a single storey, five bays, and a four-bay aisle. The aisle contains two doorways with chamfered quoined surrounds, and there is a similar doorway on the barn. At the rear is a segmental-arched wagon entrance, projecting through stones, and slit vents.	II
Hungate Cottage; 54.11601°N 1.64625°W	—	Mid-17th century	The house is in gritstone, and has a stone slate roof with gable copings. There are two storeys and two bays, a lower bay to the left, and a single-storey two-bay addition to the right. In the centre of the main range is a doorway, and the windows are mullioned.	II
West Gowbusk Farmhouse; 54.10895°N 1.63764°W	—	Mid to late 17th century	The house, which was extended in the early 19th century, is in gritstone with a stone slate roof. There are two storeys and two bays, and an added bay to the right. The right bay contains a doorway with a plain surround, and sash windows. The older part has two casement windows, and mullioned windows with some mullions removed.	II
Brook House and barn 54.09563°N 1.61874°W		Early 18th century	The house and attached barn are in gritstone and have a stone slate roof with shaped kneelers and gable coping. There are two storeys, the house has three bays, the right bay taller, and the barn has one bay. The house has quoins, a porch and mullioned windows. The barn contains a garage door and a mullioned window.	II
Hall Gates Farmhouse; 54.09853°N 1.61213°W		Early 18th century	The farmhouse is in whitewashed gritstone, with quoins, and a pantile roof, the lower courses in stone slate, with flat-faced kneelers and gable copings. There are two storeys and two bays, and flanking single-storey bays. The central doorway has a quoined surround, and the windows have three lights and architraves. In each outer bay is a doorway.	II
Gowbusk; 54.10904°N 1.63673°W	—	Early to mid-18th century	The house is in gritstone, with quoins, and a stone slate roof. There are two storeys and two bays. In the centre is a porch and a doorway with a chamfered surround. The windows are a mix of casements and horizontally sliding sashes, some with chamfered surrounds.	II
Lowgate Farmhouse; 54.10826°N 1.60416°W	—	Early to mid-18th century	The house is in stone, with quoins, and a pantile roof with four eaves courses of stone slates. There are two storeys and three bays. The doorway in the right bay has a crudely cut lintel, and the windows are four-pane casements with stone surrounds.	II
Woodlands; 54.11406°N 1.62957°W	—	Early to mid-18th century	A house and a barn in gritstone, both with quoins, the house with a stone slate roof and gable copings, and the barn with a corrugated iron roof. The house has two storeys and two bays. There is a central doorway in an eared architrave, with a moulded cornice and a triangular pediment, and the windows are mullioned with two lights. The barn has four bays, and contains a cart entrance with a segmental arch, doors and windows.	II
Church Farmhouse; 54.10554°N 1.62058°W	—	Mid-18th century	The house is in gritstone, with quoins, and a pantile roof with four courses of stone slate at the eaves, shaped kneelers and gable coping. There are two storeys and two bays, and a lower two-storey bay to the left. On the front is a gabled porch, and casement windows with lintels and triple keystones.	II
Hind House Farmhouse; 54.11065°N 1.61551°W	—	Mid-18th century	The house is in gritstone, with quoins, and a stone slate roof with gable copings and kneelers. There are two storeys and two bays, and an extension to the left with one storey and an attic. The main doorway has an eared architrave, a pulvinated frieze, and a shallow moulded cornice. On the extension is a doorway with a moulded surround, a square window, and a horizontally-sliding sash window. At the rear is a narrow stair window.	II
Two bridges and walls near Grantley Hall; 54.11884°N 1.63607°W		Late 18th century (probable)	The bridges are in stone. The north bridge crosses the River Skell, and consists of a single segmental arch, with a band at road level, and a parapet rising in the centre with chamfered coping. The west bridge crosses Hungate Dike, and consists of a single round arch with a band and a coped parapet. The walls are in large blocks of squared gritstone, and flank the river for about 20 metres (66 ft).	II
Grantley Mill; 54.11815°N 1.63223°W	—	Late 18th century	The former watermill is in gritstone, and has a roof of stone slate and corrugated asbestos with gable copings. The west side has two storeys and four bays, and contains a doorway with a wide arch and voussoirs. The east side has three storeys, a central doorway to the wheelhouse with a quoined surround, and windows. On the right return is a small loading door.	II
Hill Top Farmhouse and walls 54.10873°N 1.62616°W	—	Late 18th century	The house is in gritstone, with quoins, and a pantile roof with shaped kneelers and gable copings. There are two storeys and three bays. The doorway has a lintel with a keystone, the windows are sashes with plain surrounds, and at the rear is a round-arched stair window. The flanking walls each has a blind recess and a doorway with a keystone. The wall enclosing the garden to the west has rounded coping and is ramped at the south end.	II
Rough House and walls 54.10690°N 1.59403°W		Late 18th century	Also known as Ruffe House, it is a folly converted into a house. It is in stone with a pantile roof and rough crowsteppd gables. There is one storey and attics, and three bays. On the front are three Gothic arches, the middle one containing a doorway and the outer ones with windows. Over the door is a keystone carved with a bearded face, and in the attics are gabled dormers. At the rear is a central doorway and circular windows. On the sides are projecting stones to give a ruined appearance from a distance. The building is flanked by recessed walls with arches.	II
Sawley Hall; 54.09634°N 1.60947°W	—	Late 18th century	The house and stables are in rendered stone on a gritstone plinth, with rusticated quoins, and hipped Westmorland slate roofs. The house has two storeys and attics, and fronts of seven and five bays, a rear wing of two storeys and four bays, and to the left is a courtyard enclosed by ranges with two storeys and about eight bays. The house has a central doorway with attached Doric columns and a corniced pediment. The middle bay is flanked by giant Ionic pilasters with paterae, an entablature and a moulded cornice. The windows are sashes in architraves. On the rear wing is a large Venetian stair window. At the entrance to the courtyard is a segmental carriage arch with a quoined surround.	II
Gravestone of Thomas Lonsdale; 54.10496°N 1.61995°W	—	1781	The gravestone is in the churchyard of St Michael's Church, to the south of the church. It is in gritstone, and consists of a block about 1 metre (3 ft 3 in) in height and 80 centimetres (31 in) in width, with a scrolled top. On the stone is a well-cut inscription.	II
Milepost near Sawley Moor Lane; 54.10381°N 1.64564°W		Early 19th century	The milepost, on the south side of the B6265 road, is in cast iron. It has a triangular plan and a triangular sloping top, and is about 80 centimetres (31 in) in height. On the top is inscribed the distance to Skipton, the sides have pointing hands, on the left side is the distance to Pateley Bridge, and on the right side to Ripon.	II
Milepost near the Black-a-Moor public house 54.11339°N 1.62986°W		Early 19th century	The milepost, on the east side of the B6265 road, is in cast iron. It has a triangular plan and a triangular sloping top, and is about 80 centimetres (31 in) in height. On the top is inscribed the distance to Skipton, the sides have pointing hands, on the left side is the distance to Pateley Bridge, and on the right side to Ripon.	II
Garden building and wall west of Sawley Hall; 54.09661°N 1.61217°W	—	Early to mid-19th century (probable)	The garden building is in gritstone, with oversailing eaves, and a conical grey slate roof. It has a circular plan, its entrance flanked by narrow buttresses and jambs, and with a curved lintel. This is enclosed by a circular wall containing a wide gateway on the north and a narrower pedestrian gate on the south, both with chamfered shallow triangular-arched lintels.	II
Horse engine house, Sawley Hall; 54.09674°N 1.60963°W	—	Mid-19th century	The horse engine house, to the north of the stables, is in gritstone, with a blue slate roof and gable coping. There are fronts of one and two bays. The west front has a left open bay and a cart entry to the right. At the rear is a cart entry, the right return contains a central doorway, and inside is a curved wall.	II
