= Richard Norton (rebel) =

English rebel (c. 1488 – 9 April 1588)

Richard Norton (c. 1488 – 9 April 1588), known as Old Norton, was an English rebel who participated in the Rising of the North in 1569, alongside several of his numerous sons.

== Life ==
Norton is said to have been born in 1488. He was eldest son of John Norton of Norton Conyers, by his wife Anne, daughter of William or Miles Radclyffe of Rylstone. His grandfather, Sir John Norton of Norton Conyers, was grandson of Sir Richard Norton, chief justice of the common pleas.

Norton took part in the Pilgrimage of Grace in 1536–1537, but was pardoned. In 1545 and in 1556 he was one of the council of the north. In 1555 and 1557 he was governor of Norham Castle, but apparently lost these offices on the accession of Elizabeth I.

Norton was however sheriff of Yorkshire in 1568–1569. During the York Conference discussing Mary, Queen of Scots, and the Casket Letters, Norton, his son Francis, and Thomas Markenfield plotted to assassinate Regent Moray.

On the breaking out of the Rising of the North in 1569 he joined the insurgents, and is described as "an old gentleman with a reverend grey beard". When the rebels took Hartlepool, they heard that Fadrique Álvarez de Toledo, 4th Duke of Alba would send supplies to the port. They suspected the message was bogus, perhaps sent by Norton to boost morale. Norton's estates were confiscated, and he was attainted. When all was over, Richard and Francis Norton were not included the pardons granted by Elizabeth I in November 1569.

Norton fled across the border into Scotland. In January 1570 at Cavers Castle he spoke to Robert Constable, an agent belonging to the English royal army, but resisted his suggestions of coming to England and asking for mercy. Francis and Sampson Norton were also staying at Cavers. Constable managed to get Norton to reveal where other fugitives from the rebellion were staying in Scotland. Norton soon went to Flanders, where he and other members of his family were pensioned by Philip II of Spain, his own allowance being eighteen crowns a month. John Story was said to have conversed with him in Flanders in 1571. He afterwards seems to have lived in France, and Edmund Neville was accused of being in his house at Rouen.

He died abroad, probably in Flanders, on 9 April 1588. In Lewes Lewknor's Estate of the English Fugitives (1595), "old Norton" is mentioned as one of those who are "onely for want of things necessarie, and of pure povertie, consumed and dead".

== Marriages and children ==
Norton married firstly Susanna, fifth daughter of Richard Neville, 2nd Baron Latimer, and secondly Philippa, daughter of Robert Trappes of London, widow of Sir George Gifford.

He left a very large family, including eleven sons, several of whom were also involved in the rebellion of 1569:

- The eldest son, Francis Norton of Balderslie, Lincolnshire, took part in the rebellion of 1569, and fled with his father to Flanders in 1570. He carried on a correspondence with the Earl of Leicester in 1572, but died in exile. His wife, Albreda or Aubrey Wimbush, had in June 1573 an allowance of one hundred marks a year from her husband's lands.
- The second son, John Norton, of Ripon and Lazenby, Lincolnshire, was accused of complicity in the rebellion in 1572, but lived on in England. He married: first, Jane, daughter of Robert Morton of Bawtry; secondly, Margaret, daughter of Christopher Readshaw. He has been identified with John Norton who was executed on 9 August 1600 for recusancy, together with one John Talbot. His wife (presumably his second wife) at that time was reprieved, as being with child. Another John Norton received a pardon in December 1601 for harbouring Thomas Palliser, a seminary priest.
- The third son, Edmund Norton of Clowbeck, Yorkshire, is supposed to have died in 1610. He was ancestor of Fletcher Norton, 1st Baron Grantley.
- William Norton, the fourth son, of Hartforth, Yorkshire, took part in the rebellion, was arraigned at Westminster on 6 April 1570, was confined in the Tower, and presumably released on a composition. He appears to have been befriended by the Earl of Warwick and Sir George Bowes. He married Anne, daughter of Mathew Boynton.
- The fifth son, George Norton, although sentenced to death, was apparently not executed.
- The sixth son, Thomas Norton, was not implicated, and must be distinguished from his uncle Thomas, who was executed at Tyburn in 1570.
- Christopher Norton, the seventh son, was a devoted adherent of Mary, Queen of Scots, and, with other Yorkshire gentlemen, formed a plot to murder the regent of Scotland James Stewart, 1st Earl of Moray early in 1569. Having secured a position in the guard of Lord Scrope at Bolton, he planned her escape, and, though that scheme came to nothing, he had communications with her which probably guided the rebels later in the year. He was seen by a spy (Captain Shirley) at Raby in December, and is described by Sir Ralph Sadler as "one of the principal workers" in the rebellion. When the rising failed he was taken at Carlisle in December 1569, and brought up to London. He confessed, and was executed at Tyburn early in 1570.
- Marmaduke Norton, the eighth son, pleaded guilty, and was probably released on composition about 1572. He died at Stranton, County Durham, in 1594, having married, first, Elizabeth, daughter of John Killinghall; and, secondly, Frances, daughter of Ralph Hedworth of Pokerly, widow of George Blakeston.
- The ninth son, Sampson Norton, after taking part in the rebellion, died abroad before the end of 1594. He had married Bridget, daughter of Sir Ralph Bulmer.

There were two other sons, Richard and Henry, who both died in 1564.

== Legacy ==
The story of the Nortons is utilised by William Wordsworth in his long narrative poem The White Doe of Rylstone.

As of 1895, a portrait of Norton was in the possession of John Norton, 5th Baron Grantley, the representative of the family at the time.
