= Hog Hall =

House in Sawley, North Yorkshire, England

Coordinates: 54.1077°N 1.6103°W

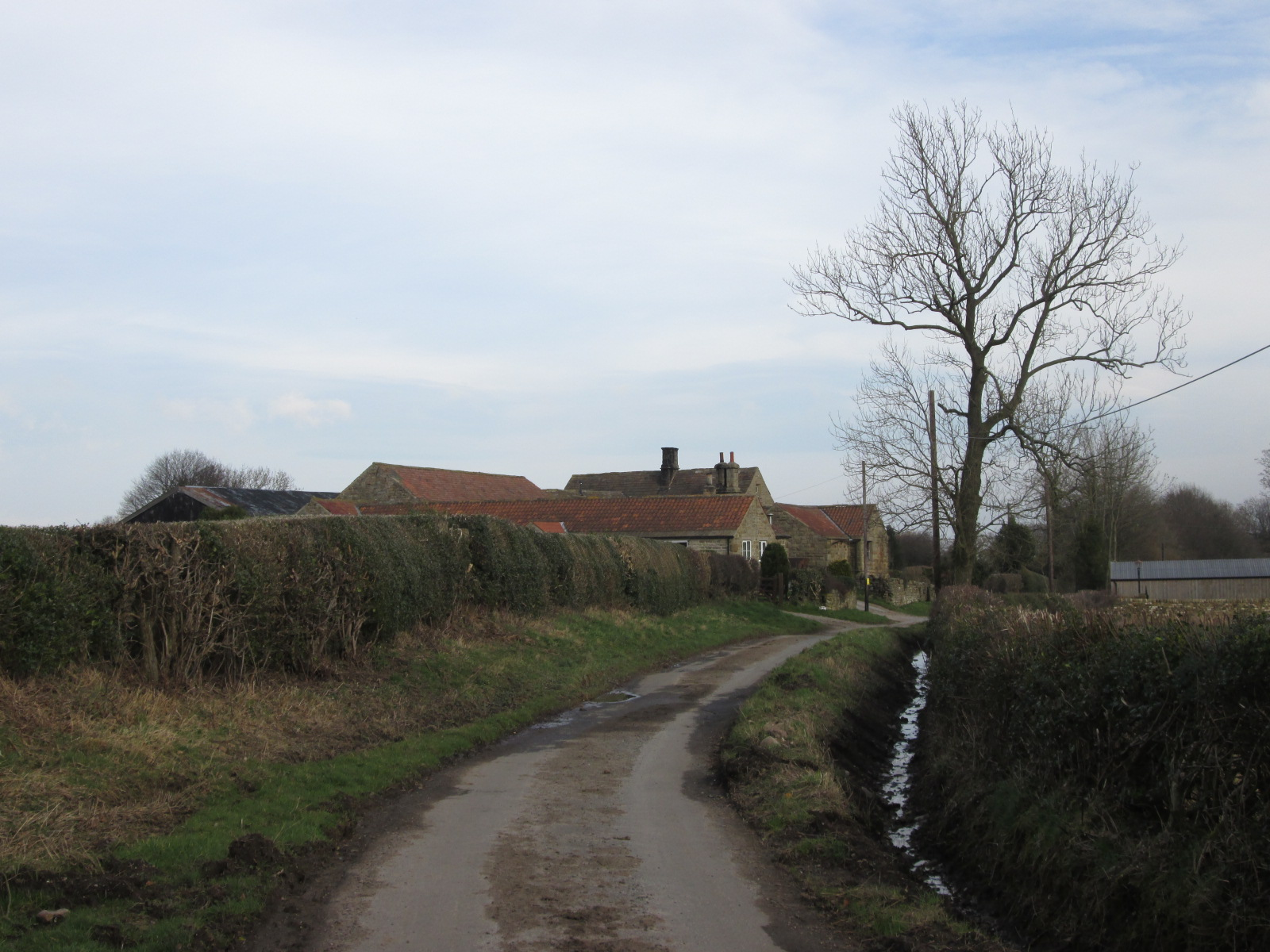
Road to the house, visible in the background

Hog Hall is a historic building in Sawley, North Yorkshire, a village in England.

The manor house was built in or before the 16th century, probably for the Norton family. At various times, it was owned by the Grantley Hall or Studley Royal estates. It was extended in the 19th century, when various outbuildings were also erected. From 1934 to 1968, it was the residence of artist Dorothy Caine. The house was grade II* listed in 1967.

The house is built of gritstone with quoins and a stone slate roof. It consists of a hall and a cross-wing. One bay of the single-storey hall range remains; the cross-wing has two storeys and attic, and fronts of one and four bays. The hall range contains a doorway with a chamfered quoined surround and a triangular head, and to its right is a window. The cross-wing has three tiers of mullioned windows in the gable end, and on the right return are mullioned windows of up to five lights.

== See also ==
- Grade II* listed buildings in North Yorkshire (district)
- Listed buildings in Sawley, North Yorkshire
