= Eavestone =

Hamlet and civil parish in North Yorkshire, England

Coordinates: 54.10976°N 1.65907°W

- Location within North Yorkshire
- Population: 20
- OS grid reference: SE223682
- Civil parish: Eavestone
- Unitary authority: North Yorkshire
- Ceremonial county: North Yorkshire
- Region: Yorkshire and the Humber
- Country: England
- Sovereign state: United Kingdom
- Post town: RIPON
- Postcode district: HG4
- Police: North Yorkshire
- Fire: North Yorkshire
- Ambulance: Yorkshire

Eavestone is a hamlet and civil parish in the county of North Yorkshire, England. It is situated near Brimham Rocks, 3 miles (4.8 km) east of Pateley Bridge. The population of the parish was estimated at 20 in 2012.

Eavestone was historically in the West Riding of Yorkshire. It is mentioned in the Domesday Book, held by the Archbishop of York in 1086. It remained an extra parochial area until 1743, when it was joined to the parish of Ripon. It became a separate civil parish in 1866, and was transferred to North Yorkshire in 1974. The parish now shares a grouped parish council with the civil parishes of Grantley, Sawley and Skelding, known as the Grantley, Sawley, Skelding and Eavestone Parish Council. From 1974 to 2023 it was part of the Borough of Harrogate, it is now administered by the unitary North Yorkshire Council.

In the late 18th century, Lord Grantley laid out an ornamental lake and footpaths, now known as Eavestone Lake and Fishpond Wood, to the South of the hamlet.

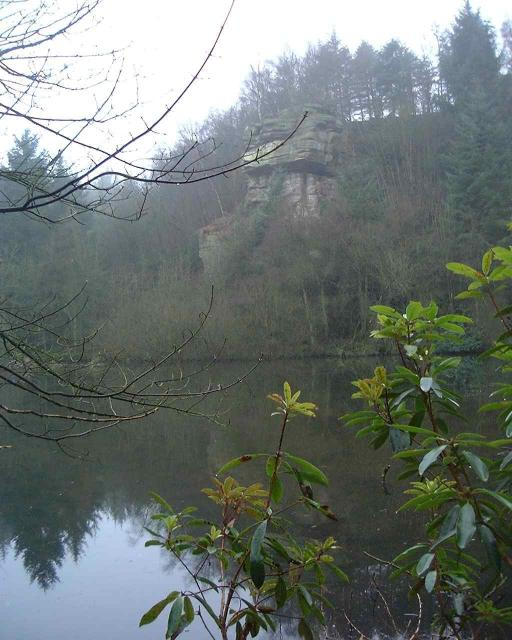
Eavestone Lake
