= St Michael's Church, Sawley =

Church in Sawley, North Yorkshire, England

Coordinates: 54.1050°N 1.6199°W

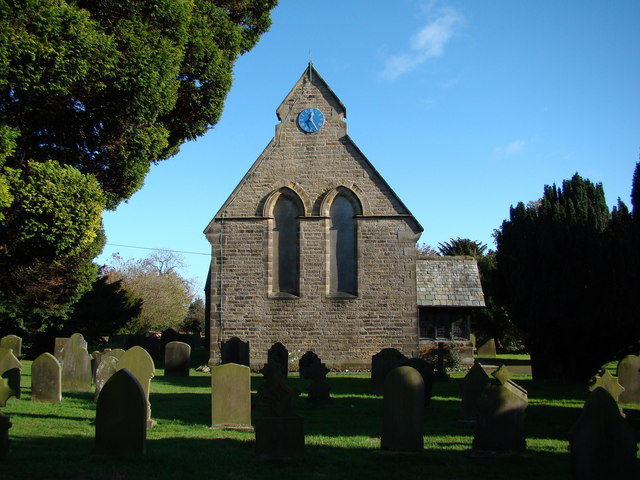
The church, in 2008

St Michael's Church is the parish church of Sawley, North Yorkshire, a village in England.

A church was built in Sawley by the owners of Sawley Hall, described in 1871 as a "plain stone oblong building, with a belfry and one bell". In 1879 it was replaced by the current building, on the same site but larger than its predecessor. It was designed by Edward Birchall and cost about £2,000. It is in the Decorated Gothic style, and is built of local stone, with a slate roof. The font was retained from the old building.
