= Listed buildings in Grantley, North Yorkshire =

Grantley is a civil parish in the county of North Yorkshire, England. It contains five listed buildings that are recorded in the National Heritage List for England. Of these, one is listed at Grade II*, the middle of the three grades, and the others are at Grade II, the lowest grade. The parish contains the village of Grantley and the smaller settlement of Low Grantley. The listed buildings consist of a country house, a smaller house, and three farmhouses.

== Key ==
| Grade | Criteria |
|---|---|
| II* | Particularly important buildings of more than special interest |
| II | Buildings of national importance and special interest |

== Buildings ==
| Name and location | Photograph | Date | Notes | Grade |
|---|---|---|---|---|
| Low Grantley Farmhouse; 54.12806°N 1.63706°W | | 17th century | The farmhouse is in stone, with quoins, and a stone slate roof with moulded coping and shaped kneelers. There are two storeys and four bays. The doorway has a chamfered quoined surround and the windows are a mix of casements and horizontally-sliding sashes, all with moulded chamfered surrounds. In the right return are blocked mullioned windows. | II |
| Grantley Old Hall Farmhouse; 54.12346°N 1.64612°W | | Late 17th century | The farmhouse is in stone, with quoins, and a stone slate roof with moulded coping and shaped kneelers. There are three storeys, a double-depth plan and four bays. The central doorway has a moulded chamfered surround and a four-centred arch. The windows are all chamfered and mullioned, and above the ground floor openings is a continuous hood mould. Over the doorway is a square tablet. The right return contains a doorway with a chamfered basket-arched lintel. | II |
| Grantley Hall; 54.11876°N 1.63162°W | | Mid to late 18th century | A country house later used for other purposes, in stone with stone slate roofs. The main east front has two storeys and 17 bays, the south front has three storeys, a U-shaped plan, and eleven bays, and there is a north service range. The east front has a plinth, fluted pilasters with friezes, sill bands, a moulded cornice and a parapet. The middle three bays have three storeys and are canted with a hipped roof, and in the centre is a doorway with a cornice on consoles. The windows are sashes in moulded architraves, and in each outer range, two bays are pedimented. The south front has a central doorway with a moulded architrave, and a doorcase with Doric half-columns, a frieze with triglyphs, a cornice and a pediment. | II* |
| Rose Farmhouse; 54.12850°N 1.63594°W | — | 1807 | The farmhouse, which was extended later in the 19th century, is in stone, the original part with a stone slate roof, the addition with a concrete tile roof. The roofs have stone coping and shaped kneelers, and both parts have two storeys. The original part has two bays, and contains a central doorway with a plain surround, and a dated and initialled lintel, above which is an open pedimented hood. The windows are sashes with plain surrounds. The addition has three bays, and the sash windows have quoined surrounds. | II |
| School House; 54.12414°N 1.64659°W | — | 1835 | The house is in stone, with quoins, and a stone slate roof with stone copings and shaped kneelers. There are two storeys and two bays. The central doorway has a plain surround, and above it is a panel with a pointed arch containing the date, over which is a gabled stone hood on consoles. Above the door is a tablet with a bust of a crowned figure. The windows are casements with pointed-arched heads. | II |
