= Thomas Markenfield =

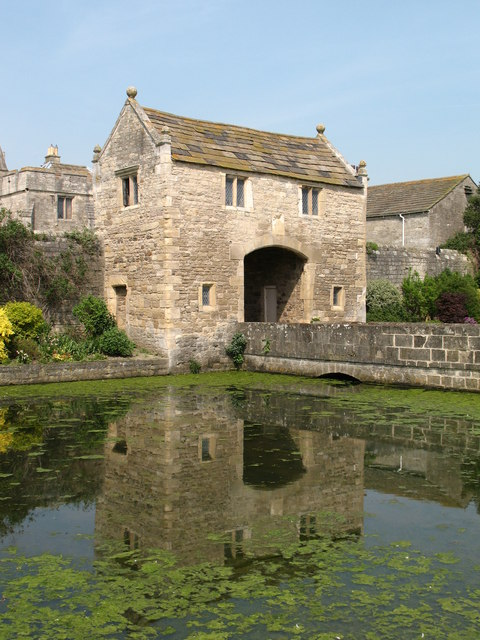
The gatehouse at Markenfield Hall

Thomas Markenfield (1532–1592) was an English 16th-century landowner who took part in the 1569 Rising of the North.

== Northern Rebellion ==
He was the son of Thomas Markenfield of Markenfield Hall (died 1550) and Margaret Norton. Thomas Markenfield was a Catholic who spent some years abroad. He married Isabel Ingleby.

When, in September 1568, a conference was held at York to discuss Mary, Queen of Scots, and the Casket Letters, Markenfield, Richard Norton, and other English supporters of Mary, made plans to assassinate Regent Moray at Northallerton. Mary herself did not approve of the scheme.

In August 1569, Roger Cholmeley of Brandsby travelled to Wingfield Manor to meet Mary, Queen of Scots. He wrote a letter to his friend Thomas Markenfield describing the visit and invited him to his "poor house at Brandsbye". The letter was intercepted and passed to William Cecil.

With Richard Norton and Thomas Percy, 7th Earl of Northumberland, Markenfield discussed the need to overturn the Protestant state in England. Markenfield went abroad in November 1569 to recruit support for the rebellion. He was not included in a pardon issued for some of the rebels on 22 November.

== Exile ==
Markenfield sought refuge in Scotland with the laird of Buccleuch at Branxholme Castle. At the end of January 1570, the Spanish ambassador Guerau de Espés heard that the Earl of Westmorland and Markenfield were free in Scotland with 600 horsemen, but the Earl of Northumberland was confined at Lochleven Castle.

After taking ship from Scotland, Markenfield lived at Antwerp with other fugitives from the rebellion. He received a Spanish pension of 18 crowns monthly.

According to Richard Verstegan, Thomas Markenfield was found dead in his lodging at Brussels in 1592. Verstegan wrote that Markenfield was found on the bare floor of a miserable cottage.

Markenfield features as "Martinfield" in the Ballad of the Earl of Westmorland.
