= Listed buildings in Markenfield Hall =

Markenfield Hall is a civil parish in the county of North Yorkshire, England. It contains two listed buildings that are recorded in the National Heritage List for England. Of these, one is listed at Grade I, the highest of the three grades, and the other is at Grade II, the lowest grade. The major building in the parish is the fortified manor house of the same name, which is listed, together with associated farm buildings.

== Key ==
Grade	Criteria
I	Buildings of exceptional interest, sometimes considered to be internationally important
II	Buildings of national importance and special interest

== Buildings ==
Name and location	Photograph	Date	Notes	Grade
Markenfield Hall; 54.10161°N 1.55117°W		1310–1323	A fortified manor house on a moated site that has been altered and extended though the centuries. The buildings are in limestone with quoins and stone slate roof, and are arranged around a rectangular courtyard. The south range contains a two-storey gatehouse with a four-centred carriage arch, a bridge over the moat and flanking walls. In the west range is a low two-storey range of outbuildings, and the east range contains accommodation and offices. The main north range has a three-storey block at the northeast corner and a two-story service range. The main block has an embattled parapet, a chapel and a staircase tower.	I
Farm buildings south of Markenfield Hall; 54.10082°N 1.55105°W		16th century	The farm buildings are in limestone with a stone slate roof. They consist of two blocks around a courtyard, and they flank the route to the gatehouse. The main front of each block faces north, and is in one and two storeys, and has seven bays. They contain round arches, mullioned windows, and gables containing plaques and carvings. The courtyards are enclosed by stone walls with weatherboarding.	II
