= Skelding, North Yorkshire =

Civil parish in North Yorkshire, England

Coordinates: 54.1251°N 1.6781°W

Skelding
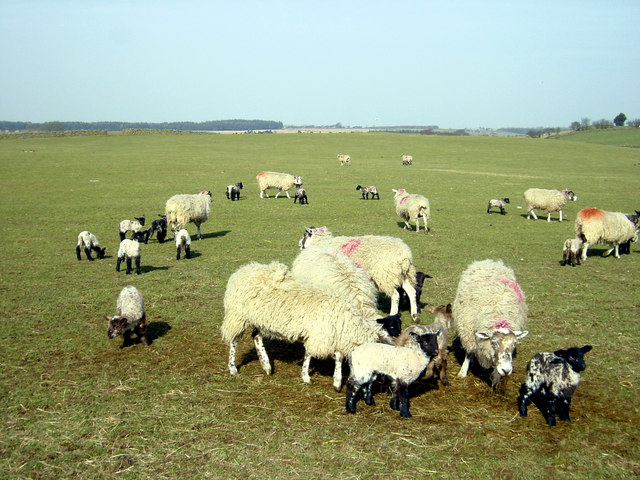

- Location within North Yorkshire
- Population: 40 (2016 estimate)
- Civil parish: Skelding
- Unitary authority: North Yorkshire
- Ceremonial county: North Yorkshire
- Region: Yorkshire and the Humber
- Country: England
- Sovereign state: United Kingdom

Skelding is a civil parish in North Yorkshire, England. It lies 6 miles (10 km) west of Ripon, on the north bank of the River Skell. There is no village in the parish. The population of the parish was estimated at 40 in 2016.

The parish now shares a grouped parish council with the civil parishes of Grantley, Sawley and Eavestone, known as the Grantley, Sawley, Skelding and Eavestone Parish Council. Until 1974 it was part of the West Riding of Yorkshire. From 1974 to 2023 it was part of the Borough of Harrogate, it is now administered by the unitary North Yorkshire Council.

== History ==
The name "Skelding" means 'Head of the River Skell valley'. Skelding was formerly a township in the parish of Ripon, in 1866 Skelding became a separate civil parish.
