= Sawley Hall =

House in Sawley, North Yorkshire, England

Coordinates: 54°05′47″N 1°36′34″W

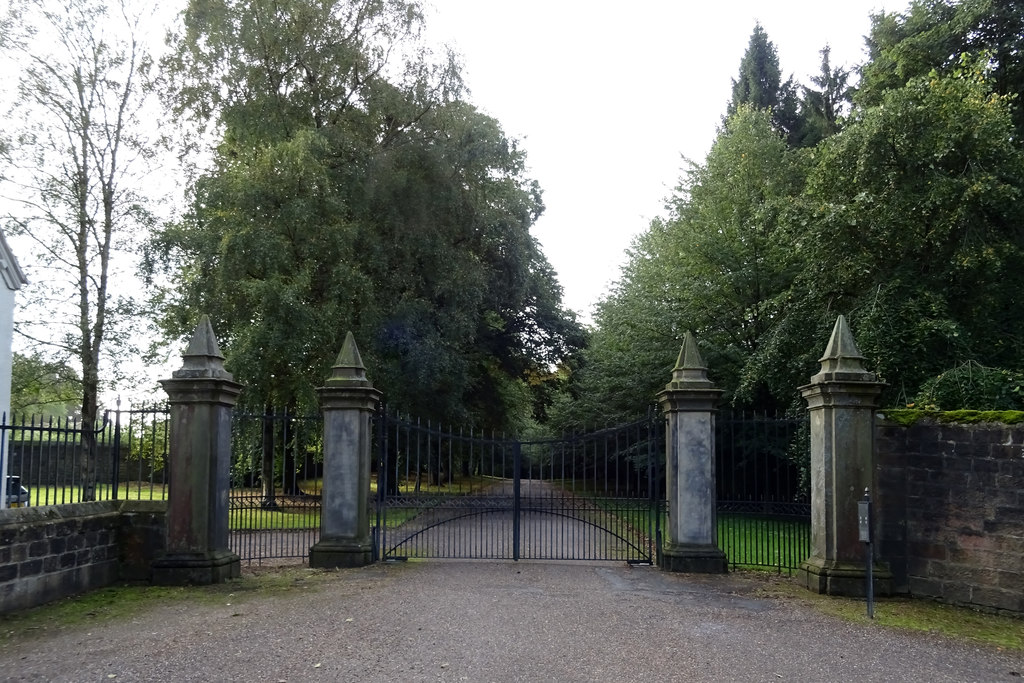
Gateway to Sawley Hall

Sawley Hall is a historic building in Sawley, North Yorkshire, a village in England.

The house was built in 1770, for the wife of Fletcher Norton, 1st Baron Grantley It was altered in the mid to late 19th century, the work including the addition of a service wing. The attached stables were remodelled in the 20th century. Between 1940 and March 1947, the hall was a Barnardo's-run children's home, taking in child evacuees from the Barnardo's 'Hull Every Open Door' home at Beverley. The hall has been grade II listed since 1967.

The Sawley Hall shooting estate consists of 2,500 acres (10 km^{2}) of woodland area, primarily used for shooting pheasant and partridge. From 2009 to 2015, the estate was run by the former rugby league and union player, Liam Botham, the son of English Test cricketer Ian Botham. Near the border of Sawley Hall, there is a great sequoia, one of 3,052 registered worldwide. It is thought that the tree was planted around 1864.

The house and stables are built of rendered stone on a gritstone plinth, with rusticated quoins, and hipped Westmorland slate roofs. The house has two storeys and attics, and fronts of seven and five bays, a rear wing of two storeys and four bays, and to the left is a courtyard enclosed by ranges with two storeys and about eight bays. The house has a central doorway with attached Doric columns and a corniced pediment. The middle bay is flanked by giant Ionic pilasters with paterae, an entablature and a moulded cornice. The windows are sashes in architraves. On the rear wing is a large Venetian stair window. At the entrance to the courtyard is a segmental carriage arch with a quoined surround.

Inside, the house has a large entrance hall with a fireplace with a carved wooden surround. The library has a marble fireplace and bookcases with classical designs, while the drawing room has a black-and-white marble fireplace and wall panels with classical motifs. The dining room has a two-tier fitted sideboard in a recess and a decorated fireplace. There is an early staircase, and most of the rooms have decorative plasterwork.

== See also ==
- Listed buildings in Sawley, North Yorkshire
