= George Chapple Norton =

British Member of Parliament (1800–1875)

George Chapple Norton (31 August 1800 – 24 February 1875) was a Tory Member of Parliament for Guildford from 1826 to 1830.

He was educated at Winchester College.

He died on 24 February 1875 at Wonersh.

== Family ==
He was born in Wakefield the son of Fletcher Norton MP FRSE (1744–1820) and his wife, Caroline Elizabeth Balmain. His younger brother was Charles Francis Norton.

He was the husband of the poet Caroline Norton (daughter of Thomas Sheridan), who became a prominent liberal Feminist who passed reforms to help women in the marital domain, and with whom he reportedly had an unhappy marriage.

His grandfather was Fletcher Norton and his brother was Charles Francis Norton.

== See also ==
- Baron Grantley

== Bibliography ==
- Caine, Barbara. English Feminism, 1780–1980, Oxford University Press, 1997.
- Strauss, Sylvia. Traitors to the Masculine Cause: The Men's Campaigns for Women's Rights. Greenwood Press, 1982.
