= Richard Norton, 8th Baron Grantley =

British politician

Richard William Brinsley Norton, 8th Baron Grantley (born 30 January 1956), is a retired banker and politician. In early life he worked for the Conservative Party, but joined the UK Independence Party (UKIP) when it was founded in 1993. As a hereditary peer, he was a member of the House of Lords from 1995 to 1999.

== Early life ==
The son of John Norton, 7th Baron Grantley, Norton was born in 1956, and was the maternal grandson of William Hare, 5th Earl of Listowel, who served in Attlee's cabinet as the last Secretary of State for India and Burma, as the last Governor-General of Ghana and as Chairman of Committees in the House of Lords.

His ancestral Norton family included Richard Norton, who was attainted for his role as one of the leaders of the ill-fated Rising of the North in 1569, Sir Fletcher Norton who was Speaker of the House of Commons from 1770 to 1780 and was created Baron Grantley of Markenfield in 1782, and Caroline Norton, a celebrated author and campaigner for married women's rights in the nineteenth century.

He was educated at Garden House, Eaton House, Ampleforth College, and New College, Oxford, which he entered with an Open Scholarship in Mathematics, but graduated in Law. He was President of the Oxford Union in 1976.

== Career ==
Norton worked in the Conservative Research Department from 1977 to 1981. In 1978 he was seconded to work for the Opposition front bench in the House of Lords. During the 1979 general election campaign he worked in Margaret Thatcher's Private Office. After the election, he became a special adviser for trade and energy and wrote The Benefits of Trade, with an introduction by the then Secretary of State for Trade, Rt. Hon. John Biffen MP.

A councillor of the Royal Borough of Kensington and Chelsea from 1982 to 1986, he was the Conservative parliamentary candidate for the Wentworth constituency at the 1983 general election.

He joined the United Kingdom Independence Party on its foundation and became one of its early patrons. On 24 June 1995 he succeeded his father, John Norton, 7th Baron Grantley, and thus became UKIP's first representative in Parliament. In 1996 he made his maiden speech in the House of Lords in the presence of his maternal grandfather, the Earl of Listowel, a member of the House of Lords since 1931, a feat unlikely ever to be repeated. In 1997 he became leader of UKIP in the House of Lords. He spoke in the House on five occasions. At the time of the reforms brought about by the House of Lords Act 1999, he did not stand for election as a continuing member, and so left the House in November 1999. After UKIP he supported the Brexit Party and now supports Reform UK.

In 1981 Grantley became a banker and international project financier at Morgan Grenfell, Deutsche Bank, and HSBC. He was a director of Morgan Grenfell International Limited and of HSBC Project and Export Finance. He was head of oil and gas project finance at both institutions, and retired in 2005.

Grantley is chairman of Milner Street Area Residents' Association in Chelsea. He lives at 8 Halsey Street, Chelsea SW3 2QH. He was a patron of Save Sloane Square, which campaigned to prevent the Royal Borough of Kensington and Chelsea from turning the centre of Sloane Square into a crossroads. He also participated in the successful campaign to prevent the developers of the Chelsea Barracks site from demolishing the Garrison Church.

He was a patron of the Vaughan Parents Action Group which campaigned to prevent the Cardinal Vaughan Memorial School, one of the outstanding Catholic state schools in London, from being turned into an ordinary local school.

Grantley was a Knight of Honour and Devotion of the Sovereign Military Order of Malta for 38 years and served on the council of its British Association, and as a director of The Hospital of St John and St Elizabeth. For ten years he was a director of The Order of St John Care Homes Trust. He is a regular worshipper at the London Oratory and a long-standing devotee of the traditional Latin Mass.

Grantley is a keen bridge player. In 1972 he reached the final of the Daily Mail National Schools Bridge Competition; he was a regular member of the House of Lords bridge team in its annual matches against the House of Commons; and he was a member of the Polish Club team which won the Devonshire Cup in 2011 and 2015.
