= Charles Francis Norton =

British MP (1807 – 1835)

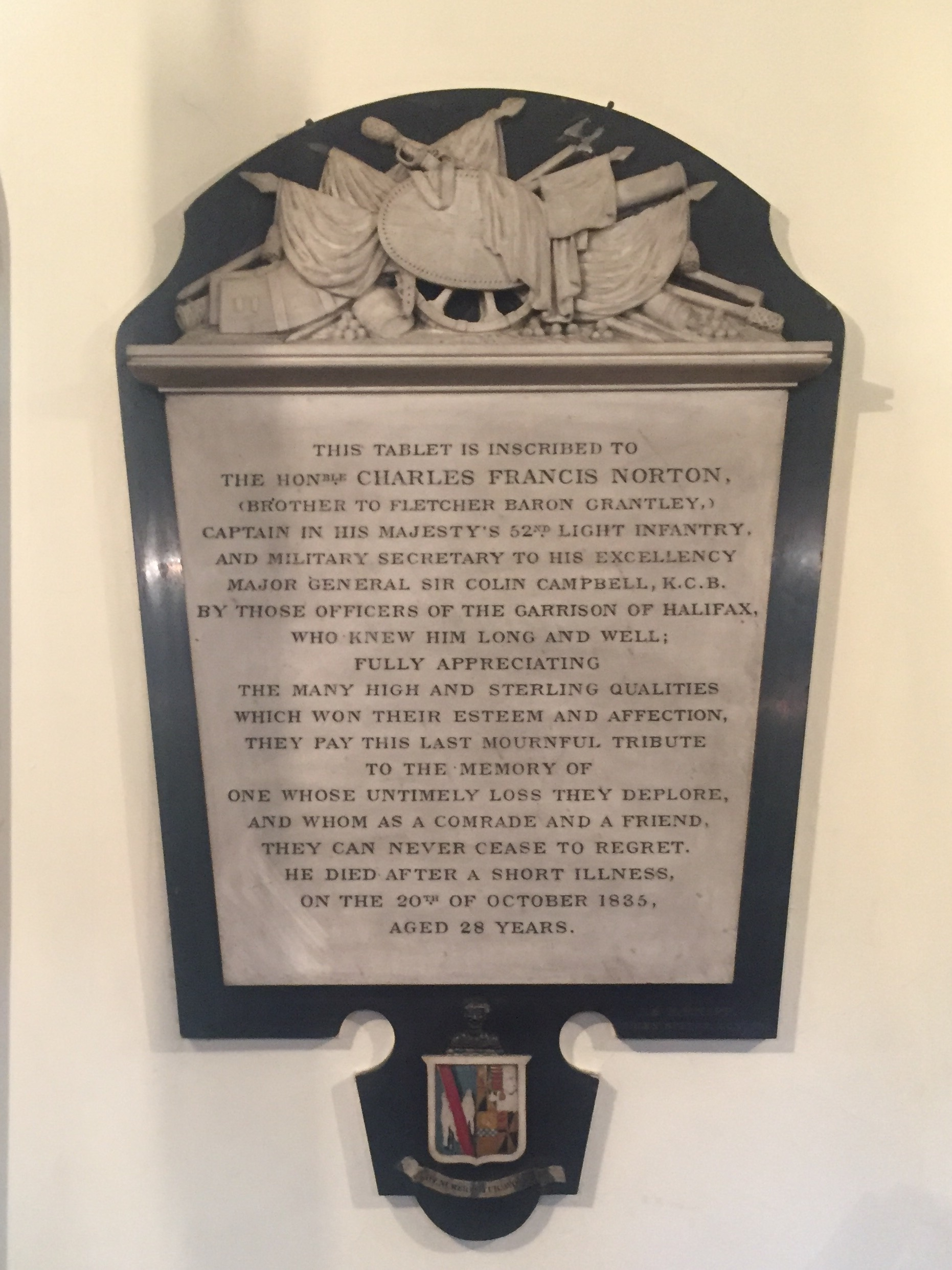
Charles Francis Norton, St. Paul's Church (Halifax), Nova Scotia

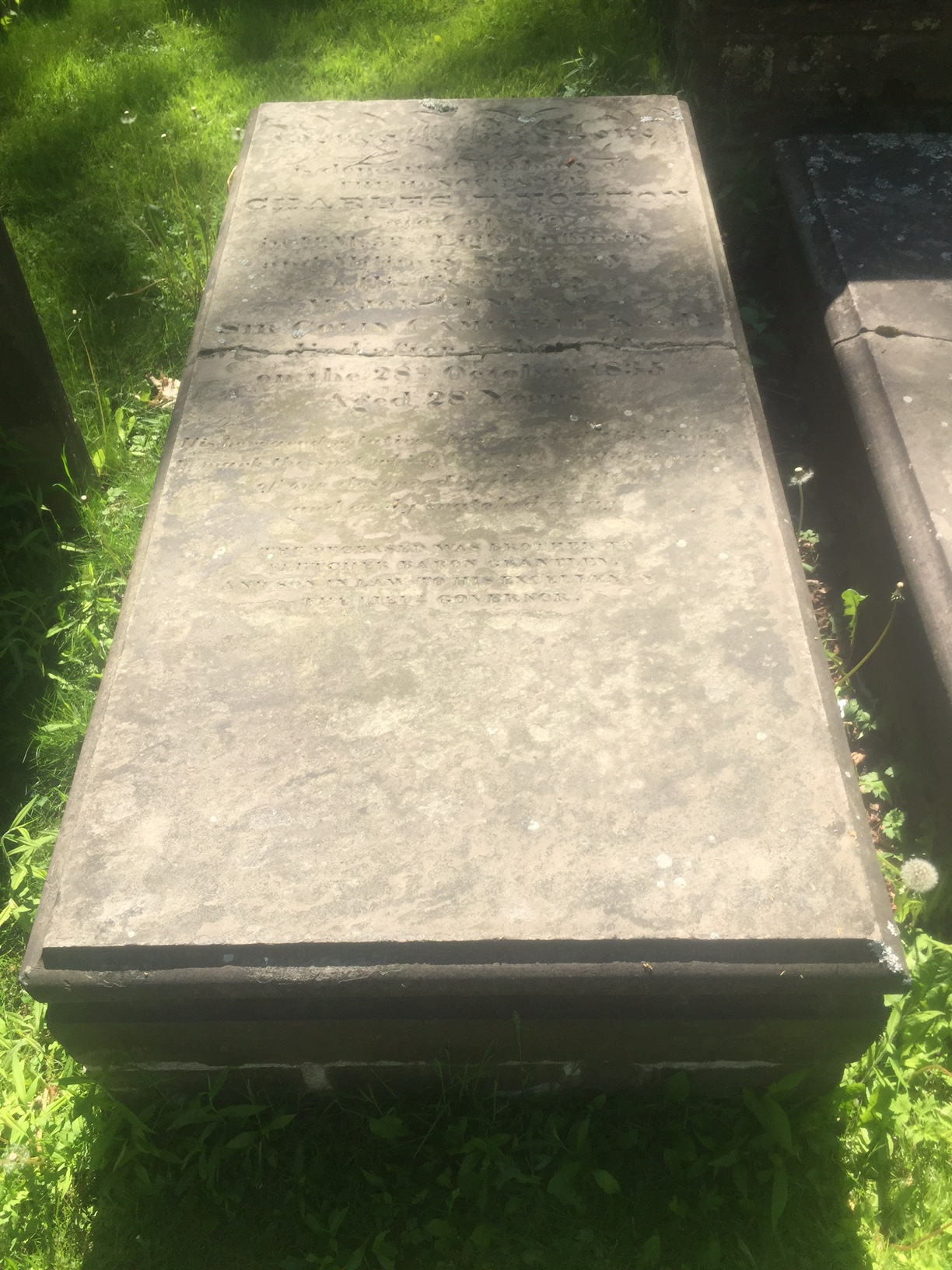
Charles Francis Norton, Old Burying Ground (Halifax, Nova Scotia)

Charles Francis Norton (1807 – 1835) was a 19th-century Member of Parliament for Guildford. Norton was also a Captain of 52nd Light Infantry. Through his wife Maria Louisa, née Campbell, he was son-in-law of Sir Colin Campbell; he was also brother-in-law of writer Caroline Norton

== Early life ==
He was the son of Fletcher Norton MP FRSE (1744–1820) and his wife, Caroline Elizabeth Balmain.

His grandfather was Hon. Fletcher Norton. His brother was Hon. Fletcher Norton, 3rd Baron Grantley. While Charles Francis Norton was a Whig, he had a brother the Hon. George Chapple Norton who was a Tory and held office in Guildford from 1826 to 1830.

Charles Francis Norton was brought up in Edinburgh, and joined the army after receiving a one seventh share of the residue of his father's estate (valued at £7,438). his regiment was stationed in Nova Scotia during the period of his service (1823–1845).

== Political career ==
Charles Francis Norton briefly entered politics. He ran as a candidate for Guildford in the general election of 1831 and emerged victorious. He held office from 1831 to 1832, losing the re-election to his conservative rival.

=== Actions during term ===
- Norton campaigned as a supporter of the grey ministry's reform bill and was returned with another reformer after a four-cornered contest.
- He divided for the second reading of the reintroduced reform bill, 6 July, and steadily for its details, except the inclusion of Guildford in schedule B, which he opposed by vote and in his only recorded speech, 29 July 1831. He argued that the town's population was ‘respectable and increasing’ and supported its petition to retain two Members by expanding the boundary, the case for which he regarded as unanswerable. He voted for the bill's passage, 21 Sept., the second reading of the Scottish bill, 23 Sept., and Lord Ebrington's confidence motion, 10 Oct.
- He was in the minority for O’Connell's motion to swear in the 11 members of the Dublin election committee, 29 July, but voted with ministers to prosecute only those found guilty of bribery, 23 Aug.
- On 5 Nov. he was granted the precedence afforded to the younger sons of peers by letter patent. He divided for the second reading of the revised reform bill (by which Guildford kept both its Members), 17 Dec.
- 1831, steadily for its details and for the third reading, 22 Mar. 1832. He voted for the address asking the king to appoint only ministers committed to carrying an unimpaired measure, 10 May, and against the Conservative amendment for increased Scottish county representation, 1 June.
- He voted against government on the Russian-Dutch loan, 26 Jan., was absent from the division on this issue 12 July, but voted with ministers, 16 July.
- He divided with them on relations with Portugal, 9 Feb. 1832.

He ran again for Guildford at the general election after his term, but was defeated by one of his Conservative rivals from the previous election.

== Later life ==
Charles Francis Norton returned to an active military career and became assistant military secretary to his father-in-law, following the latter's appointment as governor of Nova Scotia (1834), and it was there that he died suddenly in October 1835, ‘in consequence of drinking cold water, whilst over-heated in the pursuit of moose deer’. He is buried in the Old Burying Ground (Halifax, Nova Scotia).

Maria Louisa subsequently married Edmund Phipps.
