= Fletcher Norton (judge) =

British Member of Parliament (1744-1820)

Fletcher Norton FRSE (November 16, 1744 – June 19, 1820) (age 75) was a Scottish barrister and member of parliament. He was a joint founder of the Royal Society of Edinburgh in 1783.

== Life ==
He was born on 16 November 1744 the second son of Fletcher Norton, 1st Baron Grantley and his wife, Grace Chapple. He was admitted to the Middle Temple on 6 November 1755 and educated at Harrow School and Eton College 1756 to 1762.

He studied law at University College, Oxford, from 1762 and at the Middle Temple in London from 1765 and was Called to the Bar on 9 June 1769. He was appointed to the Bench on 23 January 1795.

He was MP for Appleby-in-Westmorland 1773/74 and MP for Carlisle 1774/75.

From 1776 until death he was Baron of the Exchequer in Scotland, under the title "Baron Norton", one of the longest ever in this office.

He died on 19 June 1820 at Abbeyhill in Edinburgh. His body was returned to England for burial in the family vault at Wonersh. His house was demolished to make room for Abbeyhill Station. His name is remembered in the local street names of "Norton Place" and "Norton Park".

== Family ==
In 1793 he married Caroline Elizabeth Balmain, daughter of James Balmain. Their eight children included Fletcher Norton, 3rd Baron Grantley, George Chapple Norton and Charles Francis Norton.
