= John Norton, 5th Baron Grantley =

English peer and antiquary (1855–1943)

The Right Honourable The Lord Grantley
- Born: 1 October 1855
- Died: 5 August 1943 (aged 87); London
- Education: Highgate School; Harrow School; University of Dresden
- Spouse(s): (1) Katharine Buckner Norton, née McVickar (2) Alice Jones

John Richard Brinsley Norton, 5th Baron Grantley, FSA, FRNS (1 October 1855 – 5 August 1943), was a British peer from an English landowning family. He became known also as an antiquary and a numismatist.

== Early life ==
Norton was born in Florence, Italy, the son of Thomas Norton, 4th Baron Grantley and his wife, Maria, née Federigo, and a grandson of Caroline Norton, the writer. He was educated at Highgate School from 1867 until 1869, and then at Harrow School and the University of Dresden. He inherited his father's title in 1877 and was at some time a captain in the Middlesex Yeomanry.

== Estates ==
Grantley was a Fellow of the Society of Antiquaries of London, the Royal Numismatic Society and the British Numismatic Society. His country seats were Weeke Manor in Winchester and Markenfield Hall in Ripon. He also owned Elton Manor in Nottinghamshire for a time, but seems hardly to have lived there. He purchased the Red Rice estate in 1913.

== Family ==
In 1879, Grantley caused a scandal when he married Katharine Buckner Norton (1848–1897), the daughter of Commodore William Henry McVickar, US Navy, of New York.

When they met, Katharine was married to Grantley's cousin Major Charles Grantley Campbell Norton; but after she became pregnant with Grantley's child, the marriage was annulled, and Grantley married her on 5 November 1879, five days before their daughter Joan was born. Despite her scandalous introduction to British society, Katharine went on to become a successful London hostess.

They had six children.

- Hon. Joan Mary Conyers Norton (10 November 1879 – 22 July 1942), married 11 February 1903 Edmund Henry Bevan JP, of Hilston Park, Monmouthshire (died 3 November 1945), son of Thomas Bevan of Stone Park, Greenhithe, and had issue.
- Hon. Eleanour Trehane Norton (18 July 1881 – 16 March 1951)
- Hon. Winifred Chapple Norton (18 July 1881 – 11 July 1914), married 26 June 1907 William Galbraith Tennant, eldest son of John Tennant, of The Boltons, London, and had issue.
- Hon. Katharine Edith Carlotta Norton (18 December 1883 – 9 February 1961)
- Hon. [unnamed] Norton (born and died 25 January 1889)
- Hon. Richard Henry Brinsley Norton, later 6th Baron Grantley (1892–1954)

He married secondly, in 1899, Alice Jones, also known as Alice Edwards (died 1942), the illegitimate daughter of Thomas Jones, 7th Viscount Ranelagh. Alice had been married to Grantley's friend, barrister Clement Martin Le Breton - the brother of actress Lillie Langtry. The couple's affair led to Le Breton successfully petitioning for a divorce in 1898. The divorce case made the news; Grantley and Alice married shortly after the divorce was granted.

On Grantley's death in 1943, his titles passed to his only surviving son, Richard Henry Brinsley Norton (6th Lord Grantley), a film-maker and husband of Jean Mary Kinloch.

== Arms ==
Coat of arms of John Norton, 5th Baron Grantley
Crest A Moor's Head affrontée couped at the shoulders wreathed round the temples with Laurel proper and around the neck a Torse Argent and Azure Escutcheon Azure a Maunch Ermine surmounted by a Bend Gules Supporters Dexter: a Lion; Sinister: a Griffin, both Argent and ducally gorged Or and pendent from the coronets by a Ribbon Gules a Shield of the Arms of Norton Motto Avi Numerantur Avorum (I follow a long line of ancestry)

== Sources ==
- Obituary – The Times, 6 August 1943

Peerage of Great Britain
Preceded by Thomas Norton	Baron Grantley; 1877–1943	Succeeded by Richard Norton
