= Grantley, North Yorkshire =

Village and civil parish in North Yorkshire, England

Coordinates: 54.127°N 1.647°W

Grantley
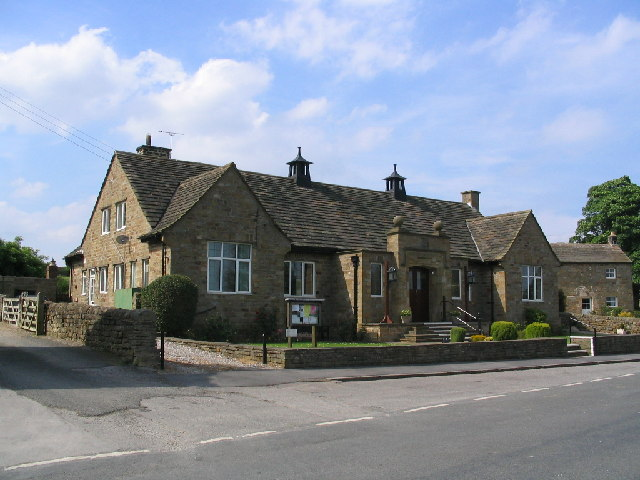
- High Grantley Village Hall

- Location within North Yorkshire
- Population: 130
- OS grid reference: SE232699
- Unitary authority: North Yorkshire
- Ceremonial county: North Yorkshire
- Region: Yorkshire and the Humber
- Country: England
- Sovereign state: United Kingdom
- Post town: RIPON
- Postcode district: HG4
- Dialling code: 01765
- Police: North Yorkshire
- Fire: North Yorkshire
- Ambulance: Yorkshire
- UK Parliament: Skipton and Ripon

Grantley is a village (also known as High Grantley) and civil parish in North Yorkshire, England. It lies 5 miles (8 km) west of Ripon. The parish also includes the hamlet of Low Grantley. The population of the parish was estimated at 130 in 2013.

The parish lies on the north bank of the River Skell, in a well-wooded valley. Grantley Sawmills is a local employer, just outside the parish on the south bank of the river. Grantley Hall, on the north bank of the river, is an 18th-century Grade II* listed building, built by Thomas Norton and his son Fletcher Norton, 1st Baron Grantley.

The toponym, first mentioned in about 1030, is Old English, and means "clearing of a man called Grante".

Grantley was historically a township in the parish of Ripon in the West Riding of Yorkshire. It became a separate civil parish in 1866, and was transferred to the new county of North Yorkshire in 1974. The parish now shares a grouped parish council with the civil parishes of Sawley, Eavestone and Skelding, known as the Grantley, Sawley, Skelding and Eavestone Parish Council. From 1974 to 2023 it was part of the Borough of Harrogate, it is now administered by the unitary North Yorkshire Council.

== See also ==
- Listed buildings in Grantley, North Yorkshire
