= Composition (fine) =

A composition is a legal procedure whereby a criminal or delinquent avoids prosecution in a court of law, potentially leading to the confiscation of his estate or some other punishment, in exchange for his payment to the authorities of a financial penalty or fine.

In general legal terminology, a "composition" is "an agreement not to prosecute in return for a consideration".

The term is from the Latin verb compono, "I put together, join" (supine compositum).

Compounding was commonly used by the victorious Parliamentarians against the Royalists after the English Civil War, for which purpose the Committee for Compounding with Delinquents was established in 1643.

== See also ==
- Bankruptcy, compounding with creditors
