= Baron Grantley =

Barony in the Peerage of Great Britain

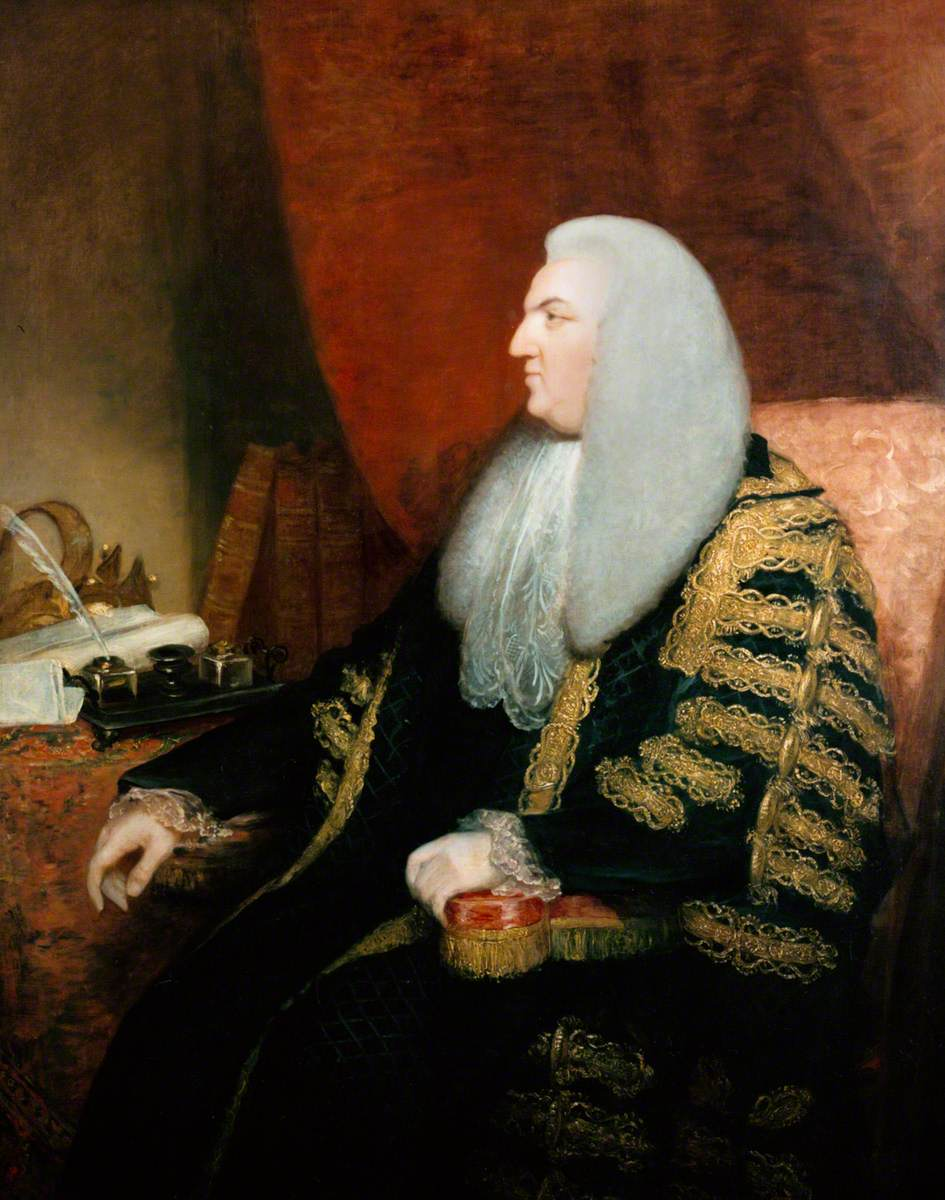
Portrait of Fletcher Norton, Speaker of the House of Commons and 1st Baron Grantley, by William Beechey

Baron Grantley, of Markenfield, in the County of York is a title in the Peerage of Great Britain. It was created on 9 April 1782 for Sir Fletcher Norton, Attorney General from 1763 to 1765 and Speaker of the House of Commons from 1770 to 1780. His son, the second Baron, was also a politician and represented Richmond, Wigtown Burghs, Guildford and Surrey in Parliament. He was succeeded by his nephew, Fletcher Norton, the third Baron. He was childless and on his death the title passed to his nephew, the fourth Baron. As of 2017 the title is held by the latter's great-great-grandson, the eighth Baron, who succeeded his father in 1995.

== Barons Grantley (1782) ==
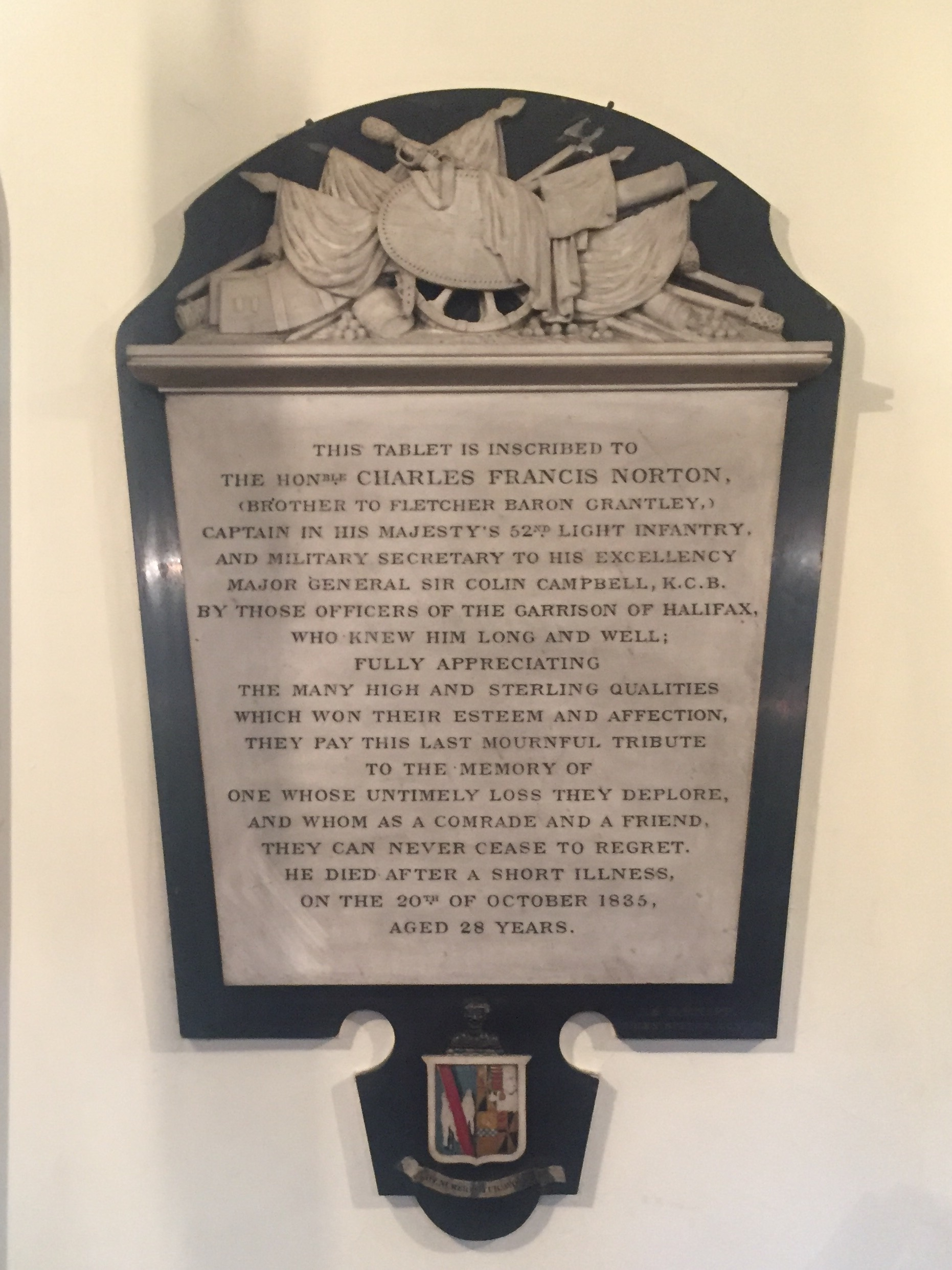
Brother of 3rd Baron - Charles Francis Norton, St. Paul's Church (Halifax), Nova Scotia

- Fletcher Norton, 1st Baron Grantley (1716–1789)
- William Norton, 2nd Baron Grantley (1742–1822). Son of 1st Baron.
- Fletcher Norton, 3rd Baron Grantley (1796–1875). Grandson of 1st Baron, nephew of 2nd Baron. His brothers were Charles Francis Norton and George Chapple Norton.
- Thomas Brinsley Norton, 4th Baron Grantley (1831–1877). Nephew of 3rd Baron, great-grandson of 1st Baron.
- John Richard Brinsley Norton, 5th Baron Grantley (1855–1943). Son of the 4th Baron.
- Richard Henry Brinsley Norton, 6th Baron Grantley (1892–1954). Son of the 5th Baron.
- John Richard Brinsley Norton, 7th Baron Grantley (1923–1995). Son of the 6th Baron.
- Richard William Brinsley Norton, 8th Baron Grantley (b. 1956). Son of the 7th Baron.

The heir presumptive is the present holder's brother, Francis John Hilary Norton (b. 1960).
The heir presumptive's heir apparent, and last in line to the peerage, is his only son John Ferenc Brinsley Norton (b. 2005)

== Arms ==
Coat of arms of Baron Grantley
Crest A Moor's head affrontee couped at the shoulders Proper wreathed round the temples with laurel and round the neck a torse Argent and Azure. Escutcheon Azure a maunch Ermine surmounted by a bend Gules. Supporters Dexter a lion and sinister a griffin both Argent and ducally gorged Or and pendent from the coronets by a red ribbon the shield of arms of Norton. Motto Avi Numerantur Avorum (I Follow A Long Line Of Ancestry)

== See also ==
- Grantley Hall

== Bibliography ==
- Hesilrige, Arthur G. M. (1921). Debrett's Peerage and Titles of courtesy. 160A, Fleet street, London, UK: Dean & Son. p. 417.
- Kidd, Charles; Williamson, David, eds. (1990). Debrett's Peerage and Baronetage. New York: St Martin's Press.
- Cokayne, G.E.; Vicary Gibbs, P.; Doubleday, H.; Howard de Walden, Lord Aubrey, eds. (1913–1958). "The Viscount Grantley". The Complete Peerage of Great Britain Extant, Dormant, Abeyant and Extinct. XIV. London: St Catherine's Press.
- Mosley, Charles, ed. (2002). "Viscount Grantley". Debrett's Peerage and Baronetage. 1 of 2. London: Cassells.
- Kidd, Charles; Williamson, David, eds. (1999). "Burke's Peerage and Baronetage". 2 (106th ed.).
