= Sawley, North Yorkshire =

Village and civil parish in North Yorkshire, England

Coordinates: 54°06′19″N 1°37′16″W

Sawley
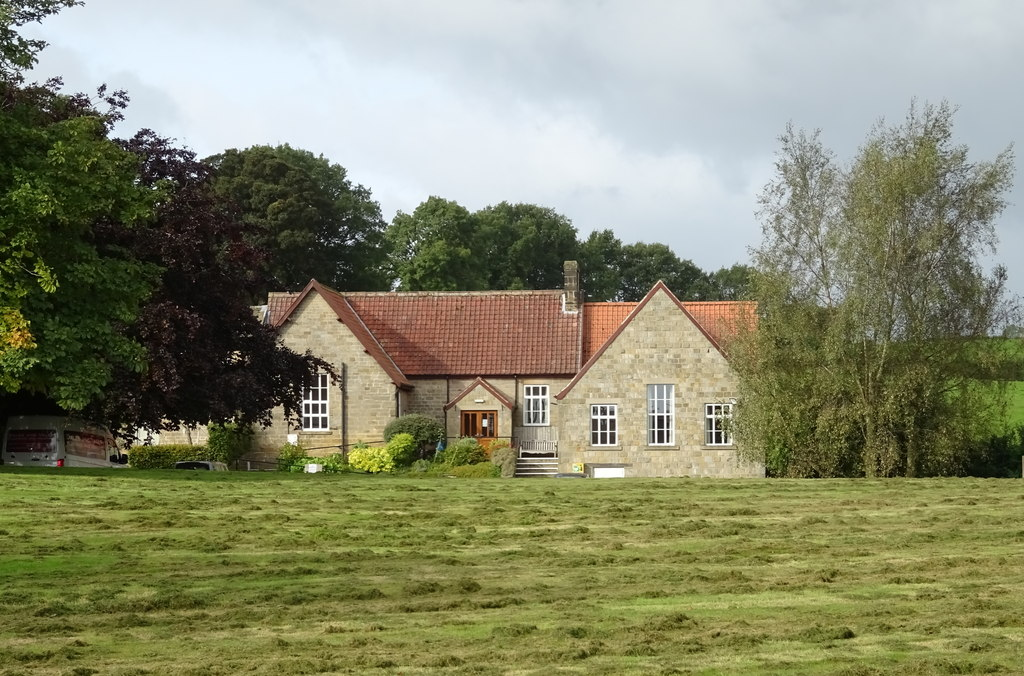
- Sawley Village Hall

- Location within North Yorkshire
- Population: 299 (2011)
- OS grid reference: SE248677
  - London: 190 mi (310 km) SSE
- Civil parish: Sawley
- Unitary authority: North Yorkshire
- Ceremonial county: North Yorkshire
- Region: Yorkshire and the Humber
- Country: England
- Sovereign state: United Kingdom
- Post town: RIPON
- Postcode district: HG4
- Police: North Yorkshire
- Fire: North Yorkshire
- Ambulance: Yorkshire
- UK Parliament: Skipton and Ripon

Sawley is a village and civil parish in the county of North Yorkshire, England. It is about 4 miles (6.4 km) west of Ripon. From this position, the Yorkshire Dales are to the west and the North Yorkshire Moors and coast are to the east. The village is located within the Nidderdale area of outstanding natural beauty.

In the 1870s, Sawley was described as "a township-chapelry, with a village and four hamlets, in Ripon parish, W. R. Yorkshire." The township's four hamlets were Cowbush, Hungate, North Pastures, and Rispleth.

== History ==
Sawley dates back to the Saxon era where it gained its name from Old English and the Anglian dialect. From this period, Sawley is directly translated as "Willow-tree wood". The village is thought to have been the main source of stone for the construction of Fountains Abbey in the 10th century. The World Heritage Site which is now maintained by the National Trust is approximately two miles away from the village.

Sawley is mentioned in the Domesday Book as "Sallai” or “Sallaia", in the Burgshire Hundred of the West Riding of Yorkshire. It comprised 18 villagers, 21 smallholders, 1 freeman, and 1 thane, with 40 ploughlands, a meadow of 85 acres (0.34 km^{2}), woodland of 1 league, a mill and a fishery. In 1066 the Lord was Ealdred, Archbishop of York St Peter. After 1086 the created Lord of the manor title was given to the new Archbishop of York, Thomas of Bayeux, who also became Tenant-in-chief.

From 1837, Sawley was part of the Ripon registration district but has been involved in several changes regarding these districts and boundaries. It became a separate civil parish in 1866. In 1946, the parish was transferred to the Claro registration district. During this same change, Sawley had a boundary change where part of the area was transferred to the parish of High and Low Bishopside. During this time, the total population which was transferred was 20. Sawley was transferred from the West Riding to the new county of North Yorkshire in 1974. Sawley remained part of the Claro registration district until 1998 when it was abolished. From this point, Sawley has been part of the North Yorkshire registration county. From 1974 to 2023 it was part of the Borough of Harrogate, it is now administered by the unitary North Yorkshire Council.

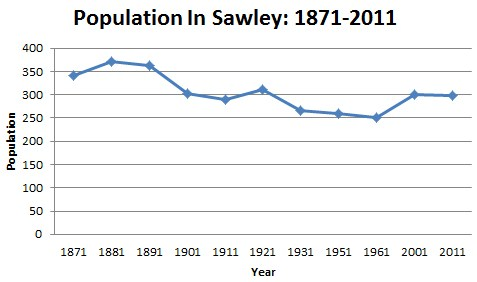
Population of Sawley, 1871–2011

Census data of Sawley dates back to 1871, with the earliest total population figure being 341. The population has been relatively constant with the highest population record being in 1881 with 372 and the lowest available data being in 1961 with 251. According to the 2011 census, Sawley had a population of 299. This is only one less than the 2001 census where the population was 300.

Historically, Sawley's economy was mainly based in agriculture with 36.7% of the working population working in this sector. This has dropped in the following years with agriculture now only accounting for 12% of Sawley's economy, based on 2011 census figures. The decline in agriculture follows a similar pattern to the rest of Britain with a major decline in agriculture due to increased trade as well as a shift towards the secondary and tertiary sector of the economy. This now means that the main industry in Sawley is now 'Wholesale and Retail Trade; Repair of Motor Vehicles and Motor Cycles', with 14.9% of people being based in this industry.

== Present day ==
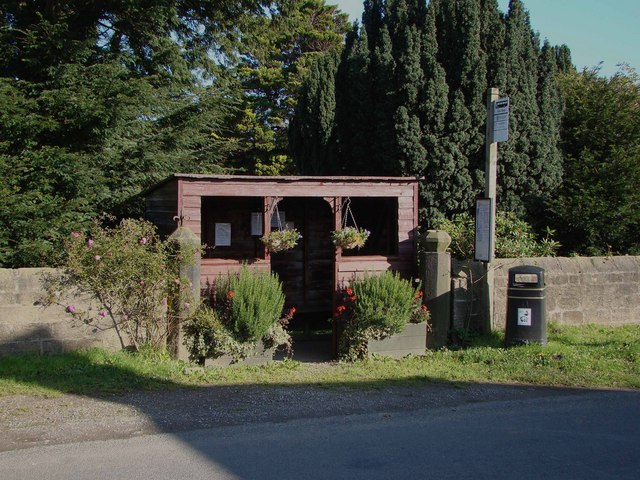
Sawley Bus Shelter

Sawley is currently described as a "hamlet or isolated settlement in inhabited countryside" by the Office for National Statistics. This can be seen with Sawley's distance to certain services. For example, the nearest railway station lies just over 9 miles (14.5 km) away from the village centre. There is also only one public bus and four school bus routes which serves the village. The main types of housing are detached and semi-detached, majority of which are privately owned. In the last six months, the average house price was £224,375, the majority being detached houses which averagely sold at £402,000.

Sawley hosts the annual 'Green Festival' and 'Jazz on the Green' afternoon as well as various other events throughout the year. Community events such as participation with the 'Yorkshire in Bloom' competition during spring and summer are put in place, giving a greater community feel.

The parish now shares a grouped parish council with the civil parishes of Grantley, Eavestone and Skelding, known as the Grantley, Sawley, Skelding and Eavestone Parish Council.

== Places of interest ==
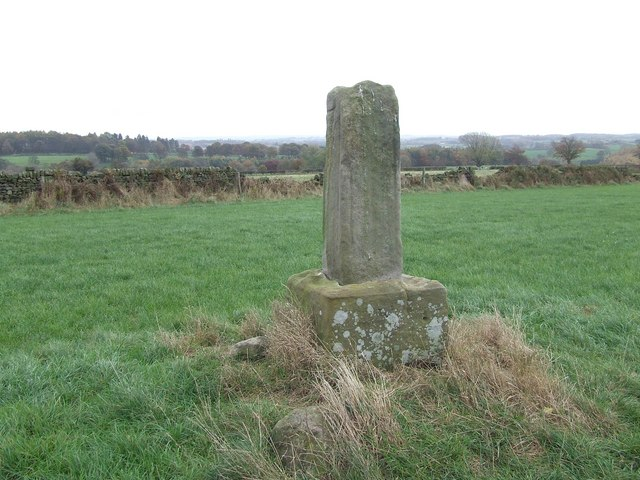
Lacon Cross

The Lacon Cross is one of 23 Grade II listed buildings in Sawley, listed on 6 March 1967. It is thought that this structure dates back to the Medieval period when it was used as a route marker by the monks from Fountains Abbey as well as travellers going through the area.

The Village Pump was installed in 1909 but before this, all water was carried from outside the village. Details about the 'wood-boxed' pump can be found on a plaque on the actual pump itself. The plaque reads, "THE VILLAGE PUMP. After male parishioners refused an offer of a piped water supply in 1905, the parish council gave permission for this hand pump to be installed in 1909. This was the principal source of water until the early 1950s when borehole water became available. A mains supply was finally connected in 1963. Some of the women of Sawley had continued to carry water in buckets for 58 years."

The Village Hall dates back to the 1790s when it was originally a school. It remained a school until 1989 and became solely a village hall. Now, the closest school to Sawley is St Joseph's Catholic Primary School which is approximately 2.2 miles (3.5 km) from the village. The closest secondary school is Outwood Academy Ripon which is about 4 miles (6.4 km) away.

Sawley Hall is also a grade II listed building, built in 1770. The Georgian house was built for Lord Grantley's wife.

Sawley Arms is a pub in Sawley. It was the location for a "reunion of the former Yorkshire and England cricketers Fred Trueman, Brian Close, Ray Illingworth and Geoffrey Boycott on 6 July 2005, four of Yorkshire's and England's greatest cricketers". It was here where artist John Blakey made a sketch of the four cricketers to mark the occasion. This would be the last place the four Yorkshire men met together due to Trueman's passing a year later.

St Michael's Church, Sawley was built in 1879, replacing an earlier building.
