= Markenfield Hall =

Coordinates: 54.10161°N 1.55104°W

- Markingfield Hall
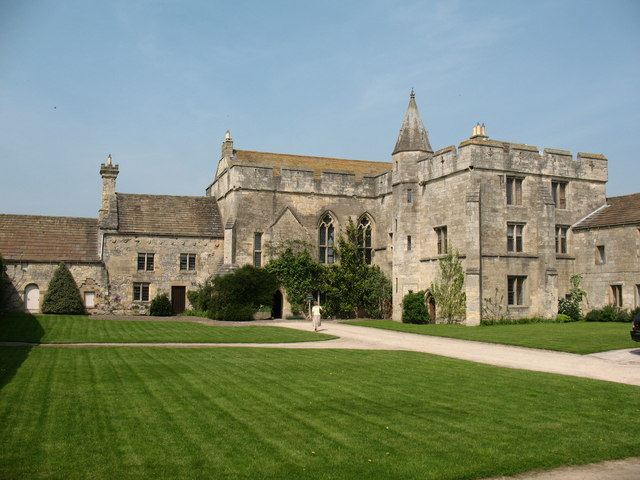
- Main block of Markenfield Hall, including chapel and great hall

- Markenfield Hall in North Yorkshire
- Type: Moated manor house
- Location: North Yorkshire
- Nearest city: Ripon
- OS grid reference: SE29466739

History
- Original use: Manor house

Site notes
- Architectural style: Gothic
- Owner: Ian and Deirdre Curteis
- Website: Markenfield Hall

Scheduled monument
- Official name: Markenfield Hall moated medieval fortified house with associated service buildings and park pale
- Designated: 31 May 1977
- Reference no.: 1018774

Listed Building – Grade I
- Official name: Markenfield Hall
- Designated: 23 April 1952
- Reference no.: 1293954

Listed Building – Grade II
- Official name: Farm buildings to the south of Markenfield Hall
- Designated: 6 March 1967
- Reference no.: 1315641

Markenfield Hall is an early 14th-century moated manor house about 3 miles (5 km) south of Ripon, North Yorkshire, England. It is in the civil parish of Markenfield Hall.

== Civil parish ==
The civil parish of Markenfield Hall has an area of only 597 acres (242 ha), and in 2015 had an estimated population of 10. In the Domesday Book of 1086 the estate was in the wapentake of Burghshire. It later became an extra parochial area, and in 1858 was made a civil parish (spelt Markingfield Hall). On 11 November 2011 the parish was renamed Markenfield Hall. It was part of the West Riding of Yorkshire until 1974, when under the Local Government Act 1972 it became part of the new county of North Yorkshire. From 1974 to 2023 it was part of the Borough of Harrogate, it is now administered by the unitary North Yorkshire Council.

== House and park ==
The house is an L-shaped castellated block, with a great hall that stands above an undercroft and was originally reached by an exterior stone staircase. It is lit by two double-light windows with quatrefoil transom under their arched heads. The house is defended by a moat, which is crossed by one bridge that is guarded by a 16th-century Tudor gatehouse. The house, including the gatehouse, is a Grade I listed building and a Scheduled Monument.

Several acres of land to the west and north of the house are emparked. The hall, adjoining land, and park pale are a Scheduled Ancient Monument listed as "Markenfield Hall moated medieval fortified house with associated service buildings and park pale".

Most years, the house is open for public tours in the afternoons for several weeks in May and June, and the property is also marketed as a wedding venue. Due to the COVID-19 pandemic in the United Kingdom however, the Hall and grounds remained temporarily closed as of June 2020 but the owners expected to be able to reopen in July, with tours not exceeding ten persons at a time on specific dates.

== History ==
The Domesday Book records two households at Markenfield in 1086.

In 1150 the estate was held by the Le Bret family who had a house there and adopted the name de Markenfield.

The present house was built for John de Markenfield, an associate of Piers Gaveston and a servant of Edward II. The Crown granted a licence to crenellate Markenfield in 1310, the same year that John was appointed Chancellor of the Exchequer. Sir Thomas Markenfield was appointed High Sheriff of Yorkshire for 1484 and fought on the side of Richard III at the Battle of Bosworth. In 1569, Thomas de Markenfield was involved in the pro-Catholic Rising of the North and fled to the Continent. Markenfield was confiscated and granted to Thomas Egerton, Master of the Rolls.

Egerton never made Markenfield his main home. It devolved to a rented farmhouse but retained its features. In 1761 Fletcher Norton, 1st Baron Grantley bought the house, replaced the roof of the Great Hall and ensured that the house was structurally sound once more. Little is known about the chapel after 1569 but in the 1880s, it was used to store grain. More recently, the chapel was fully restored. The property descended to the 7th Baron Grantley, John Richard Brinsley, who began a restoration project in 1980 to convert the hall from a farmhouse into a family home.

The historic listing summary (not recently updated) provides this description of the Hall and its modifications:

Fortified manor house, with offices and outbuildings. 1310–1323 for John de Markenfield, with late C16 additions and alterations for Sir Thomas Egerton. Further alterations c1780 for Sir Fletcher Norton first Baron Grantley of Markenfield, and C1850 by J R Walbran for the fourth Lord Grantley. Restoration 1981-4 by J S Miller for seventh Lord Grantley.

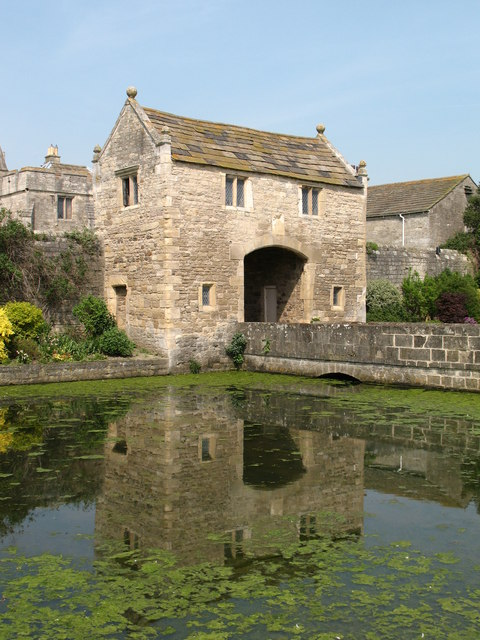
Part of the moat, with the 16th-century Tudor gatehouse

The major restoration started in 1980 was completed in 2008 although smaller restoration projects were expected to continue until about 2030. A restoration of the Gatehouse and Farmhouse gardens started in 2014 with a new replanting in 2015. The final garden restoration started in 2016 and was completed in 2018.

A news item about the property in May 2019 provided an update with photographs of the interior. The occupant at that time was Lady Deirdre, known as Lady Grantley for some years (née Deirdre Elisabeth Mary Freda Hare) and more recently, as Lady Deirdre Curteis, widow of the 7th Lord Grantley, who had died in 1995. Lady Deirdre married her second husband, Ian Bayley Curteis, the dramatist and television director, in 2001. The ceremony was held in the chapel which had been restored and refurnished by that time; this was the first wedding to be held there since 1487. Ian Curteis died on 24 November 2021, aged 86.

== Toponym ==
The place name was first recorded in the Domesday Book of 1086 as Merchefeld. The name is probably from Old English mercinga "of the boundary people" and feld "open land", so meaning "open field of the boundary people". The first element is the same as that of the name of the nearby settlement of Markington. The forms Markingfield (first recorded in the 12th century) and Markenfield (first recorded in the 13th century) are both ancient, and it is not clear which is the older version. The form Markenfield came to be attached to the family which lived there in the Middle Ages. In the 19th century both forms were used both for the Hall and for the eponymous extra-parochial area which became the civil parish.

== See also ==
- Grade I listed buildings in North Yorkshire (district)
- Listed buildings in Markenfield Hall

== Bibliography ==
- Pevsner, Nikolaus; Radcliffe, Enid (revision) (1967) [1959]. Yorkshire the West Riding. The Buildings of England. Harmondsworth: Penguin Books. pp. 359–360. ISBN 0-14-071017-5.
- Sykes, Christopher Simon (1988). Ancient English Houses 1240–1612. London: Chatto & Windus. p. 14. ISBN 0701131764.
