= William Norton, 2nd Baron Grantley =

British politician

William Norton, 2nd Baron Grantley (19 February 1742 – 12 November 1822) was a British politician who sat in the House of Commons from 1768 to 1789 when he succeeded to the peerage as Baron Grantley.

Norton was the son of Fletcher Norton, 1st Baron Grantley, who was created a peer on 9 April 1782, from which time William Norton was styled 'the Honourable'. He was educated at St John's College, Cambridge.

Norton was Member of Parliament for Richmond 1768–1774, for Wigtown Burghs 1774–1775 (unseated on petition), Richmond 1775–1780, Guildford 1782–1784 and Surrey 1784–1789. He became the 2nd Lord Grantley on 1 January 1789.

He was the third Englishman to be elected and the second to actually sit in Parliament, for the Scottish constituency of Wigtown Burghs.

== Arms ==
Coat of arms of William Norton, 2nd Baron Grantley
Crest A Moor's Head affrontée couped at the shoulders wreathed round the temples with Laurel proper and around the neck a Torse Argent and Azure Escutcheon Azure a Maunch Ermine surmounted by a Bend Gules Supporters Dexter: a Lion; Sinister: a Griffin, both Argent and ducally gorged Or and pendent from the coronets by a Ribbon Gules a Shield of the Arms of Norton Motto Avi Numerantur Avorum (I follow a long line of ancestry)

Parliament of Great Britain
Preceded by Sir Lawrence Dundas, Bt; Alexander Wedderburn	Member of Parliament for Richmond; 1768–1774; With: Alexander Wedderburn to 1769; Charles John Crowle from 1769	Succeeded by Sir Lawrence Dundas, Bt; Thomas Dundas
Preceded by William Stewart	Member of Parliament for Wigtown Burghs; 1774–1775	Succeeded by Henry Watkin Dashwood
Preceded by Thomas Dundas; Charles Dundas, 1st Baron Amesbury	Member of Parliament for Richmond; 1775–1780; With: Charles Dundas, 1st Baron Amesbury	Succeeded by Marquess of Graham; Sir Lawrence Dundas, Bt
Preceded by Fletcher Norton; George Onslow	Member of Parliament for Guildford; 1782–1784; With: George Onslow	Succeeded by Viscount Cranley; Chapple Norton
Preceded by Sir Robert Clayton; Sir Joseph Mawbey, Bt	Member of Parliament for Surrey; 1784–1789; With: Sir Joseph Mawbey, Bt	Succeeded by Lord William Russell; Sir Joseph Mawbey, Bt
Peerage of Great Britain
Preceded by Fletcher Norton	Baron Grantley; 1789–1822	Succeeded by Fletcher Norton
