= Grantley Hall =

Country house, now hotel, in North Yorkshire, England

Coordinates: 54.11884°N 1.63157°W

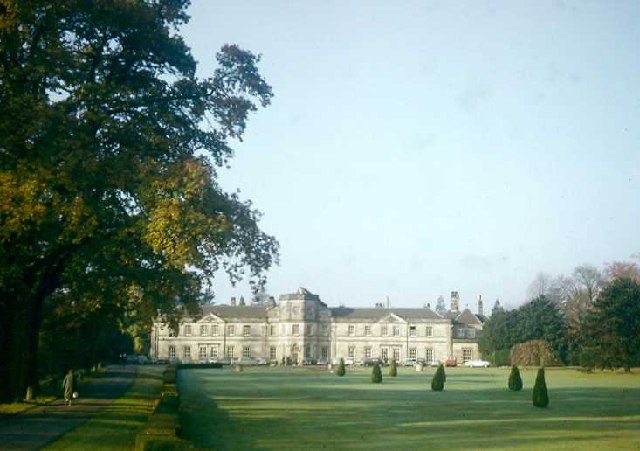
Front of Grantley Hall in 1964

Grantley Hall is an English country house located in North Yorkshire, England, in use as a hotel. It is situated near Grantley, about 5 miles (8 km) to the west of Ripon, on the banks of the River Skell. It is listed Grade II* on the National Heritage List for England, and the Japanese garden at the hall is listed Grade II on the Register of Historic Parks and Gardens.

The house was built by Thomas Norton and his son Fletcher Norton, 1st Baron Grantley in the mid-18th century, apparently based on a Palladian design by Isaac Ware. Additions in the 1760s have been attributed to John Carr, who knew Fletcher Norton. The house was extended during the 19th and early 20th centuries to form the house as it stands today.

The building was used as a convalescent home during the Second World War. Between 1947 and 1974, the house was under the ownership of West Riding County Council, who purchased the property to use as an adult education residential college before it passed to North Yorkshire County Council in 1974 and became a training and conference centre. The building opened in 2019 as a "luxury hotel and wellness retreat".

Other buildings on the Grantley Estate include the Ellis Building and the East Lodge.

== Norton family ==
Thomas Norton built Grantley Hall in about 1710 shortly before his marriage. His father had become the owner of the Grantley Estate in the previous century and he inherited it. In 1712 he married Elizabeth Serjeantson, the daughter of William Serjeantson of Hanlith. There is an elaborate memorial to Elizabeth in Ripon Cathedral. He died in 1719 at the age of 36 leaving his wife with four small children, three sons and a daughter. His eldest son Fletcher Norton was only 3 years old when he inherited the Grantley estate.

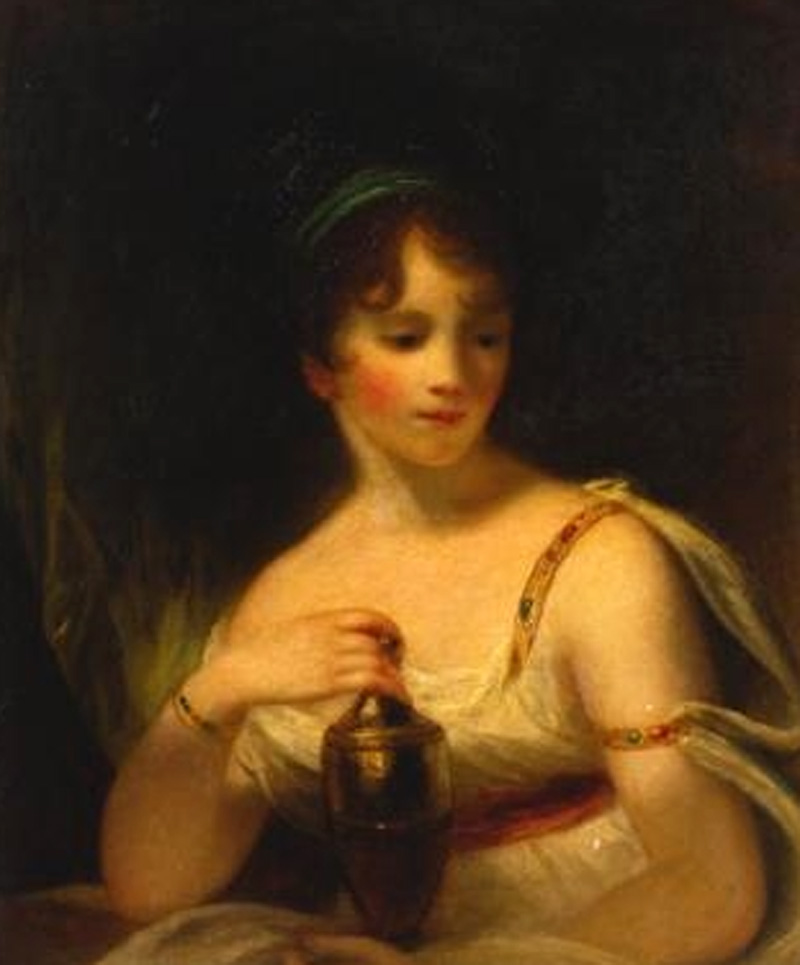
Lady Charlotte Earle Norton, daughter of Sir William Beechey and wife of the 3rd Lord Grantley

Lord Fletcher Norton studied law and became a Member of Parliament. In 1762 he received a knighthood and in the following year became Attorney-General and later Speaker of the House. In 1741 he married Grace Chapple (1711–1803) who was the daughter of Sir William Chapple, a Judge on the Kings Bench. It seems that in about 1760 he made substantial additions to Grantley Hall. In 1782 when he retired he was titled Lord Grantley, Baron of Markenfield. Markenfield Hall is a nearby property which he also owned. He died in 1789 and his son William Norton, 2nd Baron Grantley inherited Grantley Hall.

Lord William Norton was born in 1742 and became a Member of Parliament. In 1791 he married Anna Margaretta Midgeley. They had two sons but both died in infancy. His wife also died several years after they were married. When William died in 1822 Grantley Hall was inherited by his nephew Fletcher Norton.

Lord Fletcher Norton, 3rd Lord Grantley was born in 1798. In 1825 he married Charlotte Earle Beechey who was the daughter of Sir William Beechey, the famous portraitist. Sir William painted a portrait of his daughter which is shown.

Lord Fletcher Norton decided on a military career and was an officer in the Grenadier Guards. He fought at the Battle of Waterloo where he was wounded. He inherited Grantley Hall at the age of 24 and managed the Estate until his death in 1875. As he had no children his nephew Thomas Brindsley Norton inherited the Estate. Thomas was the son of the famous social reformer and author Caroline Norton, about whom many books have been written.

Thomas died only two years after he inherited the property at the age of 47 and his son John Richard Brindsley Norton became the owner in 1877. John Richard Brindsley Norton, 5th Lord Grantley was born in 1855. In 1879 he caused a public sensation by marrying Katherine, the wife of his cousin, after being named as co-respondent in a divorce case. Katherine was from New York and was the daughter of Commodore McVickar of the New York Yacht Club and founding member of the Knickerbocker Club. In 1900 John sold Grantley hall to Sir Christopher Furness.

His son Richard, 6th Lord Grantley wrote a book called Silver Spoon. In it he records his memoirs and describes Grantley Hall as "a gargantuan edifice with sixty bedrooms, on the edge of sixteen thousand acres of wild moorland. This was the home of most of my own boyhood."

He describes his father John as "a huge man — he was well over six feet — with blue eyes, a heavy moustache, and wavy hair which kept its wave and its thickness long after, in later life, it went white." He says his mother Katherine "was far from being the typically useless rich woman of that particularly pretentious period. She was a charitable and generous friend and employer and while up at Grantley would herself see that no tenant was ever in distress without her giving help."

== Furness family ==
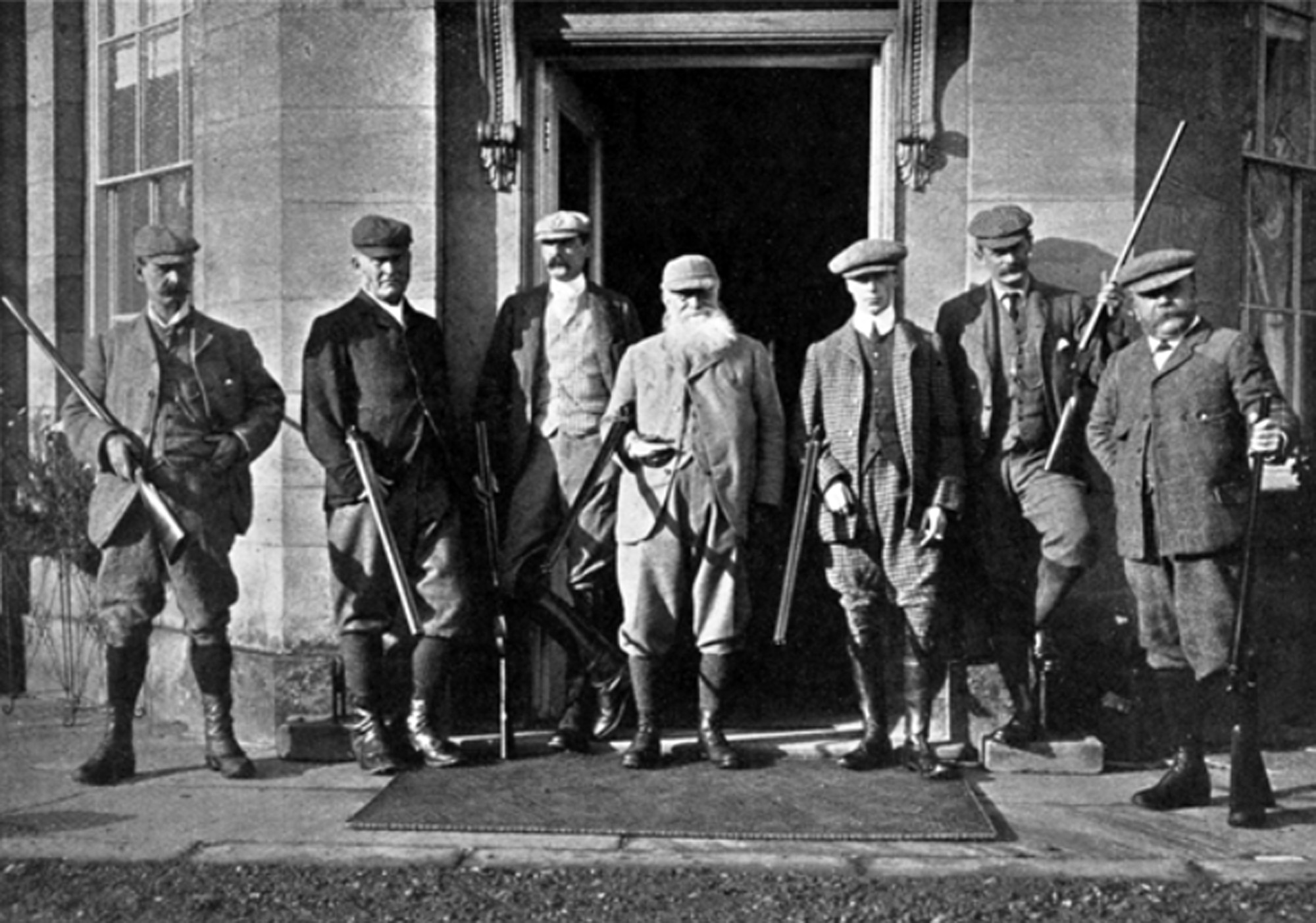
Shooting party at Grantley Hall in 1902. Sir Christopher Furness is at far right and his son Marmaduke (aged 19) is the third from the right

Sir Christopher Furness, 1st Baron Furness, who bought Grantley Hall in 1900, was the owner of the shipping company called the Furness Line. He came from humble beginnings, his father at one time being a coal miner. However he later founded a large grocery business in Hartlepool. Christopher went into the family business but later began to buy boats and started his own shipping line which was extremely successful. He became a multimillionaire and bought numerous properties. He was also a Member of Parliament representing Hartlepool. In 1876 he married Jane Annette Suggitt and the couple had one son.

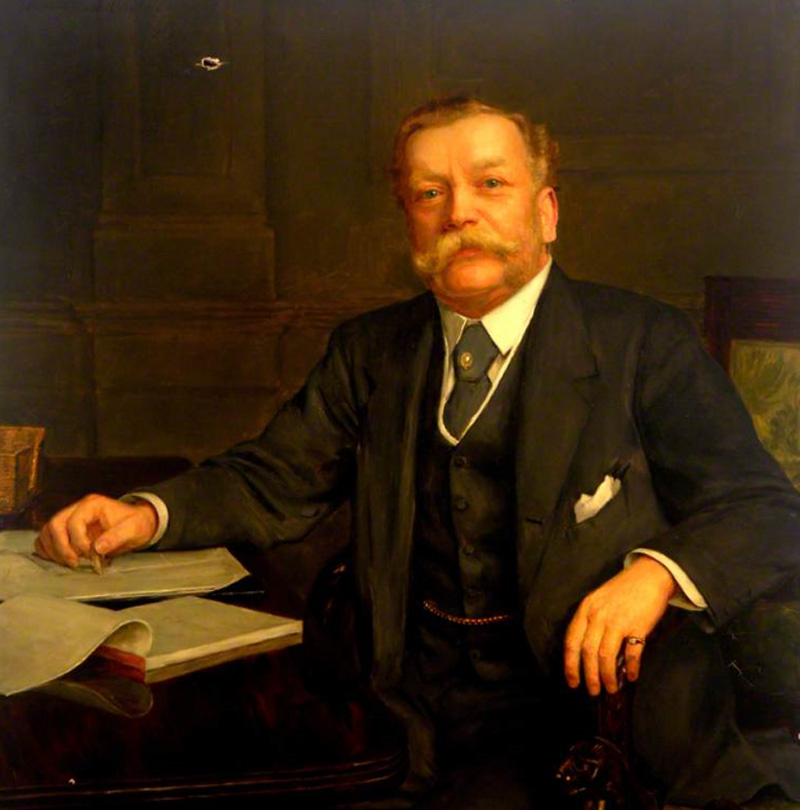
Sir Christopher Furness

In 1905 a reporter from the magazine The Car Illustrated visited the house and described the estate in detail in a feature article. They said.

The mansion is stone built, and charmingly situate on the River Skell, which is widened into a series of lakes skirting the drive through the park, which with its pleasure grounds covers about forty seven acres. The entrance hall on the east front of the mansion opens to a corridor forming a picture gallery, through which a passage issues north and south, giving access to the principal reception rooms. The southern end of the mansion contains a spacious hall, with fireplace, smoking-room, study.

Lady Jane Furness was a keen gardener and created one of the earliest Japanese gardens in the country in about 1910. It is listed on the English Heritage Register. The garden features two ponds linked by a stream with large, irregular stepping stones as well as a diverse variety of trees, mosses, ferns and bamboo. When Christopher died in 1912 his son Marmaduke inherited the house but Lady Jane retained a life interest in the property.

Sir Marmaduke Furness continued in the family business and succeeded in expanding it. He was married three times. His first wife was Ada Daisy Hogg who was the daughter of George Hogg of "The Gables" Seaton Carew. Their marriage in 1904 was widely reported in the newspapers. The Couple had a son and a daughter. Unfortunately Daisy died in 1921 at the age of 41 on board their boat shortly after she had an operation. In 1926 Marmaduke married Thelma Morgan, the famous woman who was reputed to be the mistress of Prince Edward. They were divorced in 1933 and soon after he married Enid Maud Lindeman.

In 1925 Marmaduke sold Grantley Hall to Sir William Henry Aykroyd.

== The Aykroyd family ==
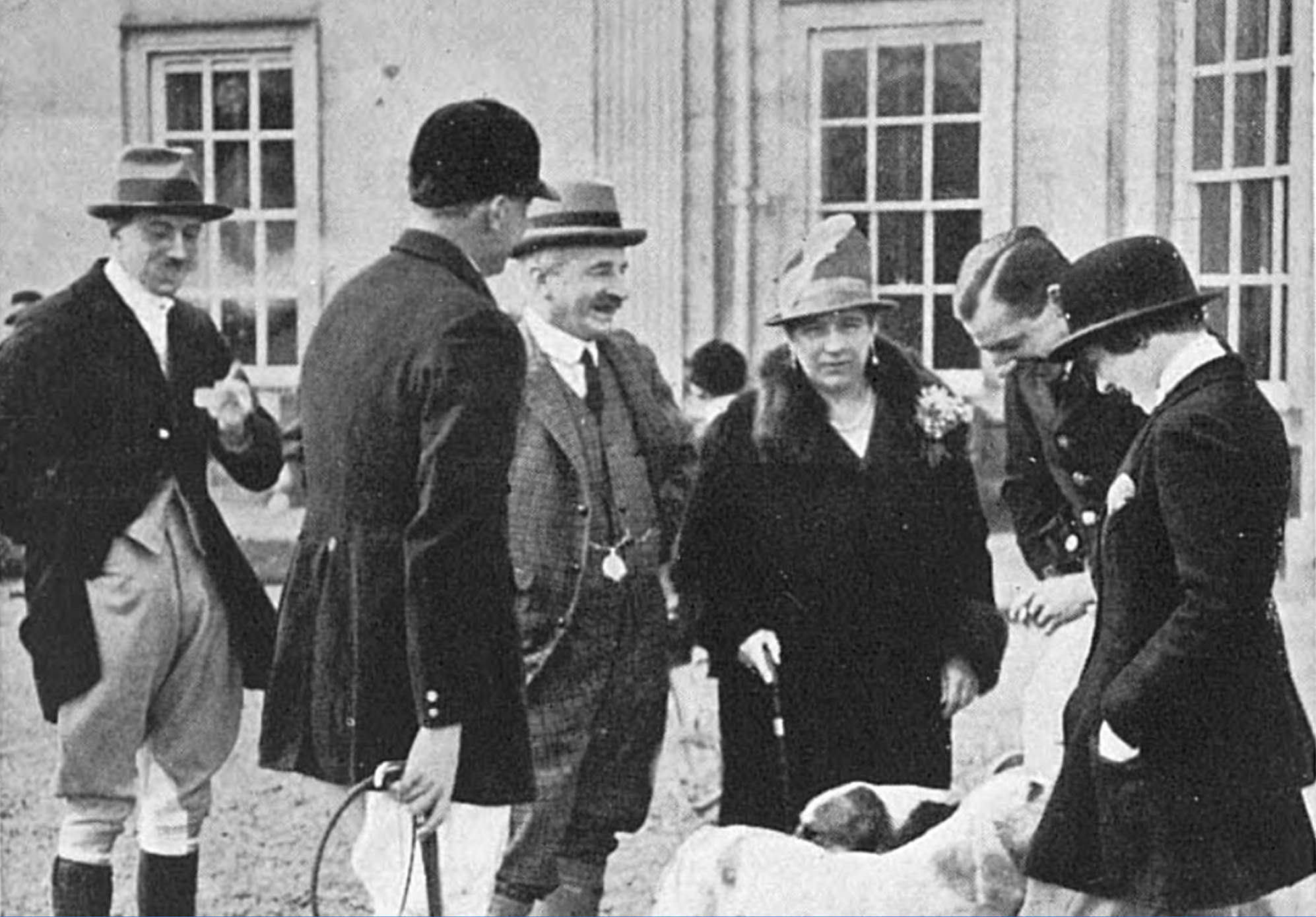
Sir William and Lady Emma Aykroyd (centre) in 1927 at Grantley Hall

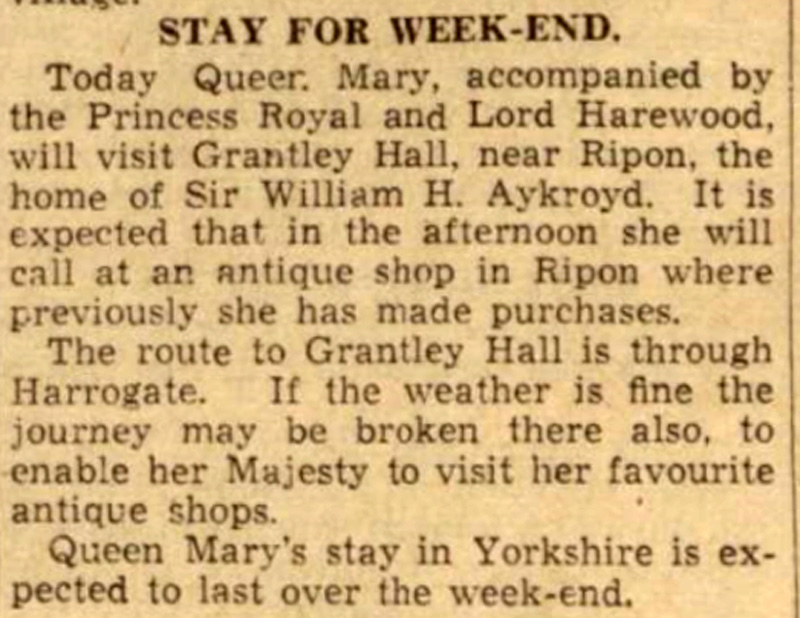
Newspaper report of Queen Mary at Grantley Hall in 1937

Sir William Henry Aykroyd was a woollen carpet manufacturer. He entered the family business soon after leaving school and eventually became the chairman. In 1890 he married Emma Louisa Hammond, daughter of Ezra Waugh Hammond of Horton Hall, Bradford. The couple had three sons and one daughter.

The Aykroyd family continued to develop the garden and often opened it to the public. A newspaper of 1937 contained a detailed description of the grounds. Some of the report is as follows.

An air of immense well-being characterises the extensive grounds which surround Grantley Hall, the home of Sir William Aykroyd. The timber is well cared for; the lawns smooth, level, unmarred by weeds; the rock garden is full of rare and beautiful plants and even the Golden Orfe in its pools have an exceptionally sleek and prosperous look.

Sir William and Lady Emma were personal friends of the Royal Family. In 1937 Queen Mary stayed at Grantley Hall accompanied by her daughter Princess Mary and her son in law Lord Harewood. The visit was widely reported in the newspapers and one of these reports is shown.

During the Second World War, Grantley Hall was used as a convalescence home for injured soldiers. A hospital supply depot was formed in the Cathedral Hall in Ripon and Lady Aykroyd was the chairman.

Sir William died in 1947 and Grantley Hall was sold to the West Riding County Council.

== History from 1947 to 2015 ==
West Riding County Council ran the hall as a residential adult education centre, with week-long and weekend courses on offer. In 2006 the property was sold to a private purchaser for residential use. After a period of limited use. The property was left largely untouched for nearly a decade before being purchased in 2015 by the Sykes family, and planning permission was granted for conversion of the building into a 50 bedroom hotel.

== Hotel ==
The current owner bought the house in 2015 and opened Grantley Hall as a "luxury hotel and wellness retreat" in July 2019. It was named the "Best Countryside Hotel in the UK" and "Best Service in the UK" by Conde Nast in 2023.

== See also ==
- Grade II* listed buildings in North Yorkshire (district)
- Listed buildings in Grantley, North Yorkshire
