= Fletcher Norton, 1st Baron Grantley =

English lawyer and politician (1716–1789)

The Right Honourable The Lord Grantley PC
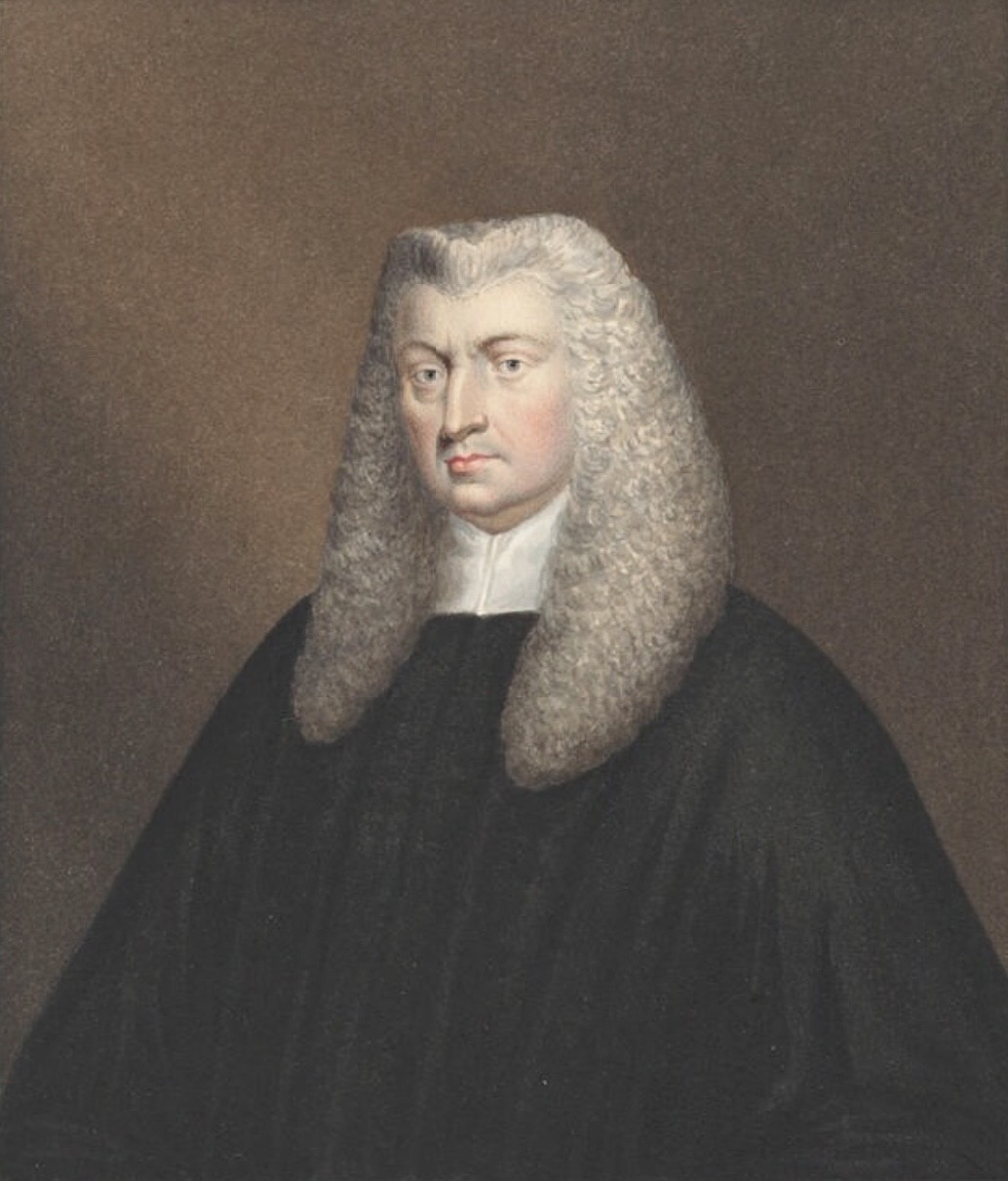
- Posthumous Portrait attributed to Thomas Athow, c. 1806-1822

Speaker of the House of Commons of Great Britain

Member of Parliament for Guildford
- In office 22 January 1770 – 31 October 1780
- Monarch: George III
- Prime Minister: Augustus FitzRoy; Frederick North
- Preceded by: John Cust
- Succeeded by: Charles Wolfran Cornwall

Solicitor General for England and Wales
- In office 1762–1763
- Preceded by: Charles Yorke
- Succeeded by: William de Grey

Member of the Great Britain Parliament for Appleby
- In office 1756–1761 Serving with Philip Honywood
- Preceded by: William Lee; Philip Honywood
- Succeeded by: John Stanwix; Philip Honywood

Member of the Great Britain Parliament for Wigan
- In office 1761–1768 Serving with Simon Luttrell
- Preceded by: Sir William Meredith; Richard Barry
- Succeeded by: George Byng; Beaumont Hotham
- In office 1768–1782 Serving with George Onslow
- Preceded by: Sir John Elwill; George Onslow
- Succeeded by: William Norton; George Onslow

Attorney General for England and Wales
- In office 1763–1765
- Preceded by: Charles Yorke
- Succeeded by: Charles Yorke

Justice in Eyre South of the Trent
- In office 1769–1789
- Preceded by: Lord Cornwallis
- Succeeded by: Thomas Townshend

Personal details
- Born: 23 June 1716
- Died: 1 January 1789 (aged 72)
- Spouse: Grace Chapple
- Children: 5

Fletcher Norton, 1st Baron Grantley, PC (23 June 1716 – 1 January 1789) was an English lawyer and politician who sat in the House of Commons from 1756 to 1782 when he was raised to the peerage as Baron Grantley.

== Life and career ==
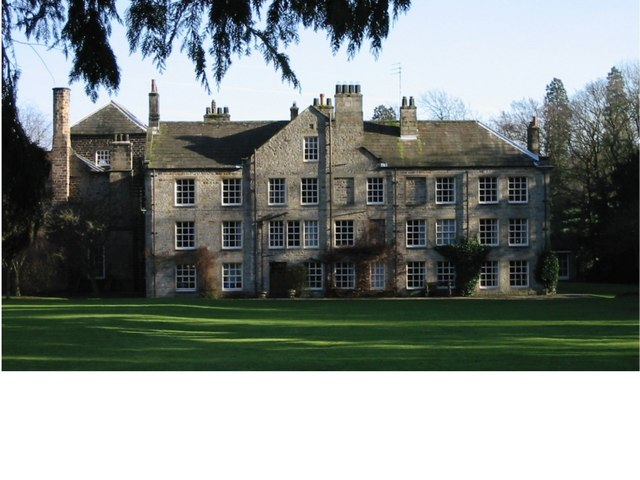
Grantley Hall, North Yorkshire

Norton was the eldest son of Thomas Norton of Grantley, Yorkshire. He was educated at St John's College, Cambridge and the Middle Temple, being called to the bar in 1739. After a period of inactivity, he built up a profitable practice, becoming a King's Counsel in 1754, and later attorney-general for the county palatine of Lancaster.

With his father he ordered the building in the mid-1700s of Grantley Hall, near Ripon in North Yorkshire.

In 1756, Norton was elected Member of Parliament for Appleby; he represented Wigan from 1761 to 1768, and was appointed solicitor-general for England and knighted in 1762. He took part in the proceedings against John Wilkes, and, having become Attorney General for England and Wales in 1763, prosecuted William Byron, 5th Baron Byron, for the murder of William Chaworth. However, he lost his office when the Marquess of Rockingham came to power in July 1765.

In 1769, as MP for Guildford, Norton became a privy councillor and chief Justice in Eyre of the forests south of the Trent, and in 1770 was elected Speaker of the House of Commons. In 1777, when presenting the bill for the increase of the civil list to the king, he told George III that "parliament has not only granted to your majesty a large present supply, but also a very great additional revenue; great beyond example; great beyond your majesty's highest expense." This speech aroused general attention and caused some irritation; but the Speaker was supported by Charles James Fox and by the city of London, and received the thanks of the House of Commons.

The king did not forget these plain words, and after the general election of 1780, the prime minister, Lord North, and his followers declined to support the re-election of the retiring Speaker, alleging that his health was not equal to the duties of the office, and he was defeated when the voting took place. In 1782 he was made a peer as Baron Grantley of Markenfield in the County of York.

He was elected a Fellow of the Royal Society in 1776.

== Death ==
He died in 1789 at his London home in Lincoln's Inn Fields and was buried at Wonersh, Surrey. In 1741 he had married Grace, the daughter and heiress of Sir William Chapple, Justice of the King's Bench, 1737–1745. They had 5 sons and 2 daughters. He was succeeded as Baron Grantley by his eldest son William (1742–1822).

Nathaniel William Wraxall described Norton as a bold, able and eloquent, but not a popular pleader, and as Speaker he was aggressive and indiscreet. Derided by satirists as "Sir Bullface Doublefee," and described by Horace Walpole as one who rose from obscure infamy to that infamous fame which will long stick to him, his character was also assailed by "Junius".

== Family ==
Grantley married Grace Chapple, daughter and heir of Sir William Chapple, Justice of the King's bench, on 21 May 1741. They had four sons and a daughter:

- William Norton, 2nd Baron Grantley (1742–1822)
- Hon. Fletcher Norton MP FRSE (1744–1820); father of Fletcher Norton, 3rd Baron Grantley, Hon. Charles Francis Norton and Hon. George Chapple Norton
- Hon. Chapple Norton (1746–1818)
- Hon. Edward Norton (1750–1786)
- Hon. Grace Norton (1752–1813), married John Wallop, 3rd Earl of Portsmouth

== Arms ==
Coat of arms of Fletcher Norton, 1st Baron Grantley
| Crest A Moor's Head affrontée couped at the shoulders wreathed round the temples with Laurel proper and around the neck a Torse Argent and Azure Escutcheon Azure a Maunch Ermine surmounted by a Bend Gules Supporters Dexter: a Lion; Sinister: a Griffin, both Argent and ducally gorged Or and pendent from the coronets by a Ribbon Gules a Shield of the Arms of Norton Motto Avi Numerantur Avorum (I follow a long line of ancestry) |

== See also ==
- Baron Grantley

Parliament of Great Britain
| Preceded by William Lee; Philip Honywood | Member of Parliament for Appleby; 1756–1761; With: Philip Honywood | Succeeded by John Stanwix; Philip Honywood |
| Preceded by Sir William Meredith, Bt; Hon. Richard Barry | Member of Parliament for Wigan; 1761–1768; With: Simon Luttrell | Succeeded by George Byng; Beaumont Hotham |
| Preceded by Sir John Elwill, Bt; George Onslow | Member of Parliament for Guildford; 1768–1782; With: George Onslow | Succeeded by William Norton; George Onslow |
Legal offices
| Preceded by Charles Yorke | Solicitor General for England and Wales; 1762–1763 | Succeeded by William de Grey |
| Preceded by Charles Yorke | Attorney General for England and Wales; 1763–1765 | Succeeded by Charles Yorke |
| Preceded by The Earl Cornwallis | Justice in Eyre south of the Trent; 1769–1789 | Succeeded by The Viscount Sydney |
Political offices
| Preceded by Sir John Cust | Speaker of the House of Commons of Great Britain; 1770–1780 | Succeeded by Charles Wolfran Cornwall |
Peerage of Great Britain
| New creation | Baron Grantley; 1782–1789 | Succeeded by William Norton |
