= 1851 in literature =

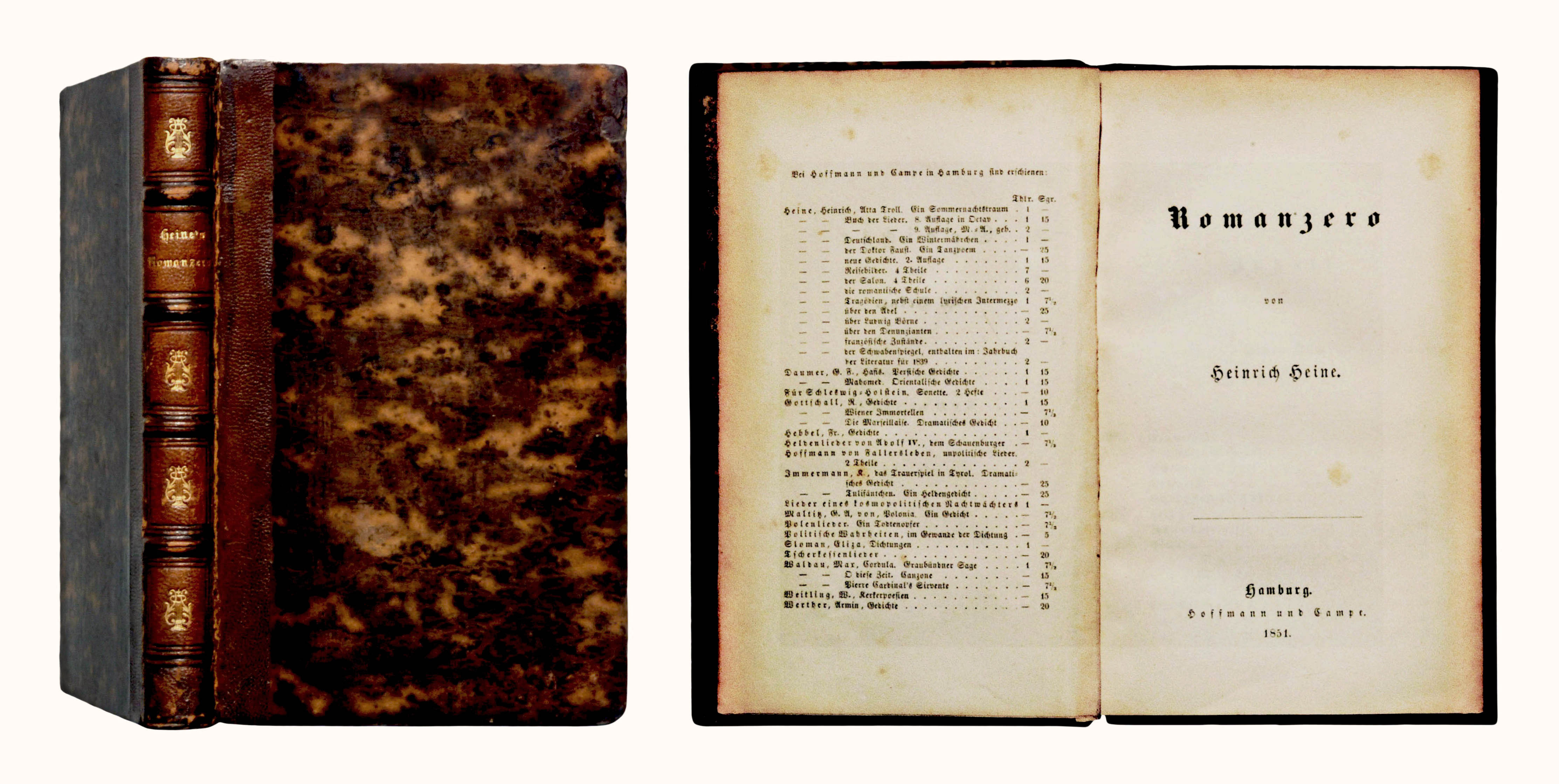
Heinrich Heine’s Romanzero

This article contains information about the literary events and publications of 1851.

== Events ==
- January 1 – The Caucasian Georgian theatre company gives its first performance, under the direction of Giorgi Eristavi.
- June 5 – Harriet Beecher Stowe's novel Uncle Tom's Cabin begins serialization in the American abolitionist weekly The National Era. The story was originally intended as a shorter narrative that would run for only a few weeks. Stowe expanded the story significantly, however, and it was instantly popular, such that protests were sent to the Era office when she missed an issue. The final installment was released in the April 1, 1852, issue of Era. Stowe arranged for the story's copyright to be registered with the United States District Court for the District of Maine. She renewed her copyright in 1879 and the work entered the public domain on May 12, 1893.
- June – While waiting to cross the English Channel on his honeymoon, Matthew Arnold probably begins to compose the poem "Dover Beach".
- September 29 – Marian Evans, the future George Eliot, takes up an appointment as (assistant) editor of the Westminster Review, published by John Chapman. In this capacity she will meet G. H. Lewes.
- November 14 – Herman Melville's novel Moby-Dick; or, The Whale is published in full, in a single volume, for the first time, by Harper & Brothers in New York, having been previously issued on October 18 as The Whale in an abridged three-volume edition by Richard Bentley in London.
- December 2 – The French coup d'état of 1851 prompts Victor Hugo to be a leader of an unsuccessful insurrection against it. He is forced into exile, initially to Brussels.
- December 24 – A fire at the Library of Congress in Washington, D.C., destroys 35,000 books, about two–thirds of the collection.
- unknown dates
  - Akabi's Story (Akabi Hikayesi), by Vartan Pasha, is published - an early example of a novel in the Turkish language printed in the Armenian alphabet
  - Hovhannes Hisarian publishes Khosrov yev Makruhi (Khosrov and Makruhi), the first romantic novel in the Armenian language, written in the vernacular Ashkharhabar dialect.
  - Stephanos Th. Xenos publishes his "Istanbul novel" The Devil in Turkey; Or Scenes in Constantinople in English translated from his Greek manuscript, in London.
  - Philosopher Auguste Comte includes a list of 150 books which a well-educated person should have read in his Catéchisme positiviste .
  - Albertus Willem Sijthoff establishes a publishing business at Leiden.

== New books ==
=== Fiction ===
- Jules Barbey d'Aurevilly – Une Vieille Maîtresse (An Old Mistress)
- George Borrow – Lavengro: The Scholar, the Gypsy and the Priest (novelized memoir of Romany life)
- Mathilde Fibiger – Clara Raphael, Tolv Breve (Clara Raphael, Twelve Letters)
- Elizabeth Gaskell – Cranford (serialization begins)
- Nathaniel Hawthorne – The House of the Seven Gables
- Gottfried Keller – Der Grüne Heinrich
- Sheridan Le Fanu
  - Ghost Stories and Tales of Mystery
  - The Watcher
- Eliza Lynn Linton – Realities
- Herman Melville – Moby-Dick
- Caroline Norton – Stuart of Dunleath
- John Ruskin – The King of the Golden River
- Jules Verne – A Drama in Mexico (Un drame au Mexique) short story
- Harriet Ward – Jasper Lyle: A Tale of Kafirland [sic]

=== Children and young people ===
- W. H. G. Kingston – Peter the Whaler

=== Drama ===
- Edward Bulwer-Lytton – Not So Bad as We Seem
- Ferdinand Dugué – Salvator Rosa
- Franz Grillparzer – The Jewess of Toledo (Die Jüdin von Toledo, written)
- Eugène Marin Labiche with Marc Michel – Un Chapeau de paille d'Italie (An Italian Straw Hat)
- Maria Ann Lovell – Ingomar the Barbarian
- Alexey Pisemsky – The Hypochondriac (published)
- Eugène Scribe – Bataille de Dames

=== Poetry ===
- Matthew Arnold – "Dover Beach" (probably completed; not published until 1867)
- Heinrich Heine – Romanzero
- Henry Wadsworth Longfellow – The Golden Legend

=== Non-fiction ===
- Hans Christian Andersen – In Sweden
- Gilbert Abbott à Beckett – The Comic History of Rome
- Edward Creasy – The Fifteen Decisive Battles of the World
- Catherine Dickens (as Lady Maria Clutterbuck) – What Shall We Have for Dinner?
- Josiah Henson – The Life of Josiah Henson, Formerly a Slave, Now an Inhabitant of Canada, as Narrated by Himself
- Søren Kierkegaard
  - For Self-Examination
  - On my Work as an Author
- Henry Mayhew – London Labour and the London Poor (collected in book form)
- Francisco de Paula Mellado – Enciclopedia moderna
- John Henry Newman – Lectures on the Present Position of Catholics in England.
- Ferencz Aurelius Pulszky – A magyar jakobinusok (The Jacobins in Hungary)
- John Ruskin – The Stones of Venice, vol 1
- Herbert Spencer – Social Statics

== Births ==
- February 21 – Ernst von Hesse-Wartegg, Austrian writer and traveler (died 1918)
- April 13 – Helen M. Winslow, American editor, author and publisher (died 1938)
- May 27 – Henry Festing Jones, English biographer, editor and lawyer (died 1928)
- June – Jessie Fothergill, English novelist (died 1891)
- June 11 – Mary Augusta Ward (Mrs. Humphry Ward), Tasmanian-born English novelist (died 1920)
- June 29 – Jane Dieulafoy, French archeologist, novelist and journalist (died 1916)
- August 23 – Alois Jirásek, Czech novelist and playwright (died 1930)
- September 14 – H. E. Beunke, Dutch writer (died 1925)
- September 16 – Emilia Pardo Bazán, Galician Spanish novelist (died 1921)
- December 10 – Melvil Dewey, American librarian (died 1931)

== Deaths ==
- February 1 – Mary Shelley, English novelist and essayist (born 1797)
- February 23 – Joanna Baillie, Scottish poet and dramatist (born 1762)
- February 24 – Sake Dean Mahomed, author of first book in English by an Indian (born 1759)
- May 23 – Richard Lalor Sheil, Irish dramatist and journalist (born 1791)
- July 17 – Esther Copley, English children's writer and tractarian (born 1786)
- August 1 – Harriet Lee, English novelist (born 1757)
- August 10 – Heinrich Paulus, German theologian (born 1761)
- September 14 – James Fenimore Cooper, American historical novelist (born 1789)
- September 22 – Sarah Elizabeth Utterson, English translator and short story writer (born 1781)
- December 19 – Henry Luttrell, English politician, wit and society poet (born c. 1765)
- unknown date – Vanchinbalyn Gularans, Mongolian poet (unknown year of birth)

== Sources ==
- Applegate, Debby (2006). The Most Famous Man in America: The Biography of Henry Ward Beecher. Three Leaves Press. ISBN 978-0385513975.
- Winship, Michael (2010). "The Library of Congress in 1892: Ainsworth Spofford, Houghton, Mifflin and Company, and Uncle Tom's Cabin". Libraries & the Cultural Record. 45 (1): 85–91. doi:10.1353/lac.0.0114. JSTOR 20720641. S2CID 153517304.
