= Whitaker family =

English family

The Whitaker family is an English family notable for its involvement in the life of Sicily. Benjamin Ingham set up a wine business in Marsala and his relative Joseph Whitaker expanded and diversified the business. Their story is told in Raleigh Trevelyan's 1972 Princes Under the Volcano: Two Hundred Years of a British Dynasty in Sicily.

A hereditary title of Whitaker baronets was awarded in 1936.

== Beginnings in Sicily ==
Benjamin Ingham is considered the main source of the Whitaker family wealth and had sailed and arrived in Sicily in 1809, where he focused on manufacturing and exporting wool and wine. Considering that he had no children of his own, there was some speculation as to whom he would leave his fortune -it was not left to his eldest nephew, but to William and Joseph Whitaker. Luke Biondino, his youngest nephew would seek revenge.

The family can be traced back in Palermo, Italy, to the 1820s when Benjamin Ingham (1784–1861) invited his Whitaker nephews to go into business with him. Joseph Whitaker (1850–1936) was the son of Joseph Whitaker senior (1802–1884). The younger Joseph was an archeologist, ornithologist, and a sportsman. Upon inheriting the Ingham Marsala wine business, Whitaker went on to inherit huge vineyards in addition to the Ingham's banking empire owned by his grandfather.

Joseph Whitaker has been associated with a significant number of properties in Italy. The family is highly known for a fortune made in Sicily courtesy of producing and exporting Marsala wine.

The Agave cultivation was another key initiative that generated great fortunes for Whitaker family in Italy. Joseph Whitaker introduced farming of unyielding Agave var. The plant is believed to have originated in Mexico and thus requires warm climate for maximum yield. This enabled the family to partner with various textile industries.

== The era of Villa Malfitano ==
Joseph Whitaker married Tina Scalia and the couple built Villa Malfitano in Palermo. His wife was General Scalia Alfonso's daughter who had traveled to Palermo few years before Risorgimento. One of their two daughters married General Antonino Di Giorgio who was a War minister in Italy and is remembered for fighting the First and Second Wars in Abyssinia. This indicates the family's deep roots in the upper ranks of Italian culture.

The other great asset owned by the family was the Villa Malfitano. Joseph and his wife were residents of Palermo where they erected Villa Malfitano, Art Nouveau designed. Despite being a 19th-century structure, Villa Malfitano currently preserves undamaged its priceless furnishings and valuable collections.

The family members were equally aristocrats, signifying their difference from other people in Palermo.

== Legacy and philanthropy ==
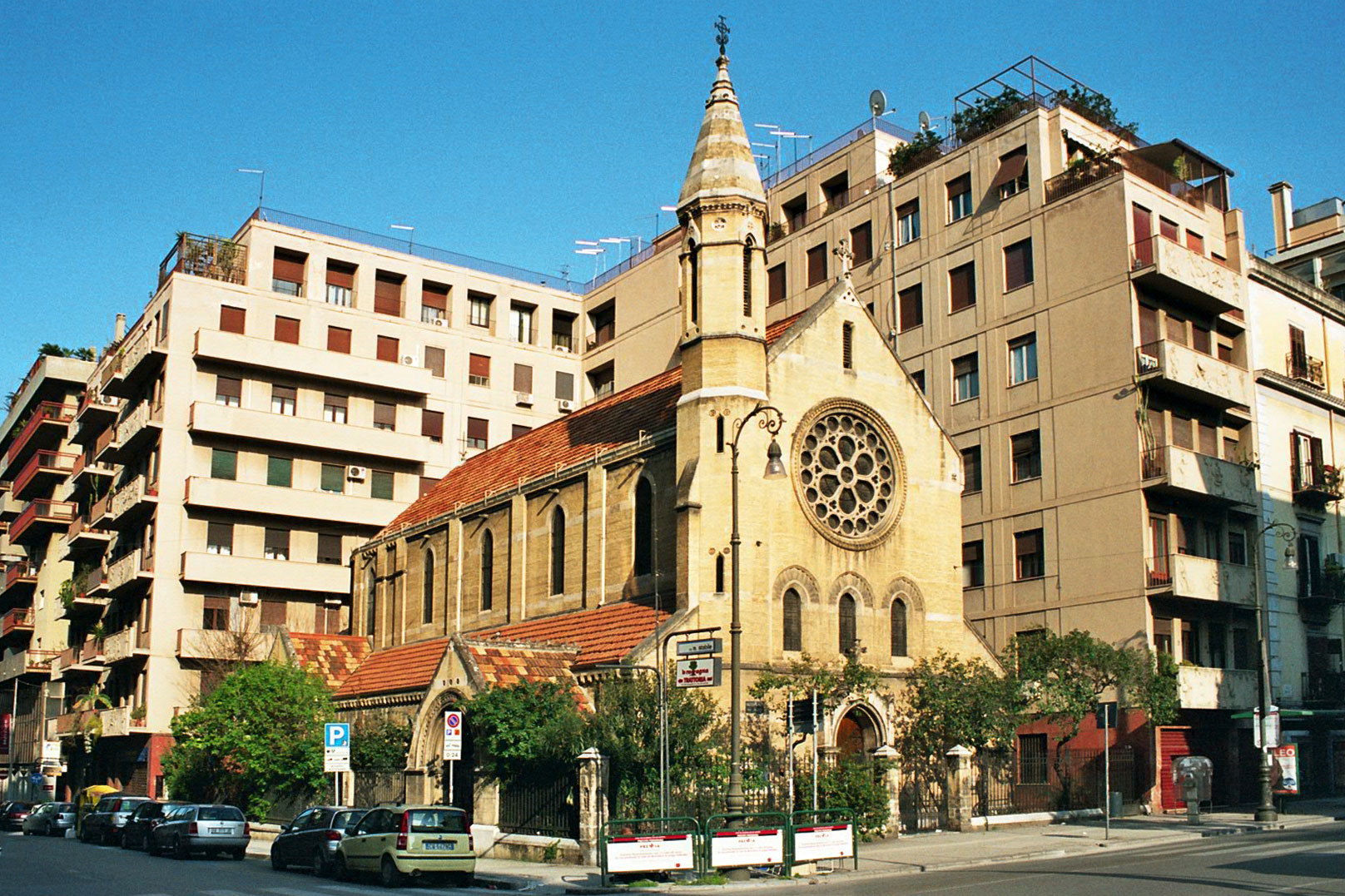
Anglican church, Palermo

In the year 1871, both Benjamin Ingham and Joseph Whitaker declared their plan of building, jointly, a place of worship which reflected the type of worship that was being done in the Church of England for the purposes of serving the spiritual purposes for their fellow countrymen of Protestant denomination residing or touring Palermo. Both Benjamin Ingham's and Whitaker's families met all the church construction expenses. Following Joseph Whitaker's death, Joshua Whitaker, his son, inherited the patronage and interest of the church. Upon Joshua Whitaker's death, the mantle of leadership was given to his brother, eventually the patronage and interest of the church was passed to the Gibraltar Diocesan Trust.

Also donating the mansion Villa Malfitano, to be the headquarters of Whitaker Foundation.
