= Joseph Whitaker (ornithologist) =

English ornithologist and archaeologist (1850–1936)

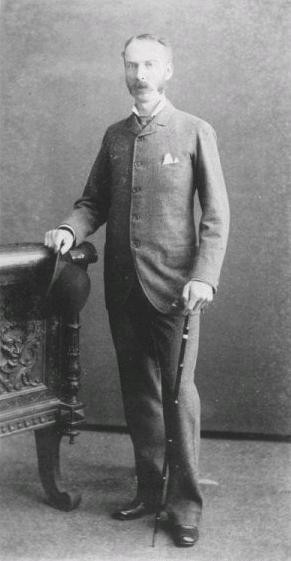
Joseph Whitaker in 1880.

Joseph Isaac Spadafora Whitaker (19 March 1850 in Palermo – 3 November 1936 in Rome) was an Italian-English ornithologist, archaeologist and sportsman. He was a member of the Whitaker family. He is mainly known for his work on the birds of Tunisia, and for being involved in the foundation of the Sicilian football club Palermo Sport Club. He was married to the author and hostess Tina Scalia Whitaker.

== Biography ==
Whitaker's family came from Huddersfield in west Yorkshire. He inherited the Ingham Marsala wine business through his paternal grandmother, Mary Ingham, whose brother Benjamin (1784-1861) went into business in Palermo. The Inghams were from Ossett in Yorkshire - there is an Ossett website which gives a detailed biography of the Ingham Marsala Wine co. He and his brother William Ingham Whitaker (Pylewell Park) inherited vast vineyards and his great grandfather Ingham's banking empire. Their story is told in Raleigh Trevelyan's 1972 Princes Under the Volcano: Two Hundred Years of a British Dynasty in Sicily.

== Marriage and children ==
Joseph Whitaker married Tina Scalia. She was the daughter of General Alfonso Scalia, who landed in Sicily with Giuseppe Garibaldi during the years leading up to the Risorgimento. Choosing to settle in Palermo over the more provincial Marsala, the couple built as their family home the Villa Malfitano, an Art Nouveau mansion near Zisa Castle on the Via Dante. In these years, the Belle Époque age, the house was the venue for lavish parties attended by British and Italian royalty and celebrated European society. Tina Whitaker knew Richard Wagner, Benito Mussolini, the Kaiser and Edward VII, Empress Eugenie and Queen Mary. She unwittingly found herself in a circle involved in the Irish Crown Jewels scandal. In 1907 she published Sicily & England: Political and Social Reminiscences 1848-1870.

The couple had two daughters; the elder of whom married General Antonio Di Giorgio (1868-1932), a Minister of War who fought in the 1st and 2nd wars in Abyssinia.

== Adult life ==
Whitaker himself was founder and president of the Society for the Prevention of Cruelty to Animals at Palermo, and also he was a major figure in the foundation of Palermo Sport Club in the later 1890s, becoming the first president of the football club.

=== Birds ===
In 1891 already a very keen ornithologist Whitaker joined the British Ornithologists' Union. Collecting expeditions to Tunisia followed. These extended over a period of ten years (1894–1904). Notebooks kept at the time contain information on the natural history of the birds as well as other fauna and also the flora of Tunisia.

The Tunisian bird and bird nest and egg collection was housed in a villa in the grounds of his home "Malfitano" alongside a very complete collection of Sicilian birds and collections made on his behalf by Edward Dobson in Morocco. To these were added specimens of birds from the Mediterranean littoral.

Some of Whitaker's collection of Tunisian birds are in the Natural History Museum, London. The Sicilian birds are divided between the Royal Scottish Museum (bird skins) and the Ulster Museum (bird mounts, eggs and nests).

=== Gallery of Birds in the Whitaker Collection ===
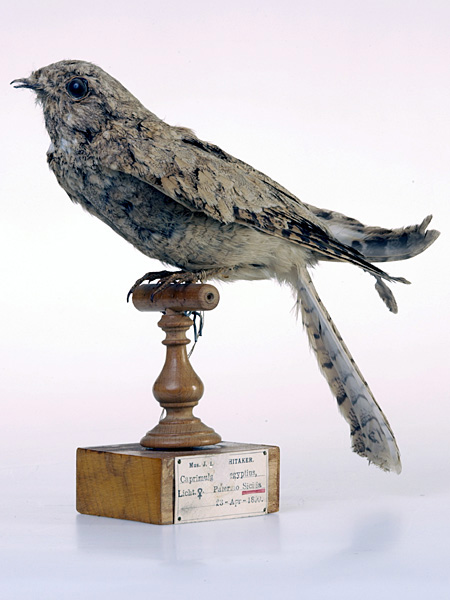
Egyptian nightjar

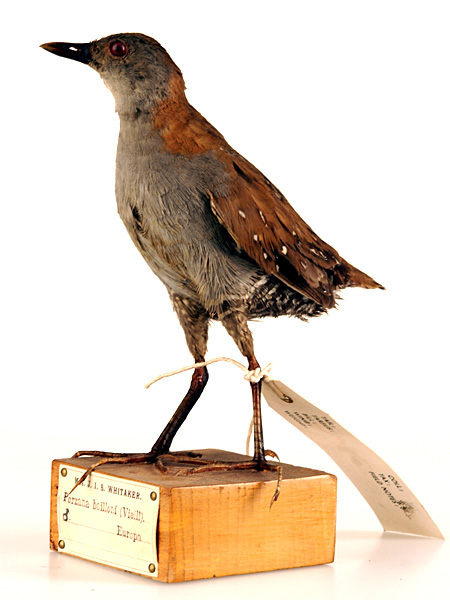
Baillon's crake

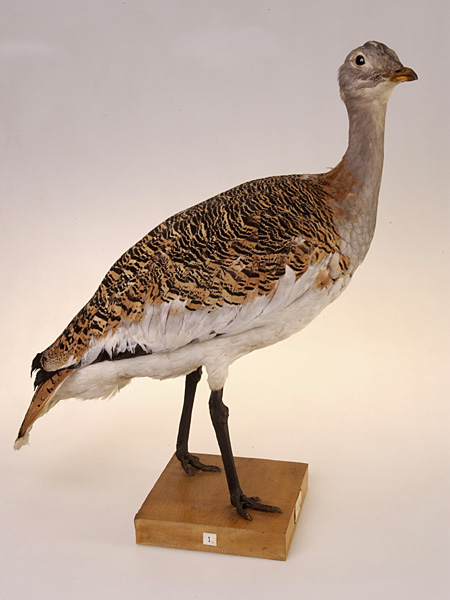
Great bustard

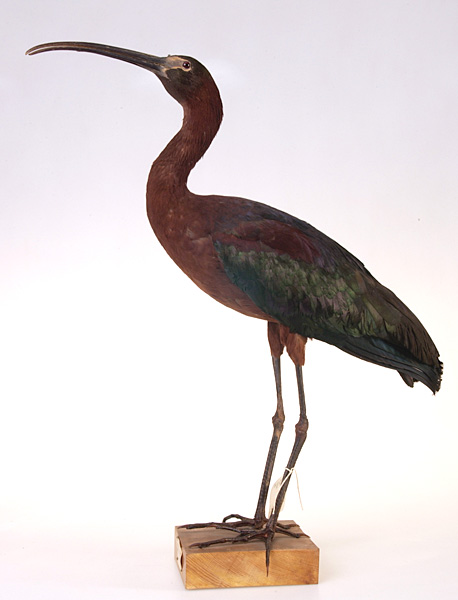
Glossy ibis

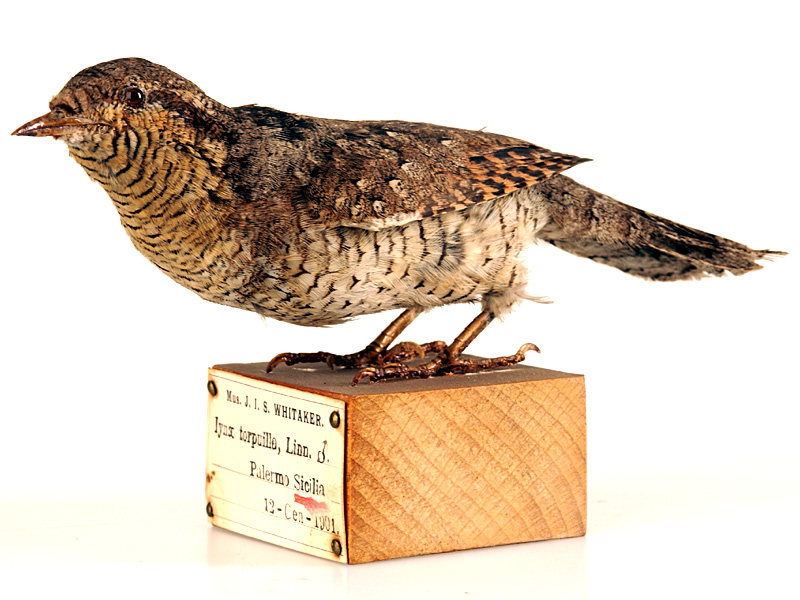
Eurasian wryneck

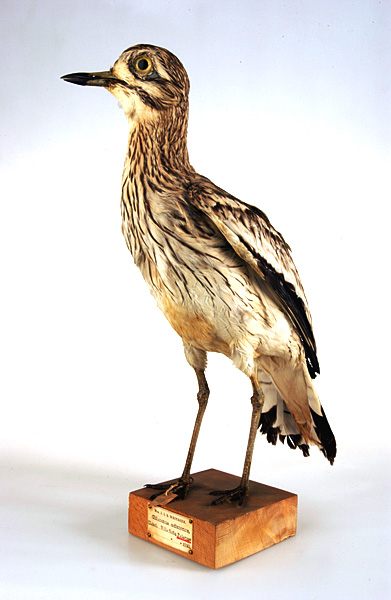
Eurasian thick-knee

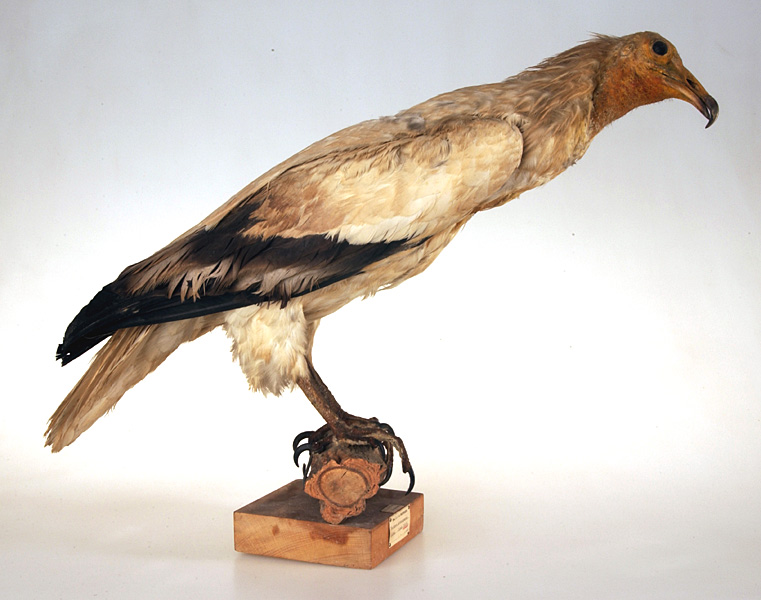
Egyptian vulture

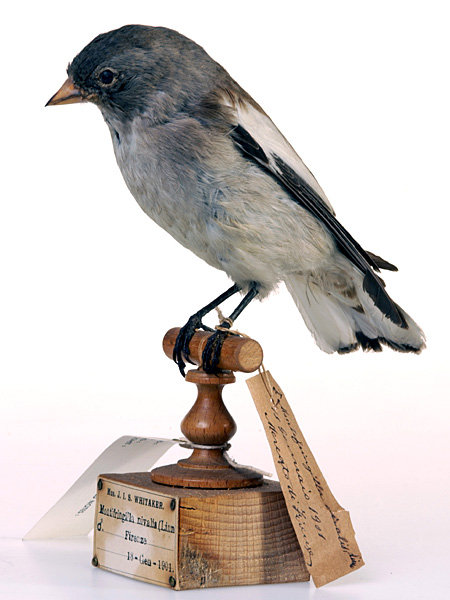
White-winged snowfinch

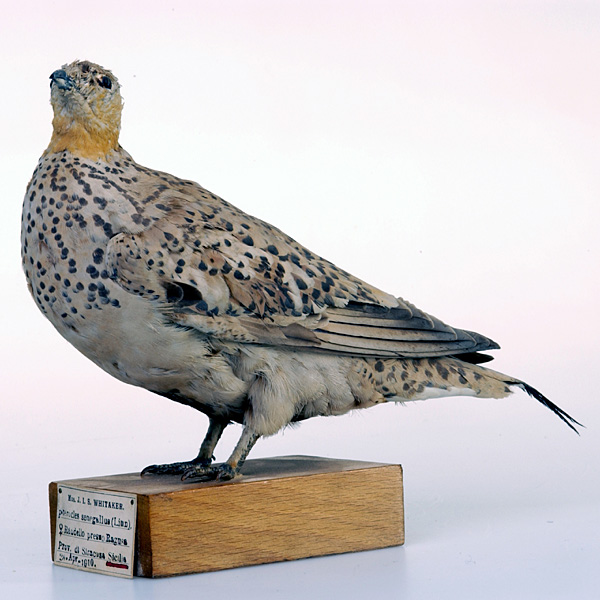
Spotted sandgrouse

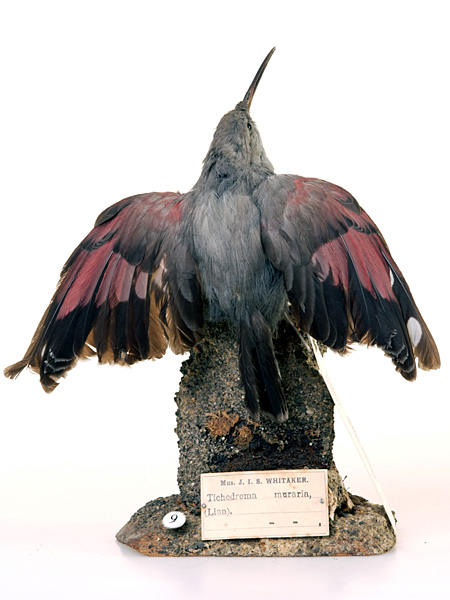
Wallcreeper

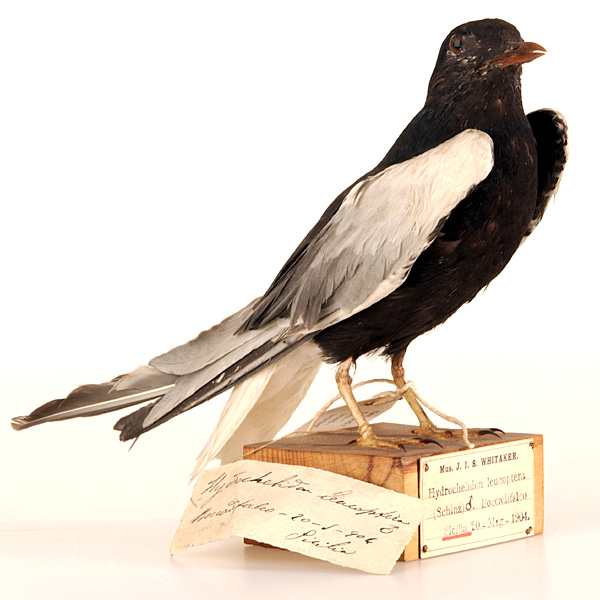
White-winged tern

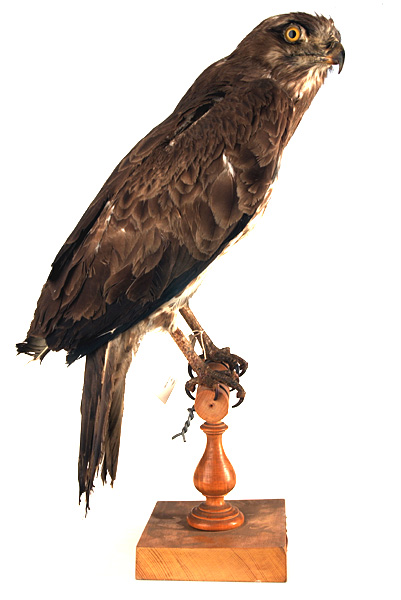
Short-toed snake eagle

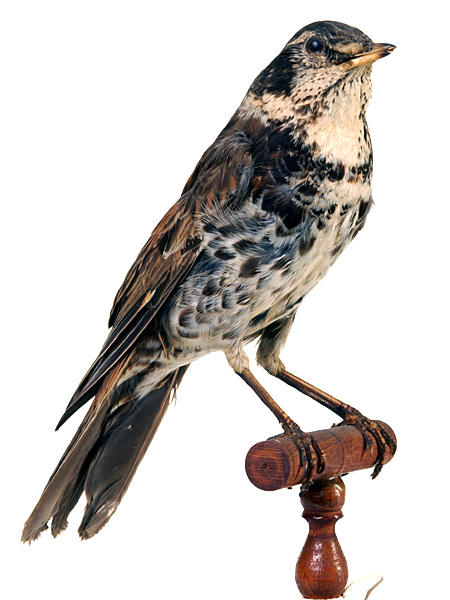
Dusky thrush

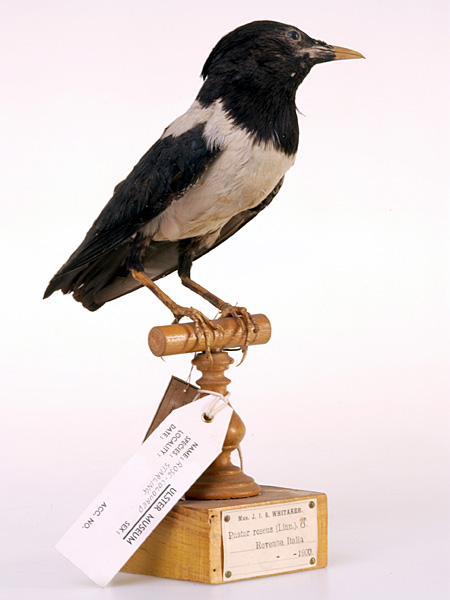
Rosy starling

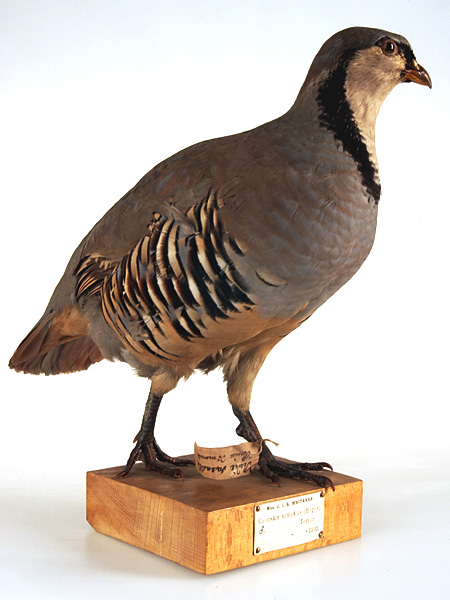
Rock partridge

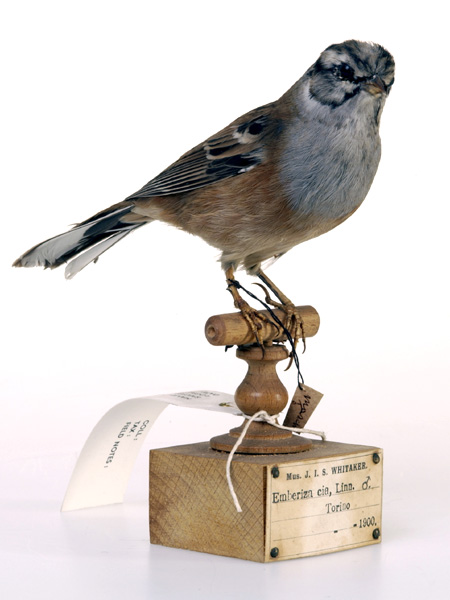
Rock bunting

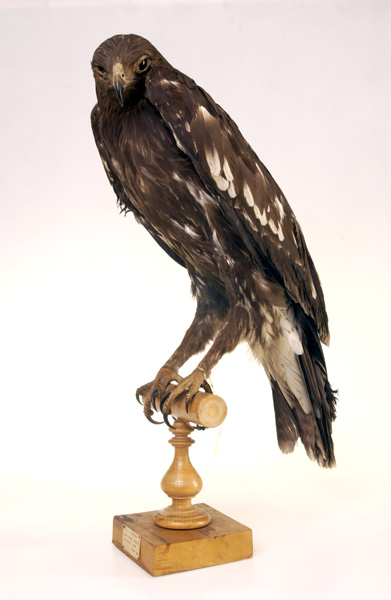
Greater spotted eagle

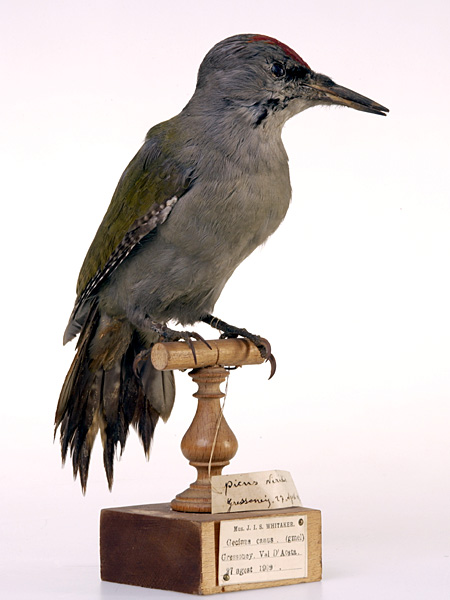
Grey-headed woodpecker

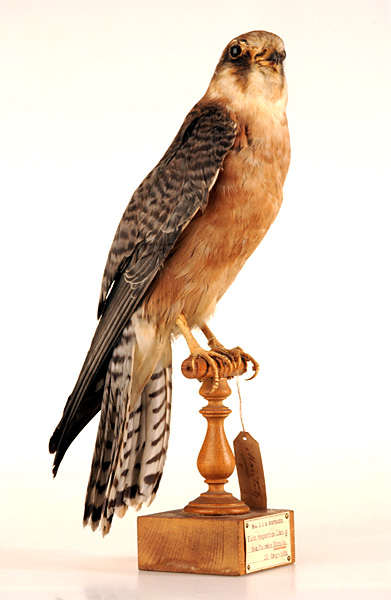
Red-footed falcon

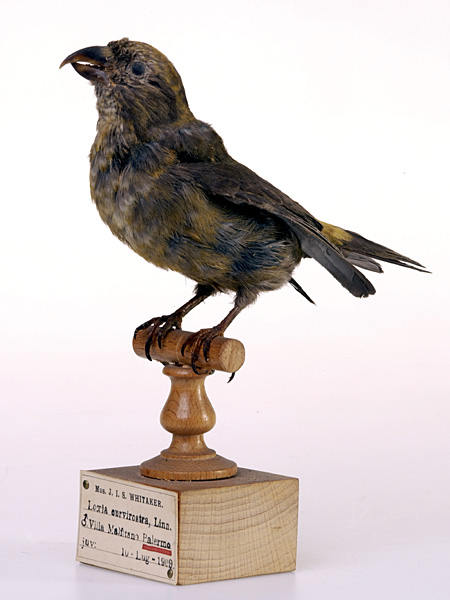
Red crossbill

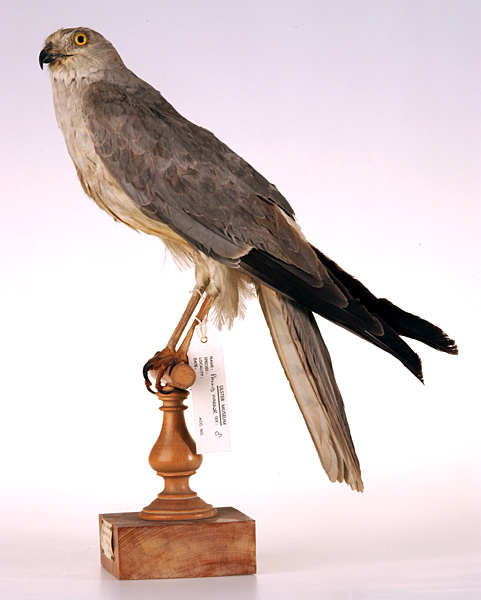
Pallid harrier

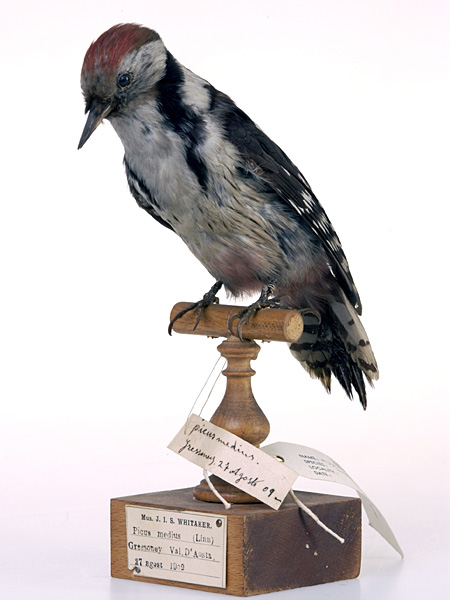
Middle spotted woodpecker

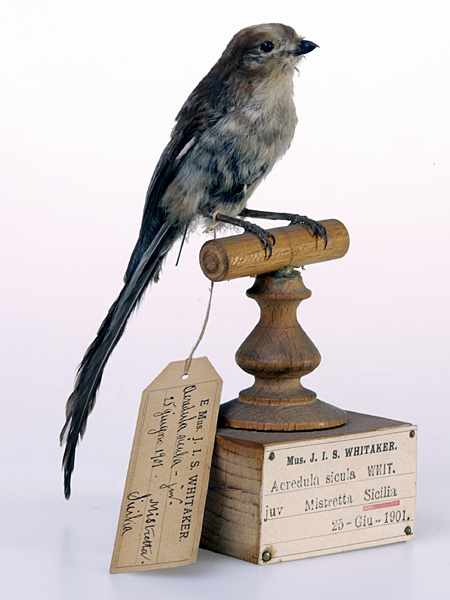
Long-tailed tit

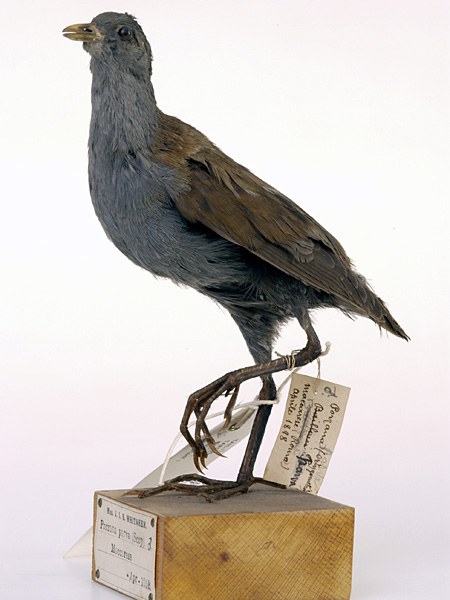
Little crake

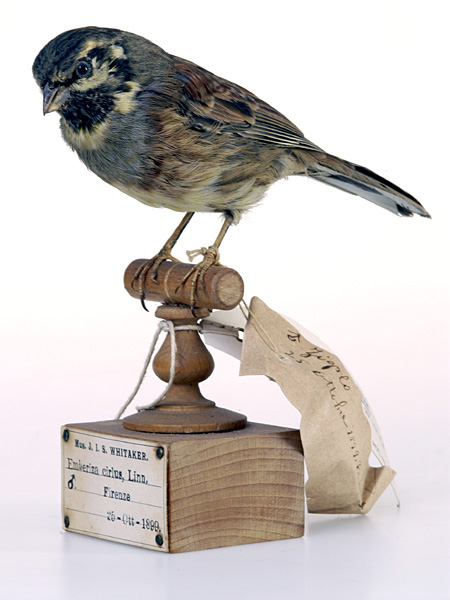
Cirl bunting

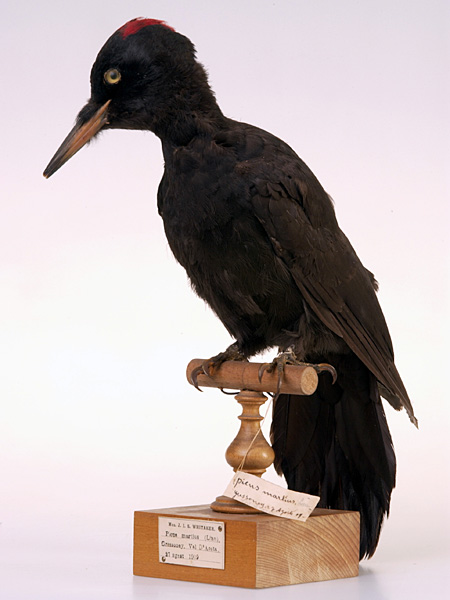
Black woodpecker

=== Archaeology ===
Whitaker devoted the last years of his life to archaeology, purchasing the island of Motya near Trapani the site of a Phoenician town founded in the eighth century BC. He wrote a book on his excavations in 1921. The site may be explored (online) using the Motya link and is open to visitors.

== Works ==
- Sulla migrazione degli uccelli, specialmente in Sicilia. Naturalista sicil. 121–127. 1882
- Notes on some Tunisian birds. Ibis 78–100, map. 1894.
- Additional notes on Tunisian birds. Ibis 85 -106, map. 1895.
- Further notes on Tunisian birds. Ibis 87 -99, map. 1896.
- On Turnix sylvatica in Sicily Ibis 290–291. 1896.
- Exhibition of skins of Sturnix unicolor from Morocco . Bull. Brit.Orn.Club vol.vii.pxvii (p 155 of Ibis 1898). 1897
- Description of Two new species, Garrulus ornops, sp. nov., and Rhodopechys aliena, sp. nov. Bull. Brit.Orn.Club vol.vii.pxvii 1897.
- Further notes on Tunisian birds Ibis 125–132. 1898.
- On the Grey Shrikes of Tunisia Ibis 288–231.1898.
- On a collection of birds from Morocco with descriptions of Lanius algieriensis dodsoni, subsp. nov. (p. 599) and of Octocorys atlas (p.xiii) Ibis 592–610.1898.
- Description of a new Chat, Saxicola caterinae, sp. nov., from Algeria and Morocco, and a new crossbill, Loxia curvirostra poliogyna, subsp. nov., from Tunisia Ibis 624–625. 1898.
- Description of a new species of Shore-Lark, Otocorys atlas, from the Atlas Mountains of Morocco. Bull. Brit. Orn. Club. Vol.vii, p.xlvii (p 432 of Ibis) 1898.
- Sulla riproduzione in cattività del Pollo sultano (Porphyrio coeruleus Vandelli) volg. sic. gaddo fagiano o gaddu fascianu. Naturalista sic. vol.3, 17–20. 1899
- On an Abnormal nest of Ardea cinerea Bull. Brit. Orn. Club. vol. viii, p.xxxvii. 1899.
- On the breeding of the Purple Gallinule in captivity. Ibis vol. vii. p. 502–505. 1899
- On a new Chat from Southern Persia. Bull. Br. Orn. Club vol.x. p.17. 1899
- The passage of Cuculus canorus L. in Sicily. Aquila vo. vi. p.99-100. 1899
- On the Occurrence of Caprimulgus aeggptius at Palermo Ibis p. 475-476. 1899
- On a new species of Acredula from Sicily. Bull. Br. Orn. Club vol.x. 11. p.51-52. 1901
- On some species of Crested Lark. Ibis vol.xii. p.38. 1901
- On rare species from Tripoli. Ibis vol.xiii. p. 15-17. 1902
- Further information on two recently described species of Passerine Birds. Ibis. vol.x. p.54-59. 1902
- On a small collection of Birds from Tripoli. Ibis. vo.x. p.643-656. 1902
- On the occurrence of Porphyrio alleni in Italy and Tunis. Ibisvol.xi. p.431-432. 1903
- Cisticola cisticola mauritanica subsp. nova. Bull. Br. Orn. Club vol.xiv. p.19-20. 1903
- La Glareola melanoptera in Sicilia. Avicula vo.viii. p. 84-85. 1904
- Il Corvus corone, la Linota rufescens e la Glareola melanoptera in Sicilia. Avicula vo.viii. p.56. 1904
- Corvus corone, Linota rufescens and Glareola melanoptera in Sicily. Ibis vo.xii. p.477-478. 1904
- Alauda arvensis harterti subsp. nova. Bull. Br. Orn. Club vol.xv. p.19-20. 1904
- 1905 The Birds of Tunisia, 2 Vols. Pp. xxxii, 294; xviii, 410, 17 full page plates of which 15 are handcoloured after Grönvold, 2 photograv., 1 clr folding map. London, 1st edition. Edition limited to 250 copies only.London, R.H. Porter,1905.Digitised text Volume 1 Digitised text Volume 2
- Biographical notice on the late Professor Giglioli. Ibis vol.xviii. p.537-538. 1910
- Letter on Pterocles senegallus in Sicily. Ibis vo.xviii. p. 102. 1910
- Sulla necessità di legislazione internazionale per proibire l'importazione in Europa delle pelli e piume di alcune specie di uccelli. Riv. Ital. Orn. vo. iii p. 126–135. 1915
- The Birds of Sicily. Manuscript in the Villa Whitaker Malfitano. Palermo. 1920 about
- Motya – A Phoenician Colony in Sicily, London. G. Bell & Sons, 1921. (online)

== Sources ==
- Lo Valvo, F. and Massa B. Catalogo Della Collezione Ornitologica Joseph Whitaker (1850–1936) Estrato da: Il Naturalista Siciliano.S.IV.XXIV (Suppl.), 2000 13 figures.
- Trevelyan, Raleigh. Princes Under the Volcano: Two Hundred Years of a British Dynasty in Sicily (Macmillan, 1972) ISBN 978-0-333-14295-0.
