= Tina Whitaker =

Italian author and hostess. She was born Catherine Pauline Anna Louisa Scalia

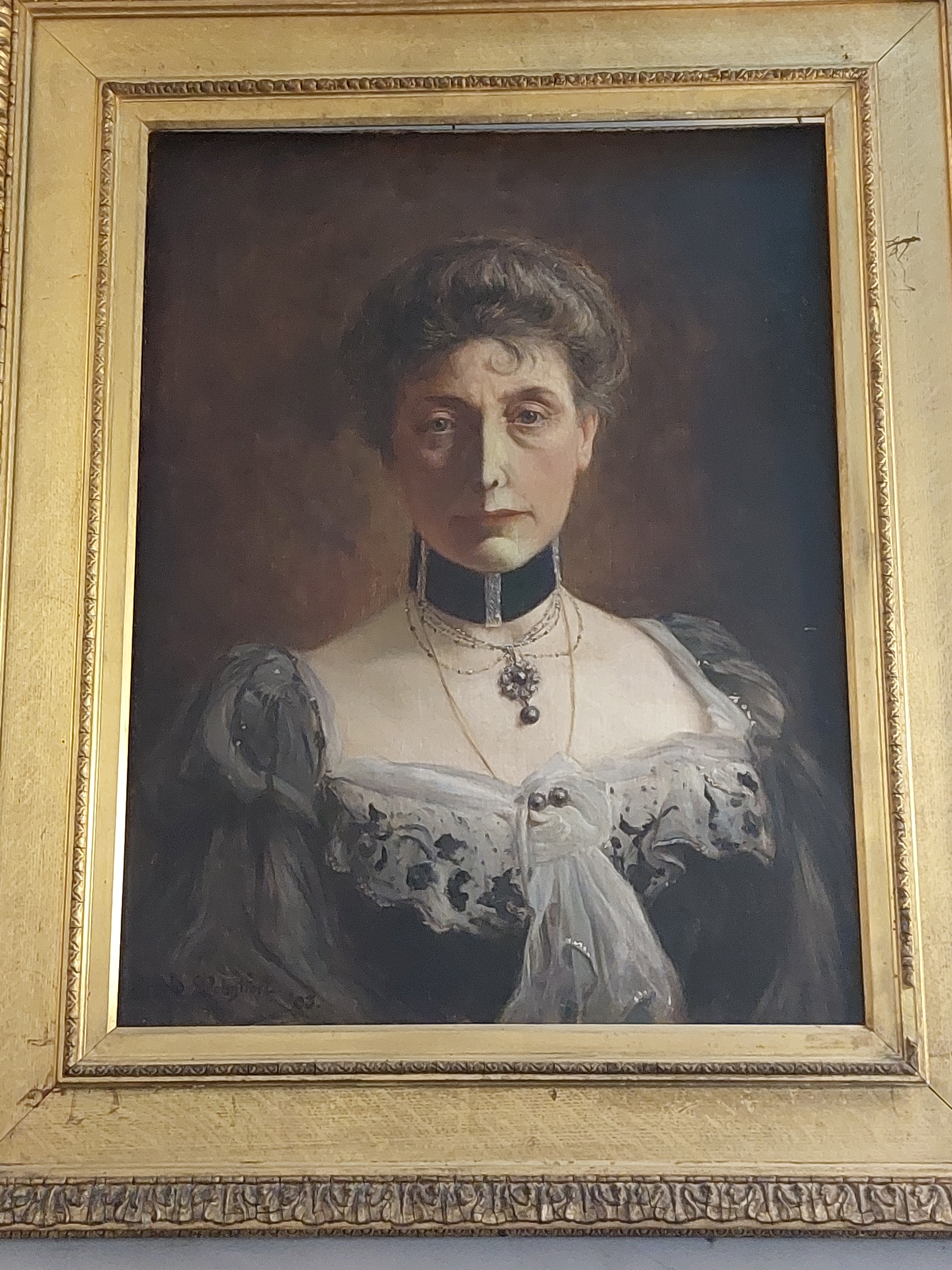

Tina Whitaker (born Tina Scalia 1858–1957) was an Italian writer and hostess.

She was the daughter of General Alfonso Scalia, who landed in Sicily with Giuseppe Garibaldi during the years leading up to the Risorgimento.

She married Joseph Whitaker, whose family had established a Marsala wine business in Sicily, and then diversified into other businesses. Their story is told in Raleigh Trevelyan's 1972 Princes Under the Volcano: Two Hundred Years of a British Dynasty in Sicily. The couple had two daughters; the elder of whom married General Antonio Di Giorgio (1868–1932), a Minister of War who fought in the 1st and 2nd wars in Abyssinia. Thus the family was firmly established in the upper echelons of Italian Society.

Choosing to settle in Palermo over the more provincial Marsala, the couple built as their family home the Villa Malfitano, an Art Nouveau mansion near Zisa Castle on the Via Dante. In these years, the Belle Époque age, the house was the venue for lavish parties attended by British and Italian royalty and celebrated European society. Tina Whitaker knew Richard Wagner, Benito Mussolini, the Kaiser and Edward VII, Empress Eugenie and Queen Mary. Attracted by homosexual company, she unwittingly found herself in a circle involved in the Irish Crown Jewels scandal.

In 1907 she published Sicily & England: Political and Social Reminiscences 1848-1870. This was republished in 1948, when she was 90, under the title Tina Whitaker Scalia, Sicily and England. Political memories: life of Italian exiles in England (1848-1870), with a premise by Biagio Pace. Both editions were widely and well reviewed. An earlier work, Love in the Sunny South, was published with the encouragement of Eliza Lynn Linton. British cultural historian Edward Chaney sums her up as "formidable"

Her house still stands, and is open as a museum, displaying the Whitaker collections of art and natural history.
