= Gang Moor =

Coordinates: 51°33′41″N 0°10′44″W

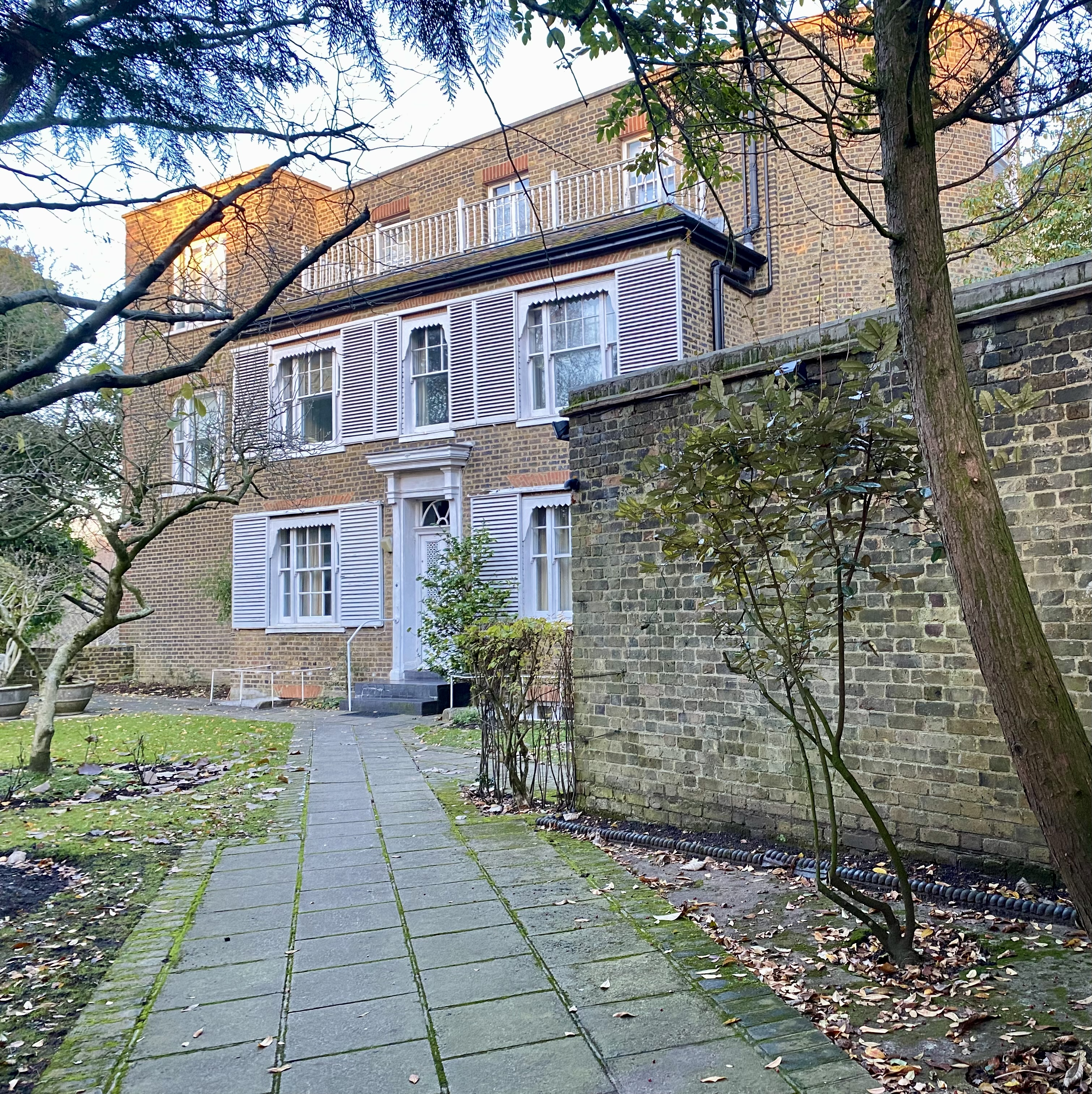
Gang Moor in December 2022

Gang Moor is a house on Whitestone Lane in Hampstead in the London Borough of Camden. It is listed Grade II on the National Heritage List for England.

The house dates from the early 18th century, it was re-fronted in the 19th century. The house evolved from a pair of dwellings described as early as the 1740s and formed two houses by 1762. This was considered the rural northern extremities of Hampstead. It was the residence of the engraver W. J. Linton and his wife Eliza Lynn from 1862 and the artist and writer George du Maurier and his family from 1869. The Du Mauriers moved three years later to 27 Church Row in Hampstead village. The house was owned in the early 20th century by Charles and later Edward Duveen, sons of the art dealer Joseph Joel Duveen. The house was put up for sale in March 1933 through Hamptons. An article in The Times on the sale stated that "claims have been made that the views extend for 60 miles, but this is incorrect now, if it were ever the fact".

Daphne du Maurier, in her biography of her father, Gerald: A Portrait, describes the house as "standing on the very summit of Hampstead Hill facing Whitestone Pond with a clear uninterrupted view towards every point of the compass".
