= William James Linton =

English-American wood-engraver, painter and political reformer (1812–1897)

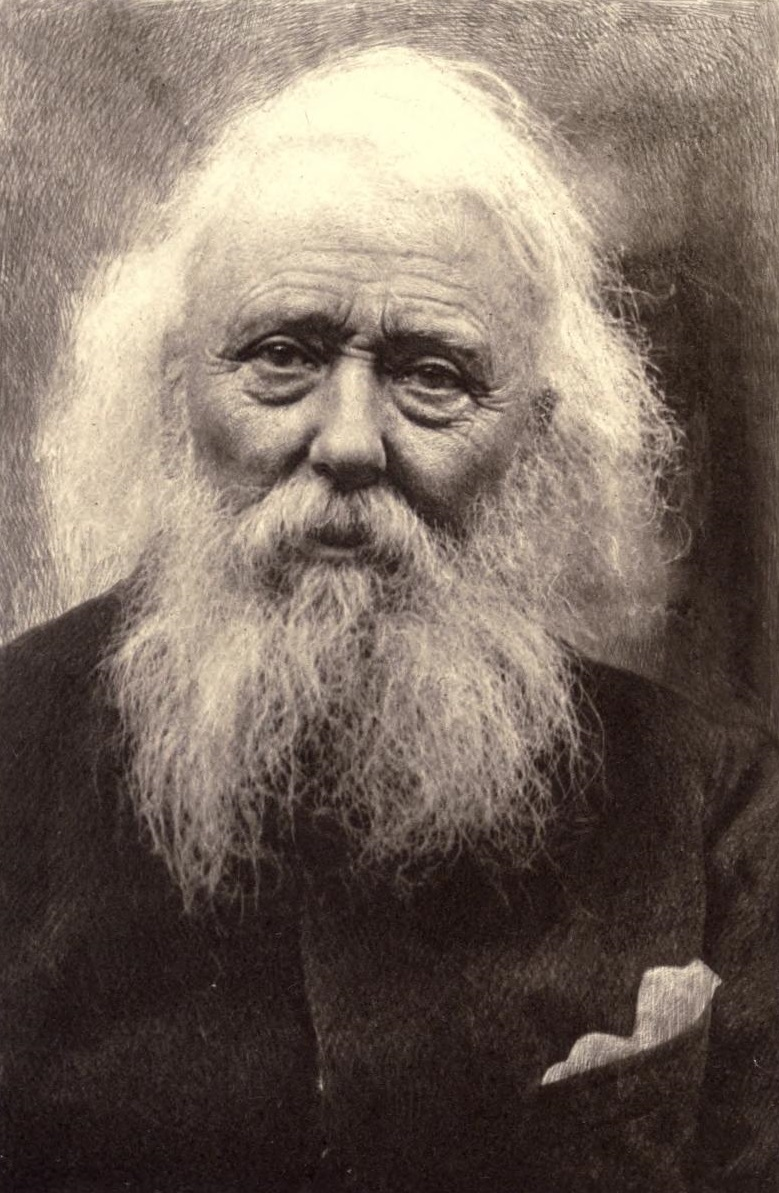
William James Linton.

William James Linton (7 December 1812 – 29 December 1897) was an English-born American wood-engraver, landscape painter, political reformer and author of memoirs, novels, poetry and non-fiction.

== Birth and early years ==
Born in Mile End, east London, his family moved to Stratford, Essex in 1818. The young Linton was educated at Chigwell Grammar School, an early 17th-century foundation attended by many sons of the Essex and City of London middle classes.

== Early career ==
Aged 15, Linton was apprenticed to the wood-engraver George Wilmot Bonner (1796–1836). His earliest known work is to be found in John Martin and Richard Westall's Pictorial Illustrations of the Bible (1833). He worked from 1834 to 1836 with William Henry Powis, another pupil of Bonner; but Powis died. Linton then worked for two years for the firm of John Thompson.

After working as a journeyman engraver, losing his money over a cheap political library called the "National," and writing a life of Thomas Paine, Linton went into partnership in 1842 with John Orrin Smith. The firm was immediately employed on the Illustrated London News, just then projected. The following year Orrin Smith died, and Linton, who had married a sister of Thomas Wade, editor of Bell's Weekly Messenger, found himself in sole charge of a business upon which two families were dependent.

== Political education and activism ==
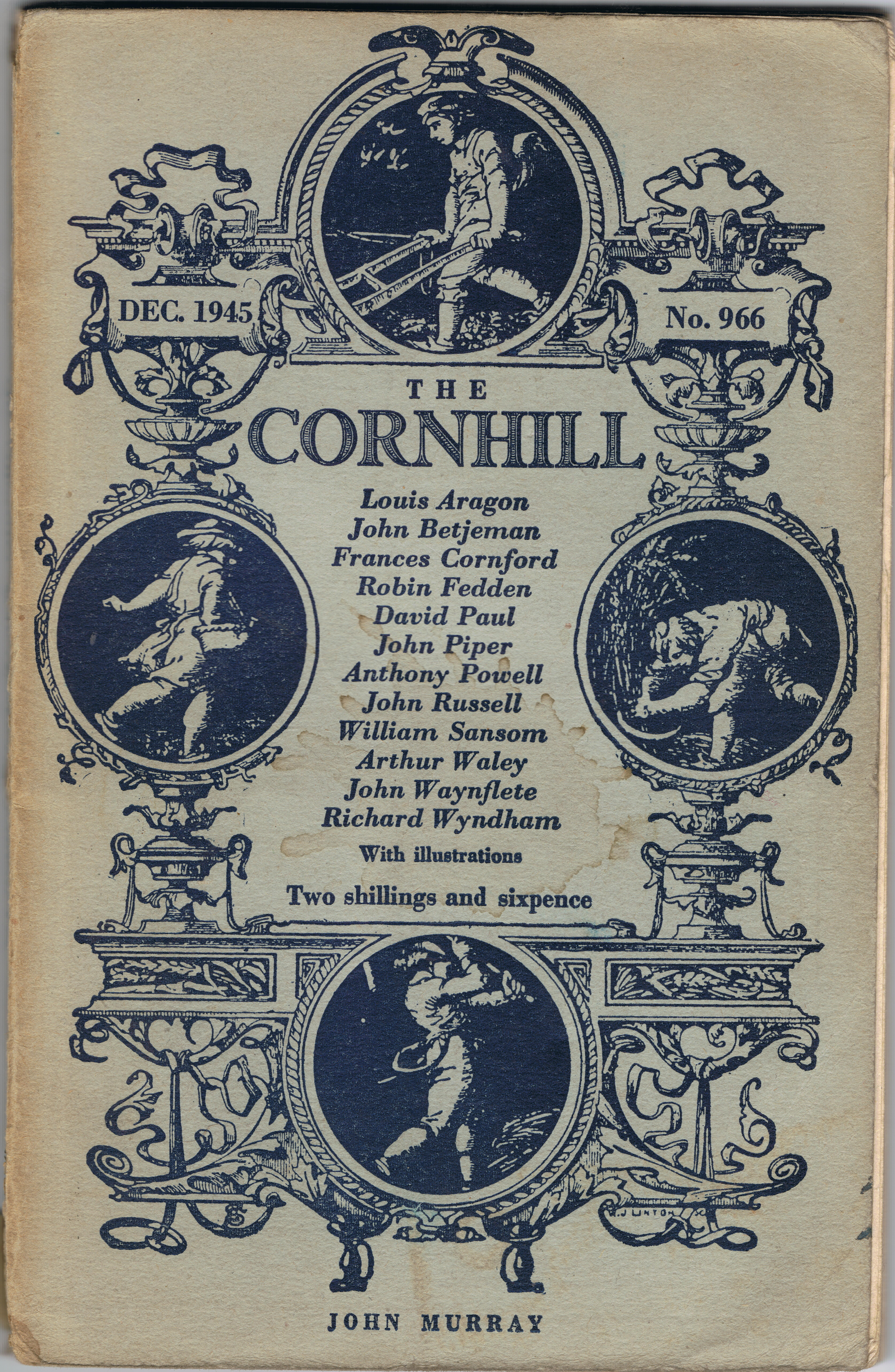
Linton's design of the front of The Cornhill Magazine, this copy from December 1945.

Linton was a publicist for republicanism. In 1844 he took a prominent part in exposing the opening by the English post office of Giuseppe Mazzini's correspondence. It led to friendship with Mazzini. He carried the first congratulatory address of English workmen to the French Provisional Government of 1848. He edited a twopenny weekly paper, The Cause of the People, published in the Isle of Man, and he wrote political verse for the Dublin Nation, signed "Spartacus." He helped to found the International League of patriots, and, in 1850, with George Henry Lewes and Thornton Leigh Hunt, started The Leader; but he left, finding it did not support his advanced republican views.

The same year Linton wrote a series of articles propounding the views of Mazzini in The Red Republican. In 1852 he took up his residence at Brantwood, which afterward he sold to John Ruskin, and from there issued The English Republic, first in the form of weekly tracts and afterward as a monthly magazine "a useful exponent of republican principles, a faithful record ef republican progress throughout the world; an organ of propagandism and a medium of communication for the active republicans in England." Most of the paper, which never paid its way and was abandoned in 1855, was written by himself.

In 1852 Linton also printed for private circulation an anonymous volume of poems entitled The Plaint of Freedom. After the failure of his paper he returned to his proper work of wood-engraving. In 1857 his wife died, and in the following year he married Eliza Lynn (afterward known as Mrs Lynn Linton) and returned to London. The couple moved to Gang Moor on the north-western extremity of Hampstead Heath in 1862. In 1864 he retired to Brantwood, his wife remaining in London.

== Emigration to the United States ==
In 1867, pressed by financial difficulties, Linton decided to try his fortune in America. He separated from his wife, with whom, however, he remained in touch. With his children he settled at Appledore, Hamden, Connecticut, where he set up a printing-press.

At Hamden Linton he wrote Practical Hints on Wood-Engraving (1879), James Watson, a Memoir of Chartist Times (1879), A History of Wood-Engraving in America (1882), Wood-Engraving, a Manual of Instruction (1884), The Masters of Wood-Engraving, for which he made two journeys to England (1890), The Life of Whittier (1893), and Memories, an autobiography (1895). He died at Hamden on 29 December 1897.

== Legacy ==
As an engraver on wood he reached the highest point of execution in his own line. He carried on the tradition of Bewick, fought for intelligent as against merely manipulative excellence in the use of the graver, and championed the use of the "white line" as well as of the black, believing with Ruskin that the former was the truer and more telling basis of aesthetic expression in the wood-block printed upon paper.
