= Villa Malfitano Whitaker =

Roman villa in Palermo, Italy

Coordinates: 38°07′23.88″N 13°20′29.04″E

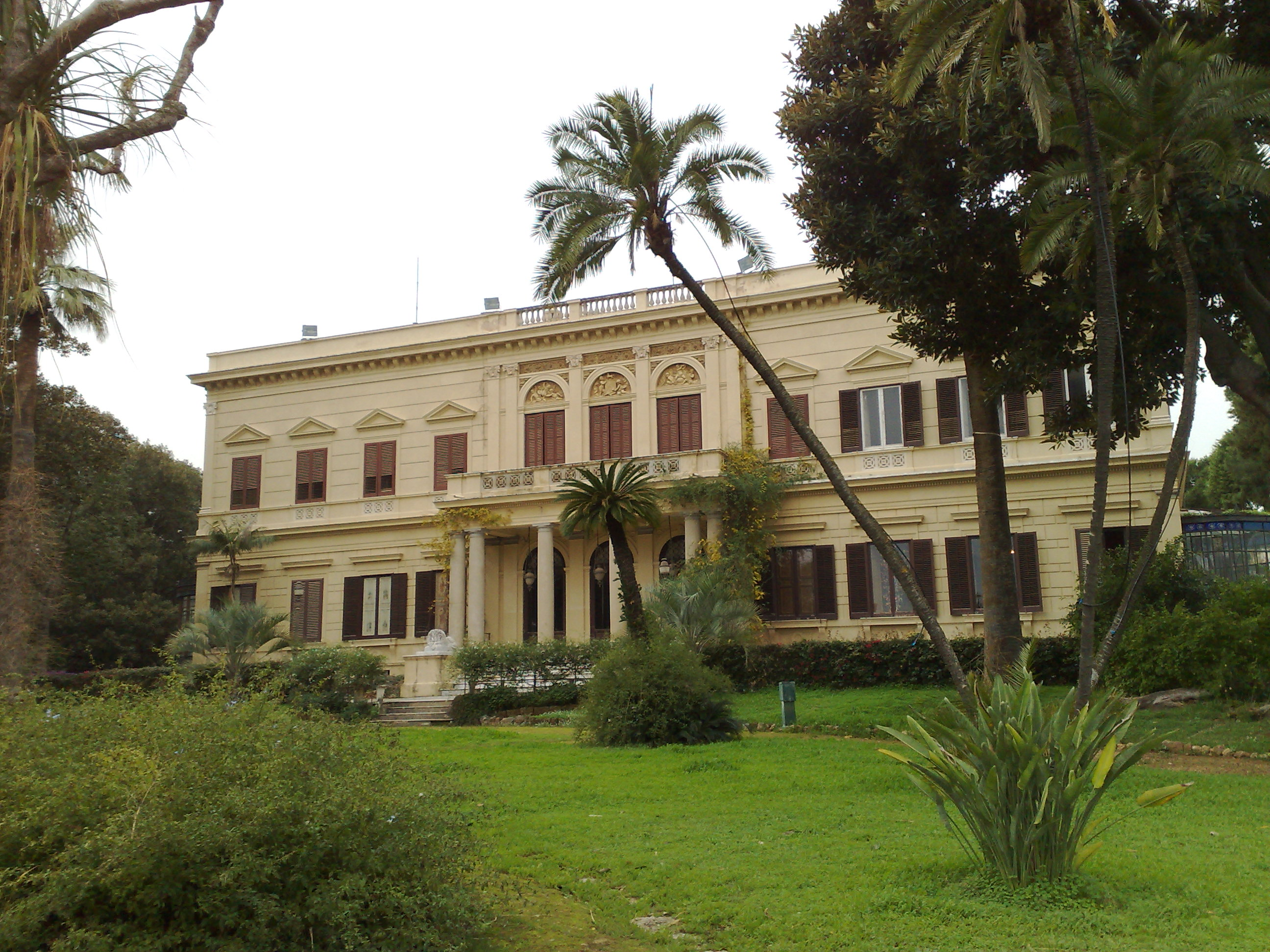
- Villa Malfitano Whitaker, façade
- Interactive map of the Villa Malfitano Whitaker area

General information
- Status: Headquarters of the Whitaker Foundation
- Type: Villa
- Architectural style: Neo-Renaissance and Eclecticism
- Location: Palermo, Sicily, Italy, Via Dante, 167
- Construction started: 1886
- Completed: 1889
- Client: Joseph Whitaker

Technical details
- Floor count: 3

Design and construction
- Architect: Ignazio Greco

Villa Malfitano Whitaker is a 19th-century villa in Via Dante, in the quarter of Politeama of Palermo, Sicily. It is presently a museum displaying Whitaker's natural history and archaeological collections, as well as his artwork.

== History ==
The villa was built between 1886 and 1889 for the Anglo-Italian businessman Joseph Whitaker and his wife Tina Whitaker. It was designed by the architect Ignazio Greco and represents a synthesis of Neo-Renaissance and Eclecticism styles. The state rooms were frescoed with a rich floral trompe-l’oeil decoration by Ettore De Maria Bergler. Other smaller rooms have Flemish tapestries with scenes from the Aeneid and frescoes by Rocco Lentini and stuccoes by Salvatore Valenti.

The garden of the villa was designed by Emilio Kunzmann and covers about seven hectares. Many rare plants from Tunisia, Sumatra, Australia and South America are located in it.

During the Belle Époque age the villa was the venue for lavish parties. The Whitaker family knew artists like Richard Wagner and the imperial dynasties of Great Britain, Germany and Russia.

The villa is currently the headquarters of the Whitaker Foundation.
