= George Wilmot Bonner =

British wood-engraver (1796–1836)

George Wilmot Bonner (24 May 1796 – 3 June 1836) was a British wood-engraver.

== Life ==
Bonner was born at Devizes and educated at Bath, he was apprenticed to Allen Robert Branston and then James Henry Vizetelly, wood-engravers in London. He became an engraver in the style of Thomas Bewick, and was noted for producing a gradation of tints by means of a combination of blocks.

Bonner himself trained William James Linton and William Henry Powis. He died on 3 June 1836.

== Works ==
With John Byfield, Bonner engraved for The Dance of Death, edited by Francis Douce in 1833, Hans Holbein's Imagines Mortis, from the Lyon edition of 1547. Some of his prints appeared in the British Cyclopædia.

== Notes ==
Attribution

This article incorporates text from a publication now in the public domain: Stephen, Leslie, ed. (1886). "Bonnar, George William". Dictionary of National Biography. Vol. 5. London: Smith, Elder & Co.
