= William Henry Powis =

William Henry Powis (1808–1836) was a British wood engraver. He was regarded as one of the best in the profession in his day. His early death at age 28, according to William James Linton, was caused by consumption.

== Life ==
Powis was born in London, and trained by George Wilmot Bonner. He then worked for John Jackson, who may have published some of Powis's wood-engravings as his own.

== Works ==
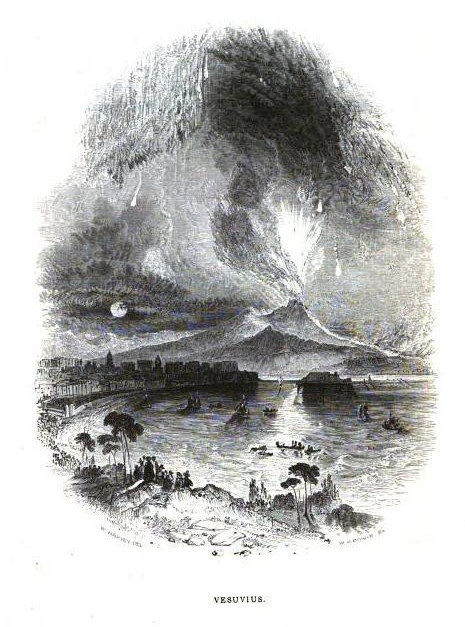
Mount Vesuvius, wood engraving by William Henry Powis after William Harvey, for The Solace of Song (1837) by Charles Latrobe

Powis's wood-engravings appeared as illustrations in:

- Francis Douce, The Dance of Death (1833), after Hans Holbein (with Bonner);
- James Northcote, Fables;
- Edward Turner Bennett, The Gardens and Menageries of the Zoological Society Delineated (1830–31);
- John Martin and Richard Westall's Pictorial Illustrations of the Bible, (1833);
- Thomas Scott's Bible, edition of 1834.

== Notes ==
Attribution

This article incorporates text from a publication now in the public domain: Lee, Sidney, ed. (1896). "Powis, William Henry". Dictionary of National Biography. Vol. 46. London: Smith, Elder & Co.
