= Vanchinbalyn Gularans =

Mongolian poet

Borjigin Vanchinbalyn Gularans (Mongolian: Ванчинбалын Гуларанс; c. 1820–1851) was a Mongolian poet, and the elder brother of the poet, novelist and translator Vanchinbalyn Injinash.
