= Eliza Lynn Linton =

English novelist and journalist (1822–1898)

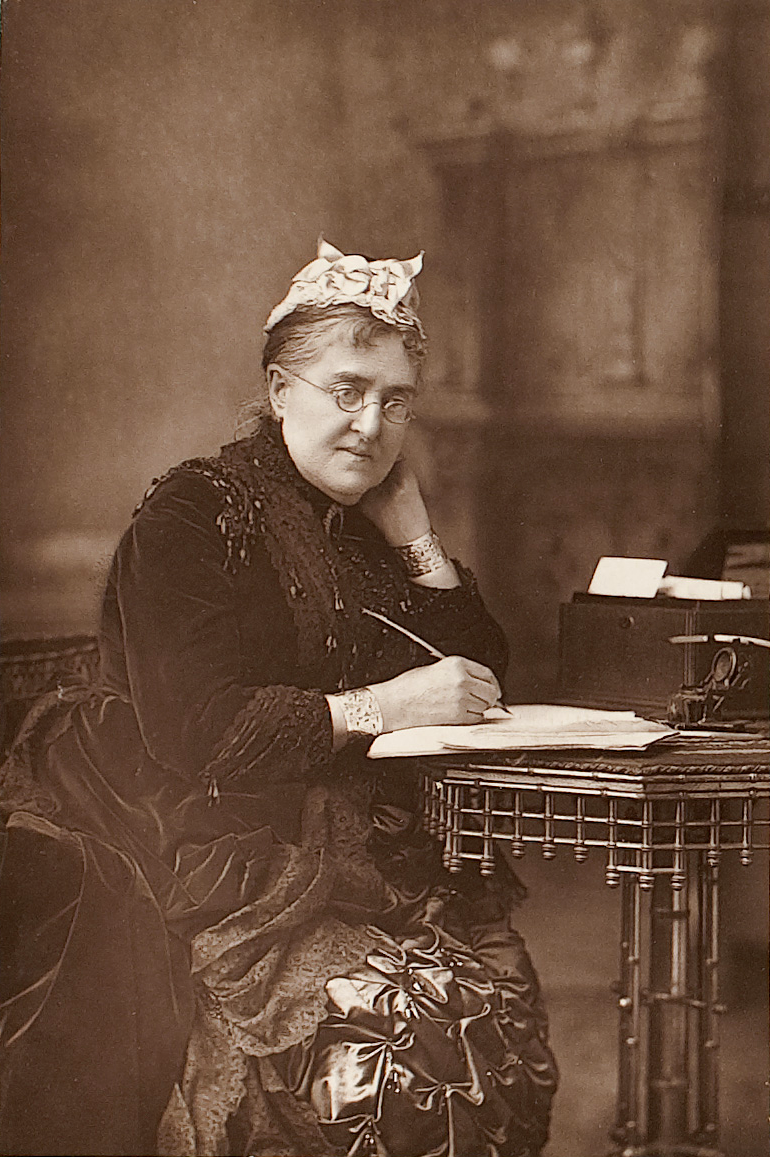
- Portrait of Eliza Lynn Linton, by W. & D. Downey, 1890
- Born: Eliza Lynn; 10 February 1822; Keswick, Cumbria, England
- Died: 14 July 1898 (aged 76); Westminster, London
- Occupation: Novelist
- Spouse: William James Linton
- Relatives: James Lynn (father), Charlotte Alicia Lynn (mother)
- Writing career
- Period: Victorian

Eliza Lynn Linton (10 February 1822 – 14 July 1898) was the first female salaried journalist in Britain and the author of over 20 novels. Despite her path-breaking role as an independent woman, many of her essays took a strong anti-feminist slant.

== Life ==
Linton was born in Keswick, Cumbria, England, the youngest of the twelve children of the Rev. James Lynn, vicar of Crosthwaite, and his wife Charlotte, who was the daughter of a bishop of Carlisle. The death of her mother when Eliza was five months old meant a chaotic upbringing, in which she was largely self-educated, but in 1845 she left home to earn her living as a writer in London.

After moving to Paris, she married W. J. Linton in 1858, an eminent wood-engraver, who was also a poet of note, a writer on his craft, and a Chartist agitator. She moved into his ramshackle house, Brantwood, in the Lake District, with his seven children from an earlier marriage, and wrote there a novel set locally: Lizzie Lorton of Greyrigg. The couple also lived at Gang Moor on the edge of Hampstead Heath for several years. In 1867 they separated amicably, her husband going to America and Eliza going back to life as a London writer.

Linton returned briefly to her childhood home in Cumbria in 1889, to feel "half in a dream here. It is Keswick and yet not Keswick, as I am Eliza Lynn and yet not Eliza Lynn." She usually lived in London until about three years before her death, when she retired to Brougham House, Malvern. She died at Queen Anne's Mansions, London, on 14 July 1898. Her ashes were scattered in Crosthwaite churchyard.

== Career ==
Linton arrived in London in 1845 as a protégée of the novelist William Harrison Ainsworth and the poet Walter Savage Landor. At one time she was promoted by Theodosia Monson, who was a champion of women's rights. In 1846 she produced her first novel, Azeth, the Egyptian, which was followed by Amymone (1848) and Realities (1851). Neither had great success. Meanwhile she began working as a journalist and became acquainted with George Eliot. Linton joined the staff of the Morning Chronicle in 1849, a position said to have made her the first woman to be paid a salary as a journalist. She left the paper in 1851 over a disagreement.

During her time in Paris, Linton was a correspondent for The Leader, which her husband had helped found. She was a regular contributor to Charles Dickens's Household Words and to St James's Gazette, the Daily News, Ainsworth's Magazine, The Cornhill Magazine and other leading newspapers. The prolific Linton became one of the best-known women periodical contributors of her time. Her 1864 guide to The Lake Country still bears reading for tart comments on the tourist rituals of the Victorians.

In 1881 and 1883 she travelled to Palermo, where she met Tina Whitaker and encouraged her to write.

After separating from her husband, Linton returned to writing novels, in which she finally attained wide popularity. Her most successful works were The True History of Joshua Davidson (1872), Patricia Kemball (1874), and The Autobiography of Christopher Kirkland (1885), the latter being in fact a thinly disguised autobiography. In 1896, she became one of the first women to be elected to the Society of Authors and was the first woman to serve on the society's committee.

== Views ==
Linton was a severe critic of early feminism. Her prominent essay on the subject, "The Girl of the Period," appeared in the Saturday Review in 1868 as a vehement attack. In 1891, she wrote "Wild Women as Politicians", explaining her view that politics were naturally the sphere of men, as was fame of any sort. "Amongst our most renowned women," she wrote, "are some who say with their whole heart, I would rather have been the wife of a great man, or the mother of a hero, than what I am, famous in my own person." Linton exemplifies how the fight against votes for women was not organised only by men (see Anti-suffragism).

Her obituary in The Times noted her "animosity towards all, or rather, some of those facets which may be conveniently called the 'New Woman'," but added that "it would perhaps be difficult to reduce Mrs. Lynn Linton's views on what was and what was not desirable for her own sex to a logical and connected form." Revisionist critics have noted an unconscious sympathy for the dashing "modern women" in her fiction, and to her support for the right of married women to own property and so gain greater independence. (See Married Women's Property Act 1870 and Married Women's Property Act 1882.)

Linton's contribution to a symposium on English fiction in 1890 took a less aggressive stance towards Grundyism than her fellow-contributor Thomas Hardy.

== Works ==
- Azeth, The Egyptian, T.C. Newby, 1847
- Amymone: A Romance in the Days of Pericles, Vol. 2, Vol. 3, Richard Bentley, 1848
- Realities: A Tale, Saunders and Otley, 1851
- Witch Stories, Chapman & Hall, 1861
- The Lake Country, Smith, Elder and Company, 1864
- Grasp Your Nettle, Vol. 2, Vol. 3, Smith, Elder & Co., 1865
- Lizzie Lorton of Greyrigg: A Novel, Harper & Brothers, 1866
- Sowing the Wind, Vol. 2, Vol. 3, Tinsley Brothers 1867
- "Clementina Kinniside," The Galaxy 5, January/July 1868
- The True History of Joshua Davidson, Christian and Communist, J. B. Lippincott, 1873 [1st publication, Strahan & Company, 1872]
- Patricia Kemball, J. B. Lippincott & Co., 1875
- The Mad Willoughbys and other Tales, 1875
- The Atonement of Leam Dundas, J. B. Lippincott & Co., 1876
- From Dreams to Waking, Harper & Bros, 1877
- The World Well Lost, Vol. 2, Chatto & Windus, 1877
- Under which Lord?, Vol. 2, Vol. 3, Chatto & Windus, 1879
- "At Night in a Hospital," Belgravia, July 1879
- The Rebel of the Family, Vol. 2, Chatto & Windus, 1880
- With a Silken Thread and other Stories, Chatto & Windus, 1880
- "My Love!", Chatto & Windus, 1881
- Ione, Chatto and Windus, 1883
- The Girl of the Period and Other Social Essays, Vol. 2, Richard Bentley & Son, 1883
- Ourselves: Essays on Women, Chatto & Windus, 1884
- The Autobiography of Christopher Kirkland, Vol. 2, Vol. 3, R. Bentley, 1885
- Stabbed in the Dark, F. V. White & Co., 1885
- "A Protest and a Plea," The Order of Creation: The Conflict Between Genesis and Geology, The Truth Seeker Company, 1885
- Rift in the Lute, Simpkin, 1885
- Paston Carew, Millionaire and Miser: A Novel, Bentley, 1886
- Through the Long Night, Hurst & Blackett Limited, 1889
- About Ireland, Methuen & Co., 1890
- An Octave of Friends, with other Silhouettes and Stories, Ward & Downey, 1891
- About Ulster, Methuen & Co., 1892
- The One too Many, F. Tennyson Neely, 1894
- In Haste and at Leisure, Merriam Co., 1895
- Dulcie Everton, Vol. 2, Chatto & Windus, 1896
- 'Twixt Cup & Lip. Etc, Digby, Long & Co., 1896
- My Literary Life, Hodder and Stroughton, 1899
- The Second Youth of Theodora Desanges, Hutchinson & Co., 1900
- The Fate of Madame Cabanel, n.d.
- The Witches of Scotland, n.d.

=== Selected articles ===
- "The Modern Revolt," Macmillan's Magazine, December 1870
- An Old English Home, The Atlantic Monthly, 32, July 1873
- "Some Sicilian Customs," The Eclectic Magazine 41, New Series, 1885
- "A Protest and a Plea," The Gentleman's Magazine 260, 1886
- "The Future Supremacy of Women," The National Review, Vol. VIII, 1886
- "The Higher Education of Women", Popular Science Monthly 30, December 1886
- "Womanhood in Old Greece," The Library Magazine 2, Third Series, November 1886/March 1887
- "The Tyranny of Fashion," The Forum 3, March 1887
- “The Roman Matron,” The Library Magazine 4, Third Series, July/September 1887
- “The Pains of Fear,” The Forum 5, May 1888
- “Are Good Women Characterless?,” The Forum 6, February 1889
- “Democracy in the Household,” The Forum 8, September 1889
- "Our Illusions," Fortnightly Review 49, pp. 596–7, 1891
- "The Revolt Against Matrimony," The Forum 10 (5), January 1891
- "The Judicial Shock to Marriage," Nineteenth Century 29, May 1891
- "The Wild Women: as Politicians," Nineteenth Century, July 1891
- "The Wild Women As Social Insurgents," The Nineteenth Century 30, pp. 596–605, October 1891
- "The Partisans of the Wild Women," Nineteenth Century 31, pp. 455–464, April 1892
- "The New Woman," St. James's Budget, July 1894
- "The Rex Nemorum," St. James's Budget, August 1894
- "The Philistine's Coming Triumph," National Review 26, September 1895
- "Cranks and Crazes," The North American Review, December 1895
- "George Eliot." In Women Novelists of Queen Victoria's Reign, Hurst & Blackett, Limited, 1897

== See also ==
- Ada Ellen Bayly
- John Ruskin
- Walter Besant
