= Hovhannes Hisarian =

Ottoman Armenian writer, novelist, archeologist, editor, and educator

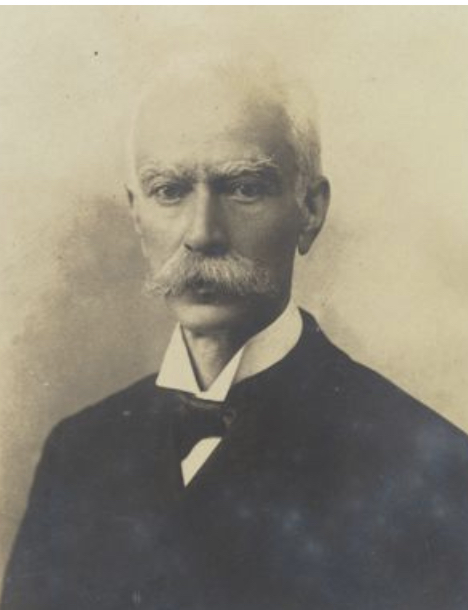
- Born: 1827; Constantinople, Ottoman Empire (now Istanbul, Turkey)
- Died: 1916 (aged 88–89); Constantinople (Istanbul)
- Occupations: Author, archeologist, educator.

Hovhannes Hisarian (Armenian: Հովհաննես Հիսարյան, Turkish: Ovannes Hisaryan; born 1827 in Constantinople, Ottoman Empire – died 1916 in Constantinople, Ottoman Empire) was an Ottoman Armenian writer, novelist, archeologist, editor, and educator. He was considered the first Armenian romantic novelist.

== Writing career ==
Hovhannes Hisarian is considered the first Armenian romantic novelist in the vernacular Ashkharhabar dialect because of his novel Khosrov yev Makruhi (Khosrov and Makruhi, 1851).

His second novel, Nern Kam Kataratz Ashkhari (The Antichrist, or the end of the world, 1867) was also written in the same style as Khosrov Yev Makruhi, however the plot and storyline was about religious and metaphysical sentiment.

Even though he tends to write in the Ashkharhabar vernacular, he has published some of his poetry in the Classical Armenian (Krapar) dialect as well. These poems are collected in a volume called Tivan Vor E Dagharan (The Divan Which is Poetry, 1909).

Due to his interest in archeology, he has written many essay and articles pertaining to archeology and the study of it.
