= Henri Eduard Beunke =

Dutch writer

Ir. Henri Eduard Beunke (Middelburg, 14 September 1851 – Amersfoort, 11 February 1925) was a Dutch writer, known for his literary regionalistic work set in his home province of Zeeland.

Born and raised in the provincial capital city of Middelburg, he spent his childhood summers in Domburg due to his fragile health. While there, he grew familiar with the local culture and dialect that would later form the primary inspiration for his work, most of which is set on Walcheren and written in Zeelandic. Though writing was never his sole profession–he studied at Delft University of Technology and became an engineer–he produced over fifteen short stories and novellas over a period of thirteen years, before abruptly giving up writing at the age of 35.

== Works ==
- Jannetje, een Zeeuwse novelle (1873) (signed Henri)
- De Erfenis, een Zeeuwse novelle (1874) (signed Henri)
- Een Vertelling (1875) (signed Henri)
- Walchersche Schetsen and Vertellingen (De Roos van Duunland, Vertelsels van Louw, Wullem de Postriejer en z'n zeuntje, Teikeniengetjes mit de Penne) (1875) (signed Heins)
- Uit het Walchersche Boerenleven, een tweetal schetsen (Simon, Baas Jan) (1877) (signed Heins)
- Several novellas featured in Nutsalmanak (1879), De Gids (1879), Eigen Haard (1879) and Tijdspiegel (1880, 1882, 1883)
- Walchersche novellen (1883) (signed H.E. Beunke)
