= Realities (novel) =

1851 novel

- Author: Eliza Lynn Linton
- Language: English
- Genre: Social novel
- Publisher: Saunders and Otley
- Publication date: 1851
- Publication place: United Kingdom
- Media type: Print

Realities is an 1851 novel by the British writer Eliza Lynn Linton. A social novel with elements of melodrama, Linton drew on her own experiences of London for the novel. The publisher Edward Chapman rejected the book, describing it as "sordid", and was sued by Linton. It was eventually published by another London based company Saunders and Otley. It was her third novel, the previous two having been historical novels, and received a very hostile critical reception. She was associated with conservative feminism and was an associate of Charles Dickens. The harsh response to the novel led her to drop into anonymous work for periodicals for several years, and it was until 1861 that she published another work under her own name.

== Bibliography ==
- Carroll, Rachel & Tolan, Fiona (ed.) The Routledge Companion to Literature and Feminism. Taylor & Francis, 2023.
- Hartley, Lucy (ed.) The History of British Women's Writing, 1830-1880. Palgrave Macmillan, 2018.
- Smith, Francis Barrymore. Radical Artisan, William James Linton, 1812-97. Manchester University Press, 1973.
- Sutherland, John. The Stanford Companion to Victorian Fiction. Stanford University Press, 1990.
