= Raleigh Trevelyan =

Walter Raleigh Trevelyan FRSL (6 July 1923 – 23 October 2014) was a British author, editor, and publisher and a Fellow of the Royal Society of Literature.

== Childhood ==
Raleigh Trevelyan was born in the Andaman Islands, India, to Colonel Walter Raleigh Fetherstonhaugh Trevelyan, commander of the British Indian Army garrison at the penal settlement of Port Blair, and Olive Beatrice Frost Trevelyan. The family moved to Punjab, and then when he was six, the family trekked on horseback for three weeks to his father's new assignment in Gilgit, where Colonel Trevelyan was posted as military adviser to the Maharaja of Jammu and Kashmir. At the age of eight, like many children of the British Raj, Raleigh was packed off to a boarding prep school in England and rarely saw his parents after that.

== Professional life and works ==
After leaving Winchester College in 1942, Trevelyan served in the Second World War in the Rifle Brigade and was sent first to Algiers and then to Italy. On 23 May 1944, during the breakout from Anzio, the Green Howards battalion to which he was attached lost 230 men, some of whose deaths he blamed on himself. Towards the end of 1944, back with the Rifle Brigade, Trevelyan got a job in the British military mission in Rome, where he remained for two years, falling in love with central Italy. His participation in the bloody Battle of Anzio, in which he was wounded twice, was the subject of two memoirs. The Fortress: A Diary of Anzio and After (1957), was recognized for his painfully honest account of how a soldier responds to the terror of being under fire. Later, with the help of German and Italian friends, Trevelyan wrote Rome '44: The Battle for the Eternal City (1981), which provided a vivid account of what it had been like for soldiers and civilians on the other side of the conflict.

After the war Trevelyan worked briefly in merchant banking, then became an editor at William Collins, Sons and later at Jonathan Cape and Michael Joseph, editing both fiction and nonfiction while writing his own books. Some of Trevelyan's early popular books were about Italy. Princes Under the Volcano: Two Hundred Years of a British Dynasty in Sicily (1973), an account of the British role on that island, particularly the Whitaker family, who started out exporting Marsala wine and ended up entertaining European royalty. The Shadow of Vesuvius (1976) is about the discovery of the remains of Pompeii and Herculaneum in the 18th century. A 1978 book, A Pre-Raphaelite Circle, viewed the major painters of the early Victorian avant-garde movement of the title through the prism of correspondence he found in the papers of Pauline Trevelyan, a distant relation by marriage who was a confidante and patron of the art critic and artist John Ruskin.

The Golden Oriole (1987) combined a journal of Trevelyan's five journeys to the subcontinent with historical chronicle, genealogy, family photographs, memoirs and interviews, to trace his family's involvement across 200 years of British involvement in India. Notable were Sir William Macnaghten, the British Resident in Kabul whose beheading during the First Anglo-Afghan War prompted the 1842 retreat from Kabul and the Massacre of Elphinstone's Army and the ten Trevelyans who were among the hundreds of Britons massacred during the Siege of Cawnpore in the Indian Rebellion of 1857. Others ancestors discussed in the chronicle include Thomas Babington Macaulay who introduced English-medium education in India; Charles Trevelyan, reformer of the British Civil Service and later Governor of Madras and Indian Finance Minister; George Otto Trevelyan, the author of the classic, The Competition Wallah (1865); Humphrey Trevelyan, a British diplomat who became one of Jawaharlal Nehru's closest and most valued associates during the final preparations for Indian Independence; and, of course, his own parents.

Trevelyan spent ten years retracing Walter Raleigh's footsteps for his best-known work, the acclaimed biography Sir Walter Raleigh (2002). The volume argued for the elevation of his distant ancestor and namesake to the upper reaches of the pantheon of British greats, based on Raleigh's achievements as an explorer, courtier, poet, American colonizer and early purveyor of tobacco to England and potatoes to Ireland. The book waded deep into the nuances of British, French and Spanish foreign policy to explain Raleigh's various acts of naval heroism and piracy; verified Raleigh's claims about silver and gold deposits in The Guianas (thought at the time to be wild fabrications); and brought Elizabethan court intrigues into focus to trace the events that led to Raleigh's years in the Tower of London and his beheading for treason in 1618.

== Personal life ==
He resided at both Shepherd Market in Mayfair, London, and in Cornwall. His Spanish partner Raúl Balín died in 2004.

== Publications ==
- The Fortress: A Diary of Anzio and After, 1956
- A Hermit Disclosed, 1960, ISBN 978-0571269006
- The Big Tomato, 1966
- Princes Under the Volcano: Two Hundred Years of a British Dynasty in Sicily, 1972
- The Shadow of Vesuvius, 1976, ISBN 978-0718115579
- A Pre-Raphaelite Circle, 1978, ISBN 978-0847660254
- Rome '44: The Battle for the Eternal City, 1981, ISBN 978-0436534003
- Shades of the Alhambra, 1984
- The Golden Oriole: Childhood, Family and Friends in India, 1987, ISBN 0-436-53403-7
- Grand Dukes and Diamonds: The Wernhers of Luton Hoo, 1991, ISBN 978-0571290291
- Wallington, Northumberland (National Trust Guidebooks), 1994, ISBN 978-0707802305
- The Companion Guide to Sicily, 1999, ISBN 978-1900639163
- Sir Walter Raleigh, 2002, ISBN 978-0713993264
- Parliamentary and legal questions, 1832, 2010, ISBN 978-1240046973
- Elegy on the Death of the Princess Charlotte with Lines on the Death of J. Tweddell, 2011, ISBN 978-1241013103
